= El Señor de los Cielos season 9 =

El Señor de los Cielos
- Season 9
- Starring: Rafael Amaya; Itatí Cantoral; Robinson Díaz; Carmen Aub; Iván Arana; África Zavala; Isabella Castillo; Julio Bracho; Jason Romo
- No. of episodes: 94

Release
- Original network: Telemundo
- Original release: 13 February – 26 June 2024

Season chronology
- ← Previous; Season 8

The ninth season of the American television series El Señor de los Cielos was announced on 11 May 2023. The season is directed by Danny Gavidia, Mauricio Corredor, Mauricio Meneses and Bernardo Mota, with Karen Barroeta, Ximena Cantuarias, and Monica Vizzi serving as executive producers.

Rafael Amaya, Carmen Aub, Iván Arana, África Zavala and Isabella Castillo are set to return to the main cast, with Itati Cantoral and Arturo Peniche as newcomers.

The season premiered on 13 February 2024 and concluded on 26 June 2024.

== Cast ==
=== Main ===
- Rafael Amaya as Aurelio Casillas
- Itatí Cantoral as Belén San Román / Blanca Lovato
- Robinson Díaz as Miltón Jiménez "El Cabo"
- Carmen Aub as Rutila Casillas
- Iván Arana as Ismael Casillas
- África Zavala as Mecha de la Cruz
- Isabella Castillo as Diana Ahumada
- Julio Bracho as Ricardo Almenar
- Jason Romo as Diego Bustamante

=== Recurring ===
- Alan Slim as Jaime Ernesto Rosales
- Thali García as Berenice Ahumada
- Karen Sandoval as Laura Casillas
- Carla Carrillo as Amanda Almenar
- Denia Agalianou as Dalila Zuc
- Carlos Corona as Rigoberto Alfaro
- Daniel Martínez as Guillermo Colón
- José Sedek as Bernardo Castillo
- Wendy de los Cobos as Aguasanta "Tata" Guerra
- Elsy Reyes as Carla Uzcátegui
- Aleida Núñez as Nina "La Monarca"
- Michel Chauvet as Reynaldo San Román
- Iván Amozurrutia as Dr. Rafael Lazcano
- Cristian Gamero as Lencho Cabañas
- Martijn Kuiper as Lucas Manzano
- Mimi Morales as Said
- Maricela González as Eunice Lara "La Felina"
- Daniel Martínez Campos as Arístides Istúriz
- Leonardo Álvarez as Leonardo Castaño
- Carlos Balderrama as José Manuel Castillo "Manny"
- Fernando Banda as El Vitaminas
- Gabriel Bonilla as Isidro Casillas
- Emilio Chabre as Chemita Venegas
- Alejandro Félix as Chatarrero
- Fede Gallardo as Esteban
- Alejandro Navarrete as El Zopilote
- David Ponce as José Manrique "Skinny"
- Carlos Puente as Pompeyo
- Roberto Valdez as JP
- Alex Walerstein as Paul "El Greñas"

=== Guest stars ===
- Arturo Peniche as Flavio San Román
- Francisco Angelini as Rocco San Román
- Julia Gama as La Melosa

== Episodes ==
No. overall	No. in season	Title	Original release date	US viewers (millions)
702	1	"La Bestia despierta"	13 February 2024	1.29
703	2	"Aquí mando yo"	14 February 2024	1.04
704	3	"Eterno enemigo"	15 February 2024	1.05
705	4	"Ilusiones perdidas"	16 February 2024	1.07
706	5	"Geografía de una traición"	19 February 2024	1.14
707	6	"Padre no entierra hijos"	20 February 2024	1.02
708	7	"La ambición tiene cara de mujer"	21 February 2024	1.02
709	8	"Palabra de hombre"	22 February 2024	1.12
710	9	"Señor de los infiernos"	23 February 2024	1.03
711	10	"Después de una tempestad viene otra"	26 February 2024	1.12
712	11	"La guerra cambia de país"	27 February 2024	1.14
713	12	"Un mundo nuevo"	28 February 2024	1.10
714	13	"Alba Marina"	29 February 2024	1.04
715	14	"De alianzas y venganzas"	1 March 2024	1.14
716	15	"Una dulce enemiga"	4 March 2024	1.16
717	16	"El último latido"	5 March 2024	1.03
718	17	"El cuarto poder"	6 March 2024	0.96
719	18	"Aguas turbulentas"	8 March 2024	0.92
720	19	"Fuego por los cuatro costados"	11 March 2024	1.16
721	20	"Un secreto desesperado"	12 March 2024	1.06
722	21	"Ismael vuela alto"	13 March 2024	1.03
723	22	"Persecución implacable"	14 March 2024	1.14
724	23	"Unas de cal, otras de arena"	15 March 2024	1.05
725	24	"Por nuestros muertos"	18 March 2024	1.14
726	25	"El sacrificio"	19 March 2024	1.13
727	26	"Sangre con sangre se paga"	20 March 2024	1.07
728	27	"Desaparecida"	21 March 2024	1.05
729	28	"Caída y mesa limpia"	22 March 2024	0.99
730	29	"A la caza de La Felina"	25 March 2024	1.01
731	30	"Órdenes son órdenes"	26 March 2024	0.91
732	31	"Manzano busca salvar su pellejo"	27 March 2024	0.98
733	32	"Jugada por un presidenciable"	28 March 2024	1.09
734	33	"El segundo Milagrito"	29 March 2024	1.00
735	34	"Una alianza entre enemigos"	1 April 2024	0.92
736	35	"Huele raro"	2 April 2024	0.87
737	36	"Todo por Mecha"	3 April 2024	0.91
738	37	"La obsesión de Said"	4 April 2024	0.97
739	38	"Poderosas estrategias"	5 April 2024	0.85
740	39	"Con Dios y con el diablo"	8 April 2024	0.97
741	40	"Al descubierto"	9 April 2024	0.97
742	41	"Una propuesta inesperada"	10 April 2024	1.00
743	42	"Comparten el mismo hombre"	11 April 2024	1.06
744	43	"Said pierde la cabeza"	12 April 2024	0.98
745	44	"Al borde del suicidio"	15 April 2024	1.05
746	45	"Belén traza una línea"	16 April 2024	1.07
747	46	"Llegó tu hora"	17 April 2024	1.08
748	47	"Entre la vida y la muerte"	18 April 2024	1.04
749	48	"Este demonio es tu padre"	19 April 2024	1.06
750	49	"Un amor prohibido"	22 April 2024	1.06
751	50	"El beso más amargo"	23 April 2024	1.03
752	51	"Presa de sus acciones"	24 April 2024	1.02
753	52	"Belén se lleva la peor parte"	25 April 2024	1.12
754	53	"Cobardía y sacrificios"	26 April 2024	0.92
755	54	"Almenar negocia por su hija"	29 April 2024	1.02
756	55	"Con el Diablo no se juega"	30 April 2024	0.90
757	56	"La suerte está echada"	1 May 2024	1.04
758	57	"Moneda de cambio"	2 May 2024	1.04
759	58	"El cuarto poder se desinfla"	3 May 2024	1.01
760	59	"Ojos en todos lados"	6 May 2024	1.13
761	60	"La primera dama"	7 May 2024	1.04
762	61	"Música para sus oídos"	8 May 2024	0.93
763	62	"Hijo o rival"	9 May 2024	1.07
764	63	"El matasanos"	10 May 2024	1.00
765	64	"A cortar la culebra por la cabeza"	13 May 2024	1.16
766	65	"Códigos no escritos"	14 May 2024	1.08
767	66	"Golpe mediático"	16 May 2024	1.20
768	67	"Que tenga suerte, presidente"	17 May 2024	1.10
769	68	"Mecanismos de defensa"	20 May 2024	1.05
770	69	"La verdad, aunque duela"	21 May 2024	0.92
771	70	"La guerrera independiente"	22 May 2024	0.90
772	71	"La Felina enjaulada"	23 May 2024	0.84
773	72	"Un revés incalculable"	24 May 2024	0.90
774	73	"Olor a traición"	27 May 2024	0.88
775	74	"El arte de la intuición"	28 May 2024	1.04
776	75	"Cambio de imagen"	29 May 2024	0.87
777	76	"Callas o mueres"	30 May 2024	0.81
778	77	"Grietas profundas"	31 May 2024	0.76
779	78	"Desmanes de un trío"	3 June 2024	N/A
780	79	"Codo a codo conmigo"	4 June 2024	N/A
781	80	"Mecha mete la nariz en el negocio"	5 June 2024	N/A
782	81	"Secreto de Estado"	6 June 2024	N/A
783	82	"Cierre de cuentas"	7 June 2024	N/A
784	83	"En alerta"	10 June 2024	N/A
785	84	"Paradojas de la vida"	11 June 2024	N/A
786	85	"Sendero de venganza"	13 June 2024	N/A
787	86	"Entre la sangre y la traición"	14 June 2024	N/A
788	87	"Giros del destino"	17 June 2024	N/A
789	88	"Un asunto de negocios"	18 June 2024	N/A
790	89	"Al acecho"	19 June 2024	N/A
791	90	"Golpe inminente"	20 June 2024	N/A
792	91	"El arma secreta de Belén"	21 June 2024	N/A
793	92	"Mortíferas consecuencias"	24 June 2024	N/A
794	93	"Cortina de humo"	25 June 2024	N/A
795 796	94	"Duelo de reyes"	26 June 2024	N/A

== Production ==
On 11 May 2023, Telemundo renewed the series for a ninth season. On 21 August 2023, it was announced that the cast had received the scripts of the first episodes. Filming of the season began in September 2023. On 12 October 2023, a list of new and returning cast members was announced. A two-minute promotional trailer was released on 12 December 2023. The official trailer was released on 11 January 2024. On 24 April 2024, Rafael Amaya announced that he would be departing Telemundo and the series after the ninth season. Weeks later, Telemundo announced that the franchise would continue in a spin-off sequel titled La dinastía Casillas, centering on Rutila and Ismael Casillas.
