= El Señor de los Cielos season 10 =

El Señor de los Cielos
- Season 10
- Starring: Rafael Amaya; Carmen Aub; Isabella Castillo; Roberto Sosa; Carlos Corona; Ximena Gónzalez Rubio; David Ponce
- No. of episodes: 90

Release
- Original network: Telemundo
- Original release: 7 July – 12 November 2026

Season chronology
- ← Previous; Season 9

The tenth and final season of the American television series El Señor de los Cielos was announced on 22 January 2026. The season is directed by Danny Gavidia, Mauricio Corredor, Laura Marco and Jorge Rios, with Rafael Amaya, Monica Vizzi, Jacky Castro, Juan Ponce and Monica Albuquerque serving as executive producers.

Rafael Amaya, Carmen Aub, and Isabella Castillo returned to the main cast, with Roberto Sosa and Ximena Gónzalez Rubio as newcomers.

The season premiered on 7 July 2026 and concluded on 12 November 2026.

== Cast ==
=== Main ===
- Rafael Amaya as Aurelio Casillas
- Carmen Aub as Rutila Casillas
- Isabella Castillo as Diana Ahumada
- Roberto Sosa as General Santiago Cifuentes
- Carlos Corona as Rigoberto Alfaro
- Ximena Gónzalez Rubio as Lucía Fernanda Estrada
- David Ponce as José Manrique "Skinny"

=== Recurring ===
- Estefanía Hinojosa as Consuelo Delgado
- Denia Agalianou as Dalila Zuc
- José Sedek as Bernardo Castillo
- Roberta Burns as Constanza Velázquez
- Leonardo Álvarez as Leonardo Castaño
- Daniel Martínez Campos as Arístides Istúriz
- Fernando Banda as El Vitaminas
- Marco Tostado as David Hernández
- Julia Urbini as Romina
- Gabriel Nuncio as Antonio Gutiérrez
- Alejandro Navarrete as El Zopilote
- Nicolás Haza as Isidro Casillas
- Aleida Núñez as Nina "La Monarca"
- Roberto Valdez as JP
- Pakey Vázquez as Hache
- Alejandro Félix as Chatarrero
- José Dammert as Mauricio Sandoval
- Alan Ciangherotti as El Loco
- Maricela González as Eunice Lara "La Felina"

=== Guest stars ===
- Robinson Díaz as Miltón Jiménez "El Cabo"
- Elsy Reyes as Carla Uzcátegui
- Plutarco Haza as Dalvio Navarrete "El Ingeniero"
- Wendy de los Cobos as Aguasanta "Tata" Guerra
- Michel Chauvet as Reynaldo San Román
- Carla Carrillo as Amanda Almenar
- Sandra Echeverría as Prosecutor María José Huertas

== Episodes ==
No. overall	No. in season	Title	Original release date
797	1	"Operación Michoacán"	7 July 2026
798	2	"Vida y muerte"	8 July 2026
799	3	"La culpa"	9 July 2026
800	4	"Notorius"	10 July 2026
801	5	"Desconfianza"	13 July 2026
802	6	"El target: Cifuentes"	14 July 2026
803	7	"Punto de quiebre"	15 July 2026
804	8	"Entre aliados y enemigos"	16 July 2026
805	9	"Cada victoria tiene un precio"	17 July 2026
806	10	"Choque entre mujeres"	20 July 2026
807	11	"La sangre no miente"	21 July 2026
808	12	"El rastro enemigo"	22 July 2026
809	13	"El reino de las esmeraldas"	23 July 2026
810	14	"Plan de inversión"	24 July 2026
811	15	"La revelación de Aurelio"	27 July 2026
812	16	"Nuevo rastro"	28 July 2026
813	17	"El enemigo está cerca"	29 July 2026
814	18	"Golpe al narco"	30 July 2026
815	19	"Batalla por la venganza"	31 July 2026
816	20	"La crisis los divide"	3 August 2026
817	21	"Las últimas palabras"	4 August 2026
818	22	"El deseo de Aurelio"	5 August 2026
819	23	"Pasión desbordada"	6 August 2026
820	24	"El poder de las alianzas"	7 August 2026
821	25	"Celos y sospechas"	10 August 2026
822	26	"Una jugada maestra"	11 August 2026
823	27	"Una vieja deuda"	12 August 2026
824	28	"Territorio en guerra"	13 August 2026
825	29	"Ajuste de cuentas"	14 August 2026
826	30	"La conquista del banco"	17 August 2026
827	31	"Conexión y conspiración"	18 August 2026
828	32	"Isidro en el radar"	19 August 2026
829	33	"La amenaza llega con Castillo"	20 August 2026
830	34	"Señuelo"	21 August 2026
831	35	"Operación millonaria"	24 August 2026
832	36	"El manifiesto"	25 August 2026
833	37	"La trampa perfecta"	26 August 2026
834	38	"En la mira"	27 August 2026
835	39	"La estocada"	28 August 2026
836	40	"Entre mujeres y el poder"	31 August 2026
837	41	"Los fantasmas del pasado"	1 September 2026
838	42	"Hombre clave"	2 September 2026
839	43	"Tiempo de venganza"	3 September 2026
840	44	"El secreto de Lucy"	4 September 2026
841	45	"Ultimátum"	7 September 2026
842	46	"A un paso del peligro"	8 September 2026
843	47	"El expediente"	10 September 2026
844	48	"El tablero cambia"	11 September 2026
845	49	"Pulso por la frontera"	14 September 2026
846	50	"Todo o nada"	15 September 2026
847	51	"El juego comienza"	16 September 2026
848	52	"Dueños de Nueva York"	17 September 2026
849	53	"Bajo nuevas reglas"	18 September 2026
850	54	"La gran conquista"	21 September 2026
851	55	"Una decisión difícil"	22 September 2026
852	56	"Negocio sin frontera"	23 September 2026
853	57	"Mala jugada"	24 September 2026
854	58	"La encrucijada"	25 September 2026
855	59	"Desplante presidencial"	28 September 2026
856	60	"El imperio secreto"	29 September 2026
857	61	"A un paso de la muerte"	30 September 2026
858	62	"El control del banco"	1 October 2026
859	63	"El precio de negarse"	2 October 2026
860	64	"La seguridad del cielo"	5 October 2026
861	65	"Cacería implacable"	6 October 2026
862	66	"Sin escapatoria"	7 October 2026
863	67	"El precio de la traición"	8 October 2026
864	68	"A sangre fría"	9 October 2026
865	69	"¿Socios?"	12 October 2026
866	70	"En jaque"	13 October 2026
867	71	"Nada será igual"	14 October 2026
868	72	"Sín limites"	15 October 2026
869	73	"El aviso de Sakuani"	16 October 2026
870	74	"Un paso sin retorno"	19 October 2026
871	75	"Atrapada entre dos frentes"	20 October 2026
872	76	"La ley del poder"	21 October 2026
873	77	"La voluntad del rey"	23 October 2026
874	78	"Cuenta pendiente"	26 October 2026
875	79	"Recompensa millonaria"	27 October 2026
876	80	"Un rival inesperado"	28 October 2026
877	81	"Sin vuelta atrás"	29 October 2026
878	82	"La emboscada perfecta"	30 October 2026
879	83	"El negocio evoluciona"	2 November 2026
880	84	"Pacto, ambición y traición"	4 November 2026
881	85	"Alerta entre los Casillas"	5 November 2026
882	86	"Un invitado indeseado"	6 November 2026
883	87	"Operación Acción Rayo"	9 November 2026
884	88	"La caída se aproxima"	10 November 2026
885	89	"Estrategia"	11 November 2026
886 887	90	"El final de una leyenda"	12 November 2026

== Production ==
In April 2024, Rafael Amaya announced that he would be leaving the series at the end of the ninth season. In May 2025, a spinoff series titled Dinastía Casillas with Iván Arana set to reprise his role as Ismael Casillas was confirmed to be in development in place of a tenth season of El Señor de los Cielos. However, in January 2026, Telemundo renewed the series for a tenth season with Amaya confirmed to return to the series. Filming of the season began on 16 March 2026. On 18 May 2026, Telemundo announced that the series would end after the tenth season.
