= Lorena del Castillo =

Mexican actress and model

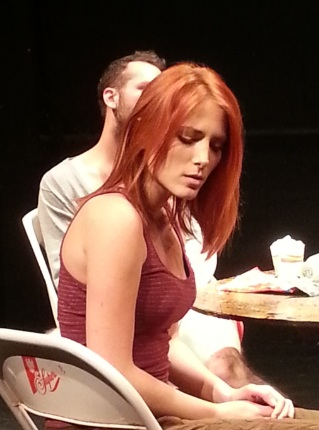
- Born: Lorena del Castillo Campoy; 14 July 1988 (age 38); Zapopan, Jalisco, Mexico
- Occupations: Actress; model
- Years active: 2007–present
- Height: 1.72 m (5 ft 8 in)

Lorena del Castillo Campoy (born July 14, 1988 in Zapopan, Jalisco, Mexico) is a Mexican actress and model.

== Biography ==
Lorena del Castillo before starting her career as an actress, she participated in the contest Nuestra Belleza Jalisco in the edition held in 2007 representing her hometown, Zapopan.

Lorena is a graduate of the Instituto de Ciencias de Guadalajara and the CEA de Televisa. Later she has encouraged her studies in various acting workshops, highlighting those of the teacher Fernando Piernas.

She studied a film course for the understanding of behind-the-scenes art and various scriptwriting courses.

Her career has been developed mainly in the theater. Her first professional work was for the UNAM in the play "La tempestad" headed by Ignacio López Tarso at Juan Ruiz de Alarcón and has participated in different theatrical montages. One of the most emblematic (for being the first time the CEA won the prize) was in the play "Palomita POP, apuntes sobre la inmadurez", winning work of the "Festival Internacional de teatro de UNAM."

In telenovelas has also participated, highlighting among them her role of Ileana Sodi in Amor bravío. And her greatest opportunity in El Señor de los Cielos as Evelyn Garcia.

Her work also extends to the cinema, has made approximately fifteen independent short films, acted in the film "Entre sombras" and the film "Desde el más alla" will be released commercially soon where she plays "Claudia".

== Filmography ==
=== Film ===
Year	Title	Role
2008	Romeo y Lorenza	Brigida
2012	La mala luz	Store Clerk
2014	Rosaura	Rosaura
2014	Erase una vez Emilia	Emilia
2015	La otra Maria	La Chiva
2015	Solitude	Lara
2015	Bajo la misma piel	Daniela
2017	Desde el más alla	Claudia
2017	The Wild Dance	Gaby
2017	Domingo 7	StarRole
2019	Criaturas Ajenas	Ana
2019	Un tipo Violento	Andrea
2019	Yo Fausto	Alexandra
TBD	Plan de vida 17	Anapola

=== Television ===
Year	Title	Character	Role
2014	La rosa de Guadalupe	Martha	La fuerza del pasado
2011	Ni contigo ni sin ti	Recurring role	Recurring role
2012	Por ella soy Eva	Special participation	Special participation
2012	Amor bravío	Ileana Sodi	Recurring role
2013	Que pobres tan ricos	Melina	Recurring Role
2014	Como dice el dicho	Clarabel	Cuando la limosna es grande (Season 4, Episode 60)
2015–17	El Señor de los Cielos	Oficial Evelyn Garcia	Recurring Role (Season 3, 4 & 5)
2016	Un dia cualquiera	Abril	Amantes (Episode 30)
2016	Hasta que te conocí	Leonor Berumen	Special participation
2016	El Chema	Oficial Evelyn García	Special participation (Season 1, Episode 0, 3)
2018	Jose Jose, el principe de la cancion	Laura	Special participation (Season 1, Episode10 )
2018	Segun Bibi TV Series	Mami Maniqui	Recurring Role
2018	La bella y las Bestias	Special Participation	Special Participation (Season 1, Episode 60)
2019	Doña Flor y sus dos maridos	Malba	Special Participation
TBD	Municipal MX	Police Officer	Police Officer

=== Stage ===
Year	Title	Character
2011	La Tempestad	Miranda
2012	Palomita Pop, apuntes sobre la immediatez	TBU
2014	Monólogo "María Woyzeck"	María
2015	Sepia	TBU
2015	El laberinto	Ariadna
2016	Maldito Amor	TBU
2016	No apagues la luz	Laura
2016	Limítrofe	TBU
2016	Juegos de Poder	Ida Horowicz
2018	Rotterdam	Alice
2019	Primera Dama	Fabiana
