= El Chema =

- Genre: Telenovela
- Created by: Luis Zelkowicz
- Written by: Carmina Narro; Iris Dubs; Juan Manuel Andrade; Luis Zelkowicz
- Directed by: Nicolás Di Blasi; Danny Gavidia
- Creative director: Olín Díaz
- Starring: Mauricio Ochmann; Mariana Seoane; Julio Bracho; Sergio Basañez; Itatí Cantoral
- Theme music composer: Poncho Lizárraga; Mario Quintero Lara
- Opening theme: "El Chema" by Banda el Recodo
- Country of origin: United States
- Original language: Spanish
- No. of seasons: 1
- No. of episodes: 84

Production
- Executive producers: Mauricio Ochmann; Carmen Cecilia Urbaneja; Mariana Iskandariani; Patricia Benitez
- Producer: Marco Antonio López
- Cinematography: Damián Aguilar; Luis Montalvo; Jorge Rubio Cazarín
- Editors: Perla Martínez; Ramiro Pardo
- Camera setup: Multi-camera
- Production companies: Argos Comunicación; Telemundo Studios

Original release
- Network: Telemundo
- Release: 6 December 2016 – 3 April 2017

Related
- El Señor de los Cielos

El Chema is an American crime television series premiered on Telemundo on December 6, 2016, and concluded on April 3, 2017. The series is produced by Argos Comunicación and Telemundo Studios for Telemundo. Starred and produced by Mauricio Ochmann. It is a spin-off of the series El Señor de los Cielos.

The first season consists of 84 episodes, and is available on Netflix as of July 1, 2017.

== Synopsis ==
The first season tells the story of how Chema Venegas (Mauricio Ochmann) got his start in organized crime and rose through the ranks to become the head of the cartel he runs in "El Señor de los Cielos." El Chema began breaking the law at a young age, transporting marijuana across the US-Mexican border when he was just a boy. Little by little, he worked his way up to become a successful and skillful leader, earning his place through bloodshed and brutality, in the history of drug trafficking. Since he was a young man, El Chema has been one of the most important public enemies of both the U.S. and Mexican governments.

== Cast ==
=== Main ===
- Mauricio Ochmann as El Chema
- Mariana Seoane as María Isabel "Mabel" Castaño
- Julio Bracho as Don Ricardo Almenar Paiva
- Sergio Basañez as Don Tobías Clark
- Itatí Cantoral as Doña Blanca

=== Also main ===
- Arcelia Ramírez as Doña Elvira Mendivil
- Leonardo Daniel as Don Alfredo "Feyo" Aguilera
- Fernando Noriega as Eutimio "Rojo" Flores
- Alexandra de la Mora as Inés Clark
- Francisco de la O as Gary Roberts
- Carla Carrillo as Amanda Almenar
- Gustavo Egelhaaf as Saúl Clark
- Jorge Luis Vázquez as Fabricio Ponce
- Alberto Casanova as Coronel Israel Centeno
- Guillermo Quintanilla as Don Isidro Robles
- Ari Brickman as Jeremy Andrews
- Pablo Bracho as Don Joaquín Venegas
- Fernando Solórzano as Don Óscar Cadena
- Sebastián Caicedo as El Tostado Yepes / Eleazar Yepes
- Luis Yeverino as Benito Narváez
- Hiromi Hayakawa as Lucy Li
- Julieta Grajales as Regina Campo
- Jorge Cárdenas as Carlos Rodríguez "El Pelusa"
- Pilar Fernández as Martha
- Adrián Rubio as Freddy Torres
- Daniel Rascón as El Toro
- Alexander Holtmann as Leslie Carroll
- Juan Ignacio Aranda as Ramiro Silva de la Garza
- Hector Molina as Morillo Juárez
- Carlos Balderrama as José Manuel Castillo "Manny"
- Pedro Giunti as Agente López
- Iñaki Goci as El Triste
- Mauricio Rousselon as Ernesto
- Adolfo Madera as Agente Trejo
- Dale Carley as Jones

=== Recurring ===
- Karla Carrillo as Salma Vidal
- Luis Gerónimo Abreu as Nelson Martínez "El Veneco"

=== Special guest stars ===
- Rodrigo Abed as César Silva de la Garza
- Bianca Calderón as Roxana Mondragón
- Marco Pérez as Guadalupe Robles
- Anai Urrego as Lorelay "Lay" Cadena
- Carmen Aub as Rutila Casillas
- Carlos Puente as Pompeyo
- Rafael Amaya as Aurelio Casillas
- Jesús Moré as Omar Terán
- Lambda García as Nerio Pereira
- Isela Vega as Celia
- Luisa Huertas as Nelly
- Plutarco Haza as Dalvio Navarrete / El Ingeniero
- Jorge Luis Moreno as Víctor Casillas Jr.
- Lorena del Castillo as Oficial Evelyn García
- Iván Tamayo as Jorge Elías Salazar
- Vanessa Villela as Emiliana Contreras
- Juan Ríos Cantú as General Daniel Jimenez Arroyo / El Letrudo
- Javier Díaz Dueñas as Don Anacleto "Cleto" Letrán
- Claudia La Gatta as Alina Martínez
- Fernanda Castillo as Mónica Robles
- Wendy de los Cobos as Aguasanta "Tata" Guerra
- Iván Arana as Ismael Casillas Guerra
- Alejandro López as El Super Javi
- Rossana Nájera as Auristela Durán
- Scarlet Gruber as Young Blanca
- Alejandro Speitzer as Young Ricardo Almenar Paiva

== Production ==
The original series is based on the fictional character and is not related to the life of Chapo Guzmán.

Telemundo confirmed on May 15, 2016, that the series would see a spinoff based upon actor Mauricio Ochmann's character 'El Chema'. On September 21, 2016, Telemundo confirmed that production officially started. Telemundo would release exclusive web videos on November 15, 2016, explaining the title character's backstory including tying in the title character's last appearance in El Señor de los Cielos to the start of the events of the spinoff.

Actress and music artist Mariana Seoane also participates in the series as "Mabel", and composed songs for the series. Itatí Cantoral also confirmed her participation in the series as a villain, Cantoral and Seoane are more recognized for work for Televisa.

== Rating ==
Viewership and ratings per season of El Chema
Season	Timeslot (ET)	Episodes	First aired		Last aired		Avg. viewers (millions)
Season	Timeslot (ET)	Episodes	Date	Viewers (millions)	Date	Viewers (millions)	Avg. viewers (millions)
1	Mon–Fri 10pm/9c	84	December 6, 2016	2.43	April 3, 2017	2.56	2.01

=== Episodes ===
No.	Title	Original release date	US viewers (millions)
1	"Extradición dilatada"	December 6, 2016	2.43
2	"Espectacular fuga"	December 7, 2016	2.21
3	"Narco en la TV"	December 8, 2016	N/A
4	"Poder afrodisíaco"	December 9, 2016	N/A
5	"Infancia turbulenta"	December 12, 2016	2.03
6	"Joven matón"	December 13, 2016	N/A
7	"Convertido en asesino"	December 14, 2016	N/A
8	"Buscan al asesino"	December 15, 2016	N/A
9	"Amor prohibido"	December 16, 2016	N/A
10	"Preocupación de madre"	December 19, 2016	N/A
11	"Ascenso marca prioridades"	December 20, 2016	N/A
12	"La verdad duele"	December 21, 2016	N/A
13	"Tientan al diablo"	December 22, 2016	N/A
14	"Tráfico de armas"	December 23, 2016	1.46
15	"Amor por conveniencia"	December 26, 2016	1.81
16	"De hombre a hombre"	December 27, 2016	1.89
17	"Narcos en guerra"	December 28, 2016	1.80
18	"Misión cumplida"	December 29, 2016	1.80
19	"Mensajera y espía"	December 30, 2016	1.62
20	"¿Chivo expiatorio?"	January 2, 2017	2.00
21	"El Chema cae preso"	January 3, 2017	1.86
22	"Ansias de libertad"	January 4, 2017	2.03
23	"Plomo a la competencia"	January 5, 2017	1.95
24	"Jugosas amapolas"	January 6, 2017	1.49
25	"Despedida de soltera"	January 9, 2017	1.82
26	"¿Marcha atrás?"	January 10, 2017	N/A
27	"Cóctel: boda y negocios"	January 11, 2017	1.85
28	"Sueños torcidos"	January 12, 2017	1.80
29	"Machista despiadado"	January 13, 2017	1.70
30	"Torres, el informante"	January 16, 2017	1.97
31	"Mujeres, nunca sobran"	January 17, 2017	1.91
32	"Plan siniestro"	January 18, 2017	1.70
33	"Visita sorpresa"	January 19, 2017	1.66
34	"Trampa al soplón"	January 20, 2017	1.77
35	"Burlan a la DEA"	January 23, 2017	1.94
36	"Traidor acorralado"	January 24, 2017	1.78
37	"Propuesta indecente"	January 25, 2017	1.80
38	"Triángulo amoroso"	January 26, 2017	1.66
39	"Pecado mortal"	January 27, 2017	1.68
40	"Pitazo de oro"	January 30, 2017	1.84
41	"El Chema ya es un capo"	January 31, 2017	1.91
42	"Emotiva despedida"	February 1, 2017	1.79
43	"Rendición de cuentas"	February 2, 2017	1.81
44	"Aventuras peligrosas"	February 3, 2017	1.63
45	"Ajusticiar es limpiar"	February 6, 2017	1.86
46	"Mabel quiere un hijo"	February 7, 2017	1.73
47	"En manos de la DEA"	February 8, 2017	1.69
48	"Mabel es el anzuelo"	February 9, 2017	1.89
49	"La astucia de El Chema"	February 10, 2017	1.68
50	"Amanda, la amante"	February 13, 2017	1.63
51	"El Chema: la otra fuga"	February 14, 2017	1.79
52	"Emboscada sangrienta"	February 15, 2017	1.84
53	"Negocio de vida o muerte"	February 16, 2017	1.79
54	"Rumbo a Mexicali"	February 17, 2017	1.61
55	"Dulce venganza"	February 20, 2017	1.78
56	"El secreto de Mabel"	February 21, 2017	2.08
57	"Al acecho"	February 22, 2017	1.88
58	"El sabor de la guerra"	February 23, 2017	1.79
59	"Lo quieren vivo o muerto"	February 24, 2017	1.83
60	"Plomo y estampida"	February 27, 2017	1.89
61	"Contra los corruptos"	February 28, 2017	1.70
62	"Enemigo en común"	March 1, 2017	1.70
63	"Contra las cuerdas"	March 2, 2017	1.66
64	"Nuevos socios, mejor oferta"	March 3, 2017	1.74
65	"Encuentro y despedida"	March 6, 2017	1.61
66	"El silencio de Marta"	March 7, 2017	1.57
67	"Duda razonable"	March 8, 2017	1.68
68	"Más aliados por la cocaína"	March 9, 2017	1.72
69	"Torturan a Joaquín"	March 10, 2017	1.68
70	"A la caza de El Chema"	March 13, 2017	1.95
71	"Contraataque"	March 14, 2017	1.85
72	"Tentación incontrolable"	March 15, 2017	1.91
73	"Peligro inminente"	March 16, 2017	1.77
74	"Mordaza a la prensa"	March 17, 2017	1.77
75	"Maniobra emocional"	March 20, 2017	1.76
76	"Amenaza de linchamiento"	March 21, 2017	1.74
77	"Socio a la fuerza"	March 22, 2017	1.86
78	"Ponce sale de cacería"	March 23, 2017	1.91
79	"Nelson se sale con la suya"	March 24, 2017	1.60
80	"Ricardo, desenmascarado"	March 27, 2017	1.79
81	"Venganza diabólica"	March 29, 2017	1.91
82	"Revancha frustrada"	March 30, 2017	2.00
83	"Máquina de matar"	March 31, 2017	1.60
84	"Merca maldita"	April 3, 2017	2.56

== Awards and nominations ==
Year	Award	Category	Recipient	Result
2017	Your World Awards	Favorite Súper Series	El Chema	Nominated
2017	Your World Awards	Favorite Lead Actor	Mauricio Ochmann	Nominated
2017	Your World Awards	The Best Bad Boy	Sergio Basañez	Nominated
2017	Your World Awards	The Best Bad Girl	Mariana Seoane	Nominated
2017	Your World Awards	Favorite Actress	Itati Cantoral	Nominated
2017	Your World Awards	The Perfect Couple	Mauricio Ochmann and Mariana Seoane	Nominated
2017	Produ Awards	Director- Serie, Superserie or Telenovela of the Year	Danny Gavidia	Nominated
