= Alan Slim =

Mexican actor (born 1983)

- Born: 19 December 1983 (age 42); Mexicali, Baja California, Mexico
- Occupation: Actor
- Years active: 2014–present
- Known for: Hasta el fin del mundo; Tres veces Ana; El Señor de los Cielos

Alan Slim (born 19 December 1983) is a Mexican actor.

== Biography ==
Slim, a distant relative of magnate Carlos Slim, was born in Mexicali, Baja California, Mexico. He studied acting at the Centro de Educación Artística of Televisa. He graduated as a psychologist, but does not practice.

== Filmography ==
Television roles
Year	Title	Role	Notes
2014	Como dice el dicho	Miguel	Recurring role (season 4); 32 episodes
2014–2015	Hasta el fin del mundo	Christian Blanco	Recurring role; 89 episodes
2015	Amor de barrio	Himself	Episode: "La verdad no tiene precio"
2015	Amores con trampa	Himself Orlando Jeremías	Recurring role; 21 episodes Segment: "Amor imposible"
2015	Lo imperdonable	Arturo	Recurring role; 27 episodes
2016	Tres veces Ana	Javier	Recurring role; 56 episodes
2017–2024	El Señor de los Cielos	Jaime Ernesto Rosales	Recurring role (seasons 5–9); 342 episodes
2021	Malverde: El Santo Patrón	Matías Galavis	Main cast
2023	Los 50	Himself	Contestant
2025	Juegos de amor y poder	Germán Torres	
2025	Dinastía Casillas	Jaime Ernesto Rosales	Recurring role
2026	El otro padre	Alejandro	Recurring role
