= List of El Señor de los Cielos episodes =

This is a list of episodes for the Telemundo series El Señor de los Cielos. On 15 February 2022, the series was renewed for an eighth season, that premiered on 17 January 2023. On 11 May 2023, Telemundo renewed the series for a ninth season that premiered on 13 February 2024. The tenth and final season premiered on 7 July 2026.

During the course of the series, 887 episodes of El Señor de los Cielos aired over ten seasons, concluding on 12 November 2026.

== Series overview ==
Season	Episodes	Originally released	
Season	Episodes	First released	Last released
1	74	15 April 2013	5 August 2013
2	84	26 May 2014	22 September 2014
3	104	21 April 2015	21 September 2015
4	80	28 March 2016	18 July 2016
5	95	20 June 2017	2 November 2017
6	99	8 May 2018	24 September 2018
7	75	14 October 2019	31 January 2020
8	88	17 January 2023	22 May 2023
9	94	13 February 2024	26 June 2024
10	90	7 July 2026	12 November 2026

== Episodes ==
=== Season 1 (2013) ===
No. overall	No. in season	Title	Original release date
1	1	"Arranca la balacera"	April 15, 2013
2	2	"Aurelio traiciona a Pablo"	April 16, 2013
3	3	"Cayó el narco"	April 17, 2013
4	4	"¡Se salvó!"	April 18, 2013
5	5	"¡Cásate conmigo!"	April 19, 2013
6	6	"La boda del año"	April 22, 2013
7	7	"Murió envenenado"	April 23, 2013
8	8	"Soy el rey"	April 24, 2013
9	9	"Pacto de narcos"	April 26, 2013
10	10	"Rescate suicida"	April 29, 2013
11	11	"¡Qué tentación!"	April 30, 2013
12	12	"Estoy embarazada"	May 1, 2013
13	13	"¡La pagarás!"	May 2, 2013
14	14	"Los secuestraron"	May 3, 2013
15	15	"¡Lo liberaron!"	May 6, 2013
16	16	"Celos que matan"	May 7, 2013
17	17	"¡No te mueras!"	May 8, 2013
18	18	"Aprovéchate de mí"	May 9, 2013
19	19	"Un cuadro de millones"	May 10, 2013
20	20	"Las narcotiendas"	May 13, 2013
21	21	"La primera sospecha"	May 14, 2013
22	22	"La foto de Casillas"	May 15, 2013
23	23	"En los titulares"	May 16, 2013
24	24	"Fuera del negocio"	May 17, 2013
25	25	"Aquí tiene mi renuncia"	May 20, 2013
26	26	"Tentaciones peligrosas"	May 21, 2013
27	27	"Todo por venganza"	May 22, 2013
28	28	"Secuestrada"	May 23, 2013
29	29	"Quién es el infiltrado"	May 24, 2013
30	30	"Cuídate la espalda"	May 27, 2013
31	31	"Principales sospechosos"	May 28, 2013
32	32	"El expediente"	May 29, 2013
33	33	"La amante de tu hijo"	May 30, 2013
34	34	"Me las pagarás"	May 31, 2013
35	35	"La libreta"	June 3, 2013
36	36	"Choque con criminales"	June 5, 2013
37	37	"Fuera del camino"	June 6, 2013
38	38	"Nexos con el narcotráfico"	June 10, 2013
39	39	"Sumando muertes"	June 11, 2013
40	40	"Algo está cambiando"	June 12, 2013
41	41	"Nuevo romance"	June 13, 2013
42	42	"Déjame escapar"	June 14, 2013
43	43	"No me veas la cara"	June 17, 2013
44	44	"Esta vida no es para mí"	June 18, 2013
45	45	"Confesión de amor"	June 19, 2013
46	46	"En busca de Ximena"	June 20, 2013
47	47	"El regreso"	June 21, 2013
48	48	"Golpe al alma"	June 24, 2013
49	49	"Tiempos de infarto"	June 25, 2013
50	50	"Provocadora"	June 26, 2013
51	51	"Contrarreloj"	June 27, 2013
52	52	"La traición"	June 28, 2013
53	53	"Encrucijada"	July 1, 2013
54	54	"Los dueños del mundo"	July 2, 2013
55	55	"Tras los pasos de Casillas"	July 3, 2013
56	56	"La boca bien cerrada"	July 8, 2013
57	57	"Muerta de los celos"	July 10, 2013
58	58	"La amenaza"	July 11, 2013
59	59	"No diga nada"	July 12, 2013
60	60	"Prisionera en mi casa"	July 15, 2013
61	61	"La culpa es de ella"	July 16, 2013
62	62	"La fuga"	July 17, 2013
63	63	"Camino a la verdad"	July 18, 2013
64	64	"El nombre del padre"	July 19, 2013
65	65	"Finalmente juntos"	July 22, 2013
66	66	"Secuestrados"	July 23, 2013
67	67	"Complot"	July 24, 2013
68	68	"Los platos rotos"	July 25, 2013
69	69	"Sin mí te mueres"	July 26, 2013
70	70	"Furioso y en la mira"	July 29, 2013
71	71	"Dura balacera"	July 30, 2013
72	72	"Volver a empezar"	August 1, 2013
73	73	"Una nueva cara"	August 2, 2013
74	74	"Vivo o muerto"	August 5, 2013

=== Season 2 (2014) ===
No. overall	No. in season	Title	Original release date
75	1	"Sorpresa y venganza"	May 26, 2014
76	2	"Rescate y emboscada"	May 27, 2014
77	3	"Escape"	May 28, 2014
78	4	"Nuevos horizontes"	May 29, 2014
79	5	"Trampa"	May 30, 2014
80	6	"Reencuentro"	June 2, 2014
81	7	"Detención"	June 3, 2014
82	8	"Propuestas"	June 4, 2014
83	9	"Perdóname mi amor"	June 5, 2014
84	10	"Estrategia"	June 6, 2014
85	11	"Escondite"	June 9, 2014
86	12	"Entrega especial"	June 10, 2014
87	13	"Bombas"	June 11, 2014
88	14	"Celos"	June 12, 2014
89	15	"Muerte inocente"	June 13, 2014
90	16	"Confesiones"	June 16, 2014
91	17	"La condena"	June 17, 2014
92	18	"Rehén"	June 18, 2014
93	19	"Amenaza"	June 19, 2014
94	20	"Libertad"	June 20, 2014
95	21	"Al descubierto"	June 23, 2014
96	22	"Determinación"	June 24, 2014
97	23	"Decisiones"	June 25, 2014
98	24	"El fruto del amor"	June 26, 2014
99	25	"Heriberto"	June 27, 2014
100	26	"El amor de Lai"	June 30, 2014
101	27	"Unión"	July 1, 2014
102	28	"Traición"	July 2, 2014
103	29	"Malos entendidos"	July 3, 2014
104	30	"Nuevas oportunidades"	July 7, 2014
105	31	"Denuncia"	July 8, 2014
106	32	"Intento de soborno"	July 9, 2014
107	33	"La vieja casa"	July 10, 2014
108	34	"Miedo"	July 11, 2014
109	35	"Huida"	July 14, 2014
110	36	"Impedimento"	July 15, 2014
111	37	"Perdida"	July 16, 2014
112	38	"Venganza"	July 17, 2014
113	39	"Secuestro"	July 18, 2014
114	40	"Emboscada"	July 21, 2014
115	41	"Secreto"	July 22, 2014
116	42	"Reclamo"	July 23, 2014
117	43	"Danilo Ferro"	July 24, 2014
118	44	"Asesino"	July 25, 2014
119	45	"La Gober"	July 28, 2014
120	46	"Confesión"	July 29, 2014
121	47	"Seducción"	July 30, 2014
122	48	"Fuga"	July 31, 2014
123	49	"Susto"	August 1, 2014
124	50	"Ave María Purísima"	August 4, 2014
125	51	"Tortura"	August 5, 2014
126	52	"Atracción"	August 6, 2014
127	53	"Mónica"	August 7, 2014
128	54	"Encuestas"	August 8, 2014
129	55	"Pacto"	August 11, 2014
130	56	"Víctima"	August 12, 2014
131	57	"Condena"	August 13, 2014
132	58	"Traicionado"	August 14, 2014
133	59	"Matilde"	August 15, 2014
134	60	"Enfrentamiento"	August 18, 2014
135	61	"Rodeados"	August 19, 2014
136	62	"Eliminado"	August 20, 2014
137	63	"Guerra"	August 22, 2014
138	64	"Ataque"	August 25, 2014
139	65	"Manotas"	August 26, 2014
140	66	"Informante"	August 27, 2014
141	67	"Búsqueda"	August 28, 2014
142	68	"Patrón"	August 29, 2014
143	69	"Rutila"	September 1, 2014
144	70	"Desaparición"	September 2, 2014
145	71	"Manipulación"	September 3, 2014
146	72	"Inseguridad"	September 4, 2014
147	73	"Protección"	September 5, 2014
148	74	"Apoyo"	September 8, 2014
149	75	"El Escuadrón de la Muerte"	September 9, 2014
150	76	"Negociación"	September 10, 2014
151	77	"Entrega"	September 11, 2014
152	78	"General Garnica"	September 12, 2014
153	79	"Sicarios"	September 15, 2014
154	80	"Ximena"	September 16, 2014
155	81	"Despedida"	September 17, 2014
156	82	"Engaño"	September 18, 2014
157	83	"Chema Venegas"	September 19, 2014
158	84	"Leonor Ballesteros"	September 22, 2014

=== Season 3 (2015) ===
No. overall	No. in season	Title	Original release date
159	1	"Odio sin fin"	April 21, 2015
160	2	"En familia"	April 22, 2015
161	3	"La Bestia"	April 23, 2015
162	4	"Asedio burlado"	April 24, 2015
163	5	"Proximidad"	April 27, 2015
164	6	"El pacto"	April 28, 2015
165	7	"El ajuste"	April 29, 2015
166	8	"Asalto mortal"	May 1, 2015
167	9	"Escurridizo"	May 4, 2015
168	10	"La sentencia"	May 5, 2015
169	11	"Intransigente"	May 6, 2015
170	12	"Reclamos"	May 7, 2015
171	13	"Inversiones"	May 8, 2015
172	14	"Viuda culpada"	May 11, 2015
173	15	"Todo sale mal"	May 12, 2015
174	16	"Destrozados"	May 14, 2015
175	17	"Nuevo Chacorta"	May 15, 2015
176	18	"El Seductor"	May 18, 2015
177	19	"Guerra familiar"	May 19, 2015
178	20	"Acto atroz"	May 20, 2015
179	21	"Desesperada"	May 21, 2015
180	22	"Alianza"	May 22, 2015
181	23	"Orden mortal"	May 25, 2015
182	24	"Sacrificio"	May 26, 2015
183	25	"Debilidad"	May 27, 2015
184	26	"Ultrajada"	May 28, 2015
185	27	"Imperdonable"	May 29, 2015
186	28	"Cara a cara"	June 1, 2015
187	29	"Pacto siniestro"	June 3, 2015
188	30	"Padre enfurecido"	June 4, 2015
189	31	"Revelaciones"	June 8, 2015
190	32	"Emboscado"	June 9, 2015
191	33	"Lealtad"	June 10, 2015
192	34	"Juntos"	June 11, 2015
193	35	"Jefe real"	June 12, 2015
194	36	"Soplones"	June 15, 2015
195	37	"La representante"	June 16, 2015
196	38	"Intermediaria"	June 17, 2015
197	39	"En crisis"	June 18, 2015
198	40	"Apoyo incondicional"	June 22, 2015
199	41	"Traicionada"	June 23, 2015
200	42	"Beso bienvenido"	June 24, 2015
201	43	"Arrepentido"	June 25, 2015
202	44	"Celos asesinos"	June 26, 2015
203	45	"Pacto de amor"	June 29, 2015
204	46	"Mi hombre"	June 30, 2015
205	47	"Irresistible"	July 1, 2015
206	48	"Tu calvario"	July 2, 2015
207	49	"Acercamiento"	July 3, 2015
208	50	"Socia de infarto"	July 6, 2015
209	51	"Las cuentas"	July 7, 2015
210	52	"Por puro placer"	July 8, 2015
211	53	"De tal palo..."	July 9, 2015
212	54	"Cambio de rubro"	July 10, 2015
213	55	"Bajo fuego"	July 13, 2015
214	56	"El Güero"	July 14, 2015
215	57	"Belén y Aurelio"	July 15, 2015
216	58	"De nuevo"	July 16, 2015
217	59	"Sana y salva"	July 17, 2015
218	60	"Sospechosa"	July 20, 2015
219	61	"Mi papá"	July 21, 2015
220	62	"Entre bandidos"	July 22, 2015
221	63	"Acá te espero"	July 23, 2015
222	64	"A salvo"	July 24, 2015
223	65	"Pasión"	July 28, 2015
224	66	"En sus brazos"	July 29, 2015
225	67	"Intento"	July 30, 2015
226	68	"Cornudo"	July 31, 2015
227	69	"Todo estalla"	August 3, 2015
228	70	"Degollada"	August 4, 2015
229	71	"Despedida"	August 5, 2015
230	72	"Otro whisky"	August 6, 2015
231	73	"La tía Mónica"	August 7, 2015
232	74	"Sorprendida"	August 10, 2015
233	75	"Huir de la furia"	August 11, 2015
234	76	"Dolor"	August 12, 2015
235	77	"Sin control"	August 13, 2015
236	78	"La señora"	August 14, 2015
237	79	"De una vez"	August 17, 2015
238	80	"Choque de trenes"	August 18, 2015
239	81	"Fue su tío"	August 19, 2015
240	82	"A golpes"	August 21, 2015
241	83	"Lavado de dinero"	August 24, 2015
242	84	"Planes en grande"	August 25, 2015
243	85	"De la madriguera"	August 26, 2015
244	86	"Comprando"	August 27, 2015
245	87	"Los 34"	August 28, 2015
246	88	"Pago con sangre"	August 31, 2015
247	89	"Leonor muere"	September 1, 2015
248	90	"Bajo ataque"	September 1, 2015
249	91	"Ojo por ojo"	September 2, 2015
250	92	"Un riñón"	September 3, 2015
251	93	"El Oficial"	September 4, 2015
252	94	"De la selva"	September 7, 2015
253	95	"La lista"	September 8, 2015
254	96	"La era"	September 9, 2015
255	97	"De exportación"	September 10, 2015
256	98	"Perdido"	September 11, 2015
257	99	"El trofeo"	September 14, 2015
258	100	"La caída"	September 15, 2015
259	101	"Los hilos"	September 16, 2015
260	102	"Un nuevo negocio"	September 17, 2015
261	103	"En la mira"	September 18, 2015
262	104	"El Diablo soy yo"	September 21, 2015

=== Season 4 (2016) ===
No. overall	No. in season	Title	Original release date
263	1	"Rutila sobrevive al atentado"	March 28, 2016
264	2	"Aurelio conoce a su hijo Ismael"	March 29, 2016
265	3	"Aurelio presenta a su huerco"	March 30, 2016
266	4	"Casillas tras El Feyo"	March 31, 2016
267	5	"El Feyo se escapa"	April 1, 2016
268	6	"Aurelio seduce a La Tata"	April 4, 2016
269	7	"Mónica en una encrucijada"	April 5, 2016
270	8	"Misión para Esperanza"	April 6, 2016
271	9	"Mónica pierde el bebé"	April 7, 2016
272	10	"Aurelio reprende a Víctor"	April 8, 2016
273	11	"Aurelio tortura al Chatarrero"	April 11, 2016
274	12	"Amenaza de La Tata"	April 12, 2016
275	13	"Amparo desea a Aurelio"	April 13, 2016
276	14	"Víctor elimina a Eleazar"	April 14, 2016
277	15	"Elisa y Monteverde secuestrados"	April 15, 2016
278	16	"Aurelio pide perdón a Rutila"	April 18, 2016
279	17	"Aurelio besa a Amparo a la fuerza"	April 19, 2016
280	18	"Casillas golpea a Marcado"	April 20, 2016
281	19	"Amor imposible"	April 21, 2016
282	20	"Casillas vulnerable"	April 22, 2016
283	21	"Amparo se confiesa"	April 25, 2016
284	22	"Amparo y Aurelio hacen el amor"	April 26, 2016
285	23	"Tim es eliminado"	April 27, 2016
286	24	"Rutila es vengada"	April 29, 2016
287	25	"Mónica abofetea a Rutila"	May 2, 2016
288	26	"Nicandro está arrepentido"	May 3, 2016
289	27	"El Tijeras se queda sin su merca"	May 4, 2016
290	28	"El Feyo carga con el muerto"	May 5, 2016
291	29	"Advertencia a Esperanza"	May 6, 2016
292	30	"Riñón millonario"	May 9, 2016
293	31	"Mónica enfrenta al soplón de Feyo"	May 10, 2016
294	32	"Adiós riñón de Niki"	May 11, 2016
295	33	"Aurelio desespera por un riñón"	May 12, 2016
296	34	"Mónica salva a Luzma"	May 13, 2016
297	35	"En busca de Nazareno"	May 16, 2016
298	36	"Connie ama a Aurelio"	May 17, 2016
299	37	"Connie se vuelve un estorbo"	May 18, 2016
300	38	"Aurelio seduce a Mónica"	May 19, 2016
301	39	"Rutila juega con fuego"	May 20, 2016
302	40	"Nazareno acorralado"	May 23, 2016
303	41	"Aurelio rescata a Luzma"	May 23, 2016
304	42	"Casillas aleja a Luzma"	May 24, 2016
305	43	"Listo para la cirugía"	May 25, 2016
306	44	"Nuevo peligro para Aurelio"	May 26, 2016
307	45	"Ataque a sangre y fuego"	May 30, 2016
308	46	"Víctor celoso de Aurelio"	May 31, 2016
309	47	"La cabeza del embajador"	June 1, 2016
310	48	"Tras La Felina"	June 2, 2016
311	49	"Mónica se alía con La Felina"	June 3, 2016
312	50	"Dalvio desenmascarado"	June 6, 2016
313	51	"Mónica sospecha de La Felina"	June 7, 2016
314	52	"Ataque en marcha"	June 8, 2016
315	53	"La Tata defiende a su novio"	June 9, 2016
316	54	"La Tata enfrenta al Ingeniero"	June 10, 2016
317	55	"Chacortica se siente traicionado"	June 13, 2016
318	56	"Pedido especial de Mónica"	June 14, 2016
319	57	"Contra Los Colombianos"	June 15, 2016
320	58	"Aurelio y Víctor pelean por Mónica"	June 16, 2016
321	59	"Amor confesado"	June 17, 2016
322	60	"Aurelio muere de celos"	June 20, 2016
323	61	"Dolorosa despedida"	June 21, 2016
324	62	"Aurelio despechado"	June 22, 2016
325	63	"Chacortica planta cara"	June 23, 2016
326	64	"Ismael, la mano derecha"	June 24, 2016
327	65	"La periodista suelta la sopa"	June 27, 2016
328	66	"Pedida matrimonial"	June 28, 2016
329	67	"Aliados problemáticos"	June 29, 2016
330	68	"Aurelio ordena al presidente"	June 30, 2016
331	69	"Eva Ernestina sentenciada"	July 1, 2016
332	70	"Lencho en la mira"	July 4, 2016
333	71	"El turno de Garnica"	July 5, 2016
334	72	"Humillación cobrada"	July 6, 2016
335	73	"Juramento de hija"	July 7, 2016
336	74	"Aurelio conoce a Emiliana"	July 8, 2016
337	75	"Nueva conquista"	July 11, 2016
338	76	"El Feyo pasa a la acción"	July 12, 2016
339	77	"Fin de un enemigo"	July 13, 2016
340	78	"Casillas seduce a Emiliana"	July 14, 2016
341	79	"Aurelio cazado"	July 15, 2016
342	80	"Trampa burlada"	July 18, 2016

=== Season 5 (2017) ===
No. overall	No. in season	Title	Original release date	US viewers (millions)
343	1	"Sed de venganza"	June 20, 2017	2.27
344	2	"Hay un Plan B"	June 21, 2017	1.97
345	3	"Casillas contra Casillas"	June 22, 2017	2.30
346	4	"Tras el pez gordo"	June 23, 2017	1.81
347	5	"La fuga de La Felina"	June 26, 2017	1.80
348	6	"Nexos con el narcotráfico"	June 27, 2017	1.86
349	7	"Mediadora"	June 28, 2017	1.82
350	8	"Corazón partido"	June 29, 2017	1.92
351	9	"Encuentros decisivos"	June 30, 2017	1.71
352	10	"Esperanza, la informante"	July 3, 2017	1.80
353	11	"Emiliana declara la guerra"	July 4, 2017	1.45
354	12	"Desaparecida"	July 5, 2017	1.77
355	13	"Despiertan al Diablo"	July 6, 2017	1.83
356	14	"Lluvia de balas"	July 7, 2017	1.68
357	15	"Plomo en casa de Rutila"	July 10, 2017	1.86
358	16	"El soplón"	July 11, 2017	1.86
359	17	"Emiliana suplica por su vida"	July 12, 2017	1.81
360	18	"El presidente como cómplice"	July 13, 2017	1.79
361	19	"Tambores de guerra"	July 14, 2017	1.49
362	20	"Fuego cruzado"	July 17, 2017	1.86
363	21	"Desenmascarar al presidente"	July 18, 2017	1.84
364	22	"Choque de titanes"	July 19, 2017	1.77
365	23	"Más poder, segura venganza"	July 20, 2017	1.51
366	24	"Robo cibernético"	July 21, 2017	1.65
367	25	"El punto débil"	July 24, 2017	1.90
368	26	"El imperio de Casillas"	July 25, 2017	1.83
369	27	"Un remolino de poder"	July 26, 2017	1.89
370	28	"Plan sangriento"	July 27, 2017	1.64
371	29	"Casillas vs. Doble 30"	July 28, 2017	1.48
372	30	"El escudo ante la guerra"	July 31, 2017	1.72
373	31	"Siniestro en el antro"	August 1, 2017	1.78
374	32	"Conexión presidencial"	August 2, 2017	1.78
375	33	"La jugada de Terán"	August 3, 2017	1.66
376	34	"Los Casillas frente a frente"	August 4, 2017	1.57
377	35	"Cita sangrienta"	August 7, 2017	2.25
378	36	"El plan inesperado"	August 8, 2017	2.18
379	37	"Infeliz encuentro"	August 9, 2017	1.88
380	38	"Escándalo a la vista"	August 10, 2017	1.99
381	39	"El presidente, un sicario"	August 11, 2017	1.76
382	40	"Callar a un testigo clave"	August 14, 2017	2.00
383	41	"Más de una baja"	August 15, 2017	2.02
384	42	"Rodean a los Casillas"	August 16, 2017	1.95
385	43	"Drones, balas y allanamiento"	August 17, 2017	1.98
386	44	"Condenados a morir"	August 18, 2017	1.74
387	45	"Declara o destapan la olla"	August 21, 2017	2.14
388	46	"Rivero firma su sentencia"	August 22, 2017	2.09
389	47	"Rutila en la mira"	August 23, 2017	1.96
390	48	"Callan al informante"	August 25, 2017	1.86
391	49	"Contra la pared"	August 28, 2017	2.11
392	50	"Morir, antes que entregarse"	August 29, 2017	2.11
393	51	"Al pie de la letra"	August 30, 2017	2.03
394	52	"¿Traición a la patria?"	August 31, 2017	2.05
395	53	"Pilar muere de celos"	September 1, 2017	1.62
396	54	"Triángulo de amor"	September 4, 2017	2.10
397	55	"Ninón "se encarga" de su rival"	September 6, 2017	2.44
398	56	"La estampida de Esperanza"	September 7, 2017	2.14
399	57	"La frustración de Mónica"	September 8, 2017	1.77
400	58	"Casillas jura vengarse"	September 11, 2017	2.09
401	59	"Uzcátegui, en terreno movedizo"	September 12, 2017	1.75
402	60	"Una trampa para Aurelio"	September 13, 2017	2.14
403	61	"La Felina no come cuentos"	September 14, 2017	1.81
404	62	"Peligrosa atracción"	September 15, 2017	1.67
405	63	"De cara a la prensa"	September 18, 2017	1.95
406	64	"Ex amantes que negocian"	September 19, 2017	1.87
407	65	"Rastrean a Esperanza"	September 20, 2017	1.95
408	66	"Más que un mensajero"	September 21, 2017	1.90
409	67	"Torturan a Salazar"	September 22, 2017	1.99
410	68	"Alianza para matar"	September 25, 2017	1.94
411	69	"De hombre a hombre"	September 26, 2017	1.92
412	70	"Testigo, pero no cómplice"	September 27, 2017	2.04
413	71	"Traición o negocios"	September 28, 2017	2.08
414	72	"La depresión de Esperanza"	September 29, 2017	2.00
415	73	"La retirada de Casillas"	October 2, 2017	2.09
416	74	"Treinta toneladas lo valen"	October 3, 2017	2.08
417	75	"El secuestro"	October 4, 2017	1.97
418	76	"Casillas al rescate"	October 5, 2017	2.06
419	77	"Sicariato"	October 6, 2017	N/A
420	78	"El coraje de Ninón"	October 9, 2017	1.96
421	79	"Casillas y sus dos batallas"	October 10, 2017	1.97
422	80	"Arrasan con todo"	October 11, 2017	2.07
423	81	"El poder del billete"	October 12, 2017	2.07
424	82	"En busca de El Chema"	October 13, 2017	N/A
425	83	"Amante incrédulo"	October 16, 2017	2.04
426	84	"Presidente sin escrúpulos"	October 17, 2017	N/A
427	85	"El blanco es Esperanza"	October 18, 2017	1.78
428	86	"¿Infiltrados?"	October 19, 2017	2.06
429	87	"Oídos sordos"	October 20, 2017	1.81
430	88	"La próxima víctima"	October 23, 2017	N/A
431	89	"Casillas se queda con Isidro"	October 24, 2017	N/A
432	90	"Sin piedad"	October 25, 2017	N/A
433	91	"El momento de la verdad"	October 27, 2017	2.04
434	92	"Casillas gana otra vez"	October 30, 2017	2.13
435	93	"Caen en la trampa"	October 31, 2017	N/A
436	94	"Al rescate de Rutila"	November 1, 2017	2.22
437	95	"La sombra de la muerte"	November 2, 2017	2.54

=== Season 6 (2018) ===
No. overall	No. in season	Title	Original release date	US viewers (millions)
438	1	"A la caza de Aurelio Casillas"	8 May 2018	2.14
439	2	"Casillas declara la guerra"	9 May 2018	2.05
440	3	"Casillas encierra a su amante"	10 May 2018	1.73
441	4	"Atacan a Casillas y a Rutila"	11 May 2018	1.70
442	5	"Casillas y Cabo crean alianzas"	14 May 2018	1.69
443	6	"Bloquean a Casillas"	15 May 2018	1.69
444	7	"Casillas contra El Cabo"	16 May 2018	1.70
445	8	"Corina prueba su lealtad"	17 May 2018	1.73
446	9	"Casillas secuestra a Castillo"	18 May 2018	1.60
447	10	"Todos en contra de Casillas"	21 May 2018	1.57
448	11	"Casillas tiene nueva conquista"	22 May 2018	1.65
449	12	"Quezada destrona al Cabo"	23 May 2018	1.60
450	13	"Casillas en el infierno turco"	24 May 2018	1.74
451	14	"Aurelio saca su lado oscuro"	25 May 2018	1.36
452	15	"Aurelio se molesta con Ámbar"	28 May 2018	1.38
453	16	"Ámbar sorprende a Casillas"	29 May 2018	1.54
454	17	"Aurelio y Ámbar, tal para cual"	30 May 2018	1.64
455	18	"Acorralan a Casillas"	31 May 2018	1.57
456	19	"Aurelio amenaza a la guerrilla"	1 June 2018	1.37
457	20	"La DEA tras El Cabo"	4 June 2018	1.52
458	21	"Aurelio llega a Cuba"	5 June 2018	1.59
459	22	"Casillas provoca al diablo"	6 June 2018	1.49
460	23	"El Cabo se enamora"	7 June 2018	1.51
461	24	"El Cabo al descubierto"	8 June 2018	1.48
462	25	"Rutila se entera que Javi vive"	11 June 2018	1.57
463	26	"Rutila se reencuentra con Javi"	12 June 2018	1.85
464	27	"El Cabo roba terreno a Aurelio"	13 June 2018	1.65
465	28	"Rutila seduce a Súper Javi"	14 June 2018	1.73
466	29	"Casillas mueve su ficha"	15 June 2018	1.42
467	30	"El Cabo vs el presidente"	18 June 2018	1.73
468	31	"Casillas se burla del régimen"	19 June 2018	1.74
469	32	"Javi y Rutila salvan a Kashi"	20 June 2018	1.60
470	33	"Aurelio evalúa presidenciables"	21 June 2018	1.67
471	34	"Casillas va por la droga legal"	22 June 2018	1.40
472	35	"Ámbar debe entregarse a la DEA"	25 June 2018	1.68
473	36	"Rutila enfurece con Súper Javi"	26 June 2018	1.65
474	37	"Aurelio rapta a otro candidato"	27 June 2018	1.69
475	38	"Casillas ordena a sus mujeres"	28 June 2018	1.62
476	39	"Ámbar vs. Corina, como leonas"	29 June 2018	1.44
477	40	"El Cabo en guerra con Diana"	2 July 2018	1.59
478	41	"Diana desafía a El Cabo"	3 July 2018	1.50
479	42	"El Cabo en la mira"	4 July 2018	1.21
480	43	"Ámbar negocia con la DEA"	5 July 2018	1.63
481	44	"El Cabo se desquita con Diana"	6 July 2018	1.52
482	45	"Van por Casillas y Águila Azul"	9 July 2018	1.70
483	46	"El Rojo se une a los Casillas"	10 July 2018	1.63
484	47	"Evelina atrae a Casillas"	11 July 2018	1.70
485	48	"El Cabo listo para su revancha"	12 July 2018	1.83
486	49	"Diana confiesa que es narco"	13 July 2018	1.55
487	50	"Casillas contra el presidente"	16 July 2018	1.74
488	51	"Casillas mata a Zuleta"	17 July 2018	1.73
489	52	"Duelo entre Casillas y El Cabo"	18 July 2018	1.98
490	53	"El Cabo balea a Casillas"	19 July 2018	1.82
491	54	"Casillas lucha por su vida"	20 July 2018	1.64
492	55	"Águila Azul revela su rostro"	23 July 2018	1.76
493	56	"Intensa búsqueda tras Casillas"	24 July 2018	1.71
494	57	"Van al refugio de Casillas"	25 July 2018	1.88
495	58	"Aurelio y Amado son hermanos"	26 July 2018	1.81
496	59	"El Cabo enfrenta a Águila Azul"	27 July 2018	1.76
497	60	"Secuestran a Diana Ahumada"	30 July 2018	1.93
498	61	"Evelina sospecha de El Cabo"	31 July 2018	1.85
499	62	"Misión para salvar a Casillas"	1 August 2018	1.97
500	63	"Diana golpea al secuestrador"	2 August 2018	1.84
501	64	"Águila Azul rescata a Diana"	3 August 2018	1.73
502	65	"A Diana le atrae Águila Azul"	6 August 2018	1.94
503	66	"El Cabo tirotea a El Chivo"	7 August 2018	1.88
504	67	"Atrapan a Javi"	8 August 2018	1.83
505	68	"Amado Casillas vs El Cabo"	9 August 2018	1.74
506	69	"Diana y El Cabo odio a muerte"	10 August 2018	1.63
507	70	"Terán acusa a Casillas"	13 August 2018	1.81
508	71	"Amado y Diana se besan"	14 August 2018	1.69
509	72	"Amado libera a Javi y al Rojo"	15 August 2018	1.72
510	73	"Sospechan de Ámbar"	16 August 2018	1.85
511	74	"Diana y Amado hacen el amor"	17 August 2018	1.53
512	75	"Amenazan con arrestar a Diana"	20 August 2018	1.77
513	76	"Diana abre su botín millonario"	21 August 2018	1.68
514	77	"Premio por Casillas y El Cabo"	22 August 2018	1.66
515	78	"Reaparece el hijo del Chema"	23 August 2018	1.65
516	79	"Amado embosca al Cabo"	24 August 2018	1.56
517	80	"El Rojo debe elegir"	27 August 2018	1.76
518	81	"El Chema va por su hijo"	28 August 2018	1.82
519	82	"Nuevo escondite para Aurelio"	29 August 2018	1.59
520	83	"El Chema somete a Corina"	30 August 2018	1.63
521	84	"Diana y Amado apasionados"	3 September 2018	1.71
522	85	"Aurelio reacciona del coma"	4 September 2018	1.65
523	86	"Amado con pistas del atentado"	5 September 2018	1.69
524	87	"El Cabo condiciona a Terán"	6 September 2018	1.72
525	88	"Amado evita ataque terrorista"	7 September 2018	1.51
526	89	"La Doña y Amado son aliados"	10 September 2018	1.86
527	90	"Diana muere de celos"	11 September 2018	1.67
528	91	"La Doña y Amado se besan"	12 September 2018	1.69
529	92	"El duelo de Amado y Ojeda"	13 September 2018	1.68
530	93	"El Chema, enamorado de Rutila"	14 September 2018	1.59
531	94	"Diana y Amado contraatacan"	17 September 2018	1.76
532	95	"La Doña pacta con los Casillas"	18 September 2018	1.80
533	96	"Molestos con Rutila"	19 September 2018	1.81
534	97	"El Cabo fuera vivo o muerto"	20 September 2018	1.78
535	98	"Castillo arresta a Terán"	21 September 2018	1.62
536	99	"Amado se entrega"	24 September 2018	2.06

=== Season 7 (2019–20) ===
No. overall	No. in season	Title	Original release date	US viewers (millions)
537	1	"Nace una leyenda"	14 October 2019	1.99
538	2	"Amor y guerra"	15 October 2019	1.67
539	3	"La liberación"	16 October 2019	1.55
540	4	"La sombra del pasado"	18 October 2019	1.52
541	5	"Negocios en Grecia"	21 October 2019	1.50
542	6	"El Cartel de los Balcanes"	22 October 2019	1.26
543	7	"Los Casillas de luto"	23 October 2019	1.30
544	8	"Nace el Cartel Casillas"	24 October 2019	1.59
545	9	"La noticia bomba"	25 October 2019	1.36
546	10	"Un tesoro en el fondo del mar"	28 October 2019	1.31
547	11	"Desacuerdo peligroso"	29 October 2019	1.23
548	12	"Los Casillas en alerta"	30 October 2019	1.24
549	13	"El Chema contra la DEA"	31 October 2019	1.28
550	14	"Un regalo mortífero"	1 November 2019	1.27
551	15	"Un mensaje de los Balcanes"	4 November 2019	1.20
552	16	"Ojo por ojo"	5 November 2019	1.22
553	17	"Hija de tigre pintita"	6 November 2019	1.30
554	18	"Los Casillas no perdonan"	7 November 2019	1.27
555	19	"La caricia de la serpiente"	8 November 2019	1.18
556	20	"Los Balcanes en México"	11 November 2019	1.24
557	21	"Peligrosa alianza"	12 November 2019	1.22
558	22	"Caen las máscaras"	13 November 2019	1.28
559	23	"El Chema vs. Amado"	14 November 2019	1.07
560	24	"Con el diablo no se juega"	15 November 2019	1.26
561	25	"El arte de la guerra"	18 November 2019	1.28
562	26	"La DEA detrás de El Chema"	19 November 2019	1.14
563	27	"Provocación directa"	20 November 2019	1.30
564	28	"Con el enemigo en la mira"	21 November 2019	1.34
565	29	"La venganza de Pío Valdivia"	22 November 2019	1.24
566	30	"Cara a cara"	25 November 2019	1.21
567	31	"La muerte acecha"	26 November 2019	1.28
568	32	"La furia de Diana"	27 November 2019	1.31
569	33	"El indetenible Pío"	2 December 2019	1.29
570	34	"Nuevas reglas del juego"	3 December 2019	1.23
571	35	"Empieza la cacería del Chema"	4 December 2019	1.14
572	36	"Venegas acorralado"	5 December 2019	1.28
573	37	"Unos ganan y otros pierden"	6 December 2019	1.17
574	38	"Una enemiga poderosa"	9 December 2019	1.26
575	39	"Rebelión en familia"	10 December 2019	1.07
576	40	"La revancha"	11 December 2019	1.00
577	41	"Una pista de La Coronela"	12 December 2019	1.03
578	42	"Una fuerte lección"	13 December 2019	0.99
579	43	"La ocasión perfecta"	16 December 2019	1.04
580	44	"Masacre en La Condesa"	17 December 2019	1.13
581	45	"Rey muerto, rey puesto"	18 December 2019	1.09
582	46	"Los siguientes en la lista"	19 December 2019	0.99
583	47	"Fiesta de narcos"	20 December 2019	0.94
584	48	"Muerte o cárcel"	23 December 2019	1.06
585	49	"Lucha contra el narco"	25 December 2019	0.82
586	50	"Los tiene bien puestos"	26 December 2019	0.98
587	51	"Con los Casillas nadie se mete"	27 December 2019	1.03
588	52	"Vivo o muerto"	30 December 2019	1.04
589	53	"La suerte de Evelina"	1 January 2020	0.96
590	54	"Terror y melancolía"	2 January 2020	1.12
591	55	"Los Casillas al asecho"	3 January 2020	1.01
592	56	"Amenazas y alianzas"	6 January 2020	1.00
593	57	"Demencia"	7 January 2020	1.06
594	58	"Víctima de abuso"	8 January 2020	1.08
595	59	"Dalila en la mira"	9 January 2020	1.04
596	60	"Prueba de fuego"	10 January 2020	0.97
597	61	"Plan estratégico"	13 January 2020	1.08
598	62	"Amor a prueba"	14 January 2020	1.08
599	63	"Junta de enemigos"	15 January 2020	1.16
600	64	"Tracción entre socios"	16 January 2020	1.14
601	65	"Lluvia de fuego"	17 January 2020	1.03
602	66	"Nadie perdona a nadie"	20 January 2020	1.18
603	67	"Contraataque mortal"	21 January 2020	1.14
604	68	"Sin piedad"	22 January 2020	1.20
605	69	"La dura verdad"	23 January 2020	1.16
606	70	"Las estrategia de los Casillas"	24 January 2020	1.11
607	71	"Al ataque"	27 January 2020	1.17
608	72	"Cinco minutos para salir"	28 January 2020	1.12
609	73	"Acorralado"	29 January 2020	1.25
610	74	"El dolor de los Casillas"	30 January 2020	1.24
611	75	"Ver la muerte"	31 January 2020	1.32

=== Season 8 (2023) ===
No. overall	No. in season	Title	Original release date	US viewers (millions)
612 613	1	"Resurrección"	17 January 2023 (Note: This episode originally aired as a single double-length episode.)	1.62
614	2	"Por compasión"	18 January 2023	1.62
615	3	"Debilidades"	19 January 2023	1.62
616	4	"El tiempo se agota"	20 January 2023	1.44
617	5	"Muerte en el funeral"	23 January 2023	1.38
618	6	"Tragedia familiar"	24 January 2023	1.64
619	7	"Desde la ultratumba"	25 January 2023	1.71
620	8	"Sobrenatural"	26 January 2023	1.75
621	9	"Código Lázaro"	27 January 2023	1.70
622	10	"La leyenda que camina"	30 January 2023	1.46
623	11	"Doble agente"	31 January 2023	1.42
624	12	"Caras vemos..."	1 February 2023	1.38
625	13	"La mejor defensa es el ataque"	2 February 2023	1.51
626	14	"Borrar el pasado"	3 February 2023	1.41
627	15	"Por la familia"	6 February 2023	1.36
628	16	"¿Mujer decente o traficante?"	8 February 2023	1.28
629	17	"No te equivoques"	9 February 2023	1.20
630	18	"Soy el señor de los cielos"	10 February 2023	1.28
631	19	"Sed de venganza"	13 February 2023	1.21
632	20	"Territorio ajeno"	14 February 2023	1.29
633	21	"Ni una bala más"	15 February 2023	1.35
634	22	"Deber de padre"	16 February 2023	1.23
635	23	"No le entro"	17 February 2023	1.30
636	24	"Todopoderoso"	20 February 2023	1.42
637	25	"Peligro inminente"	21 February 2023	1.30
638	26	"El rastro"	22 February 2023	1.23
639	27	"Amor en llamas"	23 February 2023	1.20
640	28	"Esto no es para mí"	24 February 2023	1.28
641	29	"Tú propones, yo dispongo"	27 February 2023	1.22
642	30	"La jugada perfecta"	28 February 2023	1.09
643	31	"Lo vas a pagar con sangre"	1 March 2023	1.20
644	32	"Soberana esencia"	2 March 2023	1.29
645	33	"Sexto sentido"	3 March 2023	1.11
646	34	"Dormir con el enemigo"	6 March 2023	1.16
647	35	"Por la boca muere el pez"	7 March 2023	1.11
648	36	"Viejas conocidas"	8 March 2023	1.15
649	37	"Consejos maternales"	9 March 2023	1.13
650	38	"La despedida"	10 March 2023	1.10
651	39	"Cubrir necesidades"	13 March 2023	1.09
652	40	"Cambio de planes"	14 March 2023	1.08
653	41	"Contra reloj"	15 March 2023	1.03
654	42	"No te vayas Corina"	16 March 2023	1.15
655	43	"Emergencia en el aire"	17 March 2023	0.93
656	44	"Aprender a volar"	20 March 2023	1.15
657	45	"Más que un deseo, una realidad"	21 March 2023	1.04
658	46	"Silencio a cualquier precio"	22 March 2023	1.15
659	47	"Amor sin fronteras"	23 March 2023	1.27
660	48	"El punto débil de Casillas"	24 March 2023	1.10
661	49	"Desconectados de la realidad"	27 March 2023	1.13
662	50	"Propuesta en el paraíso"	28 March 2023	1.04
663	51	"Esto es la vida real"	29 March 2023	1.01
664	52	"Instinto asesino"	30 March 2023	1.06
665	53	"Aurelio sale a cazar"	31 March 2023	1.09
666	54	"Todo apunta a Ismael"	3 April 2023	1.07
667	55	"Presión al más alto nivel"	4 April 2023	1.13
668	56	"Seré tu protector"	5 April 2023	1.21
669	57	"Ajuste de cuentas"	6 April 2023	1.14
670	58	"Infiltrado"	10 April 2023	1.20
671	59	"La venganza de Super Javi"	11 April 2023	0.98
672	60	"A mí no me engañas"	12 April 2023	1.09
673	61	"Doble cara"	13 April 2023	1.16
674	62	"Cabos sueltos"	14 April 2023	0.97
675	63	"Una nueva ilusión"	17 April 2023	1.04
676	64	"A mi manera"	18 April 2023	1.09
677	65	"Javi alborota el avispero"	19 April 2023	0.98
678	66	"Visita sorpresa en Miraflores"	20 April 2023	1.04
679	67	"Donde manda capitán..."	21 April 2023	0.93
680	68	"Urge el silencio"	24 April 2023	0.93
681	69	"Con el último aliento"	25 April 2023	1.06
682	70	"La elegida"	26 April 2023	1.03
683	71	"El Milagrito"	27 April 2023	1.05
684	72	"La sangre llama"	28 April 2023	1.03
685	73	"Sube y baja el telón"	1 May 2023	1.03
686	74	"Enemigo compartido"	2 May 2023	0.98
687	75	"Refuerzos para Tijuana"	3 May 2023	0.99
688	76	"Viviré en tus sueños"	4 May 2023	1.04
689	77	"Cómplices a la fuerza"	5 May 2023	1.04
690	78	"Nada es imposible"	8 May 2023	1.16
691	79	"Fuera de control"	9 May 2023	1.05
692	80	"La mejor carnada"	10 May 2023	0.98
693	81	"La trampa"	11 May 2023	1.05
694	82	"Ojos por todos lados"	12 May 2023	0.96
695	83	"La fiera que hay en ti"	15 May 2023	1.05
696	84	"Una mentira tras otra"	16 May 2023	1.13
697	85	"En bandeja de plata"	17 May 2023	1.14
698	86	"Interceptada"	18 May 2023	1.07
699	87	"El títere de Zambrana"	19 May 2023	0.93
700 701	88	"Batalla frontal"	22 May 2023	1.30

=== Season 9 (2024) ===
No. overall	No. in season	Title	Original release date	US viewers (millions)
702	1	"La Bestia despierta"	13 February 2024	1.29
703	2	"Aquí mando yo"	14 February 2024	1.04
704	3	"Eterno enemigo"	15 February 2024	1.05
705	4	"Ilusiones perdidas"	16 February 2024	1.07
706	5	"Geografía de una traición"	19 February 2024	1.14
707	6	"Padre no entierra hijos"	20 February 2024	1.02
708	7	"La ambición tiene cara de mujer"	21 February 2024	1.02
709	8	"Palabra de hombre"	22 February 2024	1.12
710	9	"Señor de los infiernos"	23 February 2024	1.03
711	10	"Después de una tempestad viene otra"	26 February 2024	1.12
712	11	"La guerra cambia de país"	27 February 2024	1.14
713	12	"Un mundo nuevo"	28 February 2024	1.10
714	13	"Alba Marina"	29 February 2024	1.04
715	14	"De alianzas y venganzas"	1 March 2024	1.14
716	15	"Una dulce enemiga"	4 March 2024	1.16
717	16	"El último latido"	5 March 2024	1.03
718	17	"El cuarto poder"	6 March 2024	0.96
719	18	"Aguas turbulentas"	8 March 2024	0.92
720	19	"Fuego por los cuatro costados"	11 March 2024	1.16
721	20	"Un secreto desesperado"	12 March 2024	1.06
722	21	"Ismael vuela alto"	13 March 2024	1.03
723	22	"Persecución implacable"	14 March 2024	1.14
724	23	"Unas de cal, otras de arena"	15 March 2024	1.05
725	24	"Por nuestros muertos"	18 March 2024	1.14
726	25	"El sacrificio"	19 March 2024	1.13
727	26	"Sangre con sangre se paga"	20 March 2024	1.07
728	27	"Desaparecida"	21 March 2024	1.05
729	28	"Caída y mesa limpia"	22 March 2024	0.99
730	29	"A la caza de La Felina"	25 March 2024	1.01
731	30	"Órdenes son órdenes"	26 March 2024	0.91
732	31	"Manzano busca salvar su pellejo"	27 March 2024	0.98
733	32	"Jugada por un presidenciable"	28 March 2024	1.09
734	33	"El segundo Milagrito"	29 March 2024	1.00
735	34	"Una alianza entre enemigos"	1 April 2024	0.92
736	35	"Huele raro"	2 April 2024	0.87
737	36	"Todo por Mecha"	3 April 2024	0.91
738	37	"La obsesión de Said"	4 April 2024	0.97
739	38	"Poderosas estrategias"	5 April 2024	0.85
740	39	"Con Dios y con el diablo"	8 April 2024	0.97
741	40	"Al descubierto"	9 April 2024	0.97
742	41	"Una propuesta inesperada"	10 April 2024	1.00
743	42	"Comparten el mismo hombre"	11 April 2024	1.06
744	43	"Said pierde la cabeza"	12 April 2024	0.98
745	44	"Al borde del suicidio"	15 April 2024	1.05
746	45	"Belén traza una línea"	16 April 2024	1.07
747	46	"Llegó tu hora"	17 April 2024	1.08
748	47	"Entre la vida y la muerte"	18 April 2024	1.04
749	48	"Este demonio es tu padre"	19 April 2024	1.06
750	49	"Un amor prohibido"	22 April 2024	1.06
751	50	"El beso más amargo"	23 April 2024	1.03
752	51	"Presa de sus acciones"	24 April 2024	1.02
753	52	"Belén se lleva la peor parte"	25 April 2024	1.12
754	53	"Cobardía y sacrificios"	26 April 2024	0.92
755	54	"Almenar negocia por su hija"	29 April 2024	1.02
756	55	"Con el Diablo no se juega"	30 April 2024	0.90
757	56	"La suerte está echada"	1 May 2024	1.04
758	57	"Moneda de cambio"	2 May 2024	1.04
759	58	"El cuarto poder se desinfla"	3 May 2024	1.01
760	59	"Ojos en todos lados"	6 May 2024	1.13
761	60	"La primera dama"	7 May 2024	1.04
762	61	"Música para sus oídos"	8 May 2024	0.93
763	62	"Hijo o rival"	9 May 2024	1.07
764	63	"El matasanos"	10 May 2024	1.00
765	64	"A cortar la culebra por la cabeza"	13 May 2024	1.16
766	65	"Códigos no escritos"	14 May 2024	1.08
767	66	"Golpe mediático"	16 May 2024	1.20
768	67	"Que tenga suerte, presidente"	17 May 2024	1.10
769	68	"Mecanismos de defensa"	20 May 2024	1.05
770	69	"La verdad, aunque duela"	21 May 2024	0.92
771	70	"La guerrera independiente"	22 May 2024	0.90
772	71	"La Felina enjaulada"	23 May 2024	0.84
773	72	"Un revés incalculable"	24 May 2024	0.90
774	73	"Olor a traición"	27 May 2024	0.88
775	74	"El arte de la intuición"	28 May 2024	1.04
776	75	"Cambio de imagen"	29 May 2024	0.87
777	76	"Callas o mueres"	30 May 2024	0.81
778	77	"Grietas profundas"	31 May 2024	0.76
779	78	"Desmanes de un trío"	3 June 2024	N/A
780	79	"Codo a codo conmigo"	4 June 2024	N/A
781	80	"Mecha mete la nariz en el negocio"	5 June 2024	N/A
782	81	"Secreto de Estado"	6 June 2024	N/A
783	82	"Cierre de cuentas"	7 June 2024	N/A
784	83	"En alerta"	10 June 2024	N/A
785	84	"Paradojas de la vida"	11 June 2024	N/A
786	85	"Sendero de venganza"	13 June 2024	N/A
787	86	"Entre la sangre y la traición"	14 June 2024	N/A
788	87	"Giros del destino"	17 June 2024	N/A
789	88	"Un asunto de negocios"	18 June 2024	N/A
790	89	"Al acecho"	19 June 2024	N/A
791	90	"Golpe inminente"	20 June 2024	N/A
792	91	"El arma secreta de Belén"	21 June 2024	N/A
793	92	"Mortíferas consecuencias"	24 June 2024	N/A
794	93	"Cortina de humo"	25 June 2024	N/A
795 796	94	"Duelo de reyes"	26 June 2024	N/A

=== Season 10 (2026) ===
No. overall	No. in season	Title	Original release date
797	1	"Operación Michoacán"	7 July 2026
798	2	"Vida y muerte"	8 July 2026
799	3	"La culpa"	9 July 2026
800	4	"Notorius"	10 July 2026
801	5	"Desconfianza"	13 July 2026
802	6	"El target: Cifuentes"	14 July 2026
803	7	"Punto de quiebre"	15 July 2026
804	8	"Entre aliados y enemigos"	16 July 2026
805	9	"Cada victoria tiene un precio"	17 July 2026
806	10	"Choque entre mujeres"	20 July 2026
807	11	"La sangre no miente"	21 July 2026
808	12	"El rastro enemigo"	22 July 2026
809	13	"El reino de las esmeraldas"	23 July 2026
810	14	"Plan de inversión"	24 July 2026
811	15	"La revelación de Aurelio"	27 July 2026
812	16	"Nuevo rastro"	28 July 2026
813	17	"El enemigo está cerca"	29 July 2026
814	18	"Golpe al narco"	30 July 2026
815	19	"Batalla por la venganza"	31 July 2026
816	20	"La crisis los divide"	3 August 2026
817	21	"Las últimas palabras"	4 August 2026
818	22	"El deseo de Aurelio"	5 August 2026
819	23	"Pasión desbordada"	6 August 2026
820	24	"El poder de las alianzas"	7 August 2026
821	25	"Celos y sospechas"	10 August 2026
822	26	"Una jugada maestra"	11 August 2026
823	27	"Una vieja deuda"	12 August 2026
824	28	"Territorio en guerra"	13 August 2026
825	29	"Ajuste de cuentas"	14 August 2026
826	30	"La conquista del banco"	17 August 2026
827	31	"Conexión y conspiración"	18 August 2026
828	32	"Isidro en el radar"	19 August 2026
829	33	"La amenaza llega con Castillo"	20 August 2026
830	34	"Señuelo"	21 August 2026
831	35	"Operación millonaria"	24 August 2026
832	36	"El manifiesto"	25 August 2026
833	37	"La trampa perfecta"	26 August 2026
834	38	"En la mira"	27 August 2026
835	39	"La estocada"	28 August 2026
836	40	"Entre mujeres y el poder"	31 August 2026
837	41	"Los fantasmas del pasado"	1 September 2026
838	42	"Hombre clave"	2 September 2026
839	43	"Tiempo de venganza"	3 September 2026
840	44	"El secreto de Lucy"	4 September 2026
841	45	"Ultimátum"	7 September 2026
842	46	"A un paso del peligro"	8 September 2026
843	47	"El expediente"	10 September 2026
844	48	"El tablero cambia"	11 September 2026
845	49	"Pulso por la frontera"	14 September 2026
846	50	"Todo o nada"	15 September 2026
847	51	"El juego comienza"	16 September 2026
848	52	"Dueños de Nueva York"	17 September 2026
849	53	"Bajo nuevas reglas"	18 September 2026
850	54	"La gran conquista"	21 September 2026
851	55	"Una decisión difícil"	22 September 2026
852	56	"Negocio sin frontera"	23 September 2026
853	57	"Mala jugada"	24 September 2026
854	58	"La encrucijada"	25 September 2026
855	59	"Desplante presidencial"	28 September 2026
856	60	"El imperio secreto"	29 September 2026
857	61	"A un paso de la muerte"	30 September 2026
858	62	"El control del banco"	1 October 2026
859	63	"El precio de negarse"	2 October 2026
860	64	"La seguridad del cielo"	5 October 2026
861	65	"Cacería implacable"	6 October 2026
862	66	"Sin escapatoria"	7 October 2026
863	67	"El precio de la traición"	8 October 2026
864	68	"A sangre fría"	9 October 2026
865	69	"¿Socios?"	12 October 2026
866	70	"En jaque"	13 October 2026
867	71	"Nada será igual"	14 October 2026
868	72	"Sín limites"	15 October 2026
869	73	"El aviso de Sakuani"	16 October 2026
870	74	"Un paso sin retorno"	19 October 2026
871	75	"Atrapada entre dos frentes"	20 October 2026
872	76	"La ley del poder"	21 October 2026
873	77	"La voluntad del rey"	23 October 2026
874	78	"Cuenta pendiente"	26 October 2026
875	79	"Recompensa millonaria"	27 October 2026
876	80	"Un rival inesperado"	28 October 2026
877	81	"Sin vuelta atrás"	29 October 2026
878	82	"La emboscada perfecta"	30 October 2026
879	83	"El negocio evoluciona"	2 November 2026
880	84	"Pacto, ambición y traición"	4 November 2026
881	85	"Alerta entre los Casillas"	5 November 2026
882	86	"Un invitado indeseado"	6 November 2026
883	87	"Operación Acción Rayo"	9 November 2026
884	88	"La caída se aproxima"	10 November 2026
885	89	"Estrategia"	11 November 2026
886 887	90	"El final de una leyenda"	12 November 2026

== Special ==
=== Special 2017 ===
Season	No. in season	Title	Original release date	US viewers (millions)
5	101	"Recapitulación"	June 20, 2017	1.39
A review of the main events that marked the history of Aurelio Casillas in the last four seasons.

=== Other specials ===
No. overall	No. in season	Title	Original release date
1	1	"Los 20 Momentos de El Señor de los Cielos"	July 5, 2013
2	2	"El Cara a Cara de El Señor de los Cielos"	August 6, 2013
3	3	"El Señor de los Cielos, el capítulo secreto"	May 23, 2014
4	4	"En la sombra del narco"	May 26, 2014
