= La Doña season 2 =

2020 American television season

La Doña
- Season 2
- Starring: Aracely Arámbula; Carlos Ponce; David Zepeda
- No. of episodes: 75

Release
- Original network: Telemundo
- Original release: 13 January – 27 April 2020

The second and final season of the American television series La Doña was confirmed by Telemundo in May 2019. The season is starring an ensemble cast headed by Aracely Arambula, Carlos Ponce, and David Zepeda.

== Cast ==
=== Main ===
- Aracely Arámbula as Altagracia Sandoval "La Doña"
- Carlos Ponce as León Contreras
- David Zepeda as José Luis Navarrete
- Maricela González as Eunice Lara "La Felina" (character from El Señor de los Cielos)
- Kika Edgar as Romelia Vega
- Patricia Reyes Spíndola as Florencia Molina
- Alejandra Barros as Eleonora Rojas de Navarrete
- Paola Fernández as Noelia Molina
- José Sefami as Alfonso Cabral
- Andrea Martí as Regina Sandoval
- José María Galeano as Braulio Padilla / Ernesto Palmar
- Fernanda Borches as Fátima Escamilla
- Leo Deluglio as Diego Padilla
- Diego Soldano as Daniel Llamas
- Simone Victoria as Magdalena Sánchez
- Claudio Roca as Adolfo Mendoza
- Mayra Sierra as Karen Velarde
- Alexa Martín as Fernanda Céspedes
- Alberto Casanova as Mauricio Preciado
- Paola Albo as Isabela Sandoval
- Bernardo Flores as Lucho Navarrete
- Agustín Argüello as Eduardo Pérez
- Aquiles Cervantes as Matamoros
- Diego Escalona as Ángel Contreras
- Cuauhtli Jiménez as Fernando "Nando" Valles
- Rafael Ernesto as Sebastián Céspedes
- Juan Pablo De Santiago
- Christian Ramos as Cisco
- Leandro Lima as Thiago
- Eric del Castillo as Ricardo Vidal

=== Recurring and guest ===
- Danna Paola as Mónica Eulalia Hernandez
- Francisco Rubio as Andrés Roldán
- Luis Xavier as Don Manuel Padilla
- Matías Novoa as Amado Casillas "El Águila Azul" (character from El Señor de los Cielos)

== Production ==
On 14 May 2018, Aracely Arámbula announced through her Instagram account that La Doña had been renewed for a second season. It was not until a year later, on 9 May 2019 that Telemundo made the announcement official. On 22 August 2019, People en Español magazine confirmed the entire cast that would be in the second season. It was also confirmed that David Chocarro would no longer be part of the cast, and that Danna Paola would only have a guest role due to her commitment to the Élite series. The actors who did retake their character from the previous season are José María Galeano, Andrea Martí, Diego Soldano, Leo Deluglio, Simone Victoria, Mayra Sierra, and Aquiles Cervantes.

== Reception ==
The season premiered on 13 January 2020 with a total of 1 million viewers, and 470 thousand adults between 18–49 years, according to Nielsen Data released by PRODU. Despite this, the season failed to beat the Turkish series Kara Sevda of Univision, and during its first week on air, it failed to reach one million viewers.

== Episodes ==
No. overall	No. in season	Title	Original release date	US viewers (millions)
121	1	"El regreso"	13 January 2020	1.03
After two years away from everyone Altagracia resides in Rio de Janeiro with her new boyfriend Thiago doing illegal business. On the other hand, in Mexico a new band of criminals called Los Arcoíris kidnap women, abuse them and then kill them. But not only that, there are also new enemies for Altagracia, all the relatives of the men she killed want revenge. Meanwhile Mónica and Regina are victims of an attack, and Saúl disappears. What makes Altagracia decide to return to Mexico, to protect her family. But upon arrival she learns that Saúl was killed and she is arrested by León Contreras.
122	2	"Detrás de la venganza"	14 January 2020	0.94
After the arrest of Altagracia, all her enemies find out that she is alive and will try to kill her. On the other hand Alfonso Cabral lets Romelia know that Altagracia's lawyer, Braulio Padilla is alive. Meanwhile, Mónica tries to discover who murdered Saúl and that is how she meets Noelia, an informant who helped Saúl with the case of Los Arcoíris.
123	3	"En la mira de Arcoíris"	15 January 2020	0.87
When Navarrete's plans to try to assassinate Altagracia go wrong. Braulio along with the relatives of Los Monkeys try to assassinate Altagracia, but his plans go wrong because León manages to save Altagracia. For his part, Eduardo tries to discover who is the hacker who has been leaking information about him, and with the help of Lucho, José Luis's son tries to end Noelia, but the plan to end Noelia goes wrong, and the police discover where lives the informant who helped Saúl in the case of Los Arcoirís. After the attack on Noelia, Mónica is kidnapped.
124	4	"Dinero sucio"	16 January 2020	0.89
León tells Altagracia that Mónica was kidnapped. Altagracia is reunited with José Luis to ask him to return her daughter, but he tells her he doesn't have Mónica. Meanwhile, León tries to gather information to know about Mónica's whereabouts and Altagracia asks Regina to find a briefcase with money stolen of José Luis. Noelia looks for León to ask for protection for her and her mother. On the other hand, Braulio and the family members of Los Monkeys reveal that they have kidnapped Mónica.
125	5	"Arranca el juicio a Altagracia"	17 January 2020	0.87
Altagracia asks José Luis to reach an agreement to recover Mónica. León helps Noelia and her mother to stay living in the Renacer Foundation, while Lucho and his partners discover who is the woman who is threatening them. Noelia begins to suspect that one of the employees of the construction company Navarrete, is one of the men who attacked her and her mother. On the other hand, the trial against Altagracia begins and the family members of the Monkeys testify against it.
126	6	"Manipulaciones"	20 January 2020	1.02
León accuses Altagracia in the trial of disappearing the evidence that incriminates her. Karen discovers that Nando is the man who tried to attack Noelina and her mother. For his part Nando tries to attack Noelia again, but is discovered and arrested. In the Altagracia trial, he states that Rafael Cabral tried to abuse her again.
127	7	"Nuevos socios"	21 January 2020	0.93
The trial fails in favor of Altagracia. José Luis and Altagracia pay off a portion of their debt. For his part, Altagracia calls Amado Casillas to ask for help and he tells her to meet La Felina. Nando's accomplices disappear all his technology equipment from his home and Karen is late to take the evidence. León accepts that Noelia and her mother stay at home for a while and Judge Ricardo is bribed to get Nando out of jail. Meanwhile, Noelia is kidnapped by a group of unknown men.
128	8	"Divide y vencerás"	22 January 2020	0.94
129	9	"La pista"	23 January 2020	1.04
130	10	"Todo por Mónica"	24 January 2020	0.97
131	11	"Encrucijada"	27 January 2020	1.08
132	12	"La guerra de Altagracia"	28 January 2020	0.99
133	13	"El despojo"	29 January 2020	1.07
134	14	"Toca fondo"	30 January 2020	1.06
135	15	"Revuelo en el funeral"	31 January 2020	1.00
136–137	16	"Truculentos deseos"	3 February 2020 (Note: This episode lasts for two hours, according to Telemundo, it is only counted as one episode and not as two episodes.)	1.00
138–139	17	"El plan b"	5 February 2020	0.94
140–141	18	"El traslado"	6 February 2020	0.88
142–143	19	"El olfato de León"	7 February 2020	0.73
144	20	"De la misma sangre"	10 February 2020	0.96
145	21	"Adorable mensajera"	11 February 2020	1.01
146	22	"Enemigo a la vista"	12 February 2020	0.93
147	23	"Atrapado en el infierno"	13 February 2020	0.94
148	24	"Embestida"	14 February 2020	0.75
149	25	"Psicópata a prueba"	17 February 2020	0.93
150	26	"Pasión desenfrenada"	18 February 2020	0.91
151	27	"Un loco suelto"	19 February 2020	0.89
152	28	"La gran batalla"	20 February 2020	1.01
153	29	"Formar a un Arcoíris"	21 February 2020	0.91
154	30	"Fiel hasta la muerte"	24 February 2020	0.98
155	31	"Ansias de matar"	25 February 2020	1.04
156	32	"La presa o la evidencia"	26 February 2020	0.88
157	33	"Ni un dedo encima"	27 February 2020	1.03
158	34	"El rompecabeza"	28 February 2020	1.03
159	35	"El error de la Doña"	2 March 2020	1.04
160	36	"Acorralado"	3 March 2020	1.02
161	37	"León va con todo"	4 March 2020	1.02
162	38	"La loca verdad"	5 March 2020	0.88
163	39	"Efecto dominó"	6 March 2020	1.00
164	40	"La sombra del pasado"	9 March 2020	1.04
165	41	"La Doña no perdona"	10 March 2020	1.05
166	42	"Unidos por el dolor"	11 March 2020	1.05
167	43	"Pierde la cabeza por amor"	12 March 2020	1.01
168	44	"Corazón de León"	13 March 2020	0.95
169	45	"Una zorra con clase"	16 March 2020	1.04
170	46	"Muertos que hablan"	17 March 2020	1.12
171	47	"La gran interrogante"	18 March 2020	1.04
172	48	"El plan de León se derrumba"	19 March 2020	1.10
173	49	"Un mal día para Navarrete"	20 March 2020	1.00
174	50	"Lo pasado pisado"	23 March 2020	1.25
175	51	"Cero fantasías"	24 March 2020	1.13
176	52	"La Doña fuera del juego"	25 March 2020	1.20
177	53	"Huele mal"	26 March 2020	1.13
178	54	"Miedo a perder"	27 March 2020	1.09
179	55	"Bochorno"	30 March 2020	1.05
180	56	"Una Felina que tiembla"	31 March 2020	1.08
181	57	"En fila para matar"	1 April 2020	1.02
182	58	"No aclare, que oscurece"	2 April 2020	1.10
183	59	"Un clavo saca otro clavo"	3 April 2020	0.95
184	60	"Por las buenas o por las malas"	6 April 2020	1.04
185	61	"Altagracia nunca rinde cuentas"	7 April 2020	0.9
186	62	"El enemigo en tu cama"	8 April 2020	1.10
187	63	"Un paso en falso"	9 April 2020	0.95
188	64	"Golpe al ego de Altagracia"	10 April 2020	0.96
189	65	"El precio de la venganza"	13 April 2020	1.02
190	66	"El zarpazo mortal"	14 April 2020	1.07
191	67	"Seducción infalible"	15 April 2020	0.99
192	68	"Mentes perversas"	16 April 2020	1.03
193	69	"La cacería"	17 April 2020	1.05
194	70	"La confesión"	20 April 2020	1.03
195	71	"No toquen a Regina"	21 April 2020	0.97
196	72	"El rescate"	22 April 2020	1.18
197	73	"El que las hace, las paga"	23 April 2020	1.13
198	74	"De la misma medicina"	24 April 2020	1.05
199	75	"El intercambio"	27 April 2020	1.19
