= El Sexo Débil =

- Created by: Joaquin Guerrero-Casasola
- Developed by: Argos Television; Sony Pictures Television
- Directed by: Moises Ortiz Urquidi
- Starring: Itatí Cantoral; Mauricio Ochmann; Khotan Fernández; Raúl Méndez
- Theme music composer: Malashunta; Camilo Froideval; Raul Vizzi
- Opening theme: "El Sexo Debil" opening theme
- Ending theme: "Keep My Heart" by Deep Sounds
- Country of origin: Mexico
- Original language: Spanish
- No. of episodes: 120

Production
- Executive producers: Ana Graciela Ugalde; Daniel Camhi
- Producers: Carlos Payan; Epigmenio Ibarra; Ana Celia Urquidi
- Editor: Horacio Valle
- Camera setup: Multi-camera
- Running time: 60 minutes

Original release
- Network: Cadena Tres
- Release: February 7 – July 24, 2011

El Sexo Débil is a Mexican Spanish language telenovela produced by Argos Television for Cadena Tres and Sony Pictures Television for Cadena Tres. It stars Itatí Cantoral, Mauricio Ochmann, Khotan Fernández, Raúl Méndez, Pablo Cruz and Arturo Ríos. The series-made-telenovela was aired on February 7, 2011.

As of November 24, 2014 Canal 7 started broadcasting El Sexo Débil weekdays at 2:30pm replacing Sangre Que Traiciona. The last episode was broadcast on February 13, 2015 with Las Trampas del Deseo replacing it on February 16, 2015.

== Cast ==
- Itatí Cantoral Helena Román
- Mauricio Ochmann Julián Camacho
- Khotan Fernández Alvaro Camacho
- Pablo Cruz Bruno Camacho
- Raúl Méndez
- Marco Trevino
- Adriana Parra
- Rodrigo Oviedo
- Luciana Silveyra
- Bianca Calderon
- Adrián Alonso
- Julia Urbini
- Arturo Ríos
