= Raúl Méndez =

Mexican actor (born 1975)

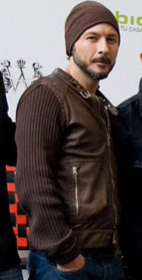
- Born: Raúl Méndez Martínez; 11 April 1975 (age 51); Laguna, Torreón, Mexico
- Occupation: Actor
- Years active: 1998–present
- Television: El sexo débil El Señor de los Cielos

Raúl Méndez Martínez (born 11 April 1975 in Laguna, Torreón, Mexico) is a Mexican actor of film, theater and television.

== Biography ==
He studied acting at the Center for Arts Education Monterrey and La Casa del Teatro with Luis de Tavira between 1994 and 1999. He has worked in numerous theatrical productions. He is one of the most chameleonic actors in Mexico. In 2005, he was nominated for his work on Ariel Matando Cabos. Personifies from a murderer in The Legend of Zorro, as an executive assistant in a wonderful world. KM participated in the tape 31 has been of the highest grossing Mexico, nominated for three Ariels. He also participated in Showtime chain FIDEL off Gael García and Víctor Huggo Martin. He portrayed Colombian former president Cesar Gaviria in Narcos.

== Filmography ==
=== Film roles ===
Year	Title	Roles	Notes
2001	Demasiado amor	Sergio	
2002	El tigre de Santa Julia	Miranda	
2003	Midas	Paco	Short film
2004	Matando Cabos	Botcha	
2005	The Legend of Zorro	Ferroq	
2006	Un mundo maravilloso	Image Advisor	
2006	Morirse en domingo	Eleuterio	
2006	Kilometer 31	Omar	
2007	La sangre iluminada	Roberto	
2007	La siguiente victima	Stalker	Short film
2007	Karma	Daniel	Short film
2007	El último justo	Agent Ramírez	
2007	Sultanes del Sur	Voyeur in the robbery	
2008	El viaje de Teo	Alejandro	
2008	Paraíso perdido	Darío	Short film
2009	Amar a morir	Tiburón	
2009	2033	Goros	
2009	The Kid: Chamaco	Officer Manuel Quintana	
2010	Sucedió en un día	Raúl	Segment: "Langosta"
2010	Hidalgo: La historia jamás contada	Ignacio Allende	
2011	Tequila	Luis	
2012	Mariachi Gringo	Jorge	
2012	Ventanas al mar	Mauricio	
2012	Cristiada	Miguel Gómez Loza	
2012	Colosio: El asesinato	Samuel Palma	
2012	Morelos	Mariano Matamoros	
2012	Renacimiento	Papá	Short film
2012	Reencarnación: Una historia de amor	Lisandro	
2012	La mala luz	Eric	
2013	No sé si cortarme las venas o dejármelas largas	Aarón	
2013	Actores S.A.	Tomás	
2013	5 Bravo	Agustín	
2014	Dame tus ojos	Alejandro	
2014	Fachon Models	César Reynoso	
2014	The Incident	Marco	
2014	Visitantes	Daniel	
2015	Las Aparicio	Rodrigo	
2017	La lengua del sol	Ramiro	Uncredited

=== Television roles ===
Year	Title	Roles	Notes
1998	Amor infiel	Rodrigo	
2000	Die Geiseln von Costa Rica	Talamanca	Television film
2001	El guardián de Red Rock	Lefty	Television film
2001	In the Time of the Butterflies	Pedrito	Television film
2002	Fidel	Rodríguez	Television film
2002	Feliz navidad mamá	Samuel	
2007	Como ama una mujer	Diego	Series regular; 5 episodes
2010	Las Aparicio	Manuel	
2011	El sexo débil	Dante Camacho	Main role; 114 episodes
2012	Lynch	George González	Recurring role (season 1); 4 episodes
2012	Paramédicos	Damián Molina	Series regular (season 1); 13 episodes
2013–2014	El Señor de los Cielos	Víctor Casillas "Chacorta"	Main role (seasons 1–2); 158 episodes
2015	Texas Rising	Juan Seguin	Series regular (season 1); 5 episodes
2015–2017	Sense8	Joaquín Flores	Recurring role (seasons 1–2); 6 episodes
2015–2016	Narcos	César Gaviria	Recurring role (seasons 1–2); 17 episodes
2016	La viuda negra	El Diablo	Main role (season 2)
2017	La fiscal de hierro	Ernesto Padilla	Main role; 65 episodes
2017	Cocaine Godmother	Darío Sepúlveda	Television film
2018	Miguel	Martín	Episode: "Episode 1"
2018–2020	Enemigo íntimo	Alejandro Ferrer	Main role (season 1); 53 episodes
2025–2026	Dinastía Casillas	Víctor "Chacorta" Casillas	

== Awards and nominations ==
Year	Nominated work	Award	Result
2004	Matando Cabos	Ariel Award for Best Male Here	Nominated
2013	El Señor de los Cielos	2013 Premios Tu Mundo for Best Supporting Cast	Nominated
2014	El Señor de los Cielos 2	2014 Premios Tu Mundo for Best Supporting Cast	Nominated
