= Dinastía Casillas =

- Genre: Drama
- Created by: Juan Camilo Ferrand
- Written by: Juan Camilo Ferrand; Carmina Narro; Iris Dubs; Juan Manuel Andrade; Luis Colmenares
- Directed by: Javier Patrón Fox; Mauricio Corredor; Laura Marco Lavilla; Jorge Ríos Villanueva
- Starring: Iván Arana; Raúl Méndez; María Fernanda Yepes; Isabella Castillo; Ianis Guerrero; Robinson Díaz; Plutarco Haza; Roberto Sosa
- Theme music composer: Erik Álvarez
- Composers: Erik Álvarez; Juan Andrés Cammarano
- Country of origin: United States
- Original language: Spanish
- No. of seasons: 1
- No. of episodes: 92

Production
- Executive producer: Mónica Francesca Vizzi
- Producer: Mabel Vargas
- Cinematography: Juan Carlos Lazo; Ricardo Garfias; Alejandro Téllez
- Editor: Ramiro Pardo
- Production company: Telemundo Studios

Original release
- Network: Telemundo
- Release: 7 October 2025 – 16 February 2026

Related
- El Señor de los Cielos

Dinastía Casillas is an American television series created by Juan Camilo Ferrand. The series is a follow-up and spinoff to El Señor de los Cielos, which originally ran from 2013 to 2024. It stars Iván Arana, Raúl Méndez, María Fernanda Yepes and Isabella Castillo. The series aired on Telemundo from 7 October 2025 to 16 February 2026.

== Cast ==
- Iván Arana as Ismael Casillas
- Raúl Méndez as Víctor Casillas "Chacorta"
- María Fernanda Yepes as Elizabeth Cordero
- Isabella Castillo as Diana Ahumada
- Ianis Guerrero as Fabricio Hernández "El Gancho"
- Robinson Díaz as Milton Jiménez "El Cabo"
- Plutarco Haza as Dalvio Navarrete "El Ingeniero"
- Roberto Sosa as General Santiago Cifuentes
- Karen Sandoval as Laura Salgado
- Alejandro Aguilar as Agustín Marin "El Parcero"
- Ximena González Rubio as Lucía Fernanda Estrada
- David Palacio as Horacio Altamirano
- Wendy de los Cobos as Aguasanta "Tata" Guerra
- Leonardo Álvarez as Leonardo Venegas
- Alan Slim as Jaime Ernesto Rosales
- Carlos Corona as Rigoberto Alfaro
- David Ponce as José Manrique "Skinny"
- Alejandro Navarrete as El Zopilote
- Ana González Bello as Eréndira Pabón
- Gonzalo Vega Jr. as Francisco Moreno
- Luciana Silveyra as President Carmela
- Christian Gnecco as El Jaguar
- Sandra Quiroz as Tatiana
- Vanessa Acosta as Dana Mariscal
- Adrián Ladrón as Tiberio
- Ana Sofía Gatica as Ligia Kurk
- Alexis Jauregui as Isidro Casillas
- Florencia Ríos as Roberta Dorantes
- María Antonieta Hidalgo as Ofelia Ramírez
- Ivanna Castro as Isabela Morales
- Jesusa Ochoa as Ángela
- Carlo Basabe as Carlos Casillas
- Ana Celeste as Mariela Hernandez Estrada "La Mamba"

== Production ==
=== Development ===
On 24 April 2024, Rafael Amaya announced that he would exit El Señor de los Cielos following the ninth season. Weeks later, Telemundo ordered a spin-off sequel titled La dinastía Casillas, centering on Rutila and Ismael Casillas. Filming of the series began on 24 June 2025.

=== Casting ===
On 9 May 2024, Carmen Aub and Iván Arana were announced in the lead roles. However, Aub exited the production as she wanted to move on with her career and pursue other projects. In December 2024, Isabella Castillo confirmed she would reprise her role of Diana in the spin-off. In May 2025, María Fernanda Yepes was cast in a main role. The complete cast was announced on 25 June 2025.

== Episodes ==
No.	Title	Original air date	U.S. viewers (millions)
1	"Déjà vu"	7 October 2025	1.32
2	"Escape"	8 October 2025	N/A
3	"Costa Rica"	9 October 2025	1.00
4	"Encuentro"	10 October 2025	0.95
5	"Colombia"	13 October 2025	0.94
6	"Combate"	14 October 2025	1.10
7	"Alianza"	15 October 2025	1.09
8	"Reencuentro"	16 October 2025	0.98
9	"Regreso"	17 October 2025	0.94
10	"Venganza"	20 October 2025	1.08
11	"Dron"	21 October 2025	1.16
12	"Feria"	22 October 2025	1.17
13	"Revelación"	24 October 2025	1.17
14	"#Elilover"	27 October 2025	1.04
15	"Pasión"	28 October 2025	0.99
16	"Culiacán"	29 October 2025	1.02
17	"Recompensa"	30 October 2025	0.98
18	"Mariachi"	31 October 2025	0.79
19	"Consulta"	3 November 2025	0.79
20	"Eréndira"	4 November 2025	1.02
21	"Consecuencias"	5 November 2025	0.92
22	"Entrevista"	6 November 2025	1.13
23	"Operativo"	7 November 2025	0.85
24	"Ataque"	10 November 2025	0.97
25	"Heridas"	11 November 2025	0.99
26	"Hotel"	12 November 2025	1.10
27	"Jaime"	13 November 2025	0.98
28	"Acertijo"	14 November 2025	0.90
29	"Sorpresa"	17 November 2025	0.97
30	"Purgatorio"	18 November 2025	N/A
31	"Suicidio"	19 November 2025	0.97
32	"Noticias"	21 November 2025	1.03
33	"Visita"	24 November 2025	N/A
34	"Secuestro"	25 November 2025	N/A
35	"Apariencias"	26 November 2025	N/A
36	"Negociación"	28 November 2025	N/A
37	"Moneda de cambio"	1 December 2025	N/A
38	"Óscar"	2 December 2025	N/A
39	"Intercambio"	3 December 2025	N/A
40	"Adiós"	4 December 2025	N/A
41	"Medellín"	5 December 2025	N/A
42	"Impostor"	8 December 2025	N/A
43	"Acción y reacción"	9 December 2025	N/A
44	"Verdad"	10 December 2025	N/A
45	"Elección peligrosa"	12 December 2025	N/A
46	"Errores imperdonables"	15 December 2025	N/A
47	"Capo resucitado"	16 December 2025	N/A
48	"AB Negativo"	17 December 2025	N/A
49	"Recuperación"	18 December 2025	N/A
50	"Alianza internacional"	19 December 2025	N/A
51	"Luto"	22 December 2025	N/A
52	"Rehabilitación"	23 December 2025	N/A
53	"Exposición"	25 December 2025	N/A
54	"Información por recompensa"	26 December 2025	N/A
55	"Alfaro"	29 December 2025	N/A
56	"LIVE"	30 December 2025	N/A
57	"Decepción"	1 January 2026	N/A
58	"¿Terapeuta?"	2 January 2026	N/A
59	"Rescate"	5 January 2026	N/A
60	"Diana"	6 January 2026	N/A
61	"Botín de guerra"	7 January 2026	N/A
62	"Gata"	8 January 2026	N/A
63	"Gringa"	9 January 2026	N/A
64	"Dulcinea"	12 January 2026	N/A
65	"Mensajes"	13 January 2026	N/A
66	"Isabela"	14 January 2026	N/A
67	"Luz"	15 January 2026	N/A
68	"Hallazgo siniestro"	16 January 2026	N/A
69	"Mártir"	19 January 2026	N/A
70	"Cerebral"	20 January 2026	N/A
71	"¿Vivo?"	21 January 2026	N/A
72	"Feminicidio"	22 January 2026	N/A
73	"Coleccionista"	23 January 2026	N/A
74	"Costilla"	26 January 2026	N/A
75	"Enfermo"	27 January 2026	N/A
76	"Cuartel"	28 January 2026	N/A
77	"Cabaña"	29 January 2026	N/A
78	"Mamá"	30 January 2026	N/A
79	"Ubicación"	2 February 2026	N/A
80	"Jaguar"	3 February 2026	N/A
81	"Garra"	4 February 2026	N/A
82	"Abordaje"	5 February 2026	N/A
83	"Santita"	6 February 2026	N/A
84	"Tregua"	9 February 2026	N/A
85	"¿Jefe?"	10 February 2026	N/A
86	"Traición"	11 February 2026	N/A
87	"Testigo"	12 February 2026	N/A
88	"Testigo"	12 February 2026	N/A
89	"Error"	13 February 2026	N/A
90	"Error"	13 February 2026	N/A
91	"Esperanza"	16 February 2026	1.64
92	"Esperanza"	16 February 2026	1.64
