= Aleida Núñez =

Mexican actress, singer and model (born 1981)

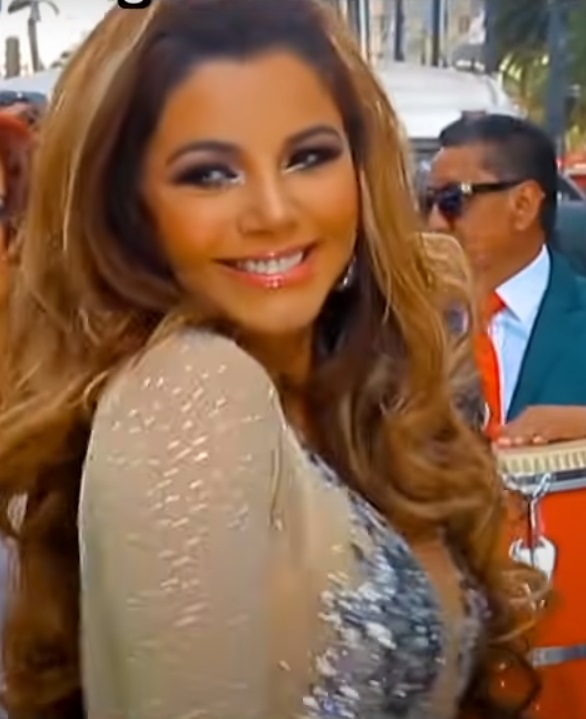
- Born: Aleida Araceli Núñez Flores; Lagos de Moreno, Jalisco, Mexico
- Education: Universidad del Bajio, León
- Occupations: Actress; singer; model
- Years active: 2002–present
- Height: 165 cm (5 ft 5 in)
- Spouse: Pablo Glogovsky (2009-2017)
- Children: Alexander (b. 2013)
- Relatives: Marcela Núñez (sister)

Aleida Araceli Núñez Flores or Aleida Núñez (Spanish pronunciation: [aˈlejða ˈnuɲes]) is a Mexican actress, singer, and model.

== Filmography ==
=== Telenovelas ===
Year	Title	Role	Notes
2002	Entre el amor y el odio	India	Supporting Role
2002-03	Las vías del amor	Lucy	Supporting Role
2003-04	Mariana de la noche	Miguelina de Páramo	Supporting Role
2005	Contra viento y marea	Perla "Perlita"	Supporting Role
2006-07	La fea más bella	Yazmín García	Supporting Role
2007	Destilando amor	Hostess	Special Appearance
2008-09	Mañana es para siempre	Gardenia Campillo	Supporting Role
2010-11	Cuando me enamoro	Alfonsina Campos Flores de Fierro	Supporting Role
2012	Un Refugio para el Amor	Violeta Ramos/Violeta Trueba Ramos/Coral	Supporting Role
2014-15	Hasta el fin del mundo	Irma Fernández	Supporting Role
2017	El bienamado	Gloriana	Supporting Role
2018	Por amar sin ley	Milena Téllez	Guest Role
2020	La mexicana y el güero	Rosenda	Supporting Role
2022	Corazón guerrero	Selena Recuero	Supporting Role
2024-26	El Señor de los Cielos	Josefina Nieto / Nina "La Monarca"	Supporting Role (seasons 9-10)

=== Series ===
Year	Title	Role	Notes
2008	Mujeres asesinas	Doris	Episode: Cándida, esperanzada
2010	Mujeres asesinas	Mercedes González	Protagonist; Episode: Elvira y Mercedes, justicieras
