= Maricela González =

Colombian actress

- Born: December 8, 1968 (age 57); Pereira, Colombia
- Occupations: Actress, singer
- Years active: 1990–present

Maricela González (born 8 December 1968) is a Colombian actress, best known for her role as La Felina in El Señor de los Cielos and La Doña 2. She is also known for her recurring roles on the television series Pasión prohibida (2013) and En otra piel (2014).

== Filmography ==
=== Television roles ===
Year	Title	Roles	Note
1990	Adorable Mónica		
1996	Guajira	María	
1999	Me muero por ti	Fefa	
2001	Isabel me la veló	Rosa	
2004	Prisionera	Tuerta	
2005	Decisiones	Mercedes	Episode: "¿Culpable o inocente?"
2005	Los Reyes	María Eugenia	
2010	Perro amor	María	
2010	¿Dónde está Elisa?	Adriana Castañeda	Series regular; 63 episodes
2011–2012	Grachi	Lolo	Series regular (seasons 1–2); 69 episodes
2011–2012	Una Maid en Manhattan	Calixta Meléndez	
2013	Pasión prohibida	Francisca Piamonte	Series regular; 64 episodes
2014	En otra piel	Selma Carrasco	Series regular; 143 episodes
2016–2017, 2023–2026	El Señor de los Cielos	Eunice Lara "La Felina"	Recurring role (season 4, season 8–10); main role (season 5); 157 episodes
2017	Milagros de Navidad	Rocío Sánchez	Episode "Fervor en Nochebuena"
2020	La Doña	Eunice Lara "La Felina"	Main role (season 2); 75 episodes

== Awards and nominations ==
Year	Award	Category	Works	Result
2016	5th Your World Awards	The Best Bad Girl of Súper Serie	El Señor de los Cielos	Won
