= Robinson Díaz =

Colombian actor (born 1966)

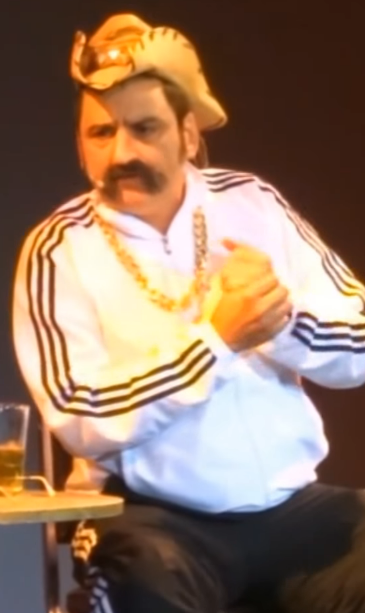
- Robinson Díaz in 2015
- Born: 1 May 1966 (age 60); Envigado, Antioquia, Colombia
- Education: University of Antioquia
- Occupation: Actor
- Years active: 1988–present

Robinson Díaz (born 1 May 1966 in Envigado, Antioquia, Colombia) is a Colombian actor. He is best known for his popular character El Cabo of series as El cartel, El Señor de los Cielos. He is also a teacher of Dramatic Art of the National School of Dramatic Art, graduated from the University of Antioquia.

== Filmography ==
Television roles
Year	Title	Role	Notes
1988	Garzas al amanecer	Doctor	3 episodes
1991	La casa de las dos palmas	Francisco	Final episodes
1993	Detrás de un ángel	Padre Abril	
1995	María Bonita	Carlos Santos	Recurring role; 32 episodes
1996	La otra mitad del sol	Diego	
1997–1998	La mujer del presidente	Carlos Alberto Buendía Serrano	Main role
1999	Marido y mujer	Juan Pablo Duque	Main role
1999	La dama del pantano	Rodolfo Gascón	
2002	María Madrugada	Mateo Echeverry	Main role
2003–2004	Pecados capitales	Gilberto Ramírez / Maestro Kandú	
2004	La saga, negocio de familia	Tomás Manrique	Main role in first phase; 186 episodes
2005	El baile de la vida	César Zambrano	Recurring role; 169 episodes
2006	Criminal	Alejandro Ruiz	
2007	Sobregiro de amor	Julián Monsalve	
2008	El Cartel de los Sapos	Milton Jiménez "El Cabo"	
2008	Vecinos	Óscar Leal	Main role 129 episodes
2012	El laberinto	Carlos Alberto Buendia	
2013	Mentiras perfectas	Mario Quintero	Colombian version of Nip/Tuck
2013–2014, 2017–2026	El Señor de los Cielos	Milton Jiménez "El Cabo" / Pío Jose Valdivia	
2015	Tiro de gracia	Salvador Chaparro / Vicente Vallejo	
2021	The Innocent (TV series)	Ibai Saez	Spanish TV series for Netflix
2025	Dinastía Casillas	Milton Jiménez "El Cabo"	
2026	Palacio	Belisario Betancur	Spanish TV series for Netflix
