= Carmen Aub =

Mexican actress

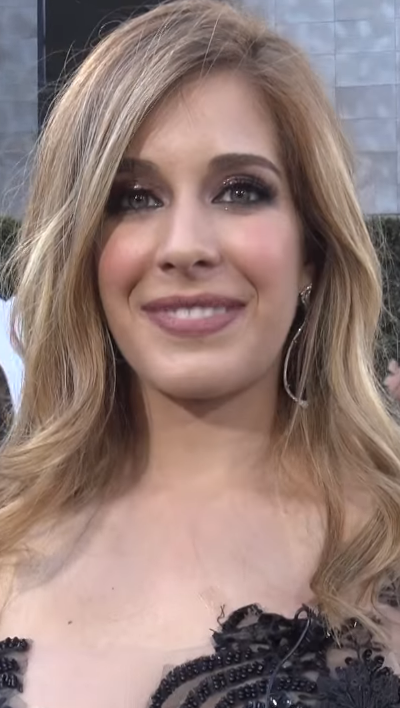
- Born: Carmen Aub Romero; October 24, 1989 (age 36); Mexico City, Mexico
- Occupation: Actress
- Years active: 2010-present

Carmen Aub Romero (born October 24, 1989) is a Mexican actress.

== Filmography ==
=== Film roles ===
Year	Title	Roles	Notes
2012	Chiapas, el corazón del café	Isabel	
2018	Una mujer sin filtro	Emilia	

=== Television roles ===
Year	Title	Roles	Notes
2010	¿Dónde está Elisa?	Flor Cáceres	Recurring role; 83 episodes
2010–2013	Niñas mal	Greta Domeneschi	Main role
2011–2012	Esperanza del corazón	Krista Cabral Duprís	Recurring role; 145 episodes
2013	Pasión prohibida	Nina Piamonte	Recurring role; 105 episodes
2013	Como dice el dicho	Lucía	Episode: "La suerte de la fea"
2014–2026	El Señor de los Cielos	Rutila Casillas	Recurring role (season 2); Main role (season 3–10)
2014	Familia en venta	Matilda	13 episodes
2017	Milagros de Navidad	Mariana Ramírez	Episode: "Jesús nació en California"
2021–2022	Parientes a la fuerza	Clío Bonnet	Main role
2022	Mujer de nadie	Roxana Vázquez de López	Recurring role
2024	La isla: desafío extremo	Herself	Contestant
2025	Regalo de amor	Bárbara Santillán Galindo	

== Awards and nominations ==
Year	Association	Category	Nominated works	Result
2012	TVyNovelas Award	Female Revelation	Esperanza del corazón	Nominated
2015	Premios Tu Mundo	The Best Bad Girl - Series	El Señor de los Cielos	Won
2015	Premios Tu Mundo	Best Supporting Actress - Series	El Señor de los Cielos	Won
2016	Premios Tu Mundo 2016	Favorite Lead Actress: Series	El Señor de los Cielos	Nominated
