= El Señor de los Cielos =

American television series

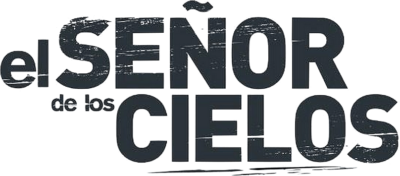
- Genre: Crime drama
- Created by: Luis Zelkowicz
- Written by: Juan Manuel Andrade; Mariano Calasso; Jorge Cervantes; Luis Colmenares; Guillermo Ríos; Carmina Narro; Andrés López; Laura Sosa; Iris Dubs
- Directed by: José Luis García Agraz; Carlos Villegas Rosales; Walter Doehner; Danny Gavidia; Jaime Segura; Juan Carlos Valdivia; Conrado Martínez; Mauricio Meneses; Bernardo Mota; Mauricio Corredor
- Creative directors: Carlos Herrera; Olin Díaz
- Starring: List of cast members
- Music by: Marco Flores; Rodrigo Maurovich; Eduardo Jaramillo; Rodrigo Maurovich; Joaquín Fernandez
- Opening theme: See below
- Country of origin: United States
- Original language: Spanish
- No. of seasons: 10
- No. of episodes: 887 (list of episodes)

Production
- Executive producers: Mariana Iskandariani; Jose Gerardo Guillén; Joshua Mintz; Marcela Mejía; Martha Godoy; Ximena Cantuarias; Harold Sánchez; Karen Barroeta; Luis Zelkowicz
- Producers: Monica Francesca Vizzi; Ana Graciela Ugalde; Carolina Leconte; Iván Aranda; Néstor Duque; Mabel Vargas
- Cinematography: Juan Bernardo Sánchez Mejía; José Gerardo de la Torre; Esteban de Llaca; Ignacio González; Damián Aguilar; Javier Morón
- Editors: Marco Antonio Martínez Domínguez; Andrés Eichelmann Kaiser; Rigel Sosa Andrade; Marcos González; Ramiro Pardo; Carlos Leal; Leandro Tizzano
- Camera setup: Multi-camera
- Production companies: Argos Comunicación (seasons 1–7); Caracol Televisión (season 1); Telemundo Studios

Original release
- Network: Telemundo
- Release: 15 April 2013 – 12 November 2026

Related
- El Chema; Dinastía Casillas

El Señor de los Cielos (in English: Lord of the Skies) is an American crime drama television series created by Luis Zelkowicz, based on an original idea by Mariano Calasso, and Andrés López. It premiered on Telemundo on 15 April 2013. The series is based on the life and work of Amado Carrillo Fuentes, the former leader of the Juárez Cartel. It stars Rafael Amaya as the titular character, Aurelio Casillas.

The series has won several awards including; International Emmy Award for Non-English Language U.S. Primetime Program. Premios Tu Mundo for Novela or serie of the Year for three consecutive years.

In May 2023, Telemundo renewed the series for a ninth season that premiered on 13 February 2024. In May 2024, Telemundo announced a spin-off sequel titled Dinastía Casillas, following Amaya's departure in the ninth season. In January 2026, the series was renewed for a tenth and final season, with Rafael Amaya returning as Aurelio Casillas. The season aired from 7 July 2026 to 12 November 2026.

== Synopsis ==
Season	Episodes	Originally released	
Season	Episodes	First released	Last released
1	74	15 April 2013	5 August 2013
2	84	26 May 2014	22 September 2014
3	104	21 April 2015	21 September 2015
4	80	28 March 2016	18 July 2016
5	95	20 June 2017	2 November 2017
6	99	8 May 2018	24 September 2018
7	75	14 October 2019	31 January 2020
8	88	17 January 2023	22 May 2023
9	94	13 February 2024	26 June 2024
10	90	7 July 2026	12 November 2026

The series follows the life of Aurelio Casillas, a Mexican drug lord who is recognized for knowing how to transfer drug substances to Mexico, Colombia, and the United States. Aurelio and his wife Ximena have three children, Rutila, Heriberto, and Luz Marina. He also has his faithful brother Chacorta who helps him in all his illicit businesses. Aurelio ends up being cornered by the authorities after being found as he decides to undergo a face operation in which he supposedly dies, thus causing his empire of power to fall.

In season two, believed to be dead, Aurelio returns to enact his revenge on police officer Leonor Ballesteros, who through her fault ends up operating his face in a failed attempt to escape from the authorities. Aurelio meets Victoria Navárez, a beautiful woman who throws herself to be the governor of Jalisco. Aurelio, after seeing her actions, falls in love and decides to deceive her by posing as another man and usurping the identity of Danilo Ferro. A character that is then introduced is José María "Chema" Venegas, one of the great enemies of Aurelio who decides to take all its power to Aurelio. At the end of the season, Leonor captures Aurelio and lasts several months in prison naval bunker.

In season three, after several months imprisoned in naval bunker in Mexico, Aurelio receives the mutilated head of his brother Chacorta in a box, giving him reason to wage a war against all his enemies and to find the murderer of his brother, to avenge his death. After all the problems with the government and the DEA, Aurelio learns that he suffers from kidney failure and decides to remember his past in order to find his lost son.

In season four, Aurelio after being cornered by his illness and not finding any relative that can donate a kidney, decides to undertake a search for all the lovers he had in order to find a lost son who can donate a kidney. Aurelio finally finds a young man named Ismael, who can be his salvation. His enemies, after learning of his illness, decide to do everything possible to get Ismael out of the way. When everything seems to take its course and achieve total stability in the world of legal and illegal businesses of Aurelio, Emiliana Contreras appears a beautiful woman sent by Feyo Aguilera to be able to make Aurelio fall, but her mission is to become Aurelio's lover in order to finally bring down his empire.

In season five, Aurelio, will unleash a new war, but this time it will not be against his former rivals and enemies – this time, it will be against his own family because of the betrayals he had previously experienced on their part. Later, Aurelio, will also face a serious illness, which puts his power and prestige at risk, as he is unable to find a donor for the transplant he needs to survive. On the other hand, Mónica fights for her life after being rescued from Víctor during their wedding, as she was shot while she fled, apparently mortally wounded. After Mónica is taken away from him, Víctor searches everywhere to find her whereabouts and continue with their wedding plans.

In season six, Aurelio Casillas recovered all the lost fortune and finally feels the need to retire. But it is time for retribution, the hatred that he sowed since he sold his soul to the drug trafficking demon is now knocking on his door with the face and blood of the many innocent people he destroyed. Aurelio will understand that his riches are an illusion, and that after being the great hunter he was, he will now become the prey. The women he mistreated, the men he betrayed, the political puppets he put in power, and even his own children will turn against him.

In season seven, to avoid falling into the hands of the American justice, Amado Leal "El Águila Azul", now Amado Casillas, has turned himself in to Bernardo Castillo, Secretary of Security of Mexico. The DEA commissioner, Joe Navarro, has made every attempt to achieve his extradition. What he does not know is that Baltazar Ojeda, a CIA agent, has the plan to eliminate Amado before, since he is the only one who can prove that within the organization in which both worked together, there is a scheme of corruption and murky management that endangers its existence within it and its freedom. He has already been transferred to a jail on the outskirts of the State of Mexico and is about to be taken to the airport, under strict security measures when the Casillas cartel tries to rescue him and Baltazar Ojeda himself tries to kill him. In the midst of this tension and in parallel, under the supervision of Doña Alba and a specialized doctor, they try a risky procedure to revive Aurelio.

Season eight centers on the return of Aurelio Casillas, who supposedly died at the beginning of the previous season after falling into a coma following an attempt on his life. It is only the DEA who knows that Aurelio is alive, having hidden him in the desert. In enacting his plan of revenge, Aurelio establishes connections with old allies, while also facing new romances and uncovering family mysteries.

== Cast and characters ==
- Rafael Amaya as Aurelio Casillas (seasons 1–6, 8–10; guest season 7; guest appearance in El Chema), the main protagonist of the series and also made a guest appearance in El Chema
- Ximena Herrera as Ximena Letrán (seasons 1–2)
- Robinson Díaz as Miltón Jiménez / Pío José Valdivia "El Cabo" (seasons 1, 6–7, 9; recurring seasons 2, 8; special guest star seasons 5, 10)
- Raúl Méndez as Víctor Casillas "Chacorta" (seasons 1–3)
- Carmen Villalobos as Leonor Ballesteros Mirelis (seasons 1–3)
- Gabriel Porras as Marco Cartagena Mejía (season 1)
- Mauricio Ochmann as José María Venegas Mendivil "El Chema" (seasons 2–3; special guest stars season 1; the main protagonist in the spin-off series of El Chema)
  - Alberto Guerra as José María Venegas Mendivil "El Chema" (season 6; recurring season 7)
- Fernanda Castillo as Mónica Robles Urdieta (seasons 2–5; recurring season 1; she also made a guest appearance in the spin-off series of El Chema)
- Marlene Favela as Victoria Navárez "La Gober" (season 2)
- Carmen Aub as Rutila Casillas Letrán (seasons 3–10; recurring season 2; guest appearance in the spin-off series of El Chema)
  - Terina Angell as Child Rutila (season 1)
  - Ana Sofía Durán as Child Rutila (season 2)
- Maritza Rodríguez as Amparo Rojas (seasons 3–4)
- Sabrina Seara as Esperanza Salvatierra Cortini (seasons 4–5, recurring season 3)
- Vanessa Villela as Emiliana Contreras Cortenas (seasons 4–5; guest appearance in the spin-off series of El Chema)
- Marisela González as Eunice Lara "La Felina" (season 5; recurring seasons 4, 8–10; main role in Season 2 of La Doña)
- Mariana Seoane as Mabel Castaño / Ninón de la Vielle (season 5; main role in the spin-off series of El Chema)
- Miguel Varoni as Leandro Quezada (seasons 5–6)
- Guy Ecker as Joe Navarro (seasons 6–7)
- Ninel Conde as María de los Ángeles "Evelina" López (seasons 6–7)
- Carlos Bardem as Don Leonidas "Chivo" Ahumada (season 6), Former Candidate for the Governor of Coahuila.
- Alejandro López Silva as El Súper Javi (season 6, 8; recurring seasons 3–5, 7; guest appearance in the spin-off series of El Chema)
- Francisco Gattorno as Gustavo Casasola (season 6)
- Jesús Moré as Omar Terán Robles (season 6; recurring seasons 3–5; guest appearance in the spin-off series of El Chema)
- Lisa Owen as Doña Alba Casillas (season 6; recurring seasons 1–3, 5, 7–8)
- Isabella Castillo as Diana Ahumada (seasons 6–10)
- María Conchita Alonso as Nora Requena (season 6)
- Matías Novoa as Amado Casillas Leal "El Águila Azul" (season 6–7)
- Iván Arana as Ismael Casillas Guerra (seasons 6–9; recurring seasons 4–5; guest appearance in the spin-off series of El Chema)
- Héctor Bonilla as Arturo López "El Rayo" (season 6)
- Roberto Escobar as José Ramiro Valdés (season 6; recurring season 7)
- Eduardo Santamarina as Balthazar Ojeda (season 7; recurring season 6)
- Danna García as Violeta Estrella (season 7)
- Rubén Cortada as Fernando Aguirre (season 8)
- África Zavala as Mecha de la Cruz (seasons 8–9)
- Yuri Vargas as Tracy Lobo (season 8)
- Itatí Cantoral as Belén San Román / Blanca Lovato (season 9)
- Julio Bracho as Ricardo Almenar (season 9)
- Jason Romo as Diego Bustamante (season 9)
- Roberto Sosa as General Santiago Cifuentes (season 10)
- Carlos Corona as Rigoberto Alfaro (season 10; recurring seasons 7–9)
- Ximena Gónzalez Rubio as Lucía Fernanda Estrada (season 10)
- David Ponce as José Manrique "Skinny" (season 10; recurring seasons 2–9)

== Production ==
In May 2012, the series was presented at Telemundo's upfront for the 2012–2013 television season. In June 2012, Rafael Amaya was cast in the lead role. Filming of the series began on 16 January 2013.

On 15 February 2022, Telemundo announced that the series had been renewed for an eighth season that premiered on 17 January 2023. On 11 May 2023, Telemundo renewed the series for a ninth season. The ninth season premiered on 13 February 2024.

On 24 April 2024, Rafael Amaya announced that he would be leaving Telemundo and the series after the ninth season. Weeks later, Telemundo ordered a spin-off sequel titled La dinastía Casillas, centering on Rutila and Ismael Casillas.

On 22 January 2026, Telemundo renewed the series for a tenth season, with Rafael Amaya set to reprise his role as Aurelio Casillas. On 18 May 2026, it was announced that the tenth season is going to be the final season.

== Crossovers ==
El Señor de los Cielos is known for taking place in the same universe as other famous narconovelas like El Chema (a spin-off of El Señor de los Cielos), Señora Acero, Queen of the South (the English adaptation of La Reina del Sur), Pablo Escobar: El Patrón del Mal, Dueños del Paraíso and La Doña. In the season 1 of El Señor de los Cielos, Pablo Escobar (Andrés Parra) from Pablo Escobar: El Patrón del Mal appears as a recurring character. In Señora Acero, Aurelio Casillas (Rafael Amaya), the protagonist of El Señor de los Cielos appeared in three episodes, two of the first season and one in the second season. Aurelio also appears in the English adaptation of La Reina del Sur, titled Queen of the South in which Aurelio Casillas is a big rival to Teresa Mendoza (Alice Braga), the main protagonist of Queen of the South and the head of Mendoza Cartel. Later Aurelio appeared in the sequel of the series El Señor de los Cielos, titled El Chema, the character appears in few episodes of the series. In the fifth season of El Señor de los Cielos, there is a crossover with Dueños del Paraíso when the main villain of Dueños del Paraiso, Leandro Quezada (Miguel Varoni), the head of Santa Norma Cartel (or Cartel de Santa Norma) goes to war against Aurelio Casillas for the control of drug trafficking and becomes the fiercest opponent that Aurelio Casillas has ever faced. In the sixth season of El Señor de los Cielos, there is a crossover with La Doña when the protagonist and main character of La Doña, Altagracia Sandoval or La Doña (Aracely Arámbula) becomes an unexpected ally of Aurelio Casillas after returning to Mexico after fleeing to France after the events in La Doña. Another crossover between El Señor de los Cielos and La Doña occurs in the second season when the characters Eunice Lara "La Felina" (Maricela González), and Amado Casillas "El Águila Azul" (Matías Novoa), two of the main characters of El Señor de los Cielos become recurring characters in La Doña.

== Related media ==
During the broadcast of the second season, Telemundo published a comic based on the second season of the series, portraying part of the plot of the series. In September 2014, the character played by Rafael Amaya, appeared in the series Señora Acero in the first two episodes of the series as a special guest, in November 2015 returned to have a special participation in the series in an episode with Ana Lucia Dominguez. The character of Aurelio has appeared twice in the adaptation of La Reina del Sur, titled Queen of the South.

=== Spin-off ===
Telemundo confirmed on May 15, 2016, that the series would have a spin-off based on actor Mauricio Ochmann's character "El Chema". El Chema premiered on December 6, 2016.

== Opening theme ==
All songs in the series are composed by Marco Flores and performed by Cardenales de Nuevo León. In the first season the main theme was "El jefe de todos". For the second season, the opening theme song was changed to "El verdadero Jefe de todos". In the third season the song was composed around the main character of the series and is titled "Aurelio Casillas". In the fourth season, the song of the main theme was changed to "El cuarto corrido". In the fifth season the opening theme titled "El quinto corrido", this time performed by Don Chayo, a member of the band Cardenales de Nuevo León. In the eighth season the opening theme is titled "Hierba mala nunca muere", performed by Los Tucanes de Tijuana. In the ninth season, the opening theme is titled "El hombre bestia". In the tenth season, the opening theme is titled "El que alto volaba".

== Ratings ==
Viewership and ratings per season of El Señor de los Cielos
Season	Timeslot (ET)	Episodes	First aired		Last aired		Avg. viewers (millions)
Season	Timeslot (ET)	Episodes	Date	Viewers (millions)	Date	Viewers (millions)	Avg. viewers (millions)
1	Mon–Fri 10:00 p.m.	74	15 April 2013	2.34	5 August 2013	3.62	N/A
2	Mon–Fri 10:00 p.m.	84	26 May 2014	2.20	22 September 2014	N/A	N/A
3	Mon–Fri 10:00 p.m.	104	21 April 2015	2.68	21 September 2015	2.95	N/A
4	Mon–Fri 10:00 p.m.	80	28 March 2016	2.79	18 July 2016	2.64	N/A
5	Mon–Fri 10:00 p.m.	88 (Note: Should reflect the number of episodes that contribute to the average given in the last column.)	20 June 2017	2.27	2 November 2017	2.54	1.92
6	Mon–Fri 10:00 p.m.	99	8 May 2018	2.14	24 September 2018	2.06	1.69
7	Mon–Fri 10:00 p.m.	75	14 October 2019	1.99	31 January 2020	1.32	1.20
8	Mon–Fri 9:00 p.m.	88	17 January 2023	1.62	22 May 2023	1.30	1.19
9	Mon–Fri 10:00 p.m.	77	13 February 2024	1.29	26 June 2024	N/A	1.02
10	Mon–Fri 9:00 p.m.	90	7 July 2026	1.49	12 November 2026	1.40	0.93

== Awards and nominations ==
Year	Award	Category	Nominated	Result	Ref
2013	2nd Your World Awards	Novela of the Year	El Señor de los Cielos	Nominated	
2013	2nd Your World Awards	Favorite Lead Actor	Rafael Amaya	Nominated	
2013	2nd Your World Awards	Favorite Lead Actress	Ximena Herrera	Nominated	
2013	2nd Your World Awards	The Best Bad Girl	Fernanda Castillo	Nominated	
2013	2nd Your World Awards	The Best Bad Girl	Sara Corrales	Nominated	
2013	2nd Your World Awards	The Best Bad Boy	Robinson Dáaz	Won	
2013	2nd Your World Awards	Best Supporting Actress	Angélica Celaya	Nominated	
2013	2nd Your World Awards	Best Supporting Actor	Raúl Méndez	Nominated	
2013	2nd Your World Awards	The Perfect Couple	Rafael Amaya and Ximena Herrera	Nominated	
2013	2nd Your World Awards	Mero Mero Award	Rafael Amaya	Special	
2013	5th People en Español Awards	Best telenovela	El Señor de los Cielos	Nominated	
2013	5th People en Español Awards	Best Actress	Ximena Herrera	Nominated	
2013	5th People en Español Awards	Best Actor	Rafael Amaya	Nominated	
2013	5th People en Español Awards	Best Female Antagonist	Fernanda Castillo	Nominated	
2013	5th People en Español Awards	Best Supporting Actress	Carmen Villalobos	Nominated	
2014	4th Miami Life Awards	Best Telenovela	El Señor de los Cielos	Nominated	
2014	4th Miami Life Awards	Best Male Lead in a Telenovela	Rafael Amaya	Nominated	
2014	4th Miami Life Awards	Best Female Lead in a Telenovela	Ximena Herrera	Nominated	
2014	3rd Your World Awards	Novela of the Year	El Señor de los Cielos	Nominated	
2014	3rd Your World Awards	Favorite Lead Actor	Rafael Amaya	Won	
2014	3rd Your World Awards	Favorite Lead Actress	Carmen Villalobos	Nominated	
2014	3rd Your World Awards	The Best Bad Boy	Mauricio Ochmann	Nominated	
2014	3rd Your World Awards	The Best Bad Girl	Fernanda Castillo	Nominated	
2014	3rd Your World Awards	Best Supporting Actor	Raúl Méndez	Nominated	
2014	3rd Your World Awards	The Perfect Couple	Fernanda Castillo and Rafael Amaya	Nominated	
2014	3rd Your World Awards	¡What a Daddy!	Rafael Amaya	Nominated	
2014	International Emmy Award	Non-English Language U.S. Primetime Program	El Señor de los Cielos	Won	
2014	6th People en Español Awards	Best Telenovela	El Señor de los Cielos	Nominated	
2014	6th People en Español Awards	Best Actress	Marlene Favela	Nominated	
2014	6th People en Español Awards	Best Actor	Rafael Amaya	Nominated	
2014	6th People en Español Awards	Best On-screen Chemistry	Fernanda Castillo and Rafael Amaya	Nominated	
2014	6th People en Español Awards	Best Female Antagonist	Fernanda Castillo	Nominated	
2015	4th Your World Awards	Súper series of the Year	El Señor de los Cielos	Won	
2015	4th Your World Awards	Favorite Lead Actor: Series	Rafael Amaya	Won	
2015	4th Your World Awards	Favorite Lead Actress: Series	Fernanda Castillo	Won	
2015	4th Your World Awards	Favorite Lead Actress: Series	Carmen Villalobos	Nominated	
2015	4th Your World Awards	The Best Bad Boy: Series	Mauricio Ochmann	Won	
2015	4th Your World Awards	The Best Bad Girl: Series	Carmen Aub	Won	
2015	4th Your World Awards	Best Supporting Actress: Series	Carmen Aub	Won	
2015	4th Your World Awards	Best Supporting Actor: Series	Manuel Balbi	Nominated	
2015	4th Your World Awards	Best Supporting Actor: Series	Tommy Vásquez	Won	
2015	4th Your World Awards	First Actress	Lisa Owen	Won	
2015	4th Your World Awards	The Best Actor with Bad Luck	Rafael Amaya	Won	
2015	4th Your World Awards	The Perfect Couple	Carmen Villalobos and Rafael Amaya	Nominated	
2016	6th Miami Life Awards	Best Male Lead in a Telenovela	Rafael Amaya	Nominated	
2016	6th Miami Life Awards	Best Female Lead in a Telenovela	Carmen Villalobos	Nominated	
2016	6th Miami Life Awards	Best Supporting Actor in a Telenovela	Mauricio Ochmann	Nominated	
2016	6th Miami Life Awards	Best Supporting Actress in a Telenovela	Maritza Rodríguez	Nominated	
2016	6th Miami Life Awards	Best Telenovela	El Señor de los Cielos	Nominated	
2016	5th Your World Awards	Súper series of the Year	El Señor de los Cielos	Won	
2016	5th Your World Awards	Revelation of the Year	Gala Montes	Won	
2016	5th Your World Awards	Favorite Lead Actor: Series	Rafael Amaya	Won	
2016	5th Your World Awards	Favorite Lead Actress: Series	Fernanda Castillo	Won	
2016	5th Your World Awards	Favorite Lead Actress: Series	Carmen Aub	Nominated	
2016	5th Your World Awards	Favorite Lead Actress: Series	Maritza Rodríguez	Nominated	
2016	5th Your World Awards	The Best Bad Boy: Series	Plutarco Haza	Nominated	
2016	5th Your World Awards	The Best Bad Boy: Series	Leonardo Daniel	Nominated	
2016	5th Your World Awards	The Best Bad Boy: Series	Christian Tappan	Nominated	
2016	5th Your World Awards	The Best Bad Girl: Series	Marisela González	Won	
2016	5th Your World Awards	The Best Actor with Bad Luck	Rafael Amaya	Won	
2016	5th Your World Awards	Favorite Actress	Sabrina Seara	Won	
2016	5th Your World Awards	Favorite Actor	Alejandro López	Nominated	
2016	5th Your World Awards	Favorite Actor	Jorge Luis Moreno	Nominated	
2016	5th Your World Awards	The Perfect Couple	Fernanda Castillo and Rafael Amaya	Won	
2017	6th Your World Awards	Favorite Súper Series	El señor de los cielos	Won	
2017	6th Your World Awards	Favorite Lead Actor	Rafael Amaya	Won	
2017	6th Your World Awards	Favorite Lead Actress	Fernanda Castillo	Nominated	
2017	6th Your World Awards	The Best Bad Boy	Jorge Luis Moreno	Nominated	
2017	6th Your World Awards	The Best Bad Girl	Marisela González	Nominated	
2017	6th Your World Awards	Favorite Actor	Plutarco Haza	Nominated	
2017	6th Your World Awards	Favorite Actress	Carmen Aub	Won	
2017	6th Your World Awards	The Perfect Couple	Rafael Amaya and Fernanda Castillo	Nominated	
2017	Produ Awards	Writer - Serie, Superserie or Telenovela of the Year	Luis Zelkowicz	Nominated	
2017	Produ Awards	Lead Actor - Serie, Superserie or Telenovela of the Year	Rafael Amaya	Nominated	
2017	Produ Awards	Superserie of the Year	El señor de los cielos	Nominated	
2017	Produ Awards	Fiction Program - Transmedia Use of the Year	El señor de los cielos	Nominated	
2018	46th International Emmy Awards	Best Non-English Language U.S. Primetime Program	El señor de los cielos	Nominated	
2023	Produ Awards	Best Superseries	El Señor de los Cielos	Nominated	
2023	Produ Awards	Best Opening / Program Header	El Señor de los Cielos	Won	
2023	Produ Awards	Best Lead Actor - Superseries or Telenovela	Rafael Amaya	Nominated	
2023	Produ Awards	Best Fiction Producer - Superseries or Telenovela	Karen Barroeta, Ximena Cantuarias and Harold Sánchez	Won	
2024	Rose d'Or Latinos Awards	Best Telenovela	El Señor de los Cielos	Nominated	
2024	Produ Awards	Best Superseries	El Señor de los Cielos	Won	
2024	Produ Awards	Best Lead Actor - Superseries or Telenovela	Rafael Amaya	Won	
2024	Produ Awards	Best Supporting Actress - Superseries or Telenovela	Carmen Aub	Nominated	
2024	Produ Awards	Best Supporting Actor - Superseries or Telenovela	Iván Arana	Nominated	
