= List of La Piloto characters =

La Piloto is an American crime drama television series created by W Studios and produced by Lemon Films Studios for Univision and Televisa. The series premiered on 7 March 2017 in the United States on Univision, and is currently in its first season.

== Overview ==
Character	Portrayed by	Seasons	
Character	Portrayed by	1	2
Main characters
Yolanda Cadena	Livia Brito	Main	Main
John Lucio	Arap Bethke	Main	Main
Zulima Montes	María Fernanda Yepes	Main	
Óscar Lucio	Alejandro Nones	Main	
Mónica Ortega	María de la Fuente	Main	Main
Lizbeth Álvarez	Verónica Montes	Main	Guest
Amanda Cuadrado	Natasha Domínguez	Main	
Estella Lesmes	María Fernanda García	Main	
Arley Mena	Mauricio Aspe	Main	Main
Rosalba Cadena	Stephanie Salas	Main	Main
Zeky Gilmas	Arturo Barba	Main	
Arnoldo Santamaría	Tommy Vásquez	Main	Main
Olivia Nieves	Macarena Achaga	Main	
Olivia Nieves	Oka Giner		Main
Dave Mejía	Juan Colucho	Main	Main
Andrea Pulido	Margarita Muñoz		Main
Irina Kilichenko	Ilza Ponko		Main
Vasily Kilichenko	Lisardo		Main
Bill Morrison	Paulo Quevedo		Main
Bastián Regueros	Juan Vidal		Main
Felicidad	Julia Urbini		Main
Muñeco	Mauricio Pimentel		Main
Wilmer Aguilar	Nico Galán	Recurring	Main
Gilberto Pulido	Julio Echeverry		Main
Recurring characters
Vergara	Jean Paul Leroux	Recurring	
Dean Simpson	Shalim Ortiz	Recurring	
Cristian Nieves	Andrés Delgado	Recurring	
Jorge Sinisterra	Gerardo Murguí	Recurring	
Sinisterra's wife	Adriana Nieto	Recurring	
Omar Nieves	Marcelo Buquet	Recurring	
Alberto Rubio	David Palacio	Recurring	
Capitán Argüelles	Rolando Brito	Recurring	
Ramón Cadena	Antonio de la Vega	Guest	
Elyfer Torres	Claire		Recurring
Arley Jr.	Diego Escalona		Recurring
Ana San Miguel	Aroa Gimeno		Recurring
Tony Waters	Mikael Lacko		Recurring

== Main characters ==
=== Yolanda Cadena ===
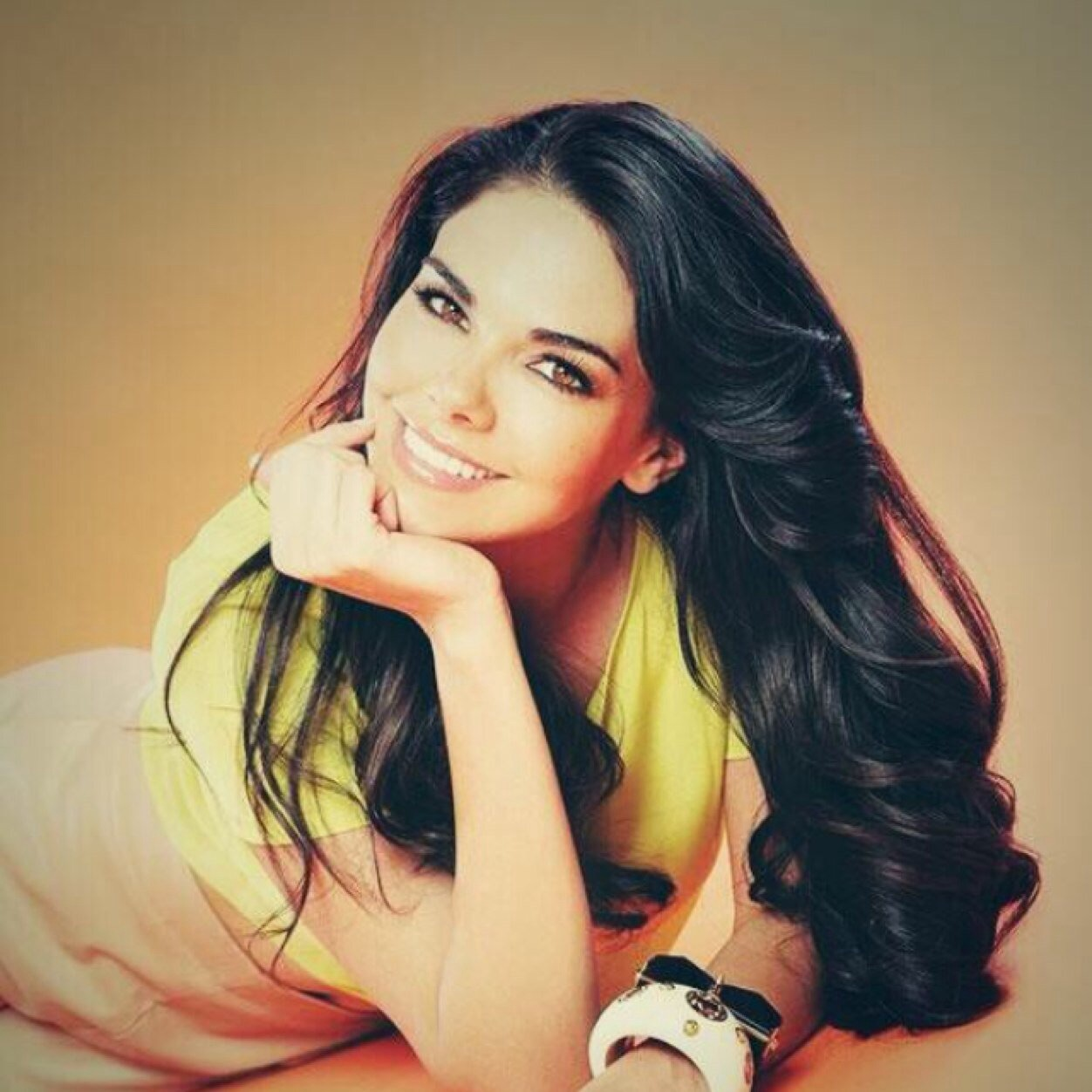
Livia Brito as titular character as Yolanda Cadena

Portrayed by Livia Brito — Yolanda Cadena is the protagonist. Originally from Tepic, her biggest dream is to fly airplanes. She has a magnetic personality, of those people who never leave anyone indifferent. She is brave, direct, impulsive, and sometimes too blunt for her own good. Yolanda is extremely loyal, so much that she prioritizes her friends and family, and they are huge motives for her actions and decisions. Her beauty causes men to want to take advantage of her. Yolanda is very distrustful of men because her godfather, Ernesto, raped her when she was eighteen, which greatly scarred her. She does not give her heart away to anyone easily, despite catching Dave Mejía's and John Lucio's eye later on.

Ramón, Yolanda's father and greatest hero, also shared her love for airplanes and flying. He spent his life stealing cars and disarming them out of necessity. Unfortunately, he could never fulfill his dream of getting on a plane. Despite being a thief, Ramón was a peaceful man, who was unjustly murdered by two police officers while Yolanda's was hiding underneath a car. Yolanda began hating and disliking the cops because of his murder and considered them as thugs and corrupt. She has been constantly torn between legality and illegality. After her father died, she was at the mercy of her estranged drunk mother, Estella. Yolanda left home and got a job as a stewardess in Central America Air. She fell in love with Dave Mejía and then with John Lucio as Season 1 progressed. John Lucio taught her how to fly. After becoming a drug lord, DEA agent, Dave Mejía, arrested Yolanda, and they fell in love, but it has been an impossible love because of being on different sides of the law.

=== John Lucio ===
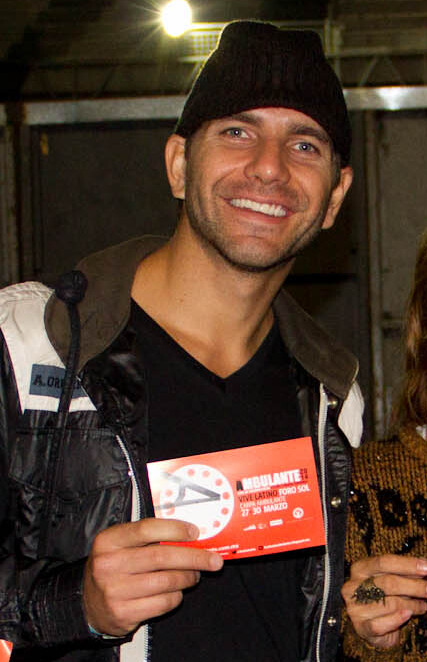
Arap Bethke stars as John Lucio

Portrayed by Arap Bethke — John Lucio, strong and determined with nerves of steel, always has known how to impose himself and get what he wants. He remains fearless. He owns an aviation company as a cover for his illegal businesses. His familial relationship with his brother, Óscar, clashes a lot because of their differences, but they still have a strong bond nevertheless. John Lucio's romantic relationship with Yolanda worsened their brotherly bond and their ability to trust each other. As an experienced pilot, he taught Yolanda how to fly. He kept pursuing Yolanda because she was the only woman that kept rejecting him. Zulima tricked John to thinking Yolanda betrayed him, so he ordered to have Yolanda killed. In return, Yolanda got vengeance and put John in jail. While escaping, John joined Colonel Santamaría and the Russian Mafia, led by Kilichenko to look for Yolanda and destroy her.

=== Zulima Montes ===
Portrayed by María Fernanda Yepes — Zulima likes her companions. She is very beautiful, dazzling, but she suffers the most with her appearance. Envy the natural beauty of the others, especially of Yolanda. From the age of 17 she became independent and for a couple of years she had to work secretly as a dancer and prostitute to be able to maintain herself. When he met Zeki Yilmaz in a table dance, he managed to conquer it and become his lover. Zeki is the one who took her out of prostitution and took her to Central America to work as a stewardess.

=== Óscar Lucio ===
Portrayed by Alejandro Nones — Óscar Lucio is John's brother. He is hated because of his violent nature. John has always taken care of him, something that Óscar deeply appreciates. Little by little and with a lot of work, they were ascending and configuring the organizations in which they work. They have created their own criminal enterprise with great success. Oscar's idea is to gather enough wealth to retire to a place where no one can find them, but that moment seems to never come. Óscar is rude and misogynistic. He has killed several times and is not afraid to do it when necessary, especially if they are women, in the same way that they do not attract him, although he has never declared himself homosexual. But this embarrasses him because he believes he will make him look weak in the face of his enemies and tries to hide him behind an armor of aggression. Since he met Yolanda, he distrusts her. He sees in Yolanda the woman who can take away his position in his brother's life and keep him away from him and focus on a single goal for the rest of his life: killing her and her friends is Óscar's only goal.

=== Mónica Ortega ===
Portrayed by María de la Fuente — Mónica Ortega she is the right hand of Dave Mejía in the investigation of the DEA and the Mexican government against Central America Air and the Lucio brothers. A woman highly trained officer, with nerves of steel, thrown and brave. She takes his job very seriously. She is formal in her actions and thoughts, conservative, very convinced of her ideals. She has a great repulsion to criminals. Much to his regret, he falls in love with Dave, but she realizes with anger that he only has eyes for his "beloved Yolanda".

=== Lizbeth Álvarez ===
Portrayed by Verónica Montes — Lizbeth Álvarez she is one of the most veteran of the group, but no less beautiful. She is rather reserved, quiet, very observant, but she always has good advice to share. She is very intuitive, smart and romantic, and seeks to find a man who really falls in love with her. As a flight attendant, she is very efficient. Accept the Lucio's offer to work as head of caletas. Her main job is to create hiding places to store merchandise and money, for which she always has ingenious ideas. She becomes Yolanda's right hand, the most faithful of her friends and the one who always appears to save her in the most difficult moments.

=== Amanda Cuadrado ===
Portrayed by Natasha Domínguez — Amanda Cuadrado she is a young stewardess who later joins Yolanda's team of pilots. She aspires to a life of luxury. Due to his lack of education, he was never able to study for a university degree. So she decided to be a stewardess, although she could be a fashion designer because she likes clothes, makeup, hairstyles. That is his talent. In Yolanda's organization she takes care of the whole aesthetic part of the matter: how to dress and style girls, how to seduce men. Amanda is pregnant by sniper Arley Mena, who abandons her and becomes a single mother. Upon discovering the tricks of Zulima to destroy Yolanda, she sabotages her car, which causes Amanda to end up very badly wounded. Then Zulima drowns her and dies, leaving her son Arley an orphan.

=== Estella Lesmes ===
Portrayed by María Fernanda García — Estella Lesmes she is an unpleasant woman who never learned to do anything in life other than drinking alcohol and staying drunk every day. She is very disheveled, dirty, half crazy, always seems to be on the verge of a nervous breakdown. When her husband Ramón died, the little sanity she had left was gone. As she never learned to support herself, she lives off what others give her, especially of Rosalba and Ernesto, her sister-in-law and his lover respectively. She has a terrible relationship with Yolanda, because she has always blamed her for her misfortunes and lack of money. She wants Yolanda to take care of her and pay her for so many years of "taking care of her and keeping her".

=== Arley Mena ===
Portrayed by Mauricio Aspe — Arley Mena he is the most efficient servant of the Lucio brothers. He is a hired assassin. The only thing that moves him are women and liquor. Although he never falls in love, he manages to take great care of Amanda. But when she tells him that she is pregnant with him, he leaves her, because she does not think about raising children. In the end, when Amanda dies, Mena is interested in knowing her son, and becoming a good person so that he can protect her only child.

=== Rosalba Cadena ===
Portrayed by Stephanie Salas — Rosalba Cadena she is the older sister of Yolanda's father, lives in Tepic and works as a seamstress. Woman with a big heart, always loved her brother very much and loves Yolanda. She has always urged Yolanda to pursue her dreams, so that she does not give up, but she also encourages Yolanda to be honest and stay away from problems with justice. Knowing that her niece is involved with criminals makes her suffer, but in spite of that she never withdraws her support. Yolanda's enemies always attack Rosalba to affect Yolanda, because she is her only loved one.

=== Zeky Gilmas ===
Portrayed by Arturo Barba — Zeky Gilmas is of Turkish origin, is a man of great size, tall, elegant, high level executive, who appears to be honest but is actually quite crooked. It is imposing, strong, inflicts respect among people, except for the Lucio brothers. He has great ingenuity for illicit business. He is obsessed with money, but above all with power. That's why he hates being the right hand of the Lucio brothers, with whom he has a relationship of friendship and hatred. He is married and has two teenage children he adores. Although he loves his family, he really is in love with Zulima, but she has only used it at her whim.

=== Arnoldo Santamaría ===
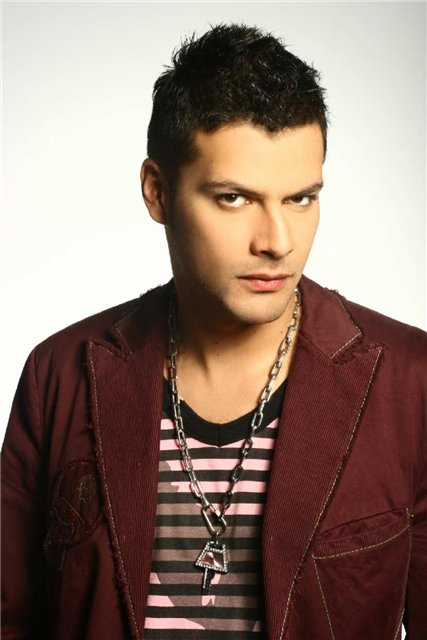
Tommy Vásquez stars as Arnoldo Santamaría

Portrayed by Tommy Vásquez — Arnoldo Santamaría he is married and has a daughter. Presents a psychological picture of schizophrenia, which has managed to hide very well thanks to his military career. He is a corrupt and unscrupulous man. He has used his prestige as a soldier, his uniform and medals as a facade for his dark personality. It has violent episodes like depressive moments. His troops fear him because he has even ordered the killing of one or another of his own soldiers. He is considered one of the most efficient military, for which he was assigned to an area of high presence of criminals. He has no problem torturing or mutilating to get what he wants or needs. By capturing Yolanda in the jungle, he becomes completely obsessed with her, wanting to turn her into his personal slave. Yolanda pretends to be attracted to him in order to control him while looking for a way to escape from her clutches. When Yolanda manages to escape the battalion that has been her prison, Santamaria loses an eye (because of Yolanda) and, from that moment, loses his sanity and pursues her to submit her to his wishes again. He later joins Mónica Ortega and become one of the loyal servants and new security chief of the Russian Mafia led by Kilichenko.

=== Olivia Nieves ===
Portrayed by Macarena Achaga (Season 1) and Oka Giner (Season 2) — Olivia Nieves she works at the airline to be able to pay for the trip to Europe and find her boyfriend. When she is out of work, joins the criminal group of Yolanda, as head of security, because she knows about weapons. In her family there is a policeman: her father Omar, so she is always in danger of discovering what she is involved with. Omar will begin to suspect that Olivia may be in trouble and will try to help her.

=== Dave Mejía ===
Portrayed by Juan Colucho — Dave Mejía he is an agent of the DEA. Handsome, serious, incorruptible, thrown. Infiltration expert, he is very intuitive and intelligent. He has dedicated himself to his work for years and has put aside his personal life. Dave has dedicated himself to fighting drug trafficking with vehemence, convinced that drugs are a cancer for society. Sometimes his certainties fail and he wonders if so much effort is serving something and if the war on drugs is possible to win it. Arrives in Culiacan behind the track of the Lucio brothers and the airline Centroamérica Air. There he infiltrates himself posing as a steward under the name of Alberto Díaz. After dismantling the airline, take the case of Yolanda and her team of pilots to disarm the gang and capture them all. He manages to arrest Yolanda and get her an agreement so that she can tell the ringleaders, so that she can go to live protected in the United States. Since he knows her, Dave feels a very strong connection for her. He intuits that deep down she is a woman with a big heart and that she only wants to fulfill her dream and honor her father, not a mafia. Yolanda falls in love with him, finally finds the man who is willing to love her for what she is, to respect and support her, but her love will be impossible since they are on opposite sides of the law.

=== Andrea Pulido ===
Portrayed by Margarita Muñoz — Andrea Pullido she is Giberto's daughter and she works at the airline to be able to pay for as prostitute.

=== Irina Kilichenko ===
Portrayed by Ilza Ponko — Irina Kilichenko is Vasily Kilichenko's daughter. Effective loyal servant and second in command of Russian Mafia.

=== Vasily Kilichenko ===
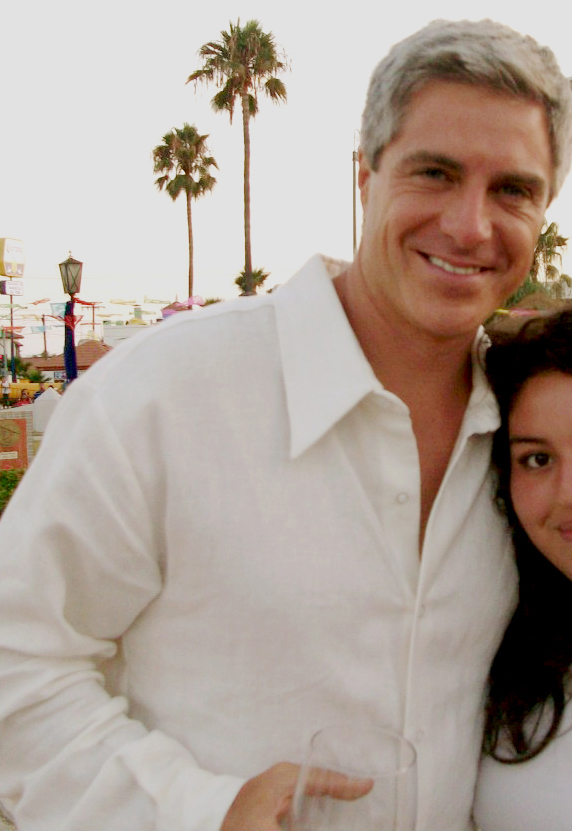
Lisardo stars as Vasily Killichenko

Portrayed by Lisardo — Vasily Kilichenko is he Irina's father. Effective head and leader of Russian Mafia. He always knows how to impose himself and get what he wants from people.

=== Bill Morrison ===
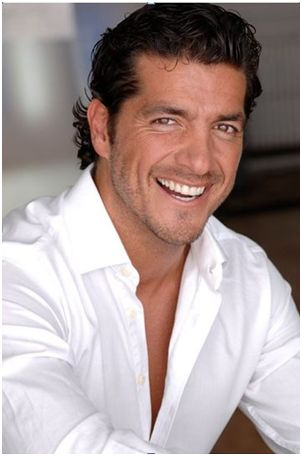
Paulo Quevedo stars as Bill Morrison

Portrayed by Paulo Quevedo — Bill Morrison he is airplane pilot and Yolanda and Olivia's partner. Handsome, serious, thrown. Olivia falls in love with him.

=== Bastián Regueros ===
Portrayed by Juan Vidal — Bastían Regueros he is airplane chief.

Others main characters

- Julia Urbini as Felicidad
- Mauricio Pimentel as Muñeco
- Nico Galán as Wilmer Aguilar
- Julio Echeverry as Gilberto Pulido

== Recurring characters ==
=== Introduced in season one ===
- Jean Paul Leroux as Vergara, is a henchman of the Shadow Cartel. Serious man, effective servant and right hand of the cartel.
- Shalim Ortiz as Dean Simpson, he is a corrupt agent of the DEA who conspires with the Lucio Brother's for his criminal purposes. Mónica Ortega is seduced to have her in his hands, but he ends up discovering it. Already in prison, he is killed by an infiltrator to prevent him from speaking.
- Andrés Delgado as Cristian Nieves
- Gerardo Murguía as Jorge Sinisterra
- Adriana Nieto as Sinisterra's wife
- Marcelo Buquet as Omar Nieves
- David Palacio as Alberto Rubio
- Rolando Brito as Capitán Argüelles

=== Introduced in season two ===
- Diego Escalona as Arley Jr.
- Aroa Gimeno as Ana San Miguel
- Mikael Lacko as Tony Waters
- Daniel Bretón as Octavio Mina
- Mario Erosa as Flores
- Gina Varela as Mariela Solano
- Adriana Larrañaga as Estefanía Chávez
- Yolanda Ventura as Abigail León "The Boss"
