= La Piloto season 1 =

La Piloto
- Season 1
- Promotional poster
- Starring: Livia Brito; Arap Bethke; María Fernanda Yepes; Alejandro Nones; María de la Fuente; Verónica Montes; Natasha Domínguez; María Fernanda García; Mauricio Aspe; Stephanie Salas; Arturo Barba; Tommy Vásquez; Macarena Achaga; Juan Colucho
- No. of episodes: 80

Release
- Original network: Univision
- Original release: 7 March – 26 June 2017

Season chronology
- Next → Season 2

The first season of the American television series La Piloto, created by Jörg Hiller, follows the story of Yolanda Cadena (Livia Brito) and all her efforts to become an airplane pilot.

The season was ordered in May 2016, and filming began on 5 September 2016. The season stars Livia Brito as Yolanda Cadena, Arap Bethke as John Lucio, María Fernanda Yepes as Zulima Montes, Alejandro Nones as Óscar Lucio, María de la Fuente as Mónica Ortega, Verónica Montes as Lizbeth Álvarez, Natasha Domínguez as Amanda Cuadrado, María Fernanda García as Estela Lesmes, Mauricio Aspe as Arley Mena, Stephanie Salas as Rosalba, Arturo Barba as Zeky Gilmas, Tommy Vásquez as Coronel Santamaría, Macarena Achaga as Olivia, and Juan Colucho as Dave Mejía.

The first season began airing on 7 March 2017, and concluded on 26 June 2017.

== Cast ==
=== Main ===
- Livia Brito as Yolanda Cadena, the series' protagonist, her dream is to become an airplane pilot.
- Arap Bethke as John Lucio, he is an airplane pilot, has an airplane company with his brother Oscar and uses it as a front for his illicit business. He teaches Yolanda everything about aviation.
- María Fernanda Yepes as Zulima Montes, she is the best friend of Yolanda, who works for Central America Air as a stewardess.
- Alejandro Nones as Óscar Lucio, he's John's brother.
- María de la Fuente as Mónica Ortega, she is assisting Dave in the DEA's investigation and the Mexican government against Central America Air and the Lucio brothers.
- Verónica Montes as Lizbeth Álvarez, she is one of Yolanda's aides, working as a stewardess in Central America Air.
- Natasha Domínguez as Amanda Cuadrado, she is one of Yolanda's aides, working as a stewardess in Central America Air and for Yolanda as her helper to commit illicit business.
- María Fernanda García as Estela Lesmes, she is Yolanda's mom.
- Mauricio Aspe as Arley Mena, he is one of the helpers of the Lucio brothers, Amanda's lover and Guillermo's father.
- Stephanie Salas as Rosalba Cadena, she is Yolanda's aunt.
- Arturo Barba as Zeky Gilmas, he is the main manager of Central América Air and partner of the Lucio brothers.
- Tommy Vásquez as Arnoldo Santamaría, he is a Colombian guerrilla lieutenant.
- Macarena Achaga as Olivia Nieves, she is Yolanda's chief of security and help with the use of weapons.
- Juan Colucho as Dave Mejía, he is an agent of the DEA that tries to imprison the Lucio brothers and to eliminate the company Central America Air.

=== Recurring ===
- Jean Paul Leroux as Commissioner of the Cártel de las Sombras
- Shalim Ortiz as Dean Simpson, corrupt agent infiltrated in the DEA.
- Andrés Delgado as Cristian Nieves, Olivia's brother.
- Rolando Brito as Capitán Argüelles, corrupt commander.
- Marcelo Buquet as Omar Nieves, Olivia's father.
- Gerardo Murguía as Jorge Sinisterra
- Adriana Nieto as Sinisterra's wife
- David Palacio as Alberto Rubio

=== Special guest stars ===
- Antonio de la Vega as Ramón Cadena, Yolanda's father.

== Episodes ==
No. overall	No. in season	Title	Original release date	US viewers (millions)
1	1	"Chapter 1"	7 March 2017	1.92
Yolanda is captured in Colombia by Colonel Santamaría when trying to transfer drugs in a plane and she tells the colonel how everything started. Yolanda flees from her hometown because her godfather tries to rape her, but she defends herself and her friend Zulima helps her get a job as a stewardess.
2	2	"Chapter 2"	8 March 2017	1.79
Yolanda manages to leave the airport without any problem, but loses all the money she had with her. Yolanda goes to the place where the money would be given to face, but a war begins between John and the cartel and both try to flee. Lucio is injured and Yolanda tries to help him. John proposes to Yolanda to make a pact to return all the money that lost.
3	3	"Chapter 3"	9 March 2017	1.94
Yolanda and Zulima help John escape from the airport, while fleeing collide and the car explodes, but all manage to escape the police. John offers Yolanda and her friends to work for him and his brother. Jhon helps Yolanda pilot a plane for the first time.
4	4	"Chapter 4"	10 March 2017	1.70
Oscar's men are about to abuse Yolanda and Lizbeth, but the police save them. Lizbeth tells Yolanda that she will agree to work with John.
5	5	"Chapter 5"	13 March 2017	1.85
Oscar learns that there is an infiltrate in the airline. John faints in the plane, Yolanda and some men take him to a hospital. John demands Yolanda to turn away from John or he will kill her.
6	6	"Chapter 6"	14 March 2017	1.76
John finds out that Yolanda is at Dave's house and goes to look for her. Ernesto asks Zulima for Yolanda's address.
7	7	"Chapter 7"	15 March 2017	1.87
Dave tells John and Oscar that he wants to work for them, but they refuse and try to kill him. Yolanda kisses John for the first time.
8	8	"Chapter 8"	16 March 2017	1.93
Yolanda believes that John's people murdered Hector. Yolanda tells Dave that Ernesto abused her and is looking for her.
9	9	"Chapter 9"	17 March 2017	1.86
John betrays Dave and sets him up for arrest in Miami. Yolanda discovers that Dave is an agent of the DEA.
10	10	"Chapter 10"	20 March 2017	1.77
Yolanda and the Colombians manage to escape from the DEA agents in Miami. Zeki manages to escape the Lucio and takes Zulima with him, but finds his family dead in a cellar.
11	11	"Chapter 11"	21 March 2017	1.80
Yolanda tries to control the plane after Zeki kills the pilot, but they suffer a terrible accident and the survivors are in different places. The stewardesses are captured and taken to the police station for questioning by the DEA.
12	12	"Chapter 12"	22 March 2017	1.92
Yolanda kills Ernesto in self-defense and to evade his responsibility he offers John to be his best driver and his wife. Oscar puts a car bomb at the police station.
13	13	"Chapter 13"	23 March 2017	1.57
Yolanda sees that the director of the hospital gives a video of the murder of Ernesto to a policeman and robs it so that they do not discover that she is the assassin. Dave watches the room where Yolanda's aunt is to find her.
14	14	"Chapter 14"	24 March 2017	1.35
The Lucio brothers meet with the senator's men, he wants to expand the market and they accept. Yolanda manages to get her Aunt Rosaura out of the hospital with the help of John.
15	15	"Chapter 15"	27 March 2017	1.54
Dave tries to convince Yolanda to surrender, but she refuses. Mónica is determined to hire Estela to help them find Yolanda.
16	16	"Chapter 16"	28 March 2017	1.72
Zeki follows Zulima and tries to assassinate her. Estela apologizes to Yolanda and tells her that she wants to be with her and be a good mother, but it is a trap for the police to arrest her.
17	17	"Chapter 17"	29 March 2017	1.72
Zeki tells the police he will confess what he knows about John and Oscar if they give him immunity. Yolanda discovers that Estela has a microphone.
18	18	"Chapter 18"	30 March 2017	1.60
Estela confesses to Yolanda that she helped the police find her. Vargas kills Zeki. Zulima becomes jealous to know that seeing Yolanda and John together.
19	19	"Chapter 19"	31 March 2017	1.65
John and Oscar open a bar and ask the girls to work there. Dave goes to look for Estela at his house to find out about Yolanda, but she tells him that she does not know where she is.
20	20	"Chapter 20"	3 April 2017	1.60
Zulima tells Oscar that Yolanda was intimate with Dave and wants to get rid of her because he hates her. Amanda is about to confess to Mena that she is pregnant, but she finds him with another woman.
21	21	"Chapter 21"	4 April 2017	1.74
Zulima confesses to Yolanda that she was intimate with John. Some men try to kidnap Yolanda, but she manages to escape.
22	22	"Chapter 22"	5 April 2017	1.56
Vargas tries to assassinate Estela and Dave almost discovers it. Oscar asks Zulima to steal Yolanda's phone to see if he's betraying them.
23	23	"Chapter 23"	6 April 2017	1.69
Rosalba asks John to take care of Yolanda before leaving. Zulima tells John all the secrets of Yolanda to get rid of her.
24	24	"Chapter 24"	7 April 2017	1.37
Estela tells Rosalba that Yolanda killed Ernesto. A man shoots Oscar in the back.
25	25	"Chapter 25"	10 April 2017	1.65
Mónica tells Dave that she thinks Simpson might be the infiltrator. Roberto tells Oscar that he wants to work for him.
26	26	"Chapter 26"	11 April 2017	1.53
Some men attack the truck Yolanda travels to Colombia. Mónica and Dave travel to Villa Antigua to investigate if John and Lucio are there, but Captain Argüelles denies having any important information.
27	27	"Chapter 27"	12 April 2017	1.64
Aurora thanks Yolanda for rescuing her from her abduction and offers her help in Colombia. John orders to decompose Yolanda's plane to die.
28	28	"Chapter 28"	13 April 2017	1.62
Commander Santamaría meets Yolanda and arrests her at the military base in Colombia. Oscar tells John that Yolanda is dead and he asks her to get rid of her family and friends.
29	29	"Chapter 29"	14 April 2017	1.50
Oscar orders Roberto to kill Olivia and her friends. Amanda confesses to Mena that she is pregnant so that he does not murder her, but his plan does not work.
30	30	"Chapter 30"	17 April 2017	1.82
Cindy finds Amanda in the river and takes her to her house. Yolanda agrees to help the army find John and Oscar.
31	31	"Chapter 31"	18 April 2017	1.68
Salvador tells Oscar that Yolanda is alive and he asks her to murder her. Amanda wakes up, realizes that Cindy saved her and asks her not to tell Mena that she's alive.
32	32	"Chapter 32"	19 April 2017	1.82
Santamaría tries to abuse Yolanda, but she hits him. Mena tries to murder Lizbeth in jail, but Raul saves her.
33	33	"Chapter 33"	20 April 2017	1.82
Zulima listens to Cindy talk to her mother and discovers that Amanda is alive. John and Oscar capture Bochas and assassinate him.
34	34	"Chapter 34"	21 April 2017	1.70
Zulima tells John and Oscar that Amanda and Lizbeth are alive. Raúl discovers that Argüelles works with John and Lucio and prevents that it assassinates to Lizbeth.
35	35	"Chapter 35"	24 April 2017	1.73
The men of Salvador catch Yolanda, but Santamaría murders them and takes her to the lair again. Carmen learns that Cindy died. Mónica helps John and Oscar escape.
36	36	"Chapter 36"	25 April 2017	1.78
Teresa calls John to give Yolanda information, but Oscar answers and gives the information to him. Yolanda tells Santamaría that she does not want to leave the lair and kiss him.
37	37	"Chapter 37"	26 April 2017	1.80
Simpson kills Sofia when he tries to escape with Mónica. Caicedo explodes grenades in the military barracks to assassinate Yolanda.
38	38	"Chapter 38"	27 April 2017	1.70
Mónica confesses to Dave that she helped John and Oscar escape because they threatened her. Rubio tells Yolanda that he believes Caicedo had something to do with the explosion.
39	39	"Chapter 39"	28 April 2017	1.84
Cañengo and Mena are taken to prison. Dave tells Rosalba that Yolanda is dead.
40	40	"Chapter 40"	1 May 2017	1.90
Salvador confesses to Dave that Santamaría kidnapped Yolanda. Santamaria's wife discovers that there is a woman working with the soldiers and she becomes jealous.
41	41	"Chapter 41"	2 May 2017	1.81
Yolanda steals a helicopter and manages to escape from the lair. Rubio tells Santamaría that the effects of methanol that Yolanda gave him caused blindness.
42	42	"Chapter 42"	3 May 2017	1.80
Yolanda calls John, Oscar answers and tells him that he will help her return with them. Dave tries to save Yolanda, but she demands that he leave her alone.
43	43	"Chapter 43"	4 May 2017	1.89
Yolanda arrives at the track, Santamaría and Rubio attack her, but Dave and the police appear. Oscar meets Yolanda and tries to assassinate her, but she manages to escape.
44	44	"Chapter 44"	5 May 2017	1.92
Dave goes to the house of Rosalba to look for Yolanda but discovers that there are some strange men. Yolanda rejoins Olivia.
45	45	"Chapter 45"	8 May 2017	1.82
Oscar tells Yolanda that if he surrenders he will free Cristian and Estela. Cañengo tells the lawyer that Mena plans to betray John and Oscar.
46	46	"Chapter 46"	9 May 2017	1.68
Roberto is about to tell Argüelles that Yolanda is alive, but Zulima discovers it and threatens him with a pistol. Yolanda meets John and he confesses that he tried to assassinate her because he betrayed him.
47	47	"Chapter 47"	10 May 2017	1.57
John and Oscar try to assassinate Raúl in the hospital, but Mónica saves him. Dave arrests Yolanda and forces her to go with him.
48	48	"Chapter 48"	11 May 2017	1.73
Mónica takes the police to Rosalba's house to arrest Yolanda, but Dave helps her escape. John suspects that Zulima and Oscar knew that Yolanda was alive.
49	49	"Chapter 49"	12 May 2017	1.55
Montgomery calls Mónica to get information from Dave, but she denies knowing anything about him. John tells Yáñez that he will be his new security chief and asks him to find Yolanda.
50	50	"Chapter 50"	15 May 2017	1.57
Yáñez catches Yolanda and she proposes to him to make a deal to get rid of John. Mónica goes to get Olivia to her house and John's men kidnap her.
51	51	"Chapter 51"	16 May 2017	1.80
Yañez agrees to work with Yolanda to get rid of John. Oscar confesses to John that Yolanda did not betray him, he gets very bad and tries to assassinate Zulima, but she escapes with Roberto.
52	52	"Chapter 52"	17 May 2017	1.79
John forgives Zulima's life in exchange for not betraying him with the police and leaving the country. Amanda visits Mena in jail to show her that she was pregnant.
53	53	"Chapter 53"	18 May 2017	1.69
Mena tells Amanda that she hid money in the bar of Villa Antigua and asks her not to tell Zulima. Yolanda tells Dave that he captured John and wants to hand him over to the authorities.
54	54	"Chapter 54"	19 May 2017	1.55
Mónica proposes to John to cooperate to capture to Oscar but he refuses. Lizbeth tells Raúl about the money that is hidden in Villa Antigua.
55	55	"Chapter 55"	22 May 2017	1.56
Yolanda and Dave live a moment of passion. Oscar tries to get John out of jail, but Dave sets them up.
56	56	"Chapter 56"	23 May 2017	1.59
John is officially surrendered to the Attorney General of Mexico. Oscar escapes from an ambush planned by the police.
57	57	"Chapter 57"	24 May 2017	1.65
Yolanda, Olivia and Lizbeth take Amanda's baby to Rosalba's house after being robbed from the hospital. Dave promises to Monica that she will watch over her in jail.
58	58	"Chapter 58"	25 May 2017	1.36
Oscar kills Montgomery. Oscar's men kidnap a Benavides relative to force him to help John.
59	59	"Chapter 59"	26 May 2017	1.36
Mena and John fight in jail. Rubio threatens Santamaria with a weapon to forget Yolanda, but he kills him.
60	60	"Chapter 60"	29 May 2017	1.57
Some men enter Rosalba's house and kidnap the girls and the baby. Dave believes that Oscar kidnapped Yolanda and her friends, but he denies being with them.
61	61	"Chapter 61"	30 May 2017	1.52
Santamaría goes to look for John and asks for help to find Yolanda. Yolanda refuses to tell Dave that she will work for the narco again.
62	62	"Chapter 62"	31 May 2017	1.62
Óscar and Santamaría seal an alliance to prevent John from being extradited to the United States and murdering Yolanda. "El Cártel de las Sombras" orders Yolanda to kill John.
63	63	"Chapter 63"	1 June 2017	1.67
Óscar is horribly injured after rescuing John and jumping off the DEA plane. Yolanda is tortured by El cártel de las Sombras for not killing John.
64	64	"Chapter 64"	2 June 2017	1.52
Mena goes to get her son to the hospital and a woman informs him that the baby was stolen. Dave tells Fajardo that Oscar and John were attacked on the plane and escaped.
65	65	"Chapter 65"	5 June 2017	1.60
Dave tells John that Santamaría stole the money he had hidden in Villa Antigua. Dave meets Mena and he agrees to help.
66	66	"Chapter 66"	6 June 2017	1.57
Yolanda goes to buy John's plane and discovers that the salesman is one of his gunmen. Santamaría discovers that his lair was stolen.
67	67	"Chapter 67"	7 June 2017	1.62
John fired his brother for the last time in the pantheon. Santamaría is beaten and locked up by John's men.
68	68	"Chapter 68"	8 June 2017	1.42
Yolanda and Zulima travel together to Colombia to complete a business. John broadcasts the video of Senator Sinisterra next to Óscar when announcing his triumph in the presidential elections.
69	69	"Chapter 69"	9 June 2017	1.47
Dave and Mena unite to attack the barracks of El Cártel de las Sombras. Dave reveals to Mena that Zulima murdered Amanda.
70	70	"Chapter 70"	12 June 2017	1.50
Zulima threatens Yolanda with a gun and confesses that he hates her and that she told John that he worked for the DEA, so he tried to kill her.
71	71	"Chapter 71"	13 June 2017	1.62
John, Santamaría and Zulima come together to catch and destroy Yolanda. Dave threatens Sinisterra by denying his ties to El Cártel de las Sombras.
72	72	"Chapter 72"	14 June 2017	1.48
Zulima reveals to John and Santamaría the place where El Cartel de las Sombras has kidnapped Yolanda's aunt. Sinisterra orders the murder of Sonia.
73	73	"Chapter 73"	15 June 2017	1.43
Rosalba tries to escape from El Cartel de las Sombras, but is recaptured. Sinisterra's wife blames him for the murder of his son.
74	74	"Chapter 74"	16 June 2017	1.36
Zulima has intimacy with Santamaría. Sinisterra's wife decides to stay with Mena's baby.
75	75	"Chapter 75"	19 June 2017	1.46
Dave visits Mónica in jail and discovers that hatred invaded his heart. Thanks to Wilmer, Santamaría learns that Sinisterra's wife has Amanda's baby.
76	76	"Chapter 76"	20 June 2017	1.59
Sinisterra suffers for the death of his wife, who is killed by Santamaría. Estela, Mena and Dave save Yolanda from the kidnapping of Santamaría.
77	77	"Chapter 77"	21 June 2017	1.56
Zulima meets Liz's friend in jail and lies to protect her. A prison police officer believes that Yolanda is not the baby's true mother.
78	78	"Chapter 78"	22 June 2017	1.51
Rosalba visits Yolanda to tell her that Dave and Mena will get her out of jail. Santamaría corrupts a custody of the penalty to enter for Yolanda.
79	79	"Chapter 79"	23 June 2017	1.45
Yolanda encloses Santamaría in a cell and Mónica informs the authorities that she is a fugitive. Yolanda sets a trap for Sinisterra to demonstrate her links to drug trafficking.
80	80	"Chapter 80"	26 June 2017	1.83
Sinisterra agrees to work with the police to catch John and other drug traffickers. John kills all cartel members to own everything.
