= La Piloto season 2 =

La Piloto
- Season 2
- Promotional poster
- Starring: Livia Brito; Arap Bethke; Juan Colucho; María de la Fuente; Margarita Muñoz; Oka Giner; Ilza Ponko; Tommy Vásquez; Stephanie Salas; Lisardo; Mauricio Aspe; Paulo Quevedo; Juan Vidal; Julia Urbini; Mauricio Pimentel; Nico Galán; Julio Echeverry
- No. of episodes: 82

Release
- Original network: Las Estrellas
- Original release: 18 June – 7 October 2018

Season chronology
- ← Previous; Season 1

The second and final season of the American television series La Piloto created by Jörg Hiller premiered in Mexico on 18 June 2018 and concluded on 7 October 2018, unlike the previous season that premiered on Univision, this season premiered on Las Estrellas.

== Cast ==
=== Main ===
- Livia Brito as Yolanda Cadena
- Arap Bethke as John Lucio
- Juan Colucho as Dave Mejía
- María de la Fuente as Mónica Ortega
- Margarita Muñoz as Andrea Pulido
- Oka Giner as Olivia Nieves
- Ilza Ponko as Irina Kilichenko
- Tommy Vásquez as Arnoldo Santamaría
- Stephanie Salas as Rosalba Cadena
- Lisardo as Vasily Kilichenko
- Mauricio Aspe as Arley Mena
- Paulo Quevedo as Bill Morrison
- Juan Vidal as Bastián Regueros
- Julia Urbini as Felicidad
- Mauricio Pimentel as Muñeco
- Nico Galán as Wilmer Aguilar
- Julio Echeverry as Gilberto Pulido

=== Recurring ===
- Diego Escalona as Arley Junior
- Verónica Montes as Lizbeth Álvarez
- Aroa Gimeno as Ana San Miguel
- Mikael Lacko as Tony Waters
- Rodrigo Massa as Aldo Tapia

== Production ==
=== Casting ===
This season they do not have the participation of María Fernanda Yepes, Alejandro Nones, Verónica Montes, and Arturo Barba who were part of the main cast of the previous season. Macarena Achaga, who played Olivia, was replaced by actress Oka Giner, due to Achaga's health problems. In this season new actors were integrated such as Ilza Ponko who will play the main villain, Margarita Muñoz, Paulo Quevedo, Oka Giner, Mikael Lacko, Julio Echeverry, Lisardo, and Mauricio Pimentel, returning cast from previous seasons of the series include: Livia Brito as the titular character, Arap Bethke, Tommy Vásquez, Juan Colucho, Stephanie Salas, María de la Fuente, and Nico Galán.

== Episodes ==
No. overall	No. in season	Title	Original air date	Mexico viewers (millions)
81	1	"Santamaría secuestra a Arley"	18 June 2018	5.5
Yolanda visits John in jail and demands that he stay away from her because her life has changed and she is happy. Yolanda decides to take Arley Jr. to Mexico City and in mid-flight he is kidnapped by Colonel Santamaría. Yolanda is desperate not knowing where her son is and asks for Dave's help so the police can find him.
82	2	"Los Kilichenko contratan a Santamaría"	19 June 2018	2.6
Yolanda discovers that Santamaría kidnapped Arley. Monica helps Santamaría escape from prison and takes him to her boss, a drug dealer associated with the Russian mafia. Vasily Kilichenko offers Colonel Santamaría to belong to his criminal organization. Santamaría agrees to be his new security chief and begins his revenge against Yolanda. Santamaría sets a trap for Yolanda and Dave and takes them to an empty port.
83	3	"John mata a un hombre en la cárcel"	20 June 2018	2.7
Santamaría burns the house of Yolanda and Dave, but they manage to escape. John's lawyer refuses to continue working with him because he has not paid him and leaves when John needs him most. John gets tired of Moreno's provocations and confronts him. In the fight John ends up killing him and hides the body before the guards find out.
84	4	"Yolanda piensa en John para atrapar a la mafia rusa"	21 June 2018	2.7
John loses his chance to get out of jail for murdering Salvador Moreno. Santamaría finds a note in the armament box saying that the weapons have locators. Dave's boss dies in an explosion caused by Santamaría. Dave is frustrated by his failure to capture The Kilichenco and Yolanda mentions that John could help them.
85	5	"Andrea recibe una advertencia de Los Kilichenko"	22 June 2018	2.6
Irina learns that Andrea has missed her job at the club and sends her men to hurt her father. The colonel kills Lizbeth and Raul, leaving Yolanda devastated. Dave looks for John to get information about the Kilichenko, but he refuses to help him without receiving anything in return.
86	6	"Dave libera a John Lucio"	25 June 2018	2.3
Dave reaches an agreement with the State's Attorney and obtains John Lucio's conditional release in exchange for cooperating with the law and giving information about the Kilichenco. Olivia is very upset to meet John at the house. Andrea faints in the bathroom and Wilmer saves her. Bill discovers that Yolanda's house was set on fire and plans to tell Solano.
87	7	"Santamaría al borde de la muerte"	26 June 2018	2.5
John helps Dave catch one of Irina's and Vasily's men for information. Due to the shots of Yolanda, Santamaría is badly hurt and needs to receive a kidney transplant urgently. Irina moves her men to get a donor as soon as possible. Vasily demands Santamaría to stay away from Irina or he will not save his life.
88	8	"Waters impide que Dave haga su trabajo"	27 June 2018	2.6
John identifies a man from the Kilincheko gang and Dave chases him through the airport. They capture him, but Waters murders him on the way to the DEA and makes up a fake shooting, on the orders of Irina, to prevent Dave from questioning him for information about the Russians.
89	9	"El Muñeco abusa de Mónica"	28 June 2018	2.3
Rosalba senses that the nun she found at the airport was Lieutenant Ortega, leading to suspicions throughout the whole group on Monica's allegiance. Meanwhile at the Nogales ranch, El Muñeco gets drunk and rapes Monica.
90	10	"Dave y John se enfrentan a golpes"	29 June 2018	2.0
Dave becomes jealous after seeing John leave Yolanda's room in the night. He advises John to stay away from Yolanda. John remembers a warehouse but it's a dead end. Desperate for not getting useful information, Dave and John have an argument and they both end up fighting with one another.
91	11	"John y Yolanda desconfían de Mónica"	2 July 2018	2.4
Monica manipulates Dave to get her a visa to travel to Los Angeles, both John and Yolanda distrust her and believe that she can be on the side of the Kilichenko.
92	12	"Irina secuestra a John Lucio"	3 July 2018	2.7
Irina responds to Lucio's call and plan to meet him in a hotel, Dave and Yolanda accompany him without raising suspicion, but Irina manages to kidnap him by making everyone believe that John escaped. John talks to Irina and asks her for a job but to no avail as Irina says that she already has a pilot. She later dumps him on the dock, where Dave and Yolanda are searching for him because they tracked his ankle bracelet. John has the opportunity to escape but he doesn't as he claims to himself that he will get Yolanda back and help her find Arley because he promised her that.
93	13	"Andrea encuentra a Irina y Santamaría"	4 July 2018	2.6
Yolanda has new hope to find Arley after Andrea confessed that she works as a dancer in a nightclub run by the Kilichenko.
94	14	"El plan de Mónica falla y escapa con Santamaría"	5 July 2018	2.6
Monica tries to poison El Muneco before she goes to Los Angeles but she fails and accidentally kills Pellares. Yolanda receives Monica at the airport and notices that she carries a weapon. The plan to go to the security house is canceled and Santamaría's men provoke a shooting at the airport. They fake a kidnapping where they make Yolanda and the gang believe they are kidnapping Monica, when instead it's all planned and Monica is in on it. Dave and another DEA agent both confirm that Waters is associated with the Russian gang as word of Dave's fake safehouse location is leaked to only Waters. Dave is held at gunpoint by the Russian mafia but turns the table on them to no end as the Russian kills himself before giving information. John hijacks a car with a passenger to follow Monica and Santamaria but is later arrested because of it.
95	15	"Wilmer es enviado al club de los Kilichenko"	6 July 2018	2.9
A new plan arises to find the Kilichenko and Wilmer offers to enter as an infiltrator to the club where Andrea works. Olivia fears that Wilmer will get hurt and confesses that she kissed Morrison.
96	16	"Morrison es despedido de US FLY y se venga de Yolanda"	9 July 2018	2.5
The new plan is set to go to White Velvet and capture Irina, Waters and Santamaria. Will and Andrea are still inside the club when a hostage situation arises and the plan goes off when Wilmer is discovered by Irina. Dave and the police have the Russians cornered but the Russians and Irina say that if they come in, they will kill all the hostages. Sanatamaria refuses to save Irina and leaves her in that situation until Vasily asks Santamaria to rescue her and Santamaria imposes his own conditions. Irina manages to escape in an ambulance but Yolanda gets on the ambulance as well, and John is right behind them. Bill is fired from the airline by Regueros and decides to take revenge on Yolanda by calling Solano to let him know that Arley Jr. was kidnapped.
97	17	"Santamaría condiciona a Vasily Kilichenko"	10 July 2018	2.7
After rescuing Irina, Santamaría speaks head-on with Vasily Kilichenko demanding authority and respect. Vasily lowers his guard, but secretly commands the colonel to watch.
98	18	"Olivia consigue interrogar a Morrison"	11 July 2018	2.7
Morrison confesses to Olivia the resentment he has towards Yolanda. Olivia asks him to make an exception and help her identify a pilot who may have clues about Arley.
99	19	"Santamaría y Waters atentan contra la vida de Dave"	12 July 2018	2.5
Dave faces Waters and they discuss their relationship with the Kilichenko. The colonel is responsible for sabotaging Mejía's car and when driving he crashes into a truck, leaving him seriously injured.
100	20	"Rosalba mata a Garza y salva la vida de John"	13 July 2018	2.4
Lucio manages to capture the Kilichenko’s pilot and takes him to the safe house. Rosalba sees that John's life is in danger and shoots Garza.
101	21	"Regueros le da una segunda oportunidad a Yolanda"	16 July 2018	2.3
After the show that Yolanda starred in, Regueros decides to defend her and give her another chance. Yolanda could not tell him the truth, but she promises that she will not do anything to discredit US FLY.
102	22	"Morrison intenta entrar a la organización de los Kilichenko"	17 July 2018	2.8
Morrison is put to the test to prove he is a good pilot and that he deserves to be part of the Kilichenko organization. Bill meets Arley and exposes the great hatred he feels for Yolanda.
103	23	"Andrea le confiesa su amor a Wilmer"	18 July 2018	2.8
Andrea can not bear to see Wilmer suffer for Olivia and confesses that she has been in love with him for a long time. Their romantic moment is interrupted when a man from Santamaría tries to capture them.
104	24	"John es el nuevo piloto de los Kilichenko"	19 July 2018	2.5
Irina accepts John in the organization and offers him the position of pilot. Santamaría is surprised to see Lucio again and suspects that his hiring can bring him many problems.
105	25	"Morrison acepta trabajar para Santamaría"	20 July 2018	2.9
Santamaría forgives Morrison's life in exchange for him getting the address of the security house where Yolanda hides.
106	26	"Irina desea a John y engaña a Santamaría"	23 July 2018	2.5
Irina can not help being attracted to John and ends up asking him to have fun together in secret of Colonel Santamaría.
107	27	"Mónica y Muñeco secuestran un avión"	24 July 2018	2.5
Olivia manages to identify Mónica and gives Yolanda notice, Muñeco is afraid to go to jail and decides to kidnap the passengers of the plane giving Santamaría time to put together a rescue plan.
108	28	"Santamaría va al rescate de Muñeco y Mónica"	25 July 2018	2.6
The colonel prepares an air rescue and with the help of John they face the police. Monica and Muñeco manage to get off the plane, but Yolanda does not stop and chases them along with Dave.
109	29	"Santamaría planea eliminar a Vasily Kilichenko"	26 July 2018	2.8
Santamaría lies to Irina telling her that John turned out to be an infiltrator and escaped. The colonel's plan changes and now he will not only destroy Yolanda but will take Vasily Kilichenko out of his way.
110	30	"Arley logra escapar"	27 July 2018	2.6
Arley manages to escape and takes Irina's cell phone so that Julia can ask Yolanda for help. With the call for help, Wilmer gets the location of the house where they are being held.
111	31	"Yolanda y Arley se reencuentran"	30 July 2018	2.8
Arley is taken to a hospital and Yolanda is reunited with him. Santamaría tries to capture them again, but this time Dave manages to protect them.
112	32	"Irina quiere vengar la muerte de su padre"	31 July 2018	2.8
Santamaría convinces Irina that John was the cause of her father's death. As revenge, she decides to investigate Yolanda's past and destroy her new life.
113	33	"Yolanda es despedida de USFLY"	1 August 2018	2.7
Yolanda's turbulent past is exposed to the media and Regueros learns that his star pilot had ties to drug trafficking.
114	34	"Dave es arrestado"	2 August 2018	2.6
Waters returns to his position as director in the DEA and gives the order to arrest Dave, blames him for treason and complicity with the Russian mafia.
115	35	"John cumplirá su condena en México"	3 August 2018	2.8
John is transferred to Mexico and is informed that he will pay his sentence in a maximum security prison. Yolanda escapes with Arley, but Matallana sends an alert for the police to capture her.
116	36	"Yolanda intenta cruzar la frontera"	6 August 2018	2.8
The police sends an alert to trap Yolanda for the kidnapping of Arley. The pilot is in trouble and decides to cross the border into Mexico through the tunnel used by the Colonel and the Kilichenko.
117	37	"Irina hace una ceremonia para despedir a Vasily"	7 August 2018	2.4
Irina receives the ashes of her father and decides to pay him a tribute at the Diablo Club. The ceremony is interrupted by Felicidad and Irina ends up punishing her.
118	38	"Mena reaparece para ayudar a Yolanda"	8 August 2018	2.6
Yolanda arrives with Arley at Rosalba's house without knowing that Buitre is about to attack them, Mena reappears and protects them to avoid being captured.
119	39	"Dave termina con Yolanda"	9 August 2018	2.6
Mejía is left without the protection of the prosecutor and his lawyer advises him to plead guilty. Knowing that he will spend a lot of time in prison, Dave ends up with Yolanda and he does it cruelly.
120	40	"John hace un trato para obtener su libertad"	10 August 2018	2.7
John talks to judge Corona and he offers him a deal to get out of jail. Lucio agrees to pay 1 million dollars in exchange for his conditional release.
121	41	"Irina y Santamaría compran USFLY"	13 August 2018	2.7
Morrison returns victorious to USFLY and regains his pilot job. Now Irina and the Colonel have a new business to hide the organization.
122	42	"John sale de la cárcel y busca a Wilmer"	14 August 2018	2.6
John is placed on probation so he can get the money he promised the judge. Lucio communicates with Wilmer to help him solve his problem.
123	43	"Santamaría le pone un alto a Regueros"	15 August 2018	2.5
Santamaría speaks directly to Regueros and threatens him with death if he gets involved in the affairs of the new administration of USFLY.
124	44	"Mónica se hace cargo de Dave"	16 August 2018	2.8
Dave wakes up in a cell and Monica explains that he has a severe health problem, which needs to be treated urgently or else he will die. Felicidad challenges Irina to fight in the death ring and unfortunately she is left badly wounded.
125	45	"John quiere recuperar su dinero"	17 August 2018	2.3
With the help of Yolanda and Wilmer, John arrives at the Cielito Lindo to look for the money that he and his brother Óscar hid.
126	46	"Olivia denuncia a John con la policía"	20 August 2018	2.5
Olivia accepts the help of Morrison and is annoyed with Wilmer when finding out that Lucio found his money, full of hate threatens to denounce John so that he returns to jail and then gives a call to the Federal Police.
127	47	"Yolanda se entera que Mónica secuestró a Dave"	21 August 2018	2.5
Andrea informs Yolanda that Monica was the person who hired the lawyer San Miguel to take Dave's case. She was the only one who knew everything about the transfer to jail. The lawyer Flores is saved by Mena after Santamaria and Buitre leave. Lucio shares the money with Wilmer and Yolanda. Wilmer later sees Santamaria in the plane to Los Angeles without being seen by Santamaria.
128	48	"John sigue amando a Yolanda y le pide una oportunidad"	22 August 2018	2.4
Mena tells John that he should talk about his feelings with Yolanda. After the talk John decides to help Yolanda. Santamaría arrives at the Los Angeles airport wearing a captain's USFly uniform and gets into a van. Wilmer follows Santamaría and tells a policeman to follow the van. Matallana visits Regueros to ask about Santamaría and his uniform. Santamaría asks Waters why Matallana hasn't been killed yet. With the protection of Mena and Lucio, the pilot prepares to rescue Dave and face Mónica.
129	49	"Mónica recibe la orden de capturar a Buitre"	23 August 2018	2.5
Santamaría asks Mónica to capture Buitre but the situation gets out of control and Dave helps Monica to control it. They manage to subdue him and they capture him in a cell.
130	50	"Waters intenta acabar con Matallana"	24 August 2018	2.3
Finally detective Matallana realizes that Waters is on the side of the Kilichenko and seeks the help of Wilmer and Andrea to unmask him. Dave makes a deal with Buitre so that both can leave alive from the hands of Mónica and Santamaría.
131	51	"Yolanda y John compran una avioneta para rescatar a Dave"	27 August 2018	2.3
John buys a plane to go to Nogales in search of Dave. Yolanda leaves the safety of Arley and Rosalba in Mena's hands.
132	52	"Mena le confiesa a Arley que es su padre"	28 August 2018	2.4
Despite Rosalba's warnings, Mena talks to Arley and confesses that they carry the same blood. Arley rejects him for having abandoned him and being a man who is dedicated to killing. Felicidad risks her life while trying to escape from the desert hunt.
133	53	"Irina se entera que Santamaría dio la orden para matar a Vasily"	29 August 2018	2.6
Irina discovers Dave at the farm and he confesses that Vasily died on Santamaría's orders. To prevent her from killing him, Mejía asks her to make an alliance and together destroy the colonel.
134	54	"Yolanda y John retoman su amor"	30 August 2018	2.4
The police offers reward for information to locate Yolanda and John. Faced with the risk of being caught, John approaches Yolanda to give her security and show his love.
135	55	"Santamaría y los rusos planean un ataque terrorista"	31 August 2018	2.4
Lola and Felicidad warn of a terrorist attack by the Russians and are discovered communicating with Wilmer and now their lives are in danger. Wilmer gives notice to Matallana to alert all the police.
136	56	"Morrison y Waters le juran lealtad a Santamaría"	3 September 2018	2.5
Santamaría fears for his life, so he asks Morrison and Waters for help to fight the great army of Irina Kilichenko. They swear loyalty and promise to help him kill her.
137	57	"Felicidad finge su muerte y escapa del Club Diablo"	4 September 2018	2.5
Felicidad and her partners are forced to fight in the ring of death. As planned, she makes everyone believe that she died in combat and Venancio orders her body to be thrown into the desert. When Arley is attacked by classmates, Mena and Rosalba have opposing views regarding the use of violence by a child.
138	58	"Irina y Santamaría se enfrentan"	5 September 2018	2.9
Irina finally decides to end the life of Santamaría by giving him a powerful sedative to kill him slowly. The plan turns out badly and Santamaría counterattacks by hitting her with all his strength. Morrison tries to divert suspicions of Andrea and Wilmer regarding the Russian passengers of the plane he was piloting by accusing Regueros of being associated with the Kilichenkos. Yolanda and John successfully escape an ambush after receiving a warning message from Dave.
139	59	"Santamaría tiene un nuevo enemigo"	6 September 2018	2.2
Irina tries to seduce Waters to escape but he ends up subduing her. Santamaría arrives at the Black Leather and discovers that all his men were killed. Waters suspects Mejía, but the colonel has a bad feeling. Santamaría decides to take Irina to the Club Diablo. Wilmer and Andrea arrive at the club after seeing a TV news report and are interrogated by Waters who afterwards requests a subordinate to follow them. While walking in the desert, Felicidad sees a helicopter passing by.
140	60	"Irina se convierte en una esclava del Club Diablo"	7 September 2018	2.4
Santamaría takes control of Club Diablo and puts Irina to work as a sex slave. Venancio and all the Kilichenko guards are forced to bow to the colonel. Yolanda and John escape from the ranch where they have noticed the absence of Mónica and Dave. Dave gives an anonymous warning to the Mexican police about the Russian terrorists intending to use Novichok. Santamaría is informed by Waters about Wilmer's presence earlier at the ex-White Velvet club. Wilmer's wife notifies him about Morrison's lies regarding the flight assigned to him. Felicidad waits for Santamaría and Morrison to return to the helicopter and threatens to shoot them.
141	61	"Felicidad acepta ser novia de Santamaría"	10 September 2018	2.7
To save his life, Santamaría manipulates Felicidad by telling her that he is the only one who knows where her mother is. Felicidad accepts the colonel's conditions and becomes his new girlfriend.
142	62	"Mena es detenido por la policía"	11 September 2018	2.7
Mena notices the presence of the police and asks Rosalba to escape with Arley. Waters gives the order to stop him and say the whereabouts of Yolanda.
143	63	"Vasily está vivo y busca venganza"	12 September 2018	2.7
Waters is attacked by surprise and realizes that Vasily Kilichenko survived the White Velvet fire.
144	64	"Dave le pide una oportunidad a Santamaría"	13 September 2018	2.7
After saving Colonel's life, Dave and Monica are interrogated to see if they are loyal to the organization. Santamaría puts Mejía to the test, since he doubts his sudden change of side. Santamaría relies on Dave and Lieutenant Monica and accepts that Dave starts working in his organization.
145	65	"Rosalba y Arley son detenidos por la policía"	14 September 2018	2.7
The police of Tepic manages to intercept Rosalba and Arley before being able to meet Yolanda. Mena refuses to lose his son and plans to escape from prison to rescue him.
146	66	"Yolanda le pide ayuda al Lic. Flores para rescatar a Arley"	17 September 2018	2.5
Yolanda must appeal to Flores to prevent Rosalba from going to jail and Arley to be deported. Flores believes that the rescue is dangerous, but agrees to help the pilot.
147	67	"Yoladna evita que Santamaría se lleve de nuevo a Arley"	18 September 2018	2.6
Dave warns Yolanda that Santamaría will try to kidnap Arley again. With this information, Yolanda anticipates and provokes a shooting to alert the police.
148	68	"Wilmer es secuestrado por Waters"	19 September 2018	2.5
Wilmer tries to hack the US FLY system, but is discovered by Waters. Olivia manages to hide and gives notice to agent Chávez so that the police rescue him before he is murdered.
149	69	"Rosalba es brutalmente golpeada en la cárcel"	20 September 2018	2.9
Lic. Flores tries to see Rosalba, but is notified that she suffered an accident. The boss Leon realizes that Flores can be his contact to catch Yolanda and sends a guard to watch over him.
150	70	"Vasily se enfrenta a Mónica y Dave"	21 September 2018	2.6
Vasily attacks the Nogales ranch by surprise and tortures Mónica to obtain information about Irina. Yolanda is contacted from the prison where Rosalba and is demanded that she and John surrender to the police. Arnoldo requests Waters to get information from the captured Wilmer and Ana. Waters begins to torture Ana by electrocution and punches Wilmer. Olivia is informed by Chavez regarding the arrest warrant for Regueros. Olivia and Estefania try to get information from Regueros. Arley is sent to an adoptive family.
151	71	"Yolanda pisa la cárcel"	24 September 2018	2.5
Yolanda says goodbye to John without telling him that she will turn herself in to the police. In order to save her aunt's life, she is allowed to be captured and admitted to the federal women's prison. Vasily negotiates with Dave and Mónica the proposal of an alliance against Arnoldo. The adoptive family notices that Arley is not happy. Arnoldo sends John a photo of an injured Wilmer that he received from Waters. Irina and Venancio are sent to fight. The prison ward says to Yolanda that she must be punished for her past crimes.
152	72	"Felicidad mata a Venancio"	25 September 2018	2.9
Felicidad does not allow Venancio to speak ill of her and shoots him in the chest. John decides to abide by Santamaría's conditions and changes his freedom to that of Wilmer and Andrea.
153	73	"John se convierte en prisionero de Santamaría"	26 September 2018	2.9
Santamaría sees John's face and manages to surrender voluntarily. By having Lucio locked up, Monica takes the opportunity to express her hatred and the desire to kill him.
154	74	"Santamaría descubre que Olivia y Morrison son pareja"	27 September 2018	2.8
Santamaría discovers that Morrison hid his love affair with Olivia. As punishment, the colonel sends his men to capture him and is discharged from the organization. Morrison asks Olivia to tell him what she is hiding but Olivia faces him and tells him that she already knows that he works with Santamaría.
155	75	"John y Mena toman de rehén a Mónica"	28 September 2018	2.8
Mena lets himself be captured on purpose in order to arrive with Lucio. By being together they manage to escape, they subdue Mónica and take control of the ranch.
156	76	"Vasily rescata a Irina del Club Diablo"	1 October 2018	2.7
Vasily mocks the security of Club Diablo and manages to reach Irina. With the help of a secret tunnel they escape to the desert, hoping to join Dave and beat Santamaría. Felicidad listens to Morrison when he confesses to Santamaría that he found Julia in Andrea's apartment. Felicidad decides to go find her mother and manages to escape.
157	77	"Dave llega a la hacienda para ayudar a John y Mena"	2 October 2018	2.6
John and Mena are cornered in Nogales, but Dave arrives to help them. Indio realizes that Mejía always lied and immediately gives notice to Santamaría. Mónica is detained by the police after being denounced by the people who had been kidnapped in the hacienda.
158	78	"Los Kilichenco y Dave se preparan para atacar a Santamaría"	3 October 2018	2.6
Vasily and Irina meet with Dave to plan the attack against Santamaría. The Kilichenko have the great idea of reaching the Club Diablo during the maximum event that commemorates the Day of the Dead. Yolanda puts a trap to director Domínguez so her aunt and she can be released.
159	79	"Yolanda y Mónica se ven cara a cara en la cárcel"	4 October 2018	2.6
Santamaría decides not to help Mónica and leaves her to her fate in prison. The boss León proposes to Mónica to unite to end the life of Yolanda.
160	80	"John rescata a Yolanda"	5 October 2018	2.7
Yolanda takes advantage of the fact that the inmates set up a riot and calls John to execute her rescue plan. Lucio arrives with a helicopter and manages to take Yolanda with her aunt Rosalba.
161	81	"Yolanda se reencuentra con Dave y se preparan para la batalla"	7 October 2018	2.9
162	82	"John y Dave matan a Santamaría"	7 October 2018	2.9
The Kilichenko decide to go alone to Club Diablo and face Dave. Yolanda, John and Mena arrive in Nogales and prepare for the battle with Colonel Santamaría. Yolanda pursues the Colonel throughout the desert to rescue Arley. John and Dave arrive as reinforcement and end the life of Santamaría.
