= Descontrol (TV series) =

- Genre: Drama
- Composers: Carlos Marmo; Agustín Barreto; Ricardo Pons; Marcos Campo
- Country of origin: United States
- Original language: Spanish
- No. of seasons: 1
- No. of episodes: 20

Production
- Executive producer: Patricio Wills
- Editor: Víctor Manuel Ruíz
- Camera setup: Multi-camera
- Production companies: W Studios; Lemon Studios

Original release
- Network: Univision
- Release: 7 January – 4 February 2018 (Note: Seven episodes of Descontrol aired during its original broadcast on Univision. The remaining episodes were released on Vix beginning 28 September 2023.)

Descontrol: Desgracias con gracia, or simply Descontrol, is an American anthology television series produced by W Studios and Lemon Studios for Univision. It premiered on 7 January 2018.

== Notable guest stars ==
- Livia Brito
- Eduardo Santamarina
- Carlos Espejel
- Mariluz Bermúdez
- Laisha Wilkins
- Alejandro Nones
- Shalim Ortiz
- Rodrigo Vidal
- Marjorie de Sousa

== Episodes ==
The episodes are ordered below according to the order on Vix, and not their broadcast order.

No.	Title	Directed by	Written by	Original release date	US viewers (millions)
1	"Postre"	Caros Bolado	Carlos Wasserman	28 January 2018	0.74
Sergio feels unhappy and believes that when he divorces his life will have a change. The day that Sergio is reunited with Alfredo, an old friend, the resentments of the past come to the surface and tries to show him that he can be better than his friend has always been. Cast: Harry Geithner as Sergio, Ramiro Fumazoni as Alfredo, Fabián Pizzorno, Ceci Ponce, Gema Garoa, Sofía De LLaca, and Patricio Fernández
2	"Todo queda en familia"	Carlos Bolado	Diego Chalela Arango	19 October 2023 (Vix)	N/A
Cast: Eduardo Santamarina, Marco de León, María Rebeca, Jessica Ortiz, Andrés Durán, Arnulfo Reyes, Jorge Nava, Luis José Sevilla, Vania Aguayo
3	"O Negativo"	David Ruiz	Daniela Richer Figueroa	12 October 2023 (Vix)	N/A
Cast: José Carlos Femat, Mauricio Aspe, Ana Ochoa, Eugenio Bartilotti, Xavier Cervantes, Geraldine Zinat, Jaqueline Rojo, Guadalupe Martínez, Teresa Selma
4	"Creta"	Carlos González Sariñana	Carlos Wasserman	21 January 2018	0.84
Miguel's love for Ariadna becomes a confused obsession and he kidnaps her to have her by his side. The situation takes an unexpected turn when Miguel confesses to Ariadna a secret about Teo, her husband. Cast: Marjorie de Sousa as Ariadna, Rodrigo Vidal as Miguel, José María Galeano as Teo, Andrés Zuno, and José Alberto Suárez
5	"La niñera"	David Ruiz	Carlos Andrés Morelli	19 October 2023 (Vix)	N/A
Cast: Irán Castillo, Eileen Moreno, Shaula Satinka, Rebeca Gucón, Andrés Delgado, Hugo Catalán, Alan Téllez
6	"Romerito"	Joe Rendón	Marisel Lloberas	7 January 2018	0.82
Walter suffers from work-related harassment on the part of his colleagues and boss, who call him "Romerito". One day, Walter, tired of the taunts, threatens everyone with detonating a bomb if they do not do what he tells them to do. Cast: Carlos Espejel as Walter Romero, Juan Vidal, Mariluz Bermúdez as Diana, Pablo Astiazarán, Santiago Centeno, Antonio Monroy, Luis Fernando Zárate, Moisés Cardez, and Isidro Vargas
7	"Ringtone"	David Ruiz	Luis Miguel Rivas Granada	7 January 2018	0.66
The secrets of a family come to light during the wake of their father. The situation gets out of control when the family confronts the mistress and her daughter. Cast: Laisha Wilkins, Mikael Lacko as Juan, Ana Bekoa, Claudia Vega, Moisés Suárez, Rafa Simón, Kevin Holt, Eduardo Corona, Roberto Tello, María Elena Aguilar, Antonio Arias, Darío Palacio, Eduardo Bravo, Rodrigo Ostap, and Nuria Bages
8	"Wasabi"	Alejandro Lozano	Carlos Wasserman	14 January 2018	0.66
Sebastián has spent his whole life controlling his emotions, but the day he meets Jeanette, his life finds the meaning he was looking for. His first appointment at the Wasabi restaurant is the scene of Sebastian's transformation. Cast: Sara Corrales as Jeanette, Nico Galán as Sebastián, Víctor Alfredo Jiménez, Aarón Balderi, Roberto Duarte, and Louis David Horné
9	"Estimados padres"	Joe Rendón	Sabrina Farji	5 October 2023 (Vix)	N/A
Cast: Rossana Nájera, Alejandro Ávila, Pascacio López, Regina Rojas, Enrique Galván, Marcela Morett, Rodrigo Magaña, Emiliano Castro, Gabo Anguiano
10	"Call Center"	Carlos González Sariñana	Juan Carlos Aparicio Schlesinger	14 January 2018	0.92
José receives a call from Marco, who calls from a call center to sell him the trip of his dreams. José accepts Marco's promotion without knowing that that call would make them lose control of their lives. Cast: Shalim Ortiz as José, Luis Curiel as Marco, Cristina Zulueta, Ari Gallegos, Ivana De María, Roger Cudney, Adolfo Argudín, Sebastián Moncayo, Camila Acosta, Luis Xavier, Nuridia Briseño, Any Baquero, Jorge Badillo, and Lorenzo Davis
11	"Concierto de despedida"	Carlos Cock	Carlos Wasserman	4 February 2018	0.59
It is the reunion of 'La Premonitions' and the ego of three women, the envy of the past, a love deception and the female complexes explode in full backstage causing the concert to be a total chaos. Cast: Giselle Blondet, Stephanie Salas, Marcela Carvajal, Martín Karpan, Gustavo Ángel, and Andrés Ruiz
12	"Despedida de soltero"	David Ruiz	Juan Carlos Aparicio Schlesinger	19 October 2023 (Vix)	N/A
Cast: Santiago Ramundo, Luciano Zacharski, Julián Caicedo, Abril Schreiber, Katherine Castrillón, Diana Sanders, Luces Velásquez, Rosa Garavito, Edgar Durán, Leidy Orozco, Miguel Ángel Chaparro, Charles Tarjet, Vanessa Brown, Mildre Gutierrez, Erika La Rotta, Vanessa Simonelle
13	"Diligencia ninja"	Carlos González Sariñana	Juan Carlos Aparicio Schlesinger	5 October 2023 (Vix)	N/A
Cast: Arap Bethke, María Claudia Torres, Federico Rivera, Iván Carvajal, Darío Acosta, Makoto Hirairi
14	"La perra de Luis"	Carlos González Sariñana	Daniela Richer Figueroa	12 October 2023 (Vix)	N/A
Cast: Aylín Mújica, Lucho Velasco, Sandra Reyes, Juliana Gómez, Carlos Gutierrez, Luz Mary Baquero, Andrés Barrera, Angélica León
15	"¡Adivina quién viene!"	Luis Carlos Sierra	Juan Carlos Aparicio Schlesinger	12 October 2023 (Vix)	N/A
Cast: Juan Colucho, Ana Lucía Domínguez, Kristina Lilley, Carolina Cuervo, Adriano Márquez, Vicente Gómez
16	"Match perfecto"	David Ruiz	Juan Carlos Aparicio Schlesinger	28 September 2023 (Vix)	N/A
Cast: Livia Brito as Eugenia, Jonathan Islas, Laura Perico, Daniela Tapia, Ricardo Henao, Mauricio Montoya, Johan Méndez, Sebastián Palacio, Ian Valencia, Wilson Vargas, Edwin Rodriguez
17	"Ojo por ojo"	Luis Carlos Sierra	Sandra Arriagada	19 October 2023 (Vix)	N/A
Cast: Anna Silvetti, Flor Vargas, Rosemary Bohórquez, Clemencia Velásquez, Diana Sanders, Patricia Tamayo, Iván Orjuela, Juancho Arango, Juan Rodríguez, Alfredo Aguilar, Leonardo Marmolejo
18	"Plato del día"	Carlos González Sariñana	Daniela Richer Figueroa	19 October 2023 (Vix)	N/A
Cast: Fabiola Guajardo, Kimberly Reyes, Alejandro García, María Cristina, Galvis, Laura Di Pietro, César Cabezas, Tatiana Leal, Yurima Navarro
19	"Veinte años"	David Ruiz	Marisel Lloberas	5 October 2023 (Vix)	N/A
Cast: María Fernanda García, Jéssica Mas, Javier Delguidice, Juanita Humar, María Teresa Carrasco, Raúl Ramírez
20	"Rudeza innecesaria"	Carlos Cock	Daniela Richer Figueroa	12 October 2023 (Vix)	N/A
Cast: María de la Fuente, Natalia Ramírez, Ernesto Calzadilla, José Daniel Cristancho, María Camila Giraldo, Adriana Silva, María Irene Toro, Andrés Carvajal, Mila Villamizar

== Production ==
The series was announced on 14 July 2017. Production of the series began on 13 November 2017 in Bogotá, Colombia.

== Release ==
The series premiered on Univision on 7 January 2018. After airing seven episodes, the series was pulled for unknown reasons. On 28 September 2023, Vix began streaming the series, including unaired episodes, with five episodes released weekly.

== Ratings ==
Viewership and ratings per season of Descontrol
Season	Timeslot (ET)	Episodes	First aired		Last aired		Avg. viewers (millions)
Season	Timeslot (ET)	Episodes	Date	Viewers (millions)	Date	Viewers (millions)	Avg. viewers (millions)
1	Sunday 9pm/8c	7	7 January 2018	0.82	4 February 2018	0.59	0.75
