= Sex Express Coffee =

2010 film

Sex express coffee
- Directed by: Óscar González
- Starring: Ricardo Bonno; Fernando Consagra; Diego de Erice; María de la Fuente; Plutarco Haza; Mateo Lynch
- Release date: 25 May 2010; (Mexico)
- Running time: 87 min.
- Country: Mexico
- Language: Spanish

Sex express coffee is a 2010 Mexican thriller film directed by Óscar González.

== Cast ==
- Fernando Consagra
- Ricardo Bonno
- Mateo Lynch
- Plutarco Haza
- Diego de Erice
- María de la Fuente
