= Arap Bethke =

Mexican actor

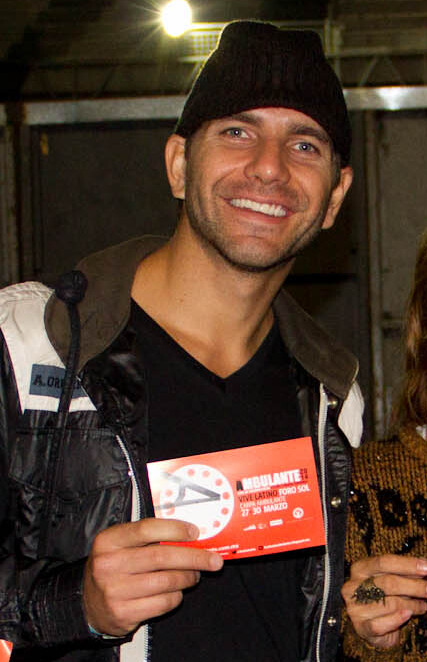
- Born: Ricardo Arap Bethke Galdames; 12 March 1980 (age 46); Nairobi, Kenya
- Education: Universidad Iberoamericana
- Occupation: Actor
- Years active: 1997–present

Ricardo Arap Bethke Galdames (born 12 March 1980) is a Mexican actor.

== Early life ==
Bethke was born on 12 March 1980 in Nairobi, Kenya, as Ricardo Arap Bethke Galdames. In the Kalenjin language, "Arap Bethke" means "Bethke's son." His father, Claus Bethke is German and his mother, Patricia Galdames is Chilean. He lived in Nairobi until he was 5 years old. His father worked at the United Nations, so this caused them to move from one country to another. At a very young age, he arrived in Mexico where he lived all his childhood and adolescence. He attended high school at Peterson College. and later studied at the Universidad Iberoamericana, where he graduated with a degree in communication. He has two brothers and a sister, who was born in Washington, United States, and a brother who was born in Ecuador named Beto Bethke. Bethke speaks four languages: Spanish, English, Italian and French. Due to his upbringing, Bethke has called himself a "Mexikenian", due to his Kenyan birth and Mexican nationality.

== Career ==
Bethke played the role of "Chacho" in the telenovela Clase 406. In 2007 he appeared in the Ugly Betty episode "A Tree Grows in Guadalajara as Antonio Barreiro, a cafe waiter.

Bethke also starred in "Tierra de pasiones", and in Madre Luna as Demetrio Aguirre. He is also one of the main characters in Doña Bárbara (Telemundo series), playing the role of "Antonio Sandoval"."

Bethke has also guest-starred on the 1st season of RBD: La Familia as "Alvaro"; Dulce Maria's new hot conquest, on episode 3 "El Que Quiera Azul Celeste... Que Se Acueste!". His cast members were Alfonso Herrera, Anahí, Dulce Maria, Christopher Uckermann, Maite Perroni, and Christian Chávez, the stars of the show and the members of the Latin pop band RBD from Mexico city.

Arap currently lives in Los Angeles, California. and is engaged to actress Ivana De Maria, with whom he has been dating since 2017.

== Filmography ==
=== Film roles ===
Year	Title	Roles	Notes
1999	A Sweet Scent of Death	Lucio	Uncredited
2013	Instructions Not Included	Valentín's Lawyer	
2014	Quetzalcoatl	Warrior	Short film, also a producer
2014	Amor de mis amores	Andrea's boyfriend	
2015	Enamorándome de Abril	Fernando	
2018	Sobredosis de amor	Bruno	
2018	El minthó Escarlata	Santiago	Short film

=== Television roles ===
Year	Title	Roles	Notes
1997	Mi generación	Rodrigo	
2002–2003	Clase 406	Chacho Mendoza Cuervo	2 episodes
2005–2006	Soñar no cuesta nada	Roberto "Bobby"	
2006	Tierra de pasiones	Roberto "Beto" Contreras	
2007	Decisiones	Martín Juan Andrés	Episode: "A la tercera va la vencida" Episode: "Crema y nata"
2007	RBD: La familia	Álvaro	Episode: "El que quiera azul celeste, que se acueste"
2007	Ugly Betty	Antonio	4 episodes
2007–2008	Madre Luna	Demetrio Aguirre	Series regular; 141 episodes
2008–2009	Doña Bárbara	Antonio Sandoval	Main role; 190 episodes
2009–2010	Victorinos	Victorino Gallardo	Main role; 152 episodes
2010	Los caballeros las prefieren brutas	Manuel Carmona	Episode: "Batallas de género"
2010	La Diosa Coronada	Genaro Castilblanco	
2011–2012	El octavo mandamiento	Iván Acosta	
2012	Amor cautivo	Fernando Bustamante Arizmendi	Main role; 120 episodes
2013–2014	Corazón en condominio	Rodolfo Cortina	
2014	Señora Acero	Gabriel "Muñeco" Cruz	Recurring role (season 1); 2 episodes
2015–2016	Tanto amor	Bruno Lombardo	Main role; 117 episodes
2015–2019	Club de Cuervos	Juan Pablo Iglesias	Recurring role (seasons 1–4); 17 episodes
2016	Eva la trailera	Pablo Contreras	Main role; 118 episodes
2017–2018	La Piloto	John Lucio	Main role (seasons 1-2); 162 episodes
2018	Descontrol	Antonio	Episode: "Romerito"
2019	La usurpadora	Facundo Nava	Main role; 24 episodes
2021	Buscando a Frida	Detective Martín Cabrera	Main role; 84 episodes
2022	Mujer de nadie	Alfredo Terán	Main role; 45 episodes
2023	Juego de mentiras	César Ferrer	Main role
2024–2025	El extraño retorno de Diana Salazar	Joaquín Nuñez / Lucas de Treviño	Main role
2024	Fugitivas, en busca de la libertad	Alejandro Castillo	Main role
2025	Juegos de amor y poder	Roberto Roldán	Main role
2026	Lobo, morir matando	Damián "Lobo" Rosales	Main role
2026	Polen	Juan Mendoza	

== Awards and nominations ==
Year	Association	Nominated works	Category	Result
2016	Premios Tu Mundo	Eva la trailera	Favorite Lead Actor	Nominated
2016	Premios Tu Mundo	Eva la trailera	The Perfect Couple (with Edith González)	Nominated
2020	38th TVyNovelas Awards	La usurpadora	Best Co-lead Actor	Won
