= María Magdalena (TV series) =

- Genre: Biographical
- Created by: Lina Uribe; Darío Vanegas; Jaqueline Vargas
- Written by: Lina Uribe; Darío Vanegas; Jaqueline Vargas; Marcela Rodríguez; Jacques Bonnavent
- Directed by: Felipe Cano; Rodrigo Lalinde
- Starring: María Fernanda Yepes
- Theme music composer: Juan Pablo Martínez; Martha Lucía Miranda
- Opening theme: "Instrumental" by Orquesta Sinfónica Javeriana
- Country of origin: Colombia
- Original language: Spanish

Production
- Executive producers: Juan Pablo Posada; Angélica Guerra; Daniel Ucrós
- Production locations: La Guajira; Desierto de la Tatacoa; Villa de Leyva; Mosquera, Cundinamarca; Chia, Cundinamarca; Guatavita; Bogota; Subacoche; Ouarzazat; Merzouga

Original release
- Network: TVN
- Release: 15 October 2018 – 1 February 2019

María Magdalena is a Mexican biographical television series produced by Sony Pictures Television and Dopamine for TV Azteca. It is a biblical drama based on the life of Mary Magdalene, and it stars María Fernanda Yepes as the titular character. The series is written by Lina Uribe, Darío Vanegas, and Jaqueline Vargas, and has the executive production of Daniel Ucros, and Juan Pablo Posada.

The start of production was confirmed on 30 January 2018, and 60 episodes were confirmed for the first season. It premiered first in Panama on TVN on 15 October 2018 and ended on 1 February 2019.

== Cast ==
- María Fernanda Yepes as Mary Magdalene
- Manolo Cardona as Jesus
- Andrés Parra as Pedro
- Luis Roberto Guzmán as Valerio
- Diana Lein as Herodías
- Cesar Mora as Herodes
- Pakey Vásquez as Barrabas
- Alejandro de Marino as Lázaro
- Gustavo Sánchez Parra as Cusas
- Jacqueline Arenal as Mary
- Claudio Cataño as Ur
- Andrés Suárez as Tribuno Emilio
- Danielle Arciniegas as Salome
- Juan Fernando Sánchez as Yair
- Juana Arboleda as Juana
- Juan Manuel Lenis as Andrew the Apostle
- Vicente Peña as Mateo
- Alejandro Buitrago as Santiago
- Maia Landaburu as Rebeca
- Luis Miguel González as John the Evangelist
- María Teresa Barreto as Abigail
- Anderson Balsero as Bartholomew the Apostle
