= Efectos secundarios =

2006 Mexican comedy drama film

Efectos Secundarios
- Directed by: Issa López
- Written by: Issa López
- Produced by: Walter Navas
- Starring: Marina de Tavira; Alejandra Gollás; Arturo Barba; Pedro Izquierdo
- Cinematography: Carlos Aguilera
- Edited by: Jorge García
- Music by: Jermaine Stegall
- Production companies: Warner Bros. Pictures Mexico; Videocine; Traziende Films
- Distributed by: Warner Bros. Pictures (through Videocine)
- Release date: 1 September 2006
- Running time: 111 minutes
- Country: Mexico
- Language: Spanish

Efectos Secundarios ("Side Effects") is a 2006 Mexican satirical comedy-drama film directed by Issa López. The film stars Marina de Tavira, Alejandra Gollás, Arturo Barba and Pedro Izquierdo. It was originally released to theatres in Mexico on September 1, 2006.

== Plot ==
Marina, Adan, Mimí and Ignacio met in high school. Marina fell in love with Ignacio at graduation, after he pulled her out of a pool and gave her mouth-to-mouth resuscitation, which she interpreted as a kiss. During graduation as well, Adan in a prank gone awry broke Mimi's ankle, which resulted on her missing out on her one shot to appear in a famous soap opera. Now twelve years later Marina is a sculptor unable to finish her latest piece. Adan is a recovering alcoholic, junkie and sex addict. Mimi works in a kids show playing the part of a bumblebee and Ignacio is a risk analyst for an insurance company, obsessed with the death of his girlfriend 8 years before. They all attend a high school reunion party for different reasons. Marina wants to find out if Ignacio feels something for her, Adan wants to rekindle his old relationship with his ex "La Chule", Mimi was forced to attend by her overbearing mother once again on the eve of a big audition and Ignacio goes to see Mimi, his cousin. During the course of the reunion Adan during the heat of passion with his ex accidentally pushes Mimi off the roof breaking her ankle once more and losing his cellphone in the process which is subsequently found by Mimi, who swears revenge upon Adan. Ignacio and Marina meet, and Ignacio reveals that he never liked her, at this point Marina is struck by a car in the same spot Ignacio's girlfriend was. Later at the hospital Marina agrees to help Ignacio find the driver if he agrees to date her, he reluctantly agrees. Mimi having once more lost an important audition has given up and accepted her life, but her mother forces the producer give her an audition during which she is interrupted by Adan and his girlfriend's niece, who immediately catches the producers eye and is cast instead of Mimi. Mimi proceeds to wreak vengeance upon Adan taking to point of consuming heroin and alcohol again. Meanwhile, Ignacio finds the truck driver and proceeds to talk to him, he feels hatred towards the trucker at first but soon his feeling turn to pity when he listens to his story, now finally having obtained closure over the death of his wife he realizes he loves Marina and goes to see her. While kissing she notices burns on his hands and asks him about them, he responds that during graduation he and his friends were making a bonfire near the pool and his arm caught on fire when he went through his arm in the water to put out the flames. Marina gets upset about this, she thought Ignacio had saved her because he loved her. Marina storms off looking for Adan only to find him drunk at the school trying to stop Mimi from killing herself; after Ignacio appears, Adan and Ignacio fight which leaves Ignacio unconscious and in the pool. Marina not wanting to lose Ignacio jumps in the pool and rescues him.
