= List of La Piloto episodes =

La Piloto is an American crime drama television series created by W Studios and produced by Lemon Films Studios for Univision and Televisa. It is an original story based on real-life events, and began airing on American broadcast channel Univision on 7 March 2017. The series tells the departures of Yolanda Cadena (Livia Brito) and all her efforts to become an airplane pilot.

On June 29, 2017, producer Billy Rovzar confirmed that the series would be renewed for a second season to be released in 2018.

== Series overview ==
Series	Episodes	Originally released		
Series	Episodes	First released	Last released	Network
1	80	7 March 2017	26 June 2017	Univision
2	82	18 June 2018	7 October 2018	Las Estrellas

== Episodes ==
=== Season 1 (2017) ===
No. overall	No. in season	Title	Original release date	US viewers (millions)
1	1	"Chapter 1"	7 March 2017	1.92
2	2	"Chapter 2"	8 March 2017	1.79
3	3	"Chapter 3"	9 March 2017	1.94
4	4	"Chapter 4"	10 March 2017	1.70
5	5	"Chapter 5"	13 March 2017	1.85
6	6	"Chapter 6"	14 March 2017	1.76
7	7	"Chapter 7"	15 March 2017	1.87
8	8	"Chapter 8"	16 March 2017	1.93
9	9	"Chapter 9"	17 March 2017	1.86
10	10	"Chapter 10"	20 March 2017	1.77
11	11	"Chapter 11"	21 March 2017	1.80
12	12	"Chapter 12"	22 March 2017	1.92
13	13	"Chapter 13"	23 March 2017	1.57
14	14	"Chapter 14"	24 March 2017	1.35
15	15	"Chapter 15"	27 March 2017	1.54
16	16	"Chapter 16"	28 March 2017	1.72
17	17	"Chapter 17"	29 March 2017	1.72
18	18	"Chapter 18"	30 March 2017	1.60
19	19	"Chapter 19"	31 March 2017	1.65
20	20	"Chapter 20"	3 April 2017	1.60
21	21	"Chapter 21"	4 April 2017	1.74
22	22	"Chapter 22"	5 April 2017	1.56
23	23	"Chapter 23"	6 April 2017	1.69
24	24	"Chapter 24"	7 April 2017	1.37
25	25	"Chapter 25"	10 April 2017	1.65
26	26	"Chapter 26"	11 April 2017	1.53
27	27	"Chapter 27"	12 April 2017	1.64
28	28	"Chapter 28"	13 April 2017	1.62
29	29	"Chapter 29"	14 April 2017	1.50
30	30	"Chapter 30"	17 April 2017	1.82
31	31	"Chapter 31"	18 April 2017	1.68
32	32	"Chapter 32"	19 April 2017	1.82
33	33	"Chapter 33"	20 April 2017	1.82
34	34	"Chapter 34"	21 April 2017	1.70
35	35	"Chapter 35"	24 April 2017	1.73
36	36	"Chapter 36"	25 April 2017	1.78
37	37	"Chapter 37"	26 April 2017	1.80
38	38	"Chapter 38"	27 April 2017	1.70
39	39	"Chapter 39"	28 April 2017	1.84
40	40	"Chapter 40"	1 May 2017	1.90
41	41	"Chapter 41"	2 May 2017	1.81
42	42	"Chapter 42"	3 May 2017	1.80
43	43	"Chapter 43"	4 May 2017	1.89
44	44	"Chapter 44"	5 May 2017	1.92
45	45	"Chapter 45"	8 May 2017	1.82
46	46	"Chapter 46"	9 May 2017	1.68
47	47	"Chapter 47"	10 May 2017	1.57
48	48	"Chapter 48"	11 May 2017	1.73
49	49	"Chapter 49"	12 May 2017	1.55
50	50	"Chapter 50"	15 May 2017	1.57
51	51	"Chapter 51"	16 May 2017	1.80
52	52	"Chapter 52"	17 May 2017	1.79
53	53	"Chapter 53"	18 May 2017	1.69
54	54	"Chapter 54"	19 May 2017	1.55
55	55	"Chapter 55"	22 May 2017	1.56
56	56	"Chapter 56"	23 May 2017	1.59
57	57	"Chapter 57"	24 May 2017	1.65
58	58	"Chapter 58"	25 May 2017	1.36
59	59	"Chapter 59"	26 May 2017	1.36
60	60	"Chapter 60"	29 May 2017	1.57
61	61	"Chapter 61"	30 May 2017	1.52
62	62	"Chapter 62"	31 May 2017	1.62
63	63	"Chapter 63"	1 June 2017	1.67
64	64	"Chapter 64"	2 June 2017	1.52
65	65	"Chapter 65"	5 June 2017	1.60
66	66	"Chapter 66"	6 June 2017	1.57
67	67	"Chapter 67"	7 June 2017	1.62
68	68	"Chapter 68"	8 June 2017	1.42
69	69	"Chapter 69"	9 June 2017	1.47
70	70	"Chapter 70"	12 June 2017	1.50
71	71	"Chapter 71"	13 June 2017	1.62
72	72	"Chapter 72"	14 June 2017	1.48
73	73	"Chapter 73"	15 June 2017	1.43
74	74	"Chapter 74"	16 June 2017	1.36
75	75	"Chapter 75"	19 June 2017	1.46
76	76	"Chapter 76"	20 June 2017	1.59
77	77	"Chapter 77"	21 June 2017	1.56
78	78	"Chapter 78"	22 June 2017	1.51
79	79	"Chapter 79"	23 June 2017	1.45
80	80	"Chapter 80"	26 June 2017	1.83

=== Season 2 (2018) ===
No. overall	No. in season	Title	Original air date	Mexico viewers (millions)
81	1	"Santamaría secuestra a Arley"	18 June 2018	5.5
82	2	"Los Kilichenko contratan a Santamaría"	19 June 2018	2.6
83	3	"John mata a un hombre en la cárcel"	20 June 2018	2.7
84	4	"Yolanda piensa en John para atrapar a la mafia rusa"	21 June 2018	2.7
85	5	"Andrea recibe una advertencia de Los Kilichenko"	22 June 2018	2.6
86	6	"Dave libera a John Lucio"	25 June 2018	2.3
87	7	"Santamaría al borde de la muerte"	26 June 2018	2.5
88	8	"Waters impide que Dave haga su trabajo"	27 June 2018	2.6
89	9	"El Muñeco abusa de Mónica"	28 June 2018	2.3
90	10	"Dave y John se enfrentan a golpes"	29 June 2018	2.0
91	11	"John y Yolanda desconfían de Mónica"	2 July 2018	2.4
92	12	"Irina secuestra a John Lucio"	3 July 2018	2.7
93	13	"Andrea encuentra a Irina y Santamaría"	4 July 2018	2.6
94	14	"El plan de Mónica falla y escapa con Santamaría"	5 July 2018	2.6
95	15	"Wilmer es enviado al club de los Kilichenko"	6 July 2018	2.9
96	16	"Morrison es despedido de US FLY y se venga de Yolanda"	9 July 2018	2.5
97	17	"Santamaría condiciona a Vasily Kilichenko"	10 July 2018	2.7
98	18	"Olivia consigue interrogar a Morrison"	11 July 2018	2.7
99	19	"Santamaría y Waters atentan contra la vida de Dave"	12 July 2018	2.5
100	20	"Rosalba mata a Garza y salva la vida de John"	13 July 2018	2.4
101	21	"Regueros le da una segunda oportunidad a Yolanda"	16 July 2018	2.3
102	22	"Morrison intenta entrar a la organización de los Kilichenko"	17 July 2018	2.8
103	23	"Andrea le confiesa su amor a Wilmer"	18 July 2018	2.8
104	24	"John es el nuevo piloto de los Kilichenko"	19 July 2018	2.5
105	25	"Morrison acepta trabajar para Santamaría"	20 July 2018	2.9
106	26	"Irina desea a John y engaña a Santamaría"	23 July 2018	2.5
107	27	"Mónica y Muñeco secuestran un avión"	24 July 2018	2.5
108	28	"Santamaría va al rescate de Muñeco y Mónica"	25 July 2018	2.6
109	29	"Santamaría planea eliminar a Vasily Kilichenko"	26 July 2018	2.8
110	30	"Arley logra escapar"	27 July 2018	2.6
111	31	"Yolanda y Arley se reencuentran"	30 July 2018	2.8
112	32	"Irina quiere vengar la muerte de su padre"	31 July 2018	2.8
113	33	"Yolanda es despedida de USFLY"	1 August 2018	2.7
114	34	"Dave es arrestado"	2 August 2018	2.6
115	35	"John cumplirá su condena en México"	3 August 2018	2.8
116	36	"Yolanda intenta cruzar la frontera"	6 August 2018	2.8
117	37	"Irina hace una ceremonia para despedir a Vasily"	7 August 2018	2.4
118	38	"Mena reaparece para ayudar a Yolanda"	8 August 2018	2.6
119	39	"Dave termina con Yolanda"	9 August 2018	2.6
120	40	"John hace un trato para obtener su libertad"	10 August 2018	2.7
121	41	"Irina y Santamaría compran USFLY"	13 August 2018	2.7
122	42	"John sale de la cárcel y busca a Wilmer"	14 August 2018	2.6
123	43	"Santamaría le pone un alto a Regueros"	15 August 2018	2.5
124	44	"Mónica se hace cargo de Dave"	16 August 2018	2.8
125	45	"John quiere recuperar su dinero"	17 August 2018	2.3
126	46	"Olivia denuncia a John con la policía"	20 August 2018	2.5
127	47	"Yolanda se entera que Mónica secuestró a Dave"	21 August 2018	2.5
128	48	"John sigue amando a Yolanda y le pide una oportunidad"	22 August 2018	2.4
129	49	"Mónica recibe la orden de capturar a Buitre"	23 August 2018	2.5
130	50	"Waters intenta acabar con Matallana"	24 August 2018	2.3
131	51	"Yolanda y John compran una avioneta para rescatar a Dave"	27 August 2018	2.3
132	52	"Mena le confiesa a Arley que es su padre"	28 August 2018	2.4
133	53	"Irina se entera que Santamaría dio la orden para matar a Vasily"	29 August 2018	2.6
134	54	"Yolanda y John retoman su amor"	30 August 2018	2.4
135	55	"Santamaría y los rusos planean un ataque terrorista"	31 August 2018	2.4
136	56	"Morrison y Waters le juran lealtad a Santamaría"	3 September 2018	2.5
137	57	"Felicidad finge su muerte y escapa del Club Diablo"	4 September 2018	2.5
138	58	"Irina y Santamaría se enfrentan"	5 September 2018	2.9
139	59	"Santamaría tiene un nuevo enemigo"	6 September 2018	2.2
140	60	"Irina se convierte en una esclava del Club Diablo"	7 September 2018	2.4
141	61	"Felicidad acepta ser novia de Santamaría"	10 September 2018	2.7
142	62	"Mena es detenido por la policía"	11 September 2018	2.7
143	63	"Vasily está vivo y busca venganza"	12 September 2018	2.7
144	64	"Dave le pide una oportunidad a Santamaría"	13 September 2018	2.7
145	65	"Rosalba y Arley son detenidos por la policía"	14 September 2018	2.7
146	66	"Yolanda le pide ayuda al Lic. Flores para rescatar a Arley"	17 September 2018	2.5
147	67	"Yoladna evita que Santamaría se lleve de nuevo a Arley"	18 September 2018	2.6
148	68	"Wilmer es secuestrado por Waters"	19 September 2018	2.5
149	69	"Rosalba es brutalmente golpeada en la cárcel"	20 September 2018	2.9
150	70	"Vasily se enfrenta a Mónica y Dave"	21 September 2018	2.6
151	71	"Yolanda pisa la cárcel"	24 September 2018	2.5
152	72	"Felicidad mata a Venancio"	25 September 2018	2.9
153	73	"John se convierte en prisionero de Santamaría"	26 September 2018	2.9
154	74	"Santamaría descubre que Olivia y Morrison son pareja"	27 September 2018	2.8
155	75	"John y Mena toman de rehén a Mónica"	28 September 2018	2.8
156	76	"Vasily rescata a Irina del Club Diablo"	1 October 2018	2.7
157	77	"Dave llega a la hacienda para ayudar a John y Mena"	2 October 2018	2.6
158	78	"Los Kilichenco y Dave se preparan para atacar a Santamaría"	3 October 2018	2.6
159	79	"Yolanda y Mónica se ven cara a cara en la cárcel"	4 October 2018	2.6
160	80	"John rescata a Yolanda"	5 October 2018	2.7
161	81	"Yolanda se reencuentra con Dave y se preparan para la batalla"	7 October 2018	2.9
162	82	"John y Dave matan a Santamaría"	7 October 2018	2.9

== Webisodes ==
=== El celular de La Piloto (2017) ===
No.	Title	Original release date	Length (minutes)
1	"Episode 1"	30 March 2017	4:26
Discover all the secrets that Yolanda and the characters of 'La Piloto' keep on their phones.
2	"Episode 2"	6 April 2017	3:01
Yolanda, John, Zulima and the stewardesses of 'La Piloto' made a WhatsApp group chat but someone did not really like the idea.
3	"Episode 3"	13 April 2017	2:45
John, Zulima and the stewardesses of 'La Piloto' began to talk in their WhatsApp group, but Yolanda did not write anything.
4	"Episode 4"	19 April 2017	2:05
Yolanda surprised John with one of her photographs in the WhatsApp group.
5	"Episode 5"	26 April 2017	2:47
Yolanda unleashed the gossip among her friends by accepting a date with John.
6	"Episode 6"	3 May 2017	3:15
Yolanda and John set fire to the WhatsApp group by revealing their relationship.
7	"Episode 7"	10 May 2017	2:16
Yolanda was furious with someone and even blocked it in her WhatsApp.
8	"Episode 8"	17 May 2017	2:47
Yolanda was the victim of a betrayal by one of her friends.
75	"Episode 75"	24 May 2017	2:32
Zulima unleashed John's jealousy by telling him a Yolanda gossip.
10	"Episode 10"	31 May 2017	2:33
John finally took revenge on Yolanda believing that he betrayed him to Dave.
