= Reinado Internacional del Café 2009 =

Reinado Internacional del Café 2009, was held in Manizales, Colombia, on January 10, 2009. 21 contestants attended the event. The winner was Alejandra Mesa Estrada, from Colombia.

== Results ==
=== Placements ===
| Final results | Contestant |
|---|---|
| international coffee queen 2009 | Colombia - Alejandra Mesa |
| 1st runner-up | Spain - Ana Montabés |
| 2nd runner-up | Venezuela - Natasha Domínguez |
| 3rd runner-up | Dominican Republic - Victoria Fernández |
| 4th runner-up | Brazil - Anelize Garcia |
| Top 10 | Argentina - Alejandra Bernal; Canada - Chanel Beckenlehner; Panama - Alejandra Arias; Poland - Patrycja Jactzad; United States - Michelle Fleming |

=== Special awards ===
- Queen of Water: Venezuela
- Queen of Police: Venezuela
- Best Face: Spain
- Best Body: Colombia

== Official delegates ==
| Country | Contestant | Age | Height (cm) | Height (ft) | Hometown |
|---|---|---|---|---|---|
| Argentina | Alejandra Bernal | 20 | 178 | 5'10" | San Salvador de Jujuy |
| Aruba | Nuraysa Lispier | 23 | 176 | 5'9" | Sint Nicolaas |
| Bahamas | Kerel Pinder | 23 | 170 | 5'7" | Freeport |
| Bolivia | Laura Olivera | 18 | 173 | 5'8" | Yacuiba |
| Brazil | Anelize Garcia | 25 | 177 | 5'10" | Maringá |
| Canada | Chanel Beckenlehner | 20 | 175 | 5'9" | Toronto |
| Colombia | Alejandra Mesa | 22 | 175 | 5'9" | Medellín |
| Costa Rica | Johanna Solano | 18 | 175 | 5'9" | Heredia |
| Dominican Republic | Victoria Fernández | 21 | 178 | 5'10" | Santiago |
| Ecuador | Tatiana Chele | 17 | 162 | 5'2" | Manta |
| El Salvador | Laura Jiménez | 22 | 173 | 5'8" | Poleros |
| Guatemala | Maribel Arana | 23 | 173 | 5'8" | Guatemala City |
| Honduras | Paola Sabillón | 18 | 179 | 5'11" | San Francisco de Yojoa |
| Panama | Alejandra Arias | 20 | 176 | 5'9" | Panama City |
| Paraguay | Fiorella Forestieri | 27 | 170 | 5'7" | Asunción |
| Peru | María Jesús Salas | 19 | 180 | 5'11" | Lima |
| Poland | Patrycja Jactzac | 20 | 175 | 5'9" | Warsaw |
| Puerto Rico | Jenniffer Morales | 18 | 172 | 5'8" | Mayagüez |
| Spain | Ana Montabés | 21 | 177 | 5'10" | Jaén |
| United States | Michelle Fleming | 19 | 173 | 5'8" | Hesperia |
| Venezuela | Natasha Domínguez | 18 | 173 | 5'8" | Caracas |
