= Adriana Nieto =

Mexican actress (born 1978)

- Born: Adriana Nieto Villanueva; March 13, 1978 (age 47); Mexico City, D.F., Mexico
- Occupation: Actress
- Years active: 1998-present
- Spouse: Francisco Alanis (2003-present)
- Children: Maria José (b. 2007); Camila & Juan Pablo (b. 2009)
- Parent(s): Miguel Ángel Nieto; Marcela Villanueva
- Relatives: Claudia Nieto Villanueva

Adriana Nieto (born Adriana Nieto Villanueva on March 13, 1978) is a Mexican actress.

== Filmography ==
Telenovelas, Theater
Year	Title	Role	Notes
1998	La usurpadora	Beatrice	Special Appearance
1998	Lucas		Theatrical Performance
1998-99	El Privilegio de Amar	Lizbeth Duval Hernández de Salazar	Supporting Role
1999	Por tu amor	Abigail Parra	Supporting Role
1999-00	Cuento de Navidad		TV Mini-series
2000	Locura de amor	Natalia Sandoval #1	Protagonist
2015-17	Como dice el dicho	Various roles	8 episodes
2017	La Piloto	Engracia de Sinisterra	Supporting Role
2018	Like	Martha Reyes	Supporting Role
2019	Silvia Pinal, frente a ti	Livia	Supporting Role
