= María Fernanda Yepes =

Colombian actress and model (born 1980)

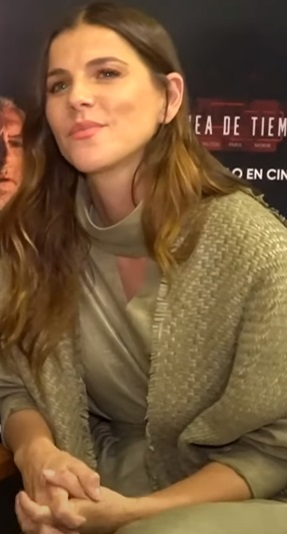
- Yepes in 2023
- Born: María Fernanda Yepes Alzate; 23 December 1980 (age 45); Medellín, Antioquia, Colombia
- Occupations: Actress and model
- Years active: 2004–present

María Fernanda Yepes Alzate (born 23 December 1980) is a Colombian actress and model. She is mostly known for playing Yésica Franco "La Diabla", in the hit Telemundo telenovela Sin Senos no hay Paraíso. She also played the title role in the Colombian telenovela Rosario Tijeras.

== Personal life ==
María Fernanda Yepés started modeling in her home country of Colombia at the age of 14. As a model, she has been part of important national and international campaigns including one of Colombia's top female intimate apparel labels. Most recently she was seen as a print model for the swimwear line Agua Bendita, which was featured in the "Hottest Swimsuit Issue" of Sports Illustrated in 2007, 2008 and 2009. In order to pursue a career in the media, she moved to Bogotá. Yepés has also studied psychology, social communication, and journalism; she also took photography and cooking classes, and spent three years in Spain studying theater art.

== Filmography ==
=== Film ===
Year	Title	Role	Notes
2013	Frío, silencio, aire	Ana	Short film
2014	Out of the Dark	Doctor	
2014	Amateur	No Name	Short film
2023	Línea de tiempo	Nina Nadal	

=== Television ===
Year	Title	Role	Notes
2006	La Diva	Kathy	
2006	En los tacones de Eva	Valentina	
2007	Pura sangre	Natalia / Venus	
2008–2009	Sin senos no hay paraíso	Yésica Franco "La Diabla"	Main role
2010	Rosario Tijeras	María del Rosario	Main role
2011	Mentes en shock	Renata Solá	Episode: "Pilot"
2012	Lynch	Florencia Villalonga	Episode: "Llorando sobre la leche derramada"
2012	La Teniente	Teniente Roberta Ballesteros	Main role; 24 episodes
2015	Demente criminal	Detective Gabriela Fons	Recurring role; 50 episodes
2016	Azúcar	Caridad Solaz Vallecilla	Recurring role
2016	Blanca	Alexandra	TV Mini-Series
2017	La Piloto	Zulima Montes "La Bruja"	Main role (season 1); 80 episodes
2018	José José, el príncipe de la canción	Anel	Main role; 52 episodes
2018–2019	María Magdalena	María Magdalena	Main role
2020	Dark Desire	Brenda	Main role
