= La Piloto =

- Genre: Crime thriller; Drama
- Created by: Jörg Hiller
- Written by: Jörg Hiller; Maria Cecilia Boenheim; Jorge Cervantes; Jairo Estrada; Carolina Barrera Meléndez; Carlos Bardasano
- Directed by: Álvaro Curiel; Rolando Ocampo; Fernando Rovzar; David Ruiz; Alejandro Lozano
- Starring: Livia Brito; Arap Bethke; María Fernanda Yepes; Alejandro Nones; María de la Fuente; Verónica Montes; Natasha Domínguez; María Fernanda García; Mauricio Aspe; Stephanie Salas; Arturo Barba; Tommy Vásquez; Macarena Achaga; Juan Colucho; Margarita Muñoz; Oka Giner; Ilza Ponko; Lisardo; Paulo Quevedo; Juan Vidal; Julia Urbini; Mauricio Pimentel; Nico Galán; Julio Echeverry
- Music by: Carlos Mármo
- Opening theme: "Buena vida" (Note: Performed by Manuel Ramos in the first season, and Daddy Yankee & Natti Natasha in the second season.)
- Ending theme: "La Piloto" by Liza Quin
- Country of origin: United States
- Original language: Spanish
- No. of seasons: 2
- No. of episodes: 162 (list of episodes)

Production
- Executive producer: Patricio Wills
- Production location: Durango, Mexico
- Cinematography: Mario Gallegos; Khristian Olivares; Marcia Valverde
- Editor: Alba Merchan Hamann

Original release
- Network: Univision; Las Estrellas
- Release: 7 March 2017 – 7 October 2018

La Piloto is a Spanish-language crime drama television series created by W Studios and produced by Lemon Films Studios for Univision and Televisa. It's an original story based on real-life events and it started airing on American broadcast channel Univision on 7 March 2017, and concluded on Mexican broadcast channel Las Estrellas on 7 October 2018. The series tells the departures of Yolanda Cadena (Livia Brito) and all her efforts to become an airplane pilot.

== Synopsis ==
The series tells the story of Yolanda (Livia Brito), a young Mexican flight attendant who is discovering how far she is able to reach in order to achieve her great dream: to be an airline pilot. The murder of her father gives her the impetus necessary to fulfill her goal. Her first contact with the world of aviation is to be stewardess, fighting against the multiple obstacles imposed by competing in a totally male environment. John Lucio, a drug lord, is held captive and is in direct need of a ransom, however Zulima, the head of the stewardesses, is unable to make the delivery, and asks Yolanda to do so. Yolanda is thrust into the drug business and John Lucio teaches her how to fly but Dave Mejia is a DEA Agent, whom she initially had feelings for, and puts her in the center of a burning love triangle.

== Cast and characters ==
- Livia Brito as Yolanda Cadena
- Arap Bethke as John Lucio
- María Fernanda Yepes as Zulima Montes (season 1)
- Alejandro Nones as Óscar Lucio (season 1)
- María de la Fuente as Mónica Ortega
- Verónica Montes as Lizbeth Álvarez (seasons 1–2)
- Natasha Domínguez as Amanda Cuadrado (season 1)
- María Fernanda García as Estela Lesmes (season 1)
- Mauricio Aspe as Arley Mena
- Stephanie Salas as Rosalba Cadena
- Arturo Barba as Zeky Gilmas (season 1)
- Tommy Vásquez as Arnoldo Santamaría
- Macarena Achaga as Olivia Nieves (season 1)
- Juan Colucho as Dave Mejía
- Margarita Muñoz as Andrea Pulido (season 2)
- Oka Giner as Olivia Nieves (season 2)
- Ilza Ponko as Irina Kilichenko (season 2)
- Lisardo as Vasily Kilichenko (season 2)
- Paulo Quevedo as Bill Morrison (season 2)
- Juan Vidal as Bastián Regueros (season 2)
- Julia Urbini as Felicidad (season 2)
- Mauricio Pimentel as Muñeco (season 2)
- Nico Galán as Wilmer Aguilar
- Julio Echeverry as Gilberto Pulido (season 2)

== Episodes ==
La Piloto premiered on 7 March 2017. On June 29, 2017, producer Billy Rovzar confirmed that the series would be renewed for a second season to be released on 18 June 2018 on Las Estrellas.

Series	Episodes	Originally released		
Series	Episodes	First released	Last released	Network
1	80	7 March 2017	26 June 2017	Univision
2	82	18 June 2018	7 October 2018	Las Estrellas

== Production ==
The series is created by W Studios of the producer Patricio Wills and produced by Lemon Films Studios for Univision and Televisa. It is written by Jorg Hiller who previously wrote Tiro de gracias and Porque el amor manda and is inspired by real-life events. Filming of the series began on September 5, 2016. For the filming of the series Livia Brito took aviation classes.

On October 18, 2017, Patricio Wills of W Studios confirmed that the production of the second season of the series would begin in January 2018. On January 26, 2018, the start of production of the second season was confirmed. On February 1, 2018, Ilza Ponko was confirmed as the main villain of the second season. A preview of the second season was released on 8 May 2018.

== Ratings ==
=== U.S. rating ===
Viewership and ratings per season of La Piloto
Season	Episodes	First aired		Last aired		Avg. viewers (millions)
Season	Episodes	Date	Viewers (millions)	Date	Viewers (millions)	Avg. viewers (millions)
1	80	7 March 2017	1.92	26 June 2017	1.83	1.66
2	56	29 July 2018	1.14	18 October 2018	1.09	1.03

=== Mexico rating ===
Viewership and ratings per season of La Piloto
Season	Episodes	First aired		Last aired		Avg. viewers (millions)
Season	Episodes	Date	Viewers (millions)	Date	Viewers (millions)	Avg. viewers (millions)
1	67	21 May 2017	14.7	20 August 2017	26.4	TBD
2	82	18 June 2018	5.5	7 October 2018	2.9	2.64

== Awards and nominations ==
Year	Award	Category	Nominated	Result
2019	TVyNovelas Awards	Best Telenovela of the Year	Carlos Bardasano	Nominated
2019	TVyNovelas Awards	Best Actress	Livia Brito	Nominated
2019	TVyNovelas Awards	Best Antagonist Actress	Ilza Ponko	Nominated
2019	TVyNovelas Awards	Best Direction	Rolando Ocampo	Nominated
2019	TVyNovelas Awards	Best Musical Theme	"Buena vida" (Daddy Yankee and Natti Natasha)	Nominated
2019	TVyNovelas Awards	Best Cast	La Piloto	Nominated
