= Natasha Domínguez =

Venezuelan actress

- Born: Natasha Alexandra Domínguez Boscán; March 26, 1990 (age 35); Caracas, Venezuela
- Height: 1.73 m (5 ft 8 in)
- Beauty pageant titleholder
- Title: Elite Model Look Venezuela 2006 (finalist); Miss Venezuela 2008 (1st runner up); Reinado Internacional del Café 2009 (2nd runner up)
- Hair color: dark blonde
- Eye color: green

Natasha Alexandra Domínguez Boscán, is a Venezuelan actress. She was one of the finalists in the Elite Model Look Venezuela 2006 pageant, held in Caracas, Venezuela, on October 10, 2006. Domínguez was represented the Sucre state in the Miss Venezuela 2008 pageant, on September 10, 2008, and won the title of 1st runner up.

She represented Venezuela in the Reinado Internacional del Café 2009, in Manizales, Colombia, on January 10, 2009, and won the title of 2nd runner up.

She started her acting career with Telemundo in 2012, representing "Anita" in "El Rostro de la Venganza". She also participated in Grachi the third season as Maggie. Her most recent acting job was with Univision as “Amanda Cuadrado” in “La Piloto” and on Telemundo in 2018 as “Ashley Johnson” in “Mi Familia Perfecta”

== Filmography ==
=== Film roles ===
Year	Title	Role	Notes
2016	Love Kills	Lucrecía	
2018	Down's Revenge	Kaite	

=== Television roles ===
Year	Title	Role	Notes
2012	El Talismán	Muñeca	
2012	El rostro de la venganza	Anita	
2013	Grachi	María Graciela "Maggie" de la Isla	5 episodes
2013	Marido en alquiler	Diosa	56 episodes
2014	Voltea pa' que te enamores	Felicia Amezcua	123 episodes
2015	Demente criminal	Marcela Celaya	50 episodes
2017	La Piloto	Amanda Cuadrado	55 episodes, 7 as archive footage
2017	La doble vida de Estela Carrillo	Amanda Cuadrado	Episode: "Final: Part 2"
2017	Milagros de Navidad	Elisa Romero	Episode: "Una sorpresa para Elisa"
2018	Mi familia perfecta	Ashley Johnson	
2019	El Dragón: Return of a Warrior	Claudia	
