= Lisardo =

Mexican actor

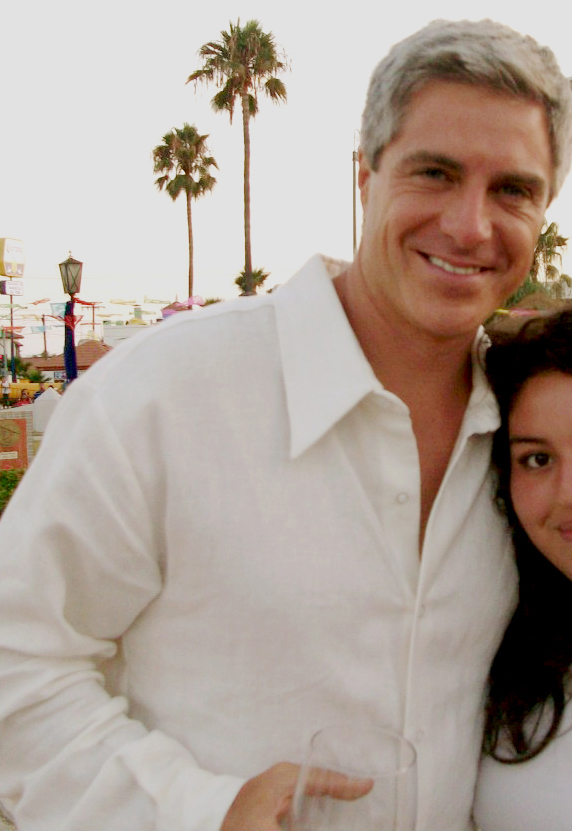
- Born: Lisardo Emilio Guarinos Riera; October 7, 1970 (age 55); Valencia, Spain
- Occupations: Actor, singer
- Years active: 2000–present
- Spouse: Lisset (m. 2008–2014)

Lisardo (born Lisardo Emilio Guarinos Riera in Valencia, Spain, on October 7, 1970) is an actor and singer. From December 2008 to 2014, he was married to Mexican singer and actress Lisset.

== Filmography ==
=== Films ===
Year	Title	Role	Notes
2008	Casi divas	Miguel Almarena	
2010	Héroes verdaderos	Virrey Venegas / Fernando VII / Peninsular 1	Voice
2012	Between Us	Marcos Acosta	

=== Television ===
Year	Title	Role	Notes
2000	Policías, en el corazón de la calle		Episode: "Algo fieramente puro"
2001	Anti-vicio		Episode: "Hijos de la luz"
2004	Mujer de Madera	Emilio Arroyo	
2006	Rebelde	Martín Reverte / Octavio Reverte	Supporting Role
2006	Amar sin límites	Piero Escobar	
2007	Yo amo a Juan Querendón	Gustavo	
2007	Lola, érase una vez	Franz Wolfgang	
2007	La familia P. Luche	Papá de Diego	Episode: "Carrera de perros"
2007–2008	Palabra de mujer	Hernán Gil	
2008	Mujeres asesinas	Fermín Castaño	Episode: "Sandra, trepadora"
2008–2009	Alma de hierro	Diego	Supporting role
2009–2010	Corazón salvaje	Féderico Martín Del Campo	Supporting role
2010–2011	Cuando me enamoro	Agustín Dunant	Main cast
2011	El encanto del águila	Bernardo Cologan	Episode: "La traición de los Herejes"
2011–2012	Esperanza del corazón	Aldo Cabral	Main cast
2013	Amores verdaderos	Carlos González / Joan Constantín	Recurring role
2013	De que te quiero, te quiero	Carlos	Guest star
2014–2015	Mi corazón es tuyo	Enrique	Supporting role
2015	Yo no creo en los hombres, el origen	José Luis	Television film
2015	Amor de barrio	Adalberto Cruz	Main cast
2017	En tierras salvajes	Carlos Molina	Main cast
2018	La Piloto	Vasily Kilichenko	Main cast
2020	Rubi	Arturo de la fuente	Supporting role
2020–2021	La mexicana y el güero	Mr. Monti	Guest star
2021–2022	Contigo sí	Anibal Treviño	Main cast
2022	Amor dividido	Lorenzo Iñiguez	Supporting role
2022	Mujeres asesinas	Francisco del Río	Episode: "Bodas de plata"
2024	Tu vida es mi vida	Rolando	
2025–present	Muero por Marilú	Matías	Main role
