= Arturo Barba =

Mexican actor

- Barba in 2019
- Born: 21 May 1973 (age 53); Mexico City, Distrito Federal, Mexico
- Education: Centro de Educación Artística
- Occupation: Actor
- Years active: 1992–present

Arturo Barba (born 21 May 1973) is a Mexican actor and producer known for appearing in telenovelas and movies. He was born in Mexico City, Distrito Federal, Mexico.

== Biography ==
In 2019, he won a Best Supporting Actor at the Premios TVyNovelas for Amar a Muerte.

== Filmography ==
=== Film roles ===
| Year | Title | Roles | Notes |
|---|---|---|---|
| 1992 | Anoche soñé contigo | Blind hairdresser client | |
| 1995 | La revancha | Pancho | |
| 2002 | Magnicidio: Complot en Lomas Taurinas | El Licenciado | |
| 2003 | Zurdo | Tartamudo | |
| 2006 | Efectos secundarios | Adán | |
| 2008 | Casi divas | Stage Director | |
| 2010 | Desafío | Jack | |
| 2011 | Nos vemos, papá | José | |
| 2013 | El Palacio de las Flores | Luis | Short film |
| 2014 | Fachon Models | Marín | |
| 2014 | Asteroide | Mauricio Valverde | |
| 2015 | Plato para dos | Ernesto | Short film |
| 2015 | Sabrás qué hacer conmigo | Arturo | |
| 2016 | Rumbos paralelos | Franccesco | |
| 2016 | Qué pena tu vida | Lorena's ex | |
| 2016 | Un padre no tan padre | Bill | |
| 2018 | Sacúdete las penas | García | |
| 2018 | Más sabe el Diablo por viejo | Hugo Bellamy | |
| 2018 | Ya veremos | Anesthesiologist | |
| 2020 | El mesero | Saviñón | |

=== Television ===
| Year | Title | Role | Notes |
|---|---|---|---|
| 1998 | Una luz en el camino | Enrique | |
| 1999 | El niño que vino del mar | | |
| 2000 | Primer amor, a mil por hora | Beto | |
| 2001 | María Belén | Polo | |
| 2002 | Las vías del amor | | |
| 2004 | Amar otra vez | Santiago | |
| 2005 | Mujer, casos de la vida real | | "Héroes anónimos" (Season 22, Episode 48) |
| 2007 | Yo amo a Juan Querendón | Fernando Lara Lora | |
| 2008 | Vecinos | Salvador | "Superación personal" (Season 3, Episode 11) |
| 2008 | Terminales | Enrique | 7 episodes |
| 2009 | Hasta que el dinero nos separe | | "Accidente del destino" (Season 1, Episode 1) |
| 2009 | Mujeres asesinas | Sergio | "Tita Garza, estafadora" (Season 2, Episode 6) |
| 2010 | Capadocia | Antonio Garcés | "TY resucitó al tercer día" (Season 2, Episode 11) |
| 2010–2011 | Para volver a amar | Román Pérez | |
| 2011 | Ni contigo ni sin ti | | "De la misma mujer" (Season 1, Episode 107); "Descubre a Ornelas" (Season 1, Episode 113) |
| 2011 | Como dice el dicho | Rodolfo | "No todo lo que brilla es oro" (Season 1, Episode 56) |
| 2011 | El encanto del águila | Pascual Orozco | "El adiós del dictador" (Season 1, Episode 3) |
| 2013–2015 | El Señor de los Cielos | Alí Benjumea "El Turco" | Season 1–2 (86 episodes); Season 3 (2 episode; archive footage) |
| 2014 | Señora Acero | Junio Acero | 18 episodes |
| 2015 | Lo imperdonable | Clemente | 17 episodes |
| 2017 | La Piloto | Zeky Gilmas | 18 episodes |
| 2018 | La bella y las bestias | Emanuel Espitia | |
| 2018–2019 | Amar a muerte | Beltrán | |
| 2020–2022 | Control Z | Rogelio Herrera/Fernando | Main role |
| 2022 | Dark Desire | Íñigo Lazcano | Main role (season 2); 14 episodes |

== Awards and nominations ==
| Year | Award | Category | Nominated works | Result |
|---|---|---|---|---|
| 2007 | Mexican Cinema Journalists | Best Supporting Actor | Efectos secundarios | Nominated |
| 2015 | Premios Tu Mundo | Best Supporting Actor: Series | Señora Acero | Nominated |
