= Juan Colucho =

Argentine actor

- Born: Juan Eduardo Colucho; July 30, 1988 (age 37); Chivilcoy, Buenos Aires, Argentina
- Occupation(s): Actor, model
- Years active: 2013–present

Juan Eduardo Colucho (born July 30, 1988), better known by his stage name Juan Colucho, is an Argentine actor, born in Chivilcoy. He is most recognised for his portrayal of Dave Mejía, the lead character on the W Studios and Lemon Films Studios crime drama series La Piloto. His first major role was in the Televisa drama A que no me dejas.

== Television roles ==
| Year | Title | Role | Notes |
|---|---|---|---|
| 2025 | Yiya | Fernández | |
| 2025 | Bon vivant | Ramón Gueler | |
| 2023–2024 | Buenos chicos | Joaquín Esmeralda | |
| 2022–2023 | Cabo | | |
| 2022 | Corazón guerrero | Patricio Salgado | Recurring role |
| 2022 | Lo que la gente cuenta | Óscar | |
| 2018 | Descontrol | Alberto | |
| 2017–2018 | La Piloto | Dave Mejía | Main role |
| 2017 | Noches con Platanito | Himself | Interview for a talk show |
| 2017 | Paramédicos: Fuerza Bruta | Adrián | |
| 2015–2016 | A que no me dejas | Gastón | Recurring role; 61 episodes (season 1) |
| 2014–2015 | Muchacha italiana viene a casarse | Enrique | Guest role; 12 episodes |
| 2015 | La rosa de Guadalupe | Federico | Episode: Verdadero amor |
| 2014–2015 | Mi corazón es tuyo | Police officer | Uncredited |
| 2014 | La rosa de Guadalupe | Esteban | Episode: En medio de la lluvia |
| 2013–2014 | De que te quiero, te quiero | Extra | Uncredited |
| 2013 | La rosa de Guadalupe | Efrén | Episode: Tan azules como el amor |

== Stage ==
| Year | Title | Role | Location |
|---|---|---|---|
| 2014 | Conexión | Nacho | Micro Teatro México, México |
| 2014 | Tengamos el sexo en paz | TBD | Teatro 11 de julio, México |
| 2013 | Cuatro XXXX | Roberto | Teatro 11 de julio, México |
