= Verónica Montes =

Peruvian actress and model

- Born: 17 February 1990 (age 36); Lima, Peru
- Occupation: Actress
- Years active: 2008–present

Verónica Montes (born 17 February 1990, in Lima) is a Peruvian international actress settled in Mexico. Known mainly for her roles as "La Condesa", "Kika Braun" and "Lizbeth Álvarez" in the series "El señor de los cielos", "Papá a toda madre" and "La Piloto" respectively.

== Biography ==
Verónica Montes is granddaughter of Spaniards and daughter of Peruvians. At the age of 3 she began working in commercials and being the face of several brands.

At the age of 9 she began studying dance and acting; at 10 she went to live from Lima, Peru to Miami, United States, with her family.

She studied communications in Miami, to complete a comprehensive preparation, she took courses in singing, dancing and diction. As for her training as an actress, she received instruction from renowned figures, such as Adriana Barraza (Actress nominated for an Oscar) and Luis Mandoki (Hollywood Movies Director widely awarded), among others.

== Career ==
Her trajectory began in 2007, when she enters to the contest "Nuestra Belleza Latina", where the fact of being a finalist, earned her the opportunity to try her luck on television.

=== 2008–2012: Artistic Beginnings ===
Her debut on television was in the soap opera "Amor comprado", followed later by several soap operas that were filmed in Miami, "Perro amor", "Eva Luna", "Natalia del Mar", "Nueva Vida", "Por siempre mi amor", and "Amor sin reserva".

=== 2013–2020: Artistic Consolidation ===
In 2013 she arrived to Mexico in order to establish herself as an actress in the Mexican industry, the most important Spanish-speaking one. In 2015, she made herself known playing "La Condesa" in "El Señor de los Cielos III", paired up with Rafael Amaya, sharing credits with Fernanda Castillo and Leonardo Daniel. In 2016, she personified Lizbeth Álvarez in "La Piloto", a stewardess of the stellar cast. In 2017, she made her first comedy embodying the character of "Kika Braun" in "Papá a Toda Madre", the villain of the story, together with Maite Perroni and Sebastián Rulli. One of the few villains who have managed to be loved by the public. In 2018 she made her theater debut with the play by producer Ruben Lara, "Una Pareja de 3" starring alongside Sebastián Rulli and Gabriel Soto. She also did the characters of "Letty Vida Fit" for "40 y 20", and "Sofia" for "Nosotros los Guapos", in terms of series she did the character of "Gabriela" in "Decisiones" and finally participated in one of the most seen programs on television "Mira Quien Baila". In 2019, she played "Victoria Avila" in "Promesas de Campaña", venturing in political satires. In that same year, she starred in her first film as "Helena Moya" in "Padre se busca". In 2020 she debuted in dubbing, doing the voice of "Piernanda" in "Trolls 2" at Universal Studios. She also participates as "Sharpay" in "Parientes a la Fuerza".

=== 2021–Present: New Projects ===
She becomes protagonist in dubbing, in the movie Baby Boss 2, playing the role of "Tina Templeton". She also makes her debut on reality television in the first season of "La Casa de los Famosos".
In 2022 she was chosen to star in the first season of the television series "Amores que engañan" giving life to "Andrea". That same year she made the film "Que padre... es mi familia" antagonizing the character "Tabatha" alongside Marlene Favela, Carlos Ponce and Eduardo Yañez. At the beginning of 2023 she made a special participation for Disney in the series "Lucha".

== Filmography ==
=== Television ===
| Year | Title | Roles |
|---|---|---|
| 2008 | Amor comprado | Gertrudis |
| 2010 | Perro amor | Lena |
| 2010 | Eva Luna | Maritza Ruiz |
| 2011 | Mia | Isabella |
| 2011–2012 | Natalia del mar | Mariela |
| 2013 | Qué bonito amor | Susan Davis |
| 2013 | Nueva vida | Karina |
| 2013-2014 | Por siempre mi amor | Lucero |
| 2014 | Amor sin reserva | Rocío |
| 2014 | Quiero amarte | Silvia |
| 2015 | El señor de los cielos | Belén Guerrero de Aguilera 'La Condesa' |
| 2017 | 40 y 20 | Lety |
| 2017 | La piloto | Lizbeth Álvarez |
| 2017-2018 | Papá a toda madre | Chiquinquirá Braun 'Kika' |
| 2020 | Promesas de campaña | Victoria |
| 2020 | Decisiones: unos ganan, otros pierden | Gabriela |
| 2021-2022 | Parientes a la fuerza | Sharpay de Castro |
| 2022 | Amores que engañan | Andrea, ep: nuestro pacto |
| 2023 | El maleficio | Julia Peralta |

=== Programs ===
| Year | Title | Debut |
|---|---|---|
| 2009 | Nuestra Belleza Latina 2009 | Finalista |
| 2018 | ¡Mira Quién Baila! | Participante |
| 2021 | La casa de los famosos | Semifinalista |

=== Movies ===
| Year | Title | Character |
|---|---|---|
| 2013 | Jazive | Jazive |
| 2019 | Padre se Busca | Helena Moya |
| 2022 | Que Padre es mi familia | Tabatha |

=== Dubbing ===
| Year | Title | Character |
|---|---|---|
| 2020 | Trolls 2 | Piernanda |
| 2021 | Baby Boss 2 | Tina Templeton |

=== Conduction ===
| Year | Title |
|---|---|
| 2012 | Kids Choice Awards 2012 |
| 2012 | Premios Juventud 2012 |
| 2012 | La jugada |
