= Tommy Vásquez =

Colombian actor

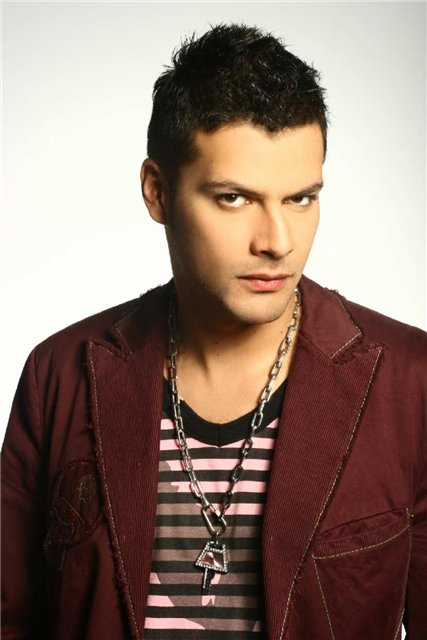
- Born: Tommy Daniel Vásquez Castro; February 3, 1981 (age 44); Bogotá, Colombia
- Years active: 1999–present
- Children: 1

Tommy Daniel Vásquez Castro (born February 3, 1981, in Bogotá, Colombia), more commonly known by his stage name Tommy Vásquez, is a Colombian actor.

== Filmography ==
=== Films ===
Year	Title	Role	Notes
1999	Some Place New	Hispanic Cop	Film debut
2007	Harvest of Redemption	Don Alberto Longoria	
2008	Deadland Dreaming	Shine	

=== Television ===
Year	Title	Role	Notes
2004	Dora, la celadora	Julio	
2008	La traición	Fabio Sandino	
2008	La quiero a morir	Stalin Pulido	
2009–10	El Capo	Umaña	"Pilot" (Season 1, Episode 1); "Finale" (Season 1, Episode 90)
2010	El cartel	Capitán Harvey Racines	
2010	Tu Voz Estéreo	Arleth Castillo	"Del Campo a la ciudad" (Season 6, Episode 59)
2011	La Mariposa	Francisco Altagracia	
2012	Pablo Escobar, The Drug Lord	Fabio Urrea	"Las lecciones de Doña Enelia" (Season 1, Episode 1)
2013	Comando Elite	Capitán Arturo Correa	
2013–16	El Señor de los Cielos	Álvaro José Pérez "Tijeras"	
2015	Esmeraldas	Eduardo Guerrero	
2017	La Piloto	Coronel Arnoldo Santamaría	Main Antagonist
2018	Undercover Law	Coyote	
2021	La negociadora	Magín	

== Awards and nominations ==
Year	Awards	Category	Recipient	Outcome
2015	Sol de Oro Awards	Best Supporting Actor	El Señor de los Cielos	Won
2015	2015 Premios Tu Mundo	Best Supporting Actor: Series	El Señor de los Cielos	Won
