= Alejandro Nones =

Venezuelan actor and model (born 1982)

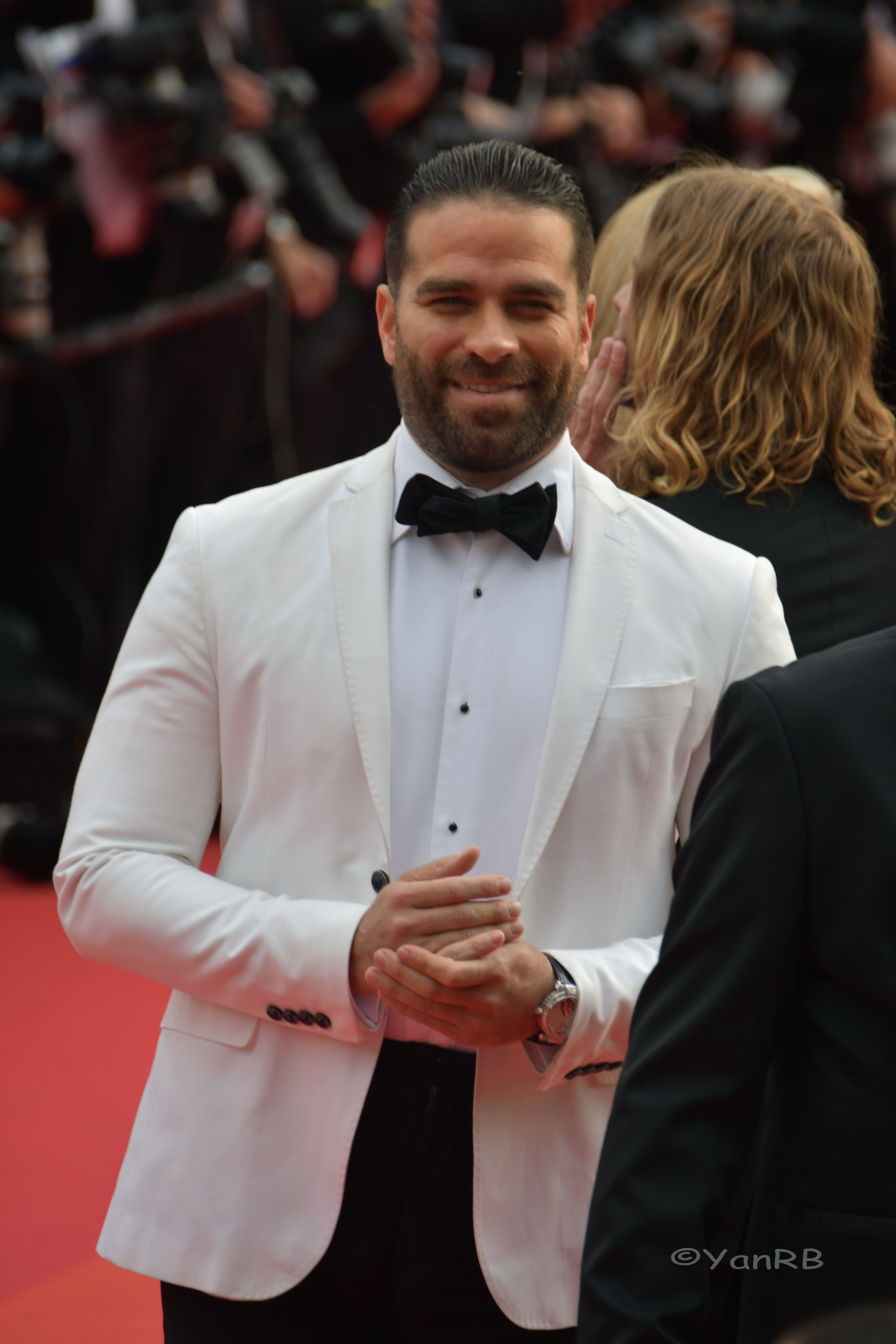
- Born: December 9, 1982 (age 43); Caracas, Venezuela
- Occupations: Actor, model

Alejandro Nones (born December 9, 1982) is a Venezuelan actor. He began his acting career with the film Así del precipicio, and later was hired by Televisa to act in the telenovela Lola, érase una vez.

== Filmography ==
Films
Year	Title	Roles	Notes
2006	Así del precipicio	Mathías	
2009	Me importas tú, y tú	Ismael	
2014	Deliver Us	Son	Video short
TBA	Lo que podríamos ser	Michael García	Post-production

Television
Year	Title	Roles	Notes
2007	Lola, érase una vez	Waldo López	
2007	RBD: La familia	Erick	"¿De verdad son besos de mentira?" (Season 1, Episode 1)
2007–08	Palabra de mujer	Octavio Longoria	
2009	Los simuladores		"Cita a ciegas" (Season 2, Episode 2)
2010	Zacatillo, un lugar en tu corazón	Julio	Recurring role
2010	Teresa	Paulo	Supporting role
2011	Amorcito Corazón	Rubén	"El Engaño" (Season 1, Episode 1); "Primer encuentro" (Season 1, Episode 2)
2012–2023	Corona de lágrimas	Patricio Chavero	Supporting role
2015–16	Pasión y poder	Erick Montenegro	
2017	La Piloto	Óscar Lucio	Main cast (season 1)
2018	Mi lista de exes	Poncho	Episode: El Chacal
2018–19	Amar a muerte	Johny Corona	Main cast
2021	Malverde: El Santo Patrón	Nazario Aguilar	Main role
2021	Who Killed Sara?	Rodolfo Lazcano	Main role
2023	Pacto de sangre	Benjamín	Main role
