= Mauricio Aspe =

Mexican actor

- Born: Edgar Mauricio Aspe López; July 25, 1973 (age 51); Mexico City, D.F., Mexico
- Occupation(s): Actor, model
- Years active: 1994-present
- Spouses: Margarita Magaña (m. 2000–2004) Jenniffer Queipo (m. 2012)
- Children: Shakti Aspe Magaña (b. 2000) Kala Aspe Queipo (2015)

Mauricio Aspe (born Edgar Mauricio Aspe López on July 25, 1973, in Mexico City, Mexico) is a Mexican actor.

== Biography ==
=== Career ===
He began as a child model before emerging as an actor at age 17, when he joined the school of acting of Televisa to become an actor. His first acting role was in Maria la del Barrio, where he shared credits with Mexican singer/actress, Thalía. Since then he has worked in various telenovelas mainly produced by Televisa. His most recent acting roles include, La Madrastra, Las Dos Caras de Ana and Querida Enemiga, a telenovela produced by Televisa.

=== Personal life ===
He was married to also actress Margarita Magaña with whom he has one child, a daughter called Shakti (b. 2000). In 2012 married again with Jenniffer Queipo and has another daughter called Kala (b.2015)

== Filmography ==
Telenovelas, Series
Year	Title	Role	Notes
1994-95	Agujetas de color de rosa		Guest star
1995-96	María la del Barrio	Aldo Armenteros	Supporting role
1996	Azul	Roberto	Supporting role
1996	La culpa	Toño	Supporting role
1997	Amada enemiga	Jorge Pruneda	Supporting role
1998	Preciosa	El Gasolina	Supporting role
1999	Por tu amor	René Higueras Ledesma	
1999	¿Qué nos pasa?		TV series
1999-00	Cuento de Navidad		TV mini-series
2000	La casa en la playa	Gino Morali	Supporting role
2000-01	Primer amor, a mil por hora	Rodolfo "Rudy"	Supporting role
2000-01	Carita de Ángel	Saturno	Supporting role
2000-01	Por un beso	Anselmo	Supporting role
2002	Entre el Amor y el Odio	Tobías Morán	Supporting role
2004	Amarte es mi Pecado	Rafael Almazán Miranda	Supporting role
2005	La Madrastra	Héctor San Román Fernández	Supporting role
2006	Mi vida eres tú	Ricardo	Supporting role
2006-07	Las dos caras de Ana	Ignacio Bustamante	Main role
2007-08	Madre Luna	Román Garrido	Main role
2008	Querida Enemiga	Lic. Arturo Sabogal Huerta	Supporting role
2008-09	Cuidado con el ángel	Raúl Soto	Guest star
2009	Sortilegio	Fabián Lombardo	Guest star
2009	Mujeres Asesinas 2		Episode: "Julia, encubridora"
2009	Tiempo final (Fox) 3		Episode: "Testigo"
2009	Adictos	Eduardo "Edy" Ponce	TV series
2010-11	Entre el amor y el deseo	Marcio García/Marcio Márquez	Main role
2012	La mujer de Judas	Ernesto Yuñez	Supporting role
2014	Las Bravo	Patricio Castro	Supporting role
2015	Ruta 35	Gavilán	Supporting role
2017	La Piloto	Arley Mena	Main role
2019	Soltero con hijas	Mauricio Mijares	
2024	Vivir de amor	Armando Cienfuegos	
2025	Me atrevo a amarte	Father Juan Diego	

== Awards and nominations ==
Year	Award	Category	Telenovela	Result
2006	Premios TVyNovelas	Best Young Lead Actor	La Madrastra	Won
2007	Premios TVyNovelas	Best Male Antagonist	Las dos caras de Ana	Nominated
