= María de la Fuente =

Mexican actress

- Born: February 9, 1977 (age 49); Mexico City, Mexico
- Occupations: Actress, model
- Years active: 2005–present
- Partner(s): Plutarco Haza (2008-2010); Maximiliano Villegas (?-present)
- Children: Victoria & Oliver Villegas de la Fuente
- Parent(s): Carlos de la Fuente; Sofía de de la Fuente
- Relatives: Carlos & Amadeo (brothers)

María de la Fuente (born February 9, 1977, in Mexico City, Mexico) is a Mexican actress.

She began her studies of acting preparation in the Actoral Training Center of TV Azteca. Her career began has intervened in several television commercials, apart from her small roles in television.

In 2008, she participates in telenovela Pobre rico, pobre. In 2010 she acts beside of Christian Bach in telenovela Vidas robadas.

In 2017 returns in television at the telenovela La Piloto.

== Filmography ==
Year	Title	Role	Notes
2005	Top Models	Celeste Osuna	Recurring role
2006	Amor en custodia		Recurring role
2006	Amores cruzados		Recurring role
2007	Bellezas Indomables	Roxana de Castañeda	Supporting role
2008	Pobre rico, pobre	Liseth	Recurring role
2010	Vidas robadas	Lorena Álvarez	Supporting role
2010	Sex express coffee		Film
2012	Chiapas, el corazón del café	Emily	Film
2012	Quererte así	Perla Ramírez Vda. de Santos	Supporting role
2012	Los Rey	Dr. Rosario Deschamps	Supporting role
2017	La Piloto	Mónica Ortega	Supporting role
2017	La fuerza de creer		
