= Stephanie Salas =

Mexican singer and actress (born 1970)

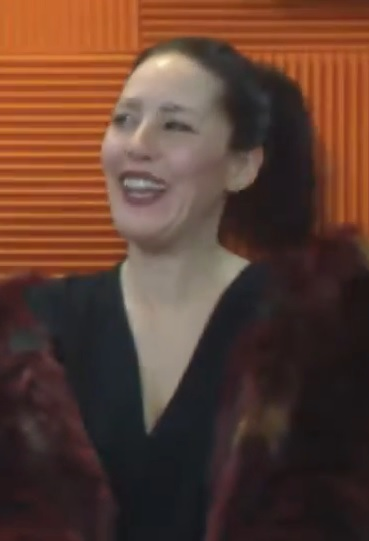

Background information
- Born: Stephanie Salas Banquells; February 5, 1970 (age 56); Mexico City, Mexico
- Genre: Pop
- Occupations: Singer; actress
- Years active: 1992–present
- Labels: Melody (1992–1994); MW (2006–present)
- Partners: Luis Miguel (1988–1989); Pablo Valero (1996–1997); Humberto Zurita (2022-present)

Stephanie Salas Banquells (born February 15, 1970) is a Mexican singer and actress. She was born into one of the most famous show business families in all of Mexico. She is the daughter of actress Silvia Pasquel and musician Micky Salas; she is the granddaughter of actress Silvia Pinal and actor Rafael Banquells; and she is the niece of singers Alejandra Guzmán and Rocío Banquells.

== Life and career ==
Salas made her show business debut singing at age eight alongside her mother on the show Noche a noche hosted by Verónica Castro. She later joined the cast of Vaselina, the Spanish-language state production of Grease, alongside Timbiriche. At age 16 she was asked to join the cast of the telenovela El precio de la fama by producer Ernesto Alonso.

In 1992 Salas starred alongside Bibi Gaytán, Paulina Rubio and Eduardo Capetillo in the popular telenovela Baila Conmigo. She sang several songs on the musical oriented youth soap. Her most popular was the song "Tonterias". This led to her signing a contract with Televisa owned label Melody.

That same year Salas released her debut album, entitled Ave María. The title track (written by Lolita De La Colina) became a huge hit in Mexico and in parts of Latin America. Produced by Oscar López, the album went on to achieve gold status in Mexico.

Salas's follow-up came in 1994 with La raza humana. This album received critical praise, though compared to its predecessor it was not a huge commercial success. However, the album did receive the prestigious Palmas de oro which is given to the year's best in music by Mexican music critics. Of note were the songs "Corazón", which saw Salas dabble in house music, and "Nube", which was inspired by Nirvana leader Kurt Cobain's untimely death. This album also featured many collaborations with Salas's partner Pablo Valero (former member of Santa Sabina), with whom she had her youngest daughter. She had her oldest daughter with singer Luis Miguel.

For the latter part of the 90s Salas took time off to raise her two daughters. While she was pretty dormant on the music front, she did find time to continue acting. She left Televisa briefly and participated in several telenovelas for competing network TV Azteca such as El candidato and Agua y aceite.

Salas participated in the Spanish language version of Eve Ensler's Vagina Monologues. The Mexican production of this play has been running for over seven years, has toured all of Mexico, and has been performed over 3,500 times. Her other theatrical productions include Mame, Mi vida es mi vida, and El protagonista.

Having not released any music since 1994, Salas returned to the music scene in late 2006 with a new project entitled Tuna. She and musician Pepe Acosta, released their self-titled debut on the Mexican independent label MW Records. The band was previously named "Tinta" but had to change its name due to legal issues.

== Discography ==
- 1992: Ave María
- 1994: La Raza Humana
- 1998: Un mundo una esperanza
- 2006: Tuna
- 2012: Soy Lo Que Soy

== Filmography ==
- 2026: Top Chef VIP .... Herself (Contestant)
- 2016: Como dice el dicho .... Gaby
- 2007: Mejor es que Gabriela no se muera .... Eva
- 2004: Avisos de ocasión .... Graciela
- 2002: Agua y aceite .... Leticia
- 2001: Lo que callamos las mujeres .... Adalí
- 1999: El candidato .... Perla Santoyo
- 1995: Ocho malditos
- 1995: Mujer, casos de la vida real (8 episodes, 1995–2004)
- 1992: Modelo antiguo .... Carmen, Joven
- 1992: Baila Conmigo .... Clara/Clarissa
- 1991: Mí querido viejo
- 1991: Jóvenes delincuentes
- 1990: Al filo de la muerte .... Pilar
- 1989: Verano sangriento
- 1987: El precio de la fama .... Sonia
