= El Señor de los Cielos season 7 =

Season of the Spanish-language network Telemundo

El Señor de los Cielos
- Season 7
- Starring: Matías Novoa; Carmen Aub; Iván Arana; Isabella Castillo; Robinson Díaz; Eduardo Santamarina; Guy Ecker; Danna García; Ninel Conde
- No. of episodes: 75

Release
- Original network: Telemundo
- Original release: 14 October 2019 – 31 January 2020

Season chronology
- ← Previous; Season 6 Next → Season 8

The seventh season of the American television series El Señor de los Cielos was confirmed by Telemundo in May 2018. It aired from 14 October 2019 to 31 January 2020.

The season stars Matías Novoa, Carmen Aub, Iván Arana, and Isabella Castillo as Casillas' dynasty members, alongside Robinson Díaz, Guy Ecker, and Ninel Conde. It features the inclusion of Danna García in the main cast, and the promotion of Eduardo Santamarina to the main cast. Unlike the previous season, Lisa Owen, Alberto Guerra, Alejandro López, Fernando Noriega and Roberto Escobar were removed from the main cast, while Rafael Amaya only appears as a special guest star.

== Plot ==
In season seven, to avoid falling into the hands of the American Justice, Amado Leal "El Águila Azul", now Amado Casillas, has turned himself in to Bernardo Castillo, Secretary of Security of Mexico. The DEA commissioner, Joe Navarro, has made every attempt to achieve his extradition. What he does not know is that Baltazar Ojeda, a CIA Agent, has the plan to eliminate Amado before, since he is the only one who can prove that within the organization in which both worked together, there is a scheme of corruption and murky management that endangers its existence within it and its freedom. He has already been transferred to a jail on the outskirts of the State of Mexico and is about to be taken to the airport, under strict security measures when the Casillas cartel tries to rescue him and Baltazar Ojeda himself tries to kill him. In the midst of this tension and in parallel, under the supervision of Doña Alba and a specialized doctor, they try a risky procedure to revive Aurelio.

== Episodes ==
No. overall	No. in season	Title	Original release date	US viewers (millions)
537	1	"Nace una leyenda"	14 October 2019	1.99
While Doña Alba struggles to revive Aurelio Casillas, the Casillas seize the city to try to free Amado, allying himself with great enemies and facing the government of Mexico and the United States.
538	2	"Amor y guerra"	15 October 2019	1.67
The government has the Casillas surrounded, but they will not be easy prey and will show those who intend to eliminate them that they are indestructible. Pío plots his revenge against Super Javi.
539	3	"La liberación"	16 October 2019	1.55
Amado's rescue fails and the American government moves him to the United States. The Casillas come up with a escape plan, but the operation is high risk. Javi receives unexpected news.
540	4	"La sombra del pasado"	18 October 2019	1.52
Pío José Valdivia, the most dangerous enemy of the Casillas, begins to execute his revenge to eliminate them one by one and the first on his list is Super Javi.
541	5	"Negocios en Grecia"	21 October 2019	1.50
Amado and Diana arrive in Greece looking for new allies to strengthen the Casillas Cartel, but the Balkan mafia has other intentions.
542	6	"El Cartel de los Balcanes"	22 October 2019	1.26
Amado seeks a meeting with Renzo Volpi to do business, without imagining that the leader of the Balcanes will make a request that will put him against the wall.
543	7	"Los Casillas de luto"	23 October 2019	1.30
Doña Alba decides to bury Aurelio with his brother Chacorta. But her grandchildren have other plans and when she finds out, she explodes in rage. Esther declares war on her daughter Diana.
544	8	"Nace el Cartel Casillas"	24 October 2019	1.59
The Casillas give the last goodbye with all the honors to Aurelio. With his death, they strengthen and the cartel is born with more power. Amado and Diana end their relationship.
545	9	"La noticia bomba"	25 October 2019	1.36
Los Casillas send a shocking message to the entire world. Now their enemies prepare an attack plan to eliminate each member of the new cartel.
546	10	"Un tesoro en el fondo del mar"	28 October 2019	1.31
Amado plans to use the loot he found with Athina to free her and her family from the debt she owes to Volpi. The gangster gives him an ultimatum. Los Casillas prepare their return.
547	11	"Desacuerdo peligroso"	29 October 2019	1.23
Amado and Volpi do not reach an agreement so a new war begins. The attacks do not wait and a member of the Casillas family is in the sights of the enemy.
548	12	"Los Casillas en alerta"	30 October 2019	1.24
Amado realizes that Luz Marina is in danger and notifies the family. Los Casillas warn her, but she refuses to be protected. Chema is willing to kill Navarro.
549	13	"El Chema contra la DEA"	31 October 2019	1.28
Chema is willing to kill Agent Navarro anyway. He uses Ámbar as bait and attacks mercilessly, not caring that she may end up dead. Amado wants to eliminate Volpi.
550	14	"Un regalo mortífero"	1 November 2019	1.27
Los Casillas discover that Dylan is behind Chema and try to warn him. But it's too late, Pío already has it in his sights. Amado remembers his time in the war with Volpi.
551	15	"Un mensaje de los Balcanes"	4 November 2019	1.20
Volpi insists on pressing Amado to deal with the Fentanilo, but this time he does it with his worst enemy, Ojeda. Athina and Nikos celebrate their daughter's wedding and the enemy appears.
552	16	"Ojo por ojo"	5 November 2019	1.22
Amado is worried about the life of his niece and is forced to accept the conditions of Renzo Volpi, even after knowing how cold and brutal it can be. Ismael and Rutila argue.
553	17	"Hija de tigre pintita"	6 November 2019	1.30
Rutila decides to act on her own, behind her family's back, to rescue her sister Luzma. But an obstacle arises on its way to Switzerland.
554	18	"Los Casillas no perdonan"	7 November 2019	1.27
In the best style of Aurelio, the Casillas' Cartel counterattacks its enemies. Pío José and Ojeda pay the consequences. Ámbar conspires against the Cuban and Venezuelan governments.
555	19	"La caricia de la serpiente"	8 November 2019	1.18
Renzo and Amado declare war. The leader of the Balcanes gives the order to Ojeda to bring Diana Ahumada to give the next blow to his enemy. Pío tries to escape from the authorities.
556	20	"Los Balcanes en México"	11 November 2019	1.24
Volpi arrives in Mexico ready to have control of the territory of the Casillas. As part of its strategy, it seeks alliance with the cartel closest to its enemy. Diana faces her mother.
557	21	"Peligrosa alianza"	12 November 2019	1.22
Chema comes to meet with the Chinese cartel to do business and meets the main enemy of the Casillas, who asks for an alliance to get them out of the game.
558	22	"Caen las máscaras"	13 November 2019	1.28
Rutila discovers that El Cabo is still alive, after the last confrontation with Los Casillas. Now she manages to find him and plans to permanently eliminate him.
559	23	"El Chema vs. Amado"	14 November 2019	1.07
Amado faces El Chema when he learns that he is negotiating with his main enemy. This causes a confrontation between both cartels that ends in pure violence.
560	24	"Con el diablo no se juega"	15 November 2019	1.26
Pío José wants to recover the 300 kilos of cocaine that Diana stole from him and in order to do so he sends to kidnap his mother and sister. But it is he who takes the surprise of his life.
561	25	"El arte de la guerra"	18 November 2019	1.28
Los Casillas celebrate the wedding of Doña Alba and El Pulque, but not everything is joy when they hear about alarming news on television.
562	26	"La DEA detrás de El Chema"	19 November 2019	1.14
Chema is played in Colombia to get a large amount of drugs. Navarro has the capo located and coordinates an operation for his capture. Amado has a bad feeling.
563	27	"Provocación directa"	20 November 2019	1.30
Governor Ahumuda publicly accuses Pío José of being El Cabo and he goes for her to eliminate her. But the enemies of the Colombian arrive at the same time and a shooting takes place.
564	28	"Con el enemigo en la mira"	21 November 2019	1.34
Diana tells her sister that she will soon be with her mother. Castillo manages to intercept the call and set up an operation to capture Los Casillas and rescue the governor.
565	29	"La venganza de Pío Valdivia"	22 November 2019	1.24
Los Casillas make an alliance with the DEA to deliver to the governor. Pío seizes the moment, making Jaime deliver it to him in a silver tray. Navarro pacts with Ámbar and Edith.
566	30	"Cara a cara"	25 November 2019	1.21
The governor thinks that she is already far from the danger of Colombians. But Jaime tells Pio that they are heading to Coahuila so he can execute his revenge. Chema receives bad news.
567	31	"La muerte acecha"	26 November 2019	1.28
568	32	"La furia de Diana"	27 November 2019	1.31
569	33	"El indetenible Pío"	2 December 2019	1.29
570	34	"Nuevas reglas del juego"	3 December 2019	1.23
571	35	"Empieza la cacería del Chema"	4 December 2019	1.14
572	36	"Venegas acorralado"	5 December 2019	1.28
573	37	"Unos ganan y otros pierden"	6 December 2019	1.17
574	38	"Una enemiga poderosa"	9 December 2019	1.26
575	39	"Rebelión en familia"	10 December 2019	1.07
576	40	"La revancha"	11 December 2019	1.00
577	41	"Una pista de La Coronela"	12 December 2019	1.03
578	42	"Una fuerte lección"	13 December 2019	0.99
579	43	"La ocasión perfecta"	16 December 2019	1.04
580	44	"Masacre en La Condesa"	17 December 2019	1.13
581	45	"Rey muerto, rey puesto"	18 December 2019	1.09
582	46	"Los siguientes en la lista"	19 December 2019	0.99
583	47	"Fiesta de narcos"	20 December 2019	0.94
584	48	"Muerte o cárcel"	23 December 2019	1.06
585	49	"Lucha contra el narco"	25 December 2019	0.82
586	50	"Los tiene bien puestos"	26 December 2019	0.98
587	51	"Con los Casillas nadie se mete"	27 December 2019	1.03
588	52	"Vivo o muerto"	30 December 2019	1.04
589	53	"La suerte de Evelina"	1 January 2020	0.96
590	54	"Terror y melancolía"	2 January 2020	1.12
591	55	"Los Casillas al asecho"	3 January 2020	1.01
592	56	"Amenazas y alianzas"	6 January 2020	1.00
593	57	"Demencia"	7 January 2020	1.06
594	58	"Víctima de abuso"	8 January 2020	1.08
595	59	"Dalila en la mira"	9 January 2020	1.04
596	60	"Prueba de fuego"	10 January 2020	0.97
597	61	"Plan estratégico"	13 January 2020	1.08
598	62	"Amor a prueba"	14 January 2020	1.08
599	63	"Junta de enemigos"	15 January 2020	1.16
600	64	"Tracción entre socios"	16 January 2020	1.14
601	65	"Lluvia de fuego"	17 January 2020	1.03
602	66	"Nadie perdona a nadie"	20 January 2020	1.18
603	67	"Contraataque mortal"	21 January 2020	1.14
604	68	"Sin piedad"	22 January 2020	1.20
605	69	"La dura verdad"	23 January 2020	1.16
606	70	"Las estrategia de los Casillas"	24 January 2020	1.11
607	71	"Al ataque"	27 January 2020	1.17
608	72	"Cinco minutos para salir"	28 January 2020	1.12
609	73	"Acorralado"	29 January 2020	1.25
610	74	"El dolor de los Casillas"	30 January 2020	1.24
611	75	"Ver la muerte"	31 January 2020	1.32

== Cast and characters ==
=== Main ===
- Matías Novoa as Amado Casillas "El Águila Azul"
- Carmen Aub as Rutila Casillas
- Iván Arana as Ismael Casillas
- Isabella Castillo as Diana Ahumada
- Robinson Díaz as Miltón Jiménez "El Cabo" / Pío José Valdivia
- Eduardo Santamarina as Balthazar Ojeda
- Guy Ecker as Joe Navarro
- Danna García as Violeta Estrella
- Ninel Conde as Evelina López

=== Recurring ===
- Lisa Owen as Alba Casillas
- Manuel Landeta as Cecilio Guiterrez
- Alberto Guerra as El Chema
- Alejandro López as El Súper Javi
- Nacho Fresneda as Renzo Volpi
- Fernando Noriega as Eutemio Flores "El Rojo"
- Julián Román as Joaquín Estrella
- Thali García as Berenice Ahumada
- Dayana Garroz as Ámbar Maldonado
- Alan Slim as Jaime Ernesto Rosales
- Claudia Lobo as Esther
- Alosian Vivancos as Dylan Gutiérrez "Dj Dylan"
- Marisela Berti as Edith Guzmán
- Daniel Martínez as Guillermo Colón
- José Sedek as Bernardo Castillo
- Roberto Escobar as Comandante José Valdés
- Athina Klioum as Athina
- Coraima Torres as Rita Peña
- Elsy Reyes as Carla Uzcátegui
- Mabel Moreno as Alejandra
- Camila Jurado as Ángela
- Karla Carrillo as Corina Saldaña / Salma Vidal
- Karen Sandoval as Laura
- Denia Agalianou as Dalila Zuc
- Leonardo Álvarez as Leonardo Castaño
- Daniel Martínez Campos as Arístides Istúriz
- Renata Manterola as Luzma Casillas
- David Ponce as José Manrique "Skinny"
- Carlos Puente as Pompeyo
- Fernando Banda as El Vitaminas
- Daniel Rascón as El Toro
- Antonio López Torres as El Pulque
- Alejandro Navarrete as El Zopilote
- Alex Walerstein as Paul "El Greñas"
- Alejandro Félix as Chatarrero
- Carlos Balderrama as José Manuel Castillo "Manny"
- Rubén Arciniegas as Samario
- Gabriel Bonilla as Isidro Casillas
- Yannis Spaliaras as Nikos
- Christina Sotiriou as Irene
- Plutarco Haza as Dalvio Navarrete "El Ingeniero"
- Lupita Jones as Amaranta Reyes

=== Guest stars ===
- Rafael Amaya as Aurelio Casillas

== Reception ==
The series premiered on 14 October 2019 with a total of 1.99 million viewers, including 1.1 million adults aged 18–49. It surpassed Univision's El Dragón: Return of a Warrior and became Telemundo's most-watched program of the year, only above La Reina del Sur, despite having had a successful premiere; the series failed to reach two million viewers as in previous seasons. After actor Rafael Amaya left the series, the audience began to decrease markedly with each episode, before this, several followers threatened Telemundo that they would stop watching the series.

== Production ==
On 10 May 2018, Telemundo announced that the series has been renewed for a seventh season. The production of the season began on 27 May 2019 in Mexico, and concluded in September 2019. The season is produced by Argos Comunicación for Telemundo Global Studios, and it was recorded entirely in Mexico, and some places in Greece.

=== Casting ===
After having been present at the Telemundo Upfront for the 2019-2020 television season, and having been present in the season trailer. Gala Montes, who previously participated in two previous seasons playing Luzma Casillas, confirmed that she left the series due to unconformity with the script of her character. On 21 June 2019, it was confirmed that Venezuelan actress Coraima Torres would be part of the season. On 16 July 2019, Jesús Moré who played Omar Terán confirmed his departure from the series and said "I think it's a good decision, I think the character gave what he had to give in the sixth season. What not did Omar Terán? I touched some climax peaks, of vices ... I think the character gave many things and as an actor he enriched me infinitely." On 24 July 2019, Matías Novoa confirmed his participation in the season together with Rafael Amaya, who had left the series in the previous season. Later after having started the production of the season, Amaya stopped appearing on the set of the production, something that Telemundo did not clarify. On 11 August 2019, Plutarco Haza's return to the season was confirmed. On 14 August 2019, People en Español magazine confirmed that Isabella Castillo, Carmen Aub, Karla Carrillo, Iván Arana, Fernando Noriega, Alejandro López, Álex Walerstein, Ninel Conde, Dayana Garroz, and Alberto Guerra would be back in the season.

On 16 September 2019, People en Español magazine reported that Danna García would join the cast of the season as Violeta, along with Rubén Arciniegas. Subsequently, on 17 September 2019, the magazine confirmed the return of Eduardo Santamarina, Robinson Díaz, and Fernando Noriega to the season, as well as the inclusion of new characters such as Manuel Landeta, and Julián Román among others. Although it was confirmed that Rafael Amaya would be in the seventh season, during the season's premiere; Telemundo confirmed that his character died.

=== Promotion ===
On 9 September 2019, Telemundo began promoting the seventh season through its official Instagram account. However, the teaser that lasts less than a minute does not clearly show if Rafael Amaya will be present during the season. On 12 September 2019, the first advance of the season was shown, where Amaya appears.
