= El Señor de los Cielos season 6 =

El Señor de los Cielos
- Season 6
- Promotional poster
- Starring: Rafael Amaya; Carmen Aub; Robinson Díaz; Guy Ecker; Alberto Guerra; Alejandro López; Francisco Gattorno; Jesús Moré; Lisa Owen; Miguel Varoni; Ninel Conde; Carlos Bardem; Isabella Castillo; Roberto Escobar; María Conchita Alonso; Iván Arana; Fernando Noriega
- No. of episodes: 99

Release
- Original network: Telemundo
- Original release: 8 May – 24 September 2018

Season chronology
- ← Previous; Season 5 Next → Season 7

The sixth season of El Señor de los Cielos, an American television series created by Luis Zelkowicz, that premiered on Telemundo on May 8, 2018 and concluded on 24 September 2018.

The season was ordered in May 2017.

== Synopsis ==
Aurelio Casillas recovered all the lost fortune and finally feels the need to retire. But it is time for retribution, the hatred that he sowed since he sold his soul to the drug trafficking demon is now knocking on his door with the face and blood of the many innocent people he destroyed. Aurelio will understand that his riches are an illusion, and that after being the great hunter he was, he will now become the prey. The women he mistreated, the men he betrayed, the political puppets he put in power, and even his own children will turn against him.

== Cast ==
=== Main ===
- Rafael Amaya as Aurelio Casillas
- Carmen Aub as Rutila Casillas
- Robinson Díaz as El Cabo
- Guy Ecker as Joe Navarro
- Alberto Guerra as El Chema Venegas
- Alejandro López as El Súper Javi
- Francisco Gattorno as Gustavo Casasola
- Jesús Moré as Omar Terán Robles
- Lisa Owen as Alba Casillas
- Miguel Varoni as Leandro Quezada
- Ninel Conde as Evelina López
- Carlos Bardem as El Chivo Ahumada
- Isabella Castillo as Diana Ahumada
- Roberto Escobar as Comandante José Valdés
- María Conchita Alonso as Nora Requena
- Iván Arana as Ismael Casillas
- Fernando Noriega as El Rojo Flores
- Hector Bonilla as El Rayo López
- Matías Novoa as Amado Leal "El Águila Azul"

=== Recurring ===
- Aracely Arambula as Altagracia Sandoval
- Eduardo Santamarina as Baltazar Ojeda
- Dayana Garroz as Ámbar Maldonado
- Karla Carrillo as Corina Saldaña / Salma Vidal
- Juanita Arias as Kashi
- Gloria Stalina as Milena
- Daniel Martínez as Guillermo Colón
- Marina de Tavira as Begoña Barraza
- Alan Slim as Jaime Ernesto Rosales
- Marisela Berti as Edith Guzmán
- Claudia Lobo as Esther
- Karen Sandoval as Laura
- Rafael Uribe as Coronel Garañón
- Gastón Velandia as Figueroa
- Daniel Martínez Campo as Arístides Istúriz
- Carlos Serrato as Mocho
- David Ponce as Skinny
- Elsy Reyes as Carla Uzcátegui
- Carlos Gallardo as Carlos Zuleta
- Alieth Vargas as Susana
- Fernando Banda as El Vitaminas
- José Sedek as Bernardo Castillo
- Daniela Zavala as Arelis Mendoza
- Pahola Escalera as Paulina Ugalde
- Alejandro Félix as Chatarrero
- Carlos Puente as Pompeyo
- Alex Walerstein as El Greñas
- Alejandro Navarrete as El Zopilote
- Antonio López Torres as El Pulque
- Rubén Arciniegas as Samario
- Citlali Galindo as Mayra Rodríguez
- Gabriel Bonilla as Isidro Casillas
- Thali García as Berenice Ahumada
- Leonardo Álvarez as Leonardo Venegas
- Daniel Rascón as El Toro
- Carlos Balderrama as Manny
- Aquiles Cervantes as Matamoros

== Production ==
=== Casting ===
On March 30, 2018 People en Español magazine confirmed the first confirmed actors for the season, which are Rafael Amaya, Carmen Aub, Iván Arana, Lisa Owen, Alejandro López, and Jesús Moré. This season features the return of Robinson Díaz as El Cabo, and new cast members including María Conchita Alonso, Juana Arias, Carlos Bardem, Isabella Castillo, Ninel Conde, Guy Ecker, Alberto Guerra, Thali García, Dayana Garroz, Francisco Gattorno, and Fernando Noriega, among others.

After Mauricio Ochmann announced that he would no longer playing El Chema, actor Alberto Guerra joins the series with the same character as Ochmann.

== Reception ==
The premiere of the sixth season was watched by 2.14 million viewers, which made Telemundo position itself as the Spanish-language network most watched at 10pm/9c, thus outperforming its Por amar sin ley competition, that it only obtained a total of 1.44 million viewers. After the good reception obtained by the first two episodes of the season, Telemundo renewed the series for a seventh season during the Upfront for the 2018–19 television season.

== Episodes ==
| No. overall | No. in season | Title | Original release date | US viewers (millions) |
|---|---|---|---|---|
| 438 | 1 | "A la caza de Aurelio Casillas" | 8 May 2018 | 2.14 |
After spending a few days with Javier, Rutila tells him that he must travel to Mexico since he can not be at peace until he has heard from his family. For his part, Aurelio, along with his new lover, face a large group of men trying to get out of the jungle and Alba and Ismael try to defend themselves against some of the subjects that pursue them. After observing an interview, Omar tells his friend that Aurelio Casillas is really alive and for this he will take care of giving some statements so that he comes out of hiding and puts his face once and for all. Upon returning to Mexico, El Cabo devises a plan to enter the house of his enemy and after driving away his people, he is in charge of inspecting the whole place in order to take everything he can.
| 439 | 2 | "Casillas declara la guerra" | 9 May 2018 | 2.05 |
Upon reaching the news, Aurelio asks Uzcátegui to let him speak in front of his cameras and after accepting this proposal, Aurelio tells all his compatriots the deal he made with Omar so that he would become the president of the Nation. Meanwhile El Cabo and its partners meet to celebrate; but just at that moment they observe their enemy giving some statements on television, where he affirms that he will not let himself be intimidated by the Colombians. Corina meets with Colón to tell her that he heard a conversation from Aurelio where he said that the person who attacked him was Leandro Quezada. Upon learning of the appearance of Casillas, Castillo and Colón are responsible for mounting an operation to capture it once and for all.
| 440 | 3 | "Casillas encierra a su amante" | 10 May 2018 | 1.73 |
Upon hearing to Corina reveal that she is a special agent of the DEA, Aurelio asks for an explanation and she tells him that she is willing to work as a double agent offering to be his eyes and ears within the organization. On the other hand, Javier is helped by some people who observed the accident and Maldonado tells Leandro that Aurelio appeared in a newscast giving some statements against the president and also accused him of having been responsible for the attack that his family suffered. Greñas tells Doña Alba that her grandson is very ill after losing Carmen and her nephews. When meeting with the President, Castillo proposes to him that they use Uzcátegui to find Aurelio's whereabouts.
| 441 | 4 | "Atacan a Casillas y a Rutila" | 11 May 2018 | 1.70 |
Rutila communicates with her grandmother to tell her that they will be in Colombia for a couple of days while they manage to find Javier's whereabouts; but just at that moment the Casillas and their people are attacked by the men of Leandro Quezada. After talking with Uzcátegui, Jaime looks for Omar to ask him to release her once and for all as i can not reach any agreement with this journalist. Mayra communicates with her partner to tell her how things are going in los Pinos without realizing that Zuleta was listening to he everything all. El Cabo seeks Jaime to ask him for a very important favor since he needs to speak as soon as possible with the President of the Republic or else his most intimate secrets would be revealed.
| 442 | 5 | "Casillas y Cabo crean alianzas" | 14 May 2018 | 1.69 |
After helping Aurelio not to be killed by the men of Quezada, Amber asks him if he arrived in Colombia because of the Coltal issue. Elsewhere, the doctor tells Ismael that the wounds he received are very serious and he is trying to do everything possible so that he does not need to be transferred to a hospital. Zuleta warns Mayra that if she talks to her couple about what happened between them, her whole family would pay the consequences. Jaime communicates with El Cabo to tell him that his efforts were in vain since the President does not want to meet with him, much less have any kind of dealings. After obtaining information from Corina, El Greñas realizes that this woman was in jail and also lied to them with her real name.
| 443 | 6 | "Bloquean a Casillas" | 15 May 2018 | 1.69 |
After remembering some things from her past, Corina confesses to Rutila and Aurelio that she was the last woman to have had a relationship with Chema; but now he wants to show Casillas his loyalty and everything he is capable of doing for him. In another place, Rutila tells her grandmother that she feels very bad since she still has no news of Javier's whereabouts. Leandro tells his wife that he must travel to Mexico for a few days because he must find out who the person is trying to usurp. Upon reuniting with father, Ismael tells him that he has already found the whereabouts of the man who murdered Carmen and her children and that is why he wants to ask her to take him so that he can take revenge for what he did to her his family.
| 444 | 7 | "Casillas contra El Cabo" | 16 May 2018 | 1.70 |
Realizing that some strange men came to her community, the teacher decides to find out what happens and these men tell her they are looking for a man who had an accident. On the other hand, El Cabo asks his employees to take charge of offering the merchandise in one of the busiest parks in the city. Casillas visits Corina to tell her that she thought about the proposal she made to her and in exchange for working and trusting her she needs him to hand over the DEA chief himself. After his arrival in Mexico, Ámbar goes and meets with the ambassador and tells him that she was sent by the presidency as the new military attaché in that country.
| 445 | 8 | "Corina prueba su lealtad" | 17 May 2018 | 1.73 |
After learning that his father wants them far from his life, Rutila and Ismael tell him that they are not willing to turn away from him. Meanwhile, the guerrilla group arrives at the teacher's house to demand that she and the doctor show the wounded man they have hidden. Leandro arrives at the house of El Cabo to tell him that everyone is saying that he is the new drug dealer who is handling everything in Mexico and for this he wants them to talk more thoroughly about the matter. Omar asks Jaime to take charge of making a report of the candidate who is very likely to replace him and Ámbar tells the Minister that she is aware of the businesses below the rope that she is doing.
| 446 | 9 | "Casillas secuestra a Castillo" | 18 May 2018 | 1.60 |
Skinny manages to intercept the car of the president's security chief to deliver a message from Aurelio Casillas. Elsewhere, Javier returns to Milena's house and tells him that he feels very upset since he had to kill a person. Alba tells her grandchildren that she is thinking of the idea of going with the children to a safer place. Upon arriving at the house of Mayra, Castillo is surprised by Casillas and his men. Zuleta communicates with El Cabo to tell him that he discovered a way to pressure the President so that he finally agrees to meet with him. Leandro tells his wife that he still can not return to Colombia because he still needs to fix things in Mexico.
| 447 | 10 | "Todos en contra de Casillas" | 21 May 2018 | 1.57 |
Rutila tells her father that she had an argument with Omar again but this time she left her worried because she claimed her rights as the only relative of Isidro. Elsewhere, the guerrilla commander visits the house of Milena and Kashi to offer an apology for treating them badly. After talking with Aurelio, Castillo tells his colleagues that he spoke to him again about the business he has with the president but is unable to denounce him before a court and Colón takes advantage of that moment to demand from Corina more information about Casillas. After being threatened by one of the most feared narcos in Colombia; El Cabo meets with the President as he needs your help to carry out his plan against Casillas.
| 448 | 11 | "Casillas tiene nueva conquista" | 22 May 2018 | 1.65 |
When she to meet Ámbar, she gives Aurelio some gold ingots, but in return she wants to ask her to help her bring more of these since the government is willing to recover everything. After his meeting with the President, El Cabo tells his partner that he is willing to do anything to keep the place that Casillas is occupying. In another place, Leandro gives a very special surprise to his wife after his return to Colombia; but also this orders his men to take charge of finding out the lives of two subjects. After being helped by the teacher, Javier begins to feel attracted to her. Seeing the Colonel Maldonado, Rutila doubts the intentions of this woman and Aurelio tells Corina that her friend invited him to take a trip.
| 449 | 12 | "Quezada destrona al Cabo" | 23 May 2018 | 1.60 |
After having an intense encounter with Maldonado, Aurelio asks her to talk about the business they are going to carry out. Elsewhere, Zuleta shows El Cabo the video with which he could bribe the President and Omar tells his new companions that they should be very discreet with what happens in their meetings because if they do not they would be in big trouble. For his part, Javier begins to remember another woman and Milena tells her partner that if at any time he was curious to know what it feels like to be with a man. Colón meets alone with Corina to tell him that he is sure that she is falling in love with Casillas. Later, Leandro prepares his men to give a surprising blow and Rutila reaches the Colombian jungle to get news of Javier.
| 450 | 13 | "Casillas en el infierno turco" | 24 May 2018 | 1.74 |
With their arrival in Istanbul, Aurelio and Ámbar discover that the people in charge of the oil took all the gold bars; and because of this, Aurelio tells she his friend that between the two they will be in charge of recovering what was taken from them. Elsewhere, Rutila visits Doctor Milena's house to ask him about the wounded man he attended and El Cabo is disturbed to believe that one of his associates gave way to Quezada to end his men and his drug production in Colombia. On the other hand, Leandro orders his people to start assembling two coca laboratories as soon as possible and Corina shows Colón the man Rutila Casillas is now leaving, and who was also part of the Colombian Guerrilla.
| 451 | 14 | "Aurelio saca su lado oscuro" | 25 May 2018 | 1.36 |
After recovering the gold bars, Ámbar asks his partner what they are going to do now with all the money they have in their possession. Elsewhere, Omar tells the Interpol member that he knows that he does not care what is happening in his country and for this he wants to ask him to leave his office. When trying to communicate with Aurelio, Corina realizes that this may be in trouble and Milena tells his girlfriend that a woman came to his house to ask about Javier. Aurelio speaks with Corina to ask him for help with the people he has in Istanbul since he needs to move a merchandise as soon as possible and later Aurelio asks his daughter to help him get the location where Quezada is located.
| 452 | 15 | "Aurelio se molesta con Ámbar" | 28 May 2018 | 1.38 |
After his conversation with Ámbar, Aurelio communicates with Vitaminas to ask him to take care of sending people to Istanbul as soon as possible. On the other hand, El Cabo tells Zuleta that he still can not trust the president one hundred percent and for this he wants them to thoroughly check the plane in which he is going to be transported. Corina tells her superiors that she is working hard to obtain the location where Quezada can be found, since she very soon needs your help to set up an operation and capture it once and for all. Elsewhere, Rutila tries to get the most information about Leandro's whereabouts and Aurelio is in charge of talking to the man who will help them transport the gold bullion.
| 453 | 16 | "Ámbar sorprende a Casillas" | 29 May 2018 | 1.54 |
After talking to the woman who is looking for Javier, Cashi tells his girlfriend that he corroborates with his own eyes that this woman likes. Elsewhere, Rutila communicates with her grandmother to find out how everyone is and also wants to ask Ismael to recover soon as he urges him to be in Colombia as quickly as possible. La Ministra tells Arelis that she needs all her loyalty for the business she wants to carry out and after this, Greñas looks for Arelis because she needs to give him an answer of the proposal she made to him. Upon seeing the tunnel that Zuleta got him, El Cabo tells him that he is willing to give him a good commission but in return Omar should not know anything about this business.
| 454 | 17 | "Aurelio y Ámbar, tal para cual" | 30 May 2018 | 1.64 |
While traveling with Aurelio, Ámbar tells him that she has a nuclear detonator with him but she does not know what his fate will be since everything depends on the business between the vice president and his partners. Elsewhere, Omar tells Zuleta to work alongside Bernardo Castillo as his military strategist but he needs to promise that he will not have any kind of problem with him. On the other hand, Ismael tells his grandmother that he can not even think about having a serious relationship with the teacher since he is very afraid that the same thing happened with Carmen and her children; but just at that moment he receives a call from his sister since he wants to tell him that he finally found the plane where Javier was being transported.
| 455 | 18 | "Acorralan a Casillas" | 31 May 2018 | 1.57 |
After being attacked, Leandro communicates with El Cabo to find out if he was responsible for the DEA destroying one of his laboratories. In another place, Corina is in charge of pursuing the only man who is alive from the operation since he needs to know the real reasons why he shot his own boss. After finding the body of Quezada, Navarro tells Colon that he himself was in charge of questioning the man who was with him to know in fact who was the person who killed him since he can not yet trust the word of Corina. Later, Aurelio communicates with the members of the guerrilla to tell them to travel to Colombian lands and needs them to mount an operation for their arrival.
| 456 | 19 | "Aurelio amenaza a la guerrilla" | 1 June 2018 | 1.37 |
After listening to Rutila talk about the love story she had with Javier, Milena tells her girlfriend that she thinks it's best to tell her the whole truth. On the other hand Corina communicates with Aurelio to tell him that apparently they set a trap because the same one who shot Quezada was his man of trust and also the laboratory they found was very small for the amount of drug it produces. Skinny communicates with Ismael to tell him that the authorities almost caught them when they were transporting the goods and Greñas tries to explain to the officers why he is being transported in an armored truck with several men guarding him. Finally, Uzcátegui is in charge of interviewing one of the presidential candidates.
| 457 | 20 | "La DEA tras El Cabo" | 4 June 2018 | 1.52 |
After learning that his enemy may be alive, Aurelio looks for guerrilla members to demand an explanation about this rumor. On the other hand, Javier asks Cashi not to look for him anymore since he can not stop himself from wanting to be with her. El Cabo tells his men that they are going to be in charge of selling the drug through all the streets of Mexico, no matter that the authorities are making roadblocks everywhere. Navarro communicates with Castillo to tell him that the information that Corina had about Quezada was true and thanks to her they managed to kill this guy. Aurelio meets with one of the presidential candidates of the moment to talk about business since he needs to sell his merchandise without having any kind of inconvenience.
| 458 | 21 | "Aurelio llega a Cuba" | 5 June 2018 | 1.59 |
Colón tells Navarro that they managed to identify the subject of the photo and to their surprise he is one of the most important drug traffickers in Colombia. On the other hand, Mayra communicates with Castillo to tell him that in Los Pinos there is a very serious altercation and also wants to inform him of the complicity between Zuleta and the President. Elsewhere, Cashi asks his girlfriend if he thinks it's best to leave home. Leaving the meeting with the presidential candidate Aurelio asks one of the guerrilla members to contact Castro to tell him that they will be in Cuba as soon as possible. After investigating Navarro, Corina asks this guy if his behavior with her is due to the resemblance he has with his daughter.
| 459 | 22 | "Casillas provoca al diablo" | 6 June 2018 | 1.49 |
Arriving in Havana, Aurelio manages to get an appointment with Raul Castro and the other members of the revolution. In another place, Rutila communicates with her dad to tell her that for now she can not communicate with Corina since apparently she is on a mission. Javier looks for Milena to apologize for having sex with Cashi and also tells him to think things through and not leave Cashi for a mistake she made. Navarro confesses to Corina that if it is true that he reminds her of his daughter and that is why he is willing to put an end to drug trafficking, since his daughter died because of the delinquents.
| 460 | 23 | "El Cabo se enamora" | 7 June 2018 | 1.51 |
While he is with Maldonado, Aurelio receives a call from Casa Sola which tells him that he should go as soon as possible from Cuba since the members of the revolution are looking for him everywhere. Leandro gathers all its employees to thank them for the good work they have done; but he wants to warn them that it is forbidden to sell the merchandise to other people or else they will pay attention to the consequences. Javier asks the members of the guerrilla to let him go since his wife is very close to his superiors and Corina tells Colon that she feels very anxious since Aurelio's men are going to pick her up but she also wants to tell her why Navarro He hates it so much. While traveling through the streets of Mexico the Cape meets a servant of God called Evelina.
| 461 | 24 | "El Cabo al descubierto" | 8 June 2018 | 1.48 |
After meeting with Aurelio, Corina tells him that she managed to discover that the person who attacked them in Vera Cruz was the same Cabo; but also wants to tell you that this subject is in Mexico gathering a large army. On the other hand, Navarro tells Colón that he must travel to New York for a few days, since he must attend a very important meeting of Interpol. After the disastrous interview she had with the President, the Minister tells Arelis that she feels surprised that Omar occupies the most important position in the Nation. Later Jaime communicates with his friend to tell him to start his pre-campaign as Governor and Casa Sola tells his partner that he feels very worried because Ámbar was stopped by Valdez.
| 462 | 25 | "Rutila se entera que Javi vive" | 11 June 2018 | 1.57 |
Greñas takes advantage of the visit of Corina in Playa del Carmen to ask him to do everything possible to get rid of Navarro as this could at any time find the true location of his boss. Elsewhere Rutila is sought after by a renowned singer who proposes that he accompany him in a show he will give and when he meets Comandante Javier, Garañon asks him where he was hiding; Later Javier visits the teacher to tell him that he could not reach Rutila since the members of the guerrilla crossed his path and after listening to him Milena proposes a tempting proposal to his friend. El Cabo enters the father's house to talk about Evelina because since he met her he is hopelessly in love with her.
| 463 | 26 | "Rutila se reencuentra con Javi" | 12 June 2018 | 1.85 |
After a night of passion, Rutila discovers from her father that her allies in Colombia found the whereabouts of El Super Javi. In another place, Evelina discovers that her partner was found dead and in the middle of the wake, El Cabo appears to give the deepest condolences to her friend. Skinny communicates with Ismael to tell him that they are in serious trouble because the men of the Cape are following him and the rest of his companions, since apparently they set a trap to find the whereabouts of his father. Uzcátegui and his team investigate the strange death of a pastor and Maldonado meets with Commander Valdez who asks him for an explanation of where he has hidden the gold bullion that he stole with the help of Aurelio.
| 464 | 27 | "El Cabo roba terreno a Aurelio" | 13 June 2018 | 1.65 |
After meeting with Súper Javi Rutila can not contain his excitement to see it; But he tells her that he can not remember who she is and that is why he wants to forgive her because the last thing he wants is to hurt her. On the other hand, Maldonado communicates with Aurelio to tell him that Valdez learned that they stole some gold bullion and now he is demanding his share or else she will pay the consequences. After learning of a shooting that took place in Colonia, Castillo he told Colon that the attack was provoked by the Colombians, who were seeking control of this important area that belonged to Aurelio for decades. Finally, Corina manages to discover that the person who is protecting El Cabo is the President himself.
| 465 | 28 | "Rutila seduce a Súper Javi" | 14 June 2018 | 1.73 |
Dr. Milena arrives at the guerrilla camp to speak with Aurelio before returning to Mexico. After the intense discussion he had with his allies Colón asks Corina for results from Casillas as soon as possible. Castillo looks for the President to talk about the murder that occurred in the center of the city as he is sure that all this is due to the negligence of his own security secretary. El Cabo asks his men to take charge of the body of the pastor to bury him as soon as possible. Arriving at the coltan mines, Rutila takes desperate measures to make Javier try to remember her. While trying to get information about El Cabo, Ismael he learns that none of the narcos wants to do business with his father.
| 466 | 29 | "Casillas mueve su ficha" | 15 June 2018 | 1.42 |
After being attacked by a drug addict, Colon decides to abort the mission to take Corina to a hospital as soon as possible. On the other hand one of the soldiers of the guerrilla tells Casasola that Garañon attacked the people of the town and in addition to been taking in a very uncontrolled way. After spending the night with Rutila, Javier asks him to be patient so he can remember her and now he is more than sure that he will not be separated from her again. On the other hand El Cabo takes advantage of the death of the pastor to propose to Evelina that I continue with his life since he will help her get the church out and Aurelio sends for Uzcátegui since he needs to make a very important proposal.
| 467 | 30 | "El Cabo vs el presidente" | 18 June 2018 | 1.73 |
After his meeting with Uzcátegui, Aurelio asks him to be in charge of preparing appointments with each of the candidates for the Presidency since he wants to talk to them about very important hot springs about drug trafficking and in return he will have an exclusive interview. On the other hand, Garañon learns that in the town there are no more women at his disposal and therefore should be controlled a little more. When she realizes that one of her own men stole from her ranch, Diana decides to give him a warning because she is not willing to let anyone take away what her father and her have been struggling to achieve. After waking up Corina asks Colón what happened to him while they were in the operative; but just at that moment it receives an unknown call.
| 468 | 31 | "Casillas se burla del régimen" | 19 June 2018 | 1.74 |
Maldonado communicates with his partner to tell him that he is traveling with Valdez to Toluca but before landing he wants him to give him an answer as to how much he will give for each of his men that he killed. After this, Uscategui communicates with Aurelio to tell him that Begoña will travel to the ranch of Leonidas Ahumada to begin his candidacy. Elsewhere Diana asks Chepina because she is so distraught with the disappearance of her husband that she knows that he is a womanizer. Milena confesses to Cashi that in her past she was with a man but this caused her a lot of damage and because of this she could not feel the same curiosity of having sex with Javi. After the call of Maldonado, Aurelio decides to visit Valdez.
| 469 | 32 | "Javi y Rutila salvan a Kashi" | 20 June 2018 | 1.60 |
After the visit he made to Valdez, Aurelio asks Vitaminas if he could keep all the gold he got in a safe place; But Ismael uses the moment to ask his dad to use that money to reinforce each other's security. When meeting with Maldonado, the ambassador tells her that she has a very good proposal to make. With the view of Valdez to Mexican lands the Emabajadora tells him that he must comply with the assigned protocol since he can not enter his office that way. The doctor looks for Casa alone to tell her that her partner has been constantly intimidating her and can not take the situation that this makes her and the women of the community live.
| 470 | 33 | "Aurelio evalúa presidenciables" | 21 June 2018 | 1.67 |
After the autopsy performed on her worker, Diana tries to explain to Castillo that she was not aware of the illicit business he was doing. Elsewhere the President asks Zuleta not to leave him alone since it is his fault that something could happen to him for having forced him to do business with El Cabo. Later Valdez decided to accept the invitation made by the ambassador as well as Castillo, Colón and Corina. El Cabo tells Evelina that she is thinking of buying the house that belonged to the Pastor; but also wants to show him all the temples that he had in his name which makes him think that he was engaged in doing illicit business. Finally Aurelio decides to visit to Begoña before she leaves Coahuila.
| 471 | 34 | "Casillas va por la droga legal" | 22 June 2018 | 1.40 |
Uzcátegui tells the members of his team that he will attend the event organized by the Mexican embassy since he wants to be aware of what may happen in this place. Castillo tells the President that the situation in Coahuila and in several areas of northern Mexico are uncontrollable. Diana tells some of her men that she has thought about how to end trafficking once and for all and Leonidas gathers her family to tell them that she made the decision not to support Begoña for her candidacy. Rutila confesses to Melina that the attack that Javier suffered was his fault as the enemies of his family went after her and her brothers. Maldonado takes advantage of the event to approach Corina and ask her if she is the agent that is sleeping with Aurelio.
| 472 | 35 | "Ámbar debe entregarse a la DEA" | 25 June 2018 | 1.68 |
After sending a drone to the embassy event, Ismael realizes that many of the most important people are gathered at this site; but just then Luciana looks for him to try to seduce him. On the other hand Javier asks Cashi and Milena to think about leaving with them since Garañón is a bad person and could do them a lot of damage. Valdez takes advantage of the event to tell Maldonado that what he did to Aurelio is not going to stay that way and for this he will personally take charge of paying for this. Meanwhile, Colón asks Corina what was talking to Maldonado and Navarro communicates with his partner to tell him that he was able to get some benefits that would help them end Aurelio once and for all.
| 473 | 36 | "Rutila enfurece con Súper Javi" | 26 June 2018 | 1.65 |
Upon returning to see Maldonado, Aurelio asks her to surrender to the DEA. Elsewhere, Colon tells Corina that the event they attended was important as he was able to confirm the big differences between Uscategui and Omar. When you get to Playa del Carmen, Rutila shows Javier where they are going to stay and also takes the time to call his grandmother and ask her to go live with her for a couple of days. Castillo looks for the President to tell him that Navarro managed to get the approval of the United States to capture Casillas. Finally, Valdez meets with the Minister to thank him for the event he held but also wants to know where Maldonado is.
| 474 | 37 | "Aurelio rapta a otro candidato" | 27 June 2018 | 1.69 |
After the alert call received by Corina, Aurelio searches for Greñas to ask him for the information he asked about Navarro. When meeting Rutila, Jaime takes advantage of the moment to make a proposal and Corina asks Navarro directly if his visit to the main office was to request his dismissal. Isturiz communicates with Maldonado to tell him that things in Venezuela are going from bad to worse and upon hearing about this, Ámbar asks him to travel to Mexico as soon as possible. Upon hearing the agenda that Maira prepared for him, Omar asked him to find a way to change his schedule, since he urgently needed to meet other women. Finally, Aurelio mounted an operation to meet with one of the presidential candidates.
| 475 | 38 | "Casillas ordena a sus mujeres" | 28 June 2018 | 1.62 |
When she realizes that she is being persecuted by some men from the DEA Corina communicates with Navarro to tell her that she made a terrible mistake. In the middle of his conversation with the presidential candidate Aurelio receives an alert of the arrival of Castillo with members of the Navy. Evelina and El Cabo meet with their ex-partner's accountant to show him the financial statements that he managed and Jaime communicates with Omar to ask him not to do the event he has prepared since this would be counterproductive for the candidacy to which He is aspiring. Upon learning of what happened to Corina, Aurelio asks him to stay to live by his side and forget to return to his job as this would bring great problems for the death of the two agents.
| 476 | 39 | "Ámbar vs. Corina, como leonas" | 29 June 2018 | 1.44 |
Zuleta tells Rosales that only he will accompany him to an important mission that he must carry out. On the other hand, Ismael tells Aurelio that he managed to find a way to pass gasoline across the border; But he also wants to tell him that he feels very worried about the security that his sister needs. After making the passes with Javi, Rutila tells him that they are going to commission themselves to produce the merchandise and export it to the different destinations that they have foreseen since he does not want to have any problem with the posters that are in the area. Upon learning of the problems between Garañon and the people of the Guajira, Valdez is responsible for solving the problem on his own and Diana decides to go with the same Cabo.
| 477 | 40 | "El Cabo en guerra con Diana" | 2 July 2018 | 1.59 |
In the middle of a meeting with El Cabo, Diana tells him that the drug shipment that she did previously is going to be the last since she was only in that business for helping her husband. On the other hand, Javier asks his wife how he was with the meeting he had with the candidate for governor; but she asks you to talk about business since you need help to find a warehouse to start producing the merchandise. Elsewhere Casasola tells Garañón that the people of La Guajira are very upset with him because he does not respect the women of the community. Finally, Castillo looks for Uzcátegui to ask her if she was the person who passed information to Casillas of where Lopez Obrador was.
| 478 | 41 | "Diana desafía a El Cabo" | 3 July 2018 | 1.50 |
After the conversation he had with Diana, El Cabo asks his partner to send some men to chase her because he still can not trust her. In another place Javier tells Rutila that he feels very frustrated since he can not remember things well and all the information he had on his computer was lost. After Cashi and Milena revealed themselves against him, Garañon arrives at his house to give them a warning. Elsewhere, the Ambassador communicates with Maldonado to tell her that the President's son will be visiting the city, so now they must prepare a welcome and organize a protocol to guard him. Finally, Ismael looks for Arelis to propose a juicy business in exchange for her working for her family.
| 479 | 42 | "El Cabo en la mira" | 4 July 2018 | 1.21 |
Javier tells his wife that he is thinking about doing the therapies that he proposed; but he feels distressed with what he can remember. On the other hand, Milena tells his wife that he did not have to sleep with Garañón since he fell asleep and Paulina asks her friend to accept the deal that Ismael proposed since it is best not to have any kind of problem with the Casillas. Omar communicates with Jaime to tell him that he is preparing everything to celebrate his departure party and Zuleta tells his boss that the order he requested could be fully completed. On the other hand, Corina looks for Ismael to confess that he can not trust Maldonado since at any moment he can reveal his true identity.
| 480 | 43 | "Ámbar negocia con la DEA" | 5 July 2018 | 1.63 |
Realizing that his employer wants to confront El Cabo, her man of confidence tries to make her realize that this individual is very dangerous and for this reason believes that it is best to avoid a tragedy. After listening to Arelis, the ambassador asks her to accept the apartment that Casillas gives her and also wants to ask her to arrange an appointment with this subject. On the other hand Ismael is given the task of looking for a Presidential candidate and upon returning to the offices of the DEA, Corina tells his superiors that he can identify the place where Aurelio is; but right at that moment Maldonado meets with the agents to propose an important deal.
| 481 | 44 | "El Cabo se desquita con Diana" | 6 July 2018 | 1.52 |
After Maldonado shows up at the offices of the DEA Corina tells her bosses that she is sure that this woman has a lot of information because she believes that she does illicit business and also this could confirm all the work she is in charge of doing to find some of the most important capos. When seeing Omar in the house of Jaime, Rutila says to him that she is not arranged to speak with this subject since he makes part of his dark past. In the middle of an event that her father is offering, Diana realizes that El Cabo and his men arrived at this same place. Elsewhere, Casasola confronts Garañón after learning that he has the doctor and the professor in his possession.
| 482 | 45 | "Van por Casillas y Águila Azul" | 9 July 2018 | 1.70 |
In the midst of a conversation with Corina, Colón receives a warning message from the CIA; after the disappearance of Águila Azul; but upon learning of the situation, Corina asks her boss if she thinks this is true since it could be a plan to mislead them to fulfill their true objective. In another place, Uzcátegui sets a trap for Castillo so that he agrees to speak with Aurelio. When they meet with their men El Cabo tells them that they are going to prepare because in a few days they will know the place where Casillas is hiding and Zuleta finds out that there is a spoken portrait of the person who killed Ortega's relative. On the other hand, Diana tells her sister that she is very tense since the Ramos brothers are threatening them.
| 483 | 46 | "El Rojo se une a los Casillas" | 10 July 2018 | 1.63 |
Corina looks for El Rojo, after his release and takes him to the Casillas. They offer you, work for them. Ismael kidnaps El Mocho and Evelina. Nora Requena arrives to extradite Aurelio.
| 484 | 47 | "Evelina atrae a Casillas" | 11 July 2018 | 1.70 |
The location of the Casillas is blown to El Cabo and now, more than ever, it is for him and his family; and also, to rescue Evelina. The CIA suffers a loss.
| 485 | 48 | "El Cabo listo para su revancha" | 12 July 2018 | 1.83 |
At the command of an army, El Cabo prepares his ambush to close the pending account he has with Casillas, at dawn. El Greñas uncovers Evelina's dark past as a servant sex.
| 486 | 49 | "Diana confiesa que es narco" | 13 July 2018 | 1.55 |
Because she is in danger, Diana reveals to her mother that the real business of the family is to transport drugs to the United States. Casillas orders to investigate Zuleta. Maldonado manipulates Navarro.
| 487 | 50 | "Casillas contra el presidente" | 16 July 2018 | 1.74 |
Aurelio maintains that the best defense is the attack, so he turns instructions to get the Los Pinos plans. The sabotage at the presidential reception highlights Terán.
| 488 | 51 | "Casillas mata a Zuleta" | 17 July 2018 | 1.73 |
Like a sniper, Casillas kills Zuleta with a plummet and warns the president that the one who plays with fire burns. Ismael tortures El Mocho and Rutila prevents him from continuing to do so.
| 489 | 52 | "Duelo entre Casillas y El Cabo" | 18 July 2018 | 1.98 |
After the bazooka against the Casillas and the shooting unleashed among the cartels, El Cabo swears to make Aurelio pay, in the same currency: liquidate his family. Evelina and El Mocho flee.
| 490 | 53 | "El Cabo balea a Casillas" | 19 July 2018 | 1.82 |
When Aurelio believes that he killed his enemy, the Corporal surprises him and shoots him in the head, leaving him badly wounded. Aurelio asks for help from an old friend. Alba and company arrive at Rancho Ahumada.
| 491 | 54 | "Casillas lucha por su vida" | 20 July 2018 | 1.64 |
Heavily injured, Casillas seeks refuge with El Rayo, an old childhood friend who tries to keep him alive. El Cabo thinks about Aurelio to finish him off. Rutila, is jealous with Kashi.
| 492 | 55 | "Águila Azul revela su rostro" | 23 July 2018 | 1.76 |
As he had announced, Amado Leal, alias Águila Azul, kills Gonzalez, another former agent, and discovers that Colón is an ally of his enemies. Casillas is in a coma and El Rayo could deliver him.
| 493 | 56 | "Intensa búsqueda tras Casillas" | 24 July 2018 | 1.71 |
While the president and El Cabo want Casillas dead, the DEA seeks him alive to make him pay for all his crimes, extraditing him to the United States. Águila Azul goes for Colón and the agent knows it.
| 494 | 57 | "Van al refugio de Casillas" | 25 July 2018 | 1.88 |
Corina discovers that they attribute to Águila Azul, being the head of a criminal organization; but it is false. They meet again and together they look for Casillas. The DEA fails. Garañón and El Cabo are allies.
| 495 | 58 | "Aurelio y Amado son hermanos" | 26 July 2018 | 1.81 |
Águila Azul admits that he and Aurelio are brothers. Corina, hearing it, claims to him, why, after so many years, he had never told her. El Cabo reviews the list of boxing gyms in Tepito.
| 496 | 59 | "El Cabo enfrenta a Águila Azul" | 27 July 2018 | 1.76 |
Milton Jimenez arrives with his men and destroys Casillas' hideout at the point of lead and fire, but ends up facing Águila Azul. Aurelio gets worse; his wound bleeds and is infected.
| 497 | 60 | "Secuestran a Diana Ahumada" | 30 July 2018 | 1.93 |
While Diana confesses to her sister that she never went to Spain, several men take her guards by surprise and take her away at gunpoint. Berenice informs Ismael.
| 498 | 61 | "Evelina sospecha de El Cabo" | 31 July 2018 | 1.85 |
Evelina suspects that Milton Jiménez had to do with the attack on the gym in Tepito and warns him that he could have killed Rayo, his father, who disappeared. Aurelio is taken to Rancho Ahumada.
| 499 | 62 | "Misión para salvar a Casillas" | 1 August 2018 | 1.97 |
To hide their identity, Amado and Ismael decide to move Casillas, bandaged as if he were burned, so that he immediately receives specialized medical attention. Alba rejects Águila Azul.
| 500 | 63 | "Diana golpea al secuestrador" | 2 August 2018 | 1.84 |
Defiant and badly intoned, Diana defends herself and prevents one of the Ramos brothers from raping her. Meanwhile, Águila Azul prepares an operation for Diana's rescue. Aurelio goes by ambulance to the hospital.
| 501 | 64 | "Águila Azul rescata a Diana" | 3 August 2018 | 1.73 |
A surprise attack on the ranch of the Ramos brothers, in charge of Águila Azul, ends with the life of the kidnappers and Diana in freedom, safe and sound. Aurelio undergoes surgery.
| 502 | 65 | "A Diana le atrae Águila Azul" | 6 August 2018 | 1.94 |
Grateful for saving her life, Diana confesses to Águila Azul that she was in love with Aurelio, when she was little and now Amado is "on the right track".
| 503 | 66 | "El Cabo tirotea a El Chivo" | 7 August 2018 | 1.88 |
When Diana's father announces the withdrawal of his candidacy, El Cabo and his men shoot to kill him. An ambulance takes him to the nearest hospital. Alba ends with El Mocho in a single blow.
| 504 | 67 | "Atrapan a Javi" | 8 August 2018 | 1.83 |
On board a plane loaded with drugs, Javi disobeys the order to land; He tries to hide, but ends up arrested. He manages to inform Rutila. El Chivo dies.
| 505 | 68 | "Amado Casillas vs El Cabo" | 9 August 2018 | 1.74 |
Rutila gathers all his men and introduces Amado, as part of the Casillas family. In command of the operation, she orders the first objective: to kill El Cabo. Berenice always liked Ismael.
| 506 | 69 | "Diana y El Cabo odio a muerte" | 10 August 2018 | 1.63 |
After killing Garañón with bullets, Diana receives a call from El Cabo and they swear, one to the other, to end their life. Jaime tries to free Javi, but the DEA prevents him.
| 507 | 70 | "Terán acusa a Casillas" | 13 August 2018 | 1.81 |
Terán uses the media to victimize, defame his former Secretary of Security and blame Aurelio Casillas for the death of Chivo. Diana lies to the press about her connection with the Casillas.
| 508 | 71 | "Amado y Diana se besan" | 14 August 2018 | 1.69 |
Amado Leal is reluctant to form a relationship, being a fugitive, but ends up confessing to Diana Ahumada that he dies to be with her. Alba and the Casillas must leave Rancho Ahumada.
| 509 | 72 | "Amado libera a Javi y al Rojo" | 15 August 2018 | 1.72 |
After an attack on the president, to distract the authorities, Amado poses as Aurelio and in an operative command, confronts the DEA and frees Javi and El Rojo. Diana must surrender.
| 510 | 73 | "Sospechan de Ámbar" | 16 August 2018 | 1.85 |
Ismael Casillas promises a good reward to the Ambassador of Venezuela, if he confirms that Ambar Maldonado gave the whistle to the DEA, to arrest Javi. Amado goes after the seized merchandise.
| 511 | 74 | "Diana y Amado hacen el amor" | 17 August 2018 | 1.53 |
After making love for the first time, Amado promises Diana that they will escape together; but first, he must go to Tijuana to install the Casillas. Ismael receives Laura mistreated and wounded.
| 512 | 75 | "Amenazan con arrestar a Diana" | 20 August 2018 | 1.77 |
When Esther becomes Governor, she swears she will arrest her own daughter. To avoid it, she asks that Diana surrender beforehand. Amado will do everything possible so that the seriousness of Aurelio is not known.
| 513 | 76 | "Diana abre su botín millonario" | 21 August 2018 | 1.68 |
Diana shows Amado Leal the millions of dollars she hides, a product of drug trafficking. She asks him to manage her resources. The Casillas have El Cabo in sight: he arrives in Quintana Roo.
| 514 | 77 | "Premio por Casillas y El Cabo" | 22 August 2018 | 1.66 |
The DEA distributes ten million dollars, for the capture of Aurelio Casillas and El Cabo; but Ishmael triples the number and guarantees loyalty to the Lord of the Skies. Esther will fight the narco.
| 515 | 78 | "Reaparece el hijo del Chema" | 23 August 2018 | 1.65 |
Leonardo reappears in Playa del Carmen and confesses that he fled Sinaloa, where he lived with El Chema Venegas, his father. Amado negotiates with Maldonado, in exchange for information.
| 516 | 79 | "Amado embosca al Cabo" | 24 August 2018 | 1.56 |
El Cabo and the Casillas face bullets. Ismael, submits to Milton Jiménez and points to the head. Maldonado, mocks security and challenges the Arab. Chema goes for his son, Leonardo.
| 517 | 80 | "El Rojo debe elegir" | 27 August 2018 | 1.76 |
After the appearance of Leonardo, the Casillas prepare to face El Chema and think of El Rojo, as one of their own. Rojo must decide which side you stay on, in this war.
| 518 | 81 | "El Chema va por su hijo" | 28 August 2018 | 1.82 |
Although his men recommend low profile, El Chema decides to go find Leonardo. El Rojo stays with the Casillas. José María Venegas learns that he is free.
| 519 | 82 | "Nuevo escondite para Aurelio" | 29 August 2018 | 1.59 |
The house in Tijuana offers the best conditions to hide Aurelio, for the tunnels he has. Amado orders Diana to speed up the move with the Casillas. Casasola is arrested.
| 520 | 83 | "El Chema somete a Corina" | 30 August 2018 | 1.63 |
To locate Casillas, El Chema submits Corina, for being an agent of the DEA; but she is reluctant to help him. Valdés and the Arab have the projectile ready for the terrorist attack on the United States.
| 521 | 84 | "Diana y Amado apasionados" | 3 September 2018 | 1.71 |
With the Casillas already installed in Tijuana, Diana and Amado enjoy an unprecedented night. Aurelio, still in a coma, could hear what others are saying.
| 522 | 85 | "Aurelio reacciona del coma" | 4 September 2018 | 1.65 |
While Amado prepares with all his men, to stop the terrorist attack on the United States, Aurelio moves unexpectedly, when he recognizes Corina's voice.
| 523 | 86 | "Amado con pistas del atentado" | 5 September 2018 | 1.69 |
The Arabs eliminate the spy from the Casillas, Amado deciphers the murderer's message, which gives him clues to the place of the terrorist attack and threatens him with death. Uzcátegui attacks Terán.
| 524 | 87 | "El Cabo condiciona a Terán" | 6 September 2018 | 1.72 |
After suffering a coup d'etat, former President Terán flees from Los Pinos and contacts the Corporal. He looks for him in his private plane and demands the free entry of his gunmen. Amado deduces the white of the Arabs.
| 525 | 88 | "Amado evita ataque terrorista" | 7 September 2018 | 1.51 |
The Casillas surprise the Arabs. They rescue Casasola and Maldonado and lock the ringleader and prevent a missile from impacting the US. El Chema takes over the narcotienditas in Mexico.
| 526 | 89 | "La Doña y Amado son aliados" | 10 September 2018 | 1.86 |
Alive by miracle and fleeing from Baltazar Ojeda, La Doña arrives in Mexico and joins Amado to confront him, putting the Casillas at risk. El Chema aims to unmask the double of Aurelio.
| 527 | 90 | "Diana muere de celos" | 11 September 2018 | 1.67 |
Amado decides to go out to an operative with La Doña and Diana; but she does not go, warning him that she is not his wife, do not be not wrong. Altagracia manipulates Águila Azul. Anaya commits another crime.
| 528 | 91 | "La Doña y Amado se besan" | 12 September 2018 | 1.69 |
In the middle of the operation to hunt down and kill the enemy they have in common, Altagracia seduces Amado. Diana calls her family, to warn them to redouble security.
| 529 | 92 | "El duelo de Amado y Ojeda" | 13 September 2018 | 1.68 |
After two ambushes, explosions and shootings, Amado faces Baltazar Ojeda as a murderer and corrupt. Milena kisses Rutila. The Casillas kidnap Anaya. Pulque is happy with Alba.
| 530 | 93 | "El Chema, enamorado de Rutila" | 14 September 2018 | 1.59 |
After so many years, El Chema is reunited with Rutila; he demands to see her two children and tries to seduce her. Diana awaits the attack of the Colombians and Amado decides to assist her in the operation.
| 531 | 94 | "Diana y Amado contraatacan" | 17 September 2018 | 1.76 |
By air and by land, Amado and Diana defend the Ahumada Ranch with weapons and grenades. Rutila tells Chema, that a pact that ends with El Cabo, should consult with the rest of the family.
| 532 | 95 | "La Doña pacta con los Casillas" | 18 September 2018 | 1.80 |
La Doña will wash the Casillas' fortune through her construction companies. Diana, reluctant, ends up accepting that she works for them. Carla denounces Terán and he sends El Capo to kill her.
| 533 | 96 | "Molestos con Rutila" | 19 September 2018 | 1.81 |
The idea of Chema to ally with the Casillas and kill El Cabo, forces Rutila to convince her family that it is only for that.
| 534 | 97 | "El Cabo fuera vivo o muerto" | 20 September 2018 | 1.78 |
To declare war on their common enemy: El Cabo, the Casillas agree with El Chema and Javi will be in charge. The prosecutor avoids being abducted along with Carla. Terán starts his escape. Jaime calls his father, President Rosales (who ascended to the presidency upon the coup d'état against Teran) for help.
| 535 | 98 | "Castillo arresta a Terán" | 21 September 2018 | 1.62 |
Castillo puts Terán behind bars and swears he will pay for all his crimes, especially, for Mayra, his girlfriend. El Cabo impregnates his women and both refuse to have the babies. President Rosales wants something in return from Teran to avoid prosecution in ensuring his son, Jaime becomes President in the next Presidential election.
| 536 | 99 | "Amado se entrega" | 24 September 2018 | 2.06 |
To protect the Casillas cartel, Amado turns himself in to justice, on condition that he be prosecuted in Mexico. Diana promises to get him out of prison. They love each other. El Cabo flees. Terán escapes and flees the country.
