= Aurelio Casillas =

- El Señor de los Cielos character
- Rafael Amaya as Aurelio Casillas
- Portrayed by: Rafael Amaya (2013–2026)
- Duration: 2013–2026
- First appearance: "Arranca la balacera" (2013)
- Created by: Luis Zelkowicz
- Spin-off appearances: El Chema (2016)
In-universe information
- Occupation: Leader of Juárez Cartel
- Mother: Zeferina Vianey Estrada
- Children: Alyssa Aimee Martinez-Estrada (daughter)

Aurelio Casillas is a fictional character and the protagonist on the Telemundo television series El Señor de los Cielos, created by Luis Zelkowicz, portrayed by Rafael Amaya. The character is based on Mexican drug trafficker Amado Carrillo Fuentes. Aurelio Casillas is one of the most sought-after drug traffickers in Mexico after getting tons of drugs to the United States through airplanes.

== Appearances ==
=== Original Series (2013–) ===
==== Season 1–2 ====
The season follows the life of Aurelio Casillas (Rafael Amaya), a drug lord who is recognized for knowing how to transfer drug substances to Mexico, Colombia, and the United States. Aurelio and his wife Ximena (Ximena Herrera) have three children, Rutila (Carmen Aub), Heriberto (Ruy Senderos), and Luz Marina (Gala Montes). He also has his faithful brother Chacorta (Raúl Méndez) who helps him in all his illicit businesses. Aurelio would end up being cornered by the authorities after being found as he decides to undergo a face operation in which he supposedly dies, thus causing his empire of power to fall.

Believed to be dead in season two, Aurelio returns to enact his revenge on police officer Leonor Ballesteros (Carmen Villalobos), who through her fault ends up operating his face in a failed attempt to escape from the authorities. Aurelio meets Victoria Navárez (Marlene Favela), a beautiful woman who throws herself to be the governor of Jalisco. Aurelio, after seeing her actions on television, falls in love and decides to deceive her by posing as another man and usurping the identity of Danilo Ferro. A character that is then introduced is José María Venegas, better known as El Chema (Mauricio Ochmann), one of the great enemies of Aurelio who decides to take all its power to Aurelio. At the end of the season with the help of Secretary of State of Mexico, Rivero Lanz; Rivero and Leonor used Victoria as bait to capture Aurelio, which resulted in the death of Victoria in the hands of Aurelio, but was eventually arrested and placed in a prison naval bunker.

==== Season 3–4 ====
In season three, after several months imprisoned in naval bunker in Mexico, Aurelio receives the mutilated head of his brother Chacorta in a box, implying that his brother has died, who gives him reason to wage a war against all his enemies and to look for the murderer of his brother, to avenge his death. After all the problems with the government and the DEA, Aurelio learns that he suffers from kidney failure and decides to remember his past in order to find his lost son.

In season four, Aurelio after being cornered by his illness and not finding no relative who lives with him can donate a kidney, decides to undertake a search for all the lovers he had in order to find a lost son who can donate a kidney. After several attempts of searching, Aurelio finds a young man named Ismael (Iván Arana), who can be his salvation. His enemies, after learning of his illness, decide to do everything possible to get Ismael out of the way. When everything seems to take its course and achieve total stability in the world of legal and illegal businesses of Aurelio, Emiliana Contreras (Vanessa Villela) appears a beautiful woman sent by Feyo Aguilera (Leonardo Daniel) to be able to make Aurelio fall, but her mission is to become the lover of Aurelio to thus be able to finally make the fall of Aurelio's empire.

==== Season 5–7 ====
In season five, Aurelio, will unleash a new war, but this time it will not be against his former rivals and enemies – this time, it will be against his own nephew, Victor Casillas Jr (son of Chacorta) because of the betrayals he had previously experienced on their part. Later, Aurelio (Rafael Amaya), will also face a serious illness, which puts at stake his power and prestige since this man fails to get a donor, so they can make his transplant, necessary to continue living. On the other hand, Mónica (Fernanda Castillo) fights for her life after being rescued from Víctor's hands in the middle of their wedding, since while she fled received a shot that apparently is mortal; After being taken from his side, Víctor (Jorge Luis Moreno) searches everywhere to find Mónica's whereabouts and continue with her wedding plans.

In season six, Aurelio Casillas recovered all the lost fortune and finally feels the need to retire. But it is time for retribution, the hatred that he sowed since he sold his soul to the drug trafficking demon is now knocking on his door with the face and blood of the many innocent people he destroyed. Aurelio will understand that his riches are an illusion, and that after being the great hunter he was, he will now become the prey. The women he mistreated, the men he betrayed, the political puppets he put in power, and even his own children will turn against him. As a result, he was shot in the head by El Cabo, which left him in a coma for several months.

In season seven, under the supervision of Doña Alba (Lisa Owen) and a specialized doctor, they try a risky procedure to revive Aurelio (Rafael Amaya), which ultimately led to his death.

=== Spin-off ===
==== El Chema (2016) ====
Aurelio briefly appears in a meeting with Ramiro Silvo de la Garza (Juan Ignacio Aranda), in which he's informed that his pawn, the President of Mexico, Omar Terán (Jesús Moré), has made every attempt to achieve the extradition of El Chema to the United States; in order to keep El Chema far from Aurelio's daughter, Rutila, who he has his eyes on.

Poster of the series comic, representing Aurelio Casillas.

=== Comic book series ===
During the second season of the series, Telemundo created a comic based on the second season, which shows what happened with Aurelio after his operation where he supposedly died and his revenge against El Turco. This comic only had two editions where it showed the whole plot of season two.

==== Plot ====
After Aurelio returns from death, he begins to search for El Turco to take back everything he stole while El Chema continues to grow his empire and become Mexico's most powerful drug dealer after Aurelio's absence. Aurelio after killing El Turco, begins to maintain a low profile and continue to play dead in order to regain his empire, but this will be impossible because of Leonor Ballestero, a police officer who has been pursuing him for a long time because she believes he is not dead. In order to continue hiding from the authorities Aurelio Casillas decides to create a plan and to supplant the identity of Danilo Ferro a recognized Mexican businessman, whom he kidnaps and threatens to assassinate. Aurelio when obtaining its new identity begins to seduce Victoria Návarez, a postulant to the government of Mexico, thanks to her he obtains more power and continues to run his empire thanks to his new identity. He died from the injuries to head, shot by El Cabo.

=== Television ===
The character has appeared in multiple television series, in Señora Acero, he appeared in three episodes, two of the first season and one in the second season. Aurelio also appears in the English adaptation of La Reina del Sur, entitled Queen of the South. Later appeared in the sequel of the series El Señor de los Cielos, titled El Chema, the character appears in few episodes of the series.
