= El Señor de los Cielos season 5 =

El Señor de los Cielos
- Season 5
- El Señor de los Cielos season 5 poster
- Starring: Rafael Amaya; Fernanda Castillo; Carmen Aub; Sabrina Seara; Vanessa Villela; Maricela González; Mariana Seoane; Miguel Varoni
- No. of episodes: 95

Release
- Original network: Telemundo
- Original release: June 20 – November 2, 2017

Season chronology
- Next → Season 6

The fifth season of the drama television series El Señor de los Cielos premiered on Telemundo on June 20, 2017, and concluded on November 2, 2017. The season follows the revenge of Aurelio against his nephew Víctor Casillas and his enemy La Felina.

It stars Rafael Amaya as Aurelio Casillas — A Mexican drug lord, along with Fernanda Castillo, Carmen Aub, Vanessa Villela, Sabrina Seara, and incorporation into the lead role of Maricela González, and Mariana Seoane and Miguel Varoni both including as special participation.

The fifth season of the series was made available on Blim on September 22, 2017.

== Plot ==
Aurelio Casillas (Rafael Amaya) has retreated from action and business to live his relationship with Emiliana Contreras (Vanessa Villela), his last lover, at a ranch near the mountain known as the Golden Triangle between the states of Sonora, Sinaloa and Durango, apparently enjoying their condition of "dead" for the authorities. However, within his soul and in his cold brain, he prepares because he knows that soon the war that is pending with Víctor (Jorge Luis Moreno), his nephew, will begin soon, and one of the two will not come alive. It will be a war to the death that will shed a great deal of blood and not of other people, but of his own family.

Mónica (Fernanda Castillo) was seriously injured from the day of her wedding and it's been a while since she awoke from the coma that kept her on the verge of death. While Doña Alba (Lisa Owen), she is in danger when attackers destroy the convent where she was long confined and uses her son to save her skin and the nuns who are at risk of rape and death. Víctor, oblivious to everything that has happened to Mónica and the rest of his family, lives crazy for not finding his wife. Rage and bitterness have taken possession of him and he has Mexico plunged into horror and chaos. Los Maras Salvatruchas and other emerging organizations at their command, all ruthless and cruel, have been engaged in dealing with drugs, kidnappings, piracy and trafficking in persons, leading the government to declare itself in emergency. His loyal collaborator, Superjavi (Alejandro López) has decided to withdraw to Colombia and operate from there because he knows that he will not reach a good end if he stays next to Víctor, and seeks the alliance with Aurelio.

Ismael (Iván Arana), meanwhile, has occupied the position of family counselor Casillas and will do everything possible to try to have his family united and above all, to achieve a truce between his father and his cousin. La Felina (Maricela González), who had been detained, warns Emiliana, her ally, that she will be extradited and rescued to make her a part of her cartel, all behind Aurelio. Once in the street, La Felina organizes a group of Colombians to support Emiliana. Mónica, once recovered, joins the business again, setting up her own group, ready to end all past joining with the Casillas to be released from that trap of their own heart. Nevertheless, Aurelio discovers the great lie of Emiliana and Lourdes (Ofelia Medina) and must give the reason to Mónica, who always confronted them, and to look for an alliance with her that will begin by the strategies of its politics of war, but in a very little time will try to take it to their bed, as they both wish, but out of pride they deny.

They will be Aurelio and his new allies, the posters of the old guard, in union with the Colombians, who paradoxically, will save the country from its total destruction, before the impassive look of the authorities. Once peace is attained, with the pain of her own shed blood, she will seek to close with Mónica the story they have unfinished, not knowing if this is possible after so much pain and so much death.

== Cast ==
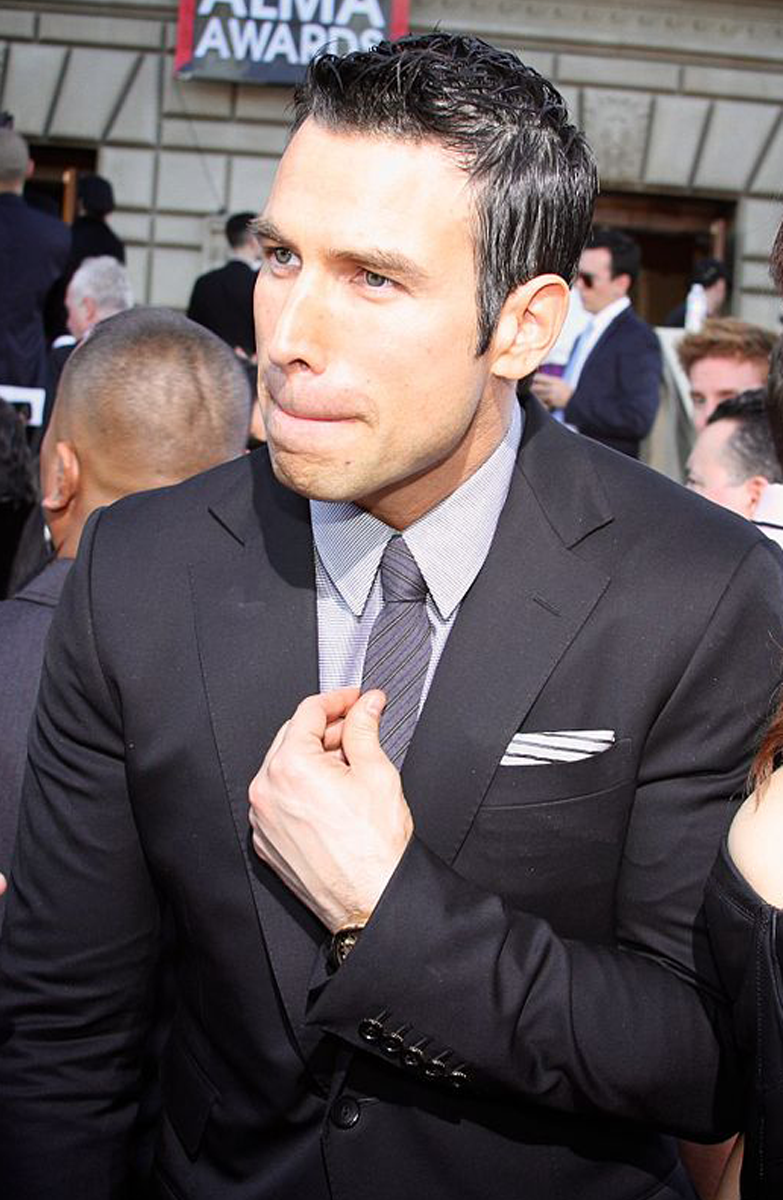
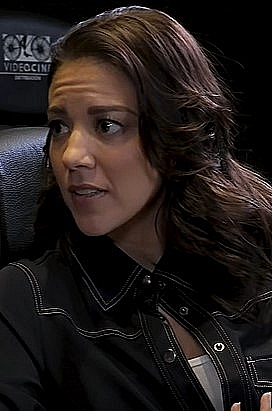
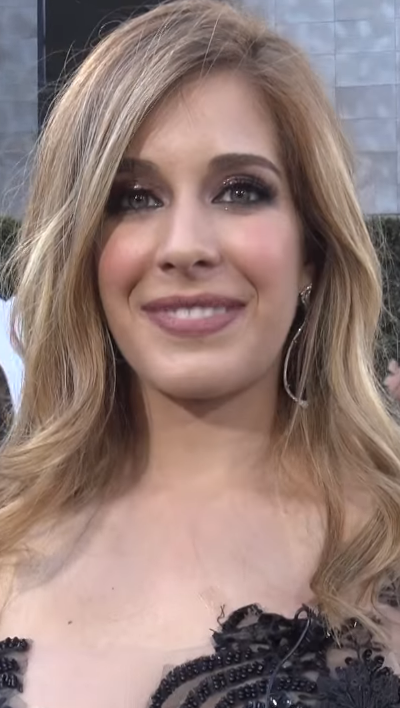
Rafael Amaya, Fernanda Castillo, and Carmen Aub (left to right) portray Aurelio Casillas, Mónica Robles, Rutila Casillas, respectively.
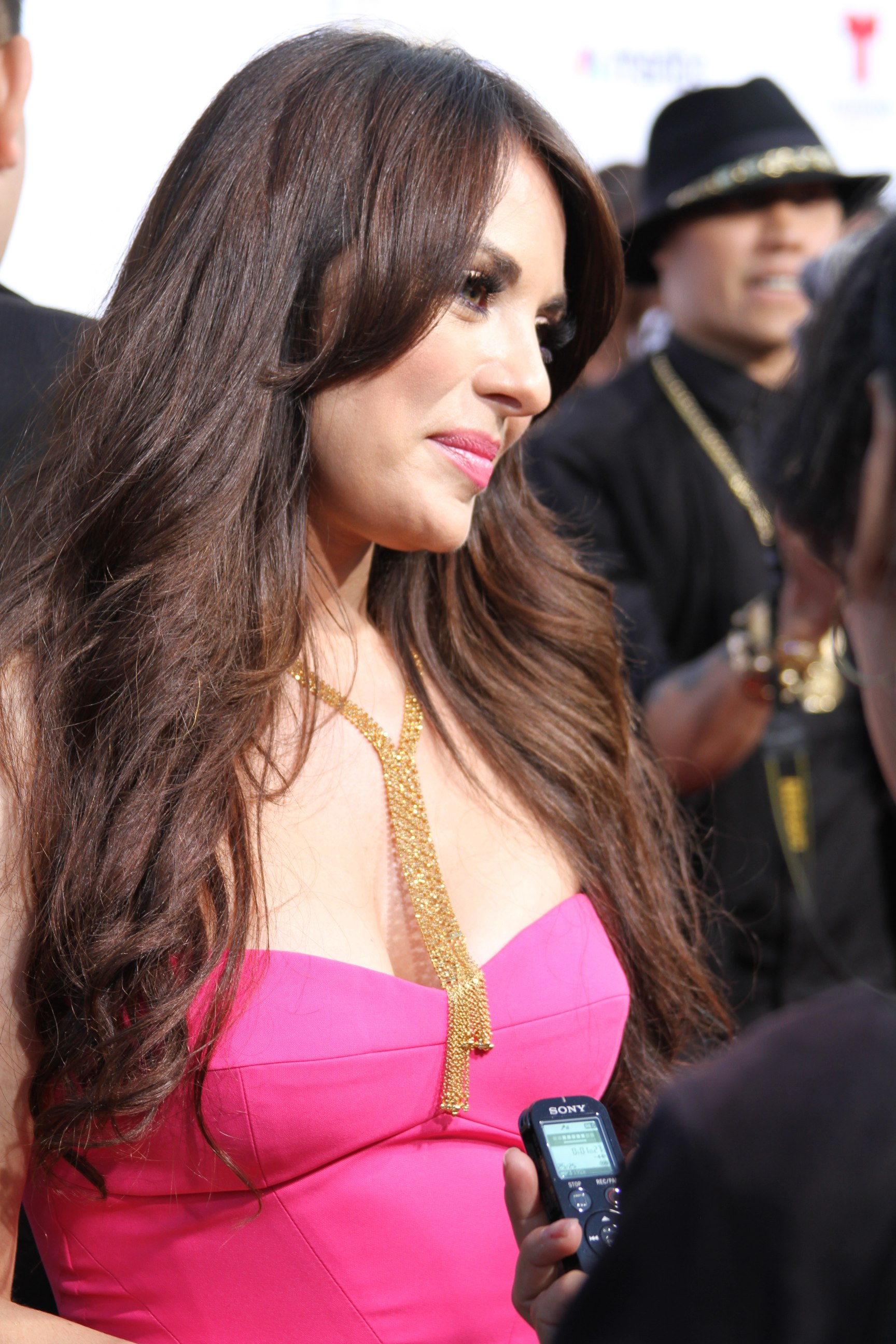
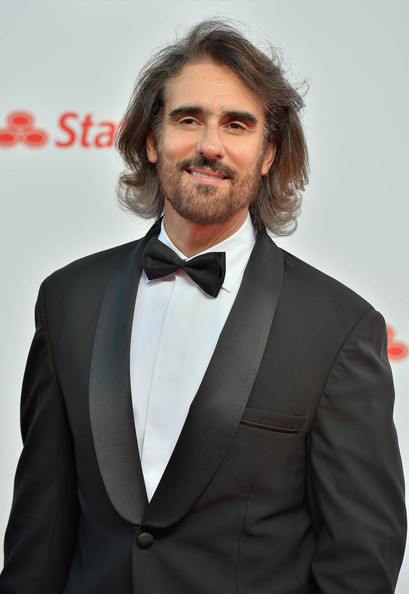
Vanessa Villela and Miguel Varoni (left to right) portray Emiliana Contreras and Leandro Quezada, respectively.

=== Main ===
- Rafael Amaya as Aurelio Casillas
- Fernanda Castillo as Mónica Robles
- Carmen Aub as Rutila Casillas
- Sabrina Seara as Esperanza Salvatierra
- Vanessa Villela as Emiliana Contreras
- Maricela González as Eunice “La Felina” Lara
- Mariana Seoane as Mabel Castaño / Ninón del Valle
- Miguel Varoni as Leandro Quezada

=== Recurring ===
- Plutarco Haza as Dalvio “El Ingeniero” Navarrete
- Wendy de los Cobos as Aguasanta "Tata" Guerra
- Lisa Owen as Alba Casillas
- Patricia Vico as Pilar Ortiz
- Jorge Luis Moreno as Víctor Casillas Jr.
- Iván Arana as Ismael Casillas
- Manuel Balbi as Rodrigo Rivero Lanz
- Jesús Moré as Omar Terán
- Carlos Mata as Juan Carlos Salvatierra
- Lorena del Castillo as Oficial Evelyn García
- Juan Martín Jauregui as Sebastián Almagro
- Ofelia Medina as Lourdes Contreras
- Ernesto Benjumea as Melquiades Soler / Penumbra
- Ricardo Leguizamo as Rafael Jiménez / Doble 30
- Catherina Cardozo as Giuseppina "Pina" Cortini
- José Juan Meraz as David Ponce
- Alex Walerstein as El Greñas
- Alan Slim as Jaime Ernesto Rosales
- Alejandro Félix as Chatarrero
- Francisco Calvillo as Rubén Saba
- Carlos Puente as Pompeyo
- Daniela Zavala as Arelis Mendoza
- José Sedek as Bernardo Castillo
- Polo Monarrez as Filemón
- Paloma Jiménez as Paloma Villareal
- Iván Tamayo as Jorge Elías Salazar
- Alejandro López as El Súper Javi
- Emmanuel Esparza as Tony Pastrana
- Rafael Novoa as Raymundo Cabrera / El Duro
- Leonardo Álvarez as Leonardo Castaño / El Chema II
- Elsy Reyes as Carla Uzcátegui
- Carlos Gallardo as Carlos Zuleta

=== Special guest stars ===
- Roberto Tapia as himself
- Juan Manuel Mendoza as Andrés Velandia
- Karla Carrillo as Corina Saldaña
- Daniel Rascón as El Toro
- Robinson Díaz as Miltón Jiménez / El Cabo

== Production ==
During a radio interview with Javier Poza, Fernanda Castillo confirmed that the series would have a fifth season. In a press renewal series release for the 2017-2018 television season, NBCUniversal Telemundo Enterprises announced that the series would be renewed for a fifth and sixth season. On May 8, 2017, it was confirmed that the production for the fifth season had begun in Mexico City. On May 25, 2017, Telemundo confirmed the main plot of the season in an advance that went on the air. On June 8, 2017, Telemundo published an exclusive preview of the series through its website.

=== Casting ===
The new season has the previous cast of the previous seasons, also introduced new characters as Mariana Seoane as Mabel Castaño, character that appeared previously in the series El Chema. It also has the integration of actors Rafael Novoa and Emmanuel Esparza. As do the Venezuelan actors, Carlos Mata as Juan Carlos Salvatierra and Catherina Cardozo as Giuseppina.

== Reception ==
In its premiere the average series a total of 2.27 million spectators, surpassing thus to La Piloto, series of Univision and with that towards competition in its final chapters. After that the series became the most viewed season of the series, forcing Univision to change its programming in the schedule of the 10pm/9c several times.

== Episodes ==
No. overall	No. in season	Title	Original release date	US viewers (millions)
343	1	"Sed de venganza"	June 20, 2017	2.27
While on the hunt, Aurelio watches from afar the operations carried out by Víctor Jr; On the other hand in Mexico the President requests an explanation to Rivero its man of confidence on the operation that is carried out from three months to find the whereabouts of Mónica Robles, since the people do not believe in him due to all the problems Which have been presented in the country in recent months. While talking to one of his men, Víctor asks this guy if he already knows anything about his wife's whereabouts since he must retrieve it as he sees fit. While reviewing the organization of the event to celebrate Independence Day Paloma tells her husband not to count on his company; To attend this event. Due to her fight with a recluse Felina communicates with Lourdes since she feels insecure to be there, since she believes that at some point they can kill her.
344	2	"Hay un Plan B"	June 21, 2017	1.97
Alba manages to communicate with her son to tell her that she is in a convent in Sinaloa and because her life is in danger she needs your help as soon as possible; But before he can do something for his Mom, Aurelio meets with a group of the army commanded by Rivero; On the other hand The president attends with his wife to the commemoration of the day of independence, without knowing that one of his enemies plans something against him, meanwhile Aurelio tries to escape of hands of Rivero, along with its men and it obtains Stop his nephew's plans. On the other hand in the convent, Alba is interrogated by one of the men who have it retained to know where one of its companions is and Emilia speaks with Lourdes since she feels that its plans of revenge against Aurelio have changed. Felina on her part, looks for the way to know who is the person who wants to kill her; While in this prison.
345	3	"Casillas contra Casillas"	June 22, 2017	2.30
When escaping from Rivero's hands, Aurelio manages to reach the convent where his mother is kidnapped; But before being able to enter this place, Aurelio and his men realize that the men of the navy are in this same place, Meanwhile Victor continues with his plans to end the life of the President. Later, Aurelio enlists his men to confront the men of the navy and meanwhile the doctor tries to save the life of Monica who went into unemployment. After confronting the men of the navy Aurelio and his men face the other group that have kidnapped to the nuns. After talking with Felina, Emilia is angry with her because of her threats. For his part, the President asks Rivero to continue with the parade as he will not be intimidated by any of his enemies.
346	4	"Tras el pez gordo"	June 23, 2017	1.81
After managing to rescue his mother, Aurelio returns to his ranch where he receives good news of the health of Mónica; To know this news Aurelio calls to Rutila so that it arrives at this site and share in family; Later Mónica manages to wake up from the coma after three months and learns that Aurelio fell in love with Emiliana and now has new plans with her; Hearing this, Mónica asks Dona Alba to talk to her son so he can get into sanity; Since his instinct tells him that Emiliana is not to be trusted. Meanwhile Rutila receives a visit from Omar since he needs to talk to her because his cousin tried to kill him twice. Later Emiliana asks Aurelio to remove from the ranch to Mónica before they have a problem between the two and Dona Alba confesses to Monica that she will go again on the side of her family; But rather takes advantage of his stay at the ranch to meet and talk with his new grandson.
347	5	"La fuga de La Felina"	June 26, 2017	1.80
After knowing that Emiliana is the daughter of Lencho Contreras, Doña Alba asks this woman for her father and finds out that he was killed; After this conversation things between Aurelio and Emiliana become tense and the lord of the heavens promises to his wife to help find the person who killed his father. Elsewhere, Emiliana speaks with her trusted man to entrust her with the mission to rescue Felina before she is extradited. Later in Ciudad de México, Rutila lists suitcases to go to the rink and reunite with his father; Although earlier it calls its new conquest; For her part, Doña Alba asks her son what happens to Emiliana since she feels that the tension has increased between the two; While Víctor prepares to carry out a new plan and Mónica talks to Ramón about what happened while she was in a coma.
348	6	"Nexos con el narcotráfico"	June 27, 2017	1.86
In the middle of the party, Emiliana learns that the plan to rescue La Felina did not go as planned; after this Emiliana looks for the way to solve this problem as soon as possible and Aurelio realizes that something is happening to her; when talking to his wife Emiliana has no choice but to tell Aurelio the truth. For his part, Lourdes gives indications to Piston to take La Felina before the police re-capture. Meanwhile in Los Angeles, Salazar continues to follow Aurelio to find out who is responsible for washing his fortune and the president meets with his team to talk about what is happening in his government. After talking to Aurelio, Mónica looks for Emiliana to talk with her about the true intentions she has with him.
349	7	"Mediadora"	June 28, 2017	1.82
Aurelio meets with his colleagues to talk about what his nephew is doing, since he can not stand this situation anymore because all the cities are falling. Meanwhile Jorge talks to Esperanza because he wants to understand why she is involved in the world of drug trafficking; And Doña Alba talks to Mónica since she wants to advise her and ask her to never hide anything from her son if she wants her relationship to last. While Aurelio talks to one of his associates, El Greñitas brings him information of the place where his nephew may be moving; And Víctor talks to his men to give them indications of what they are going to be in the country. Later, Mónica talks to Rutila about her plans; But just then Emiliana arrives and Mónica seizes the moment to make clear a few things before leaving.
350	8	"Corazón partido"	June 29, 2017	1.92
Emiliana talks to her babysitter to tell him that Aurelio is aware of his plans as he realized what he was doing while trying to get La Felina out of jail; And observing Emiliana, Doña Alba tells her grandson that she needs a man of confidence to accompany her to a place. Later, Aurelio meets with his partner to show him what his son managed to do to find Víctor and while they talk, he realizes that he hides information from where his mother is. On the other hand, Doña Alba arrives at the rancho that was of the Lencho Contreras and discovers that Lourdes is not dead as affirmed Emiliana; When leaving the house Lourdes tells Alba that his son was the person who killed his employer. After receiving a call, Salazar is informed that she must take Esperanza to the angels since they know that she is part of the drug trafficking and now she must cooperate with justice. For his part, Aurelio knows where his mother is and asks Ishmael to accompany him to Emiliana's ranch.
351	9	"Encuentros decisivos"	June 30, 2017	1.71
Upon discovering that Emiliana lied to him about the death of his babysitter, Aurelio seeks revenge on them; But his mother asks him not to retaliate against them; But wants to be away from his life; Because of this Aurelio promises not to end their lives; But surprisingly Lourdes confronts him; And after this Aurelio tells his mother to start the hunt to get Emiliana. Meanwhile Omar receives the support of the national party to strengthen his government; And for his part Salazar is presented with his superior as he seeks to propose a deal for Esperanza to be protected by law. Arriving at his ranch, Rutila asks his dad, brother and grandmother what is happening, since the attitude of the three is different. For his part, Emiliana arrives in Bogotá and meets with an attorney to find and represent a woman who is important to her.
352	10	"Esperanza, la informante"	July 3, 2017	1.80
Mónica calls Javier since he wants to return to business and for this he seeks to find new allies; Rutila receives a call from his cousin Víctor because he wants to know how his wife is. After talking to his friend; Rutila tells her grandmother that her cousin Víctor wants to see her and that is why she wants to accompany her; The next day Emiliana talks to her lawyer to collect all her money and get rid of Aurelio; But before continuing to talk to him; He realizes that a man is after her. Later, Esperanza meets with an agent to tell him everything he knows about Aurelio Casillas's business; While Felina is in charge of helping her cellmate. Upon arriving in Colombia, Aurelio calls Javier since he wants to meet with him; And the Feline receives an unexpected visit.
353	11	"Emiliana declara la guerra"	July 4, 2017	1.45
After meeting with Emiliana, Felina asks her lawyer for solutions to get out of jail, while Rutila and Doña Alba try to convince Víctor to change his plans so that there is no war between him and Aurelio; While, Mónica talks to Javier about his relationship with Aurelio. For his part, the President tells Rivero to take time off because he can not stand this situation any longer; And Aurelio talks to Javier about a favor he needs to get him as soon as possible. Later on with the information he gives about Aurelio; Hope causes a detective to handle all his accounts. After talking to Víctor, Rutila apologizes to his grandmother for making her go to this appointment; But while they talk, she receives a call from Emiliana who seeks to talk to Dona Alba to know what happened to her babysitter.
354	12	"Desaparecida"	July 5, 2017	1.77
Being in the jungle Mónica and Aurelio revive their love story; And while they speak Aurelio, he tells her that many things happened while he was in a coma and for this he must make a decision to join him or go with Víctor. For his part, Esperanza tells Jorge that he is very afraid of what can happen to him when Aurelio knows that she betrays him by giving all her fortune to the DEA; Meanwhile Emiliana looks for the gentleman who indicated La Felina and García has an affair with Rivero so that he does everything possible and takes it out of the prison as quickly as possible. On the other hand, Víctor finds out that there are people who are moving in their zones and Javier realizes that Ismael has problems with the accounts that Esperanza handled.
355	13	"Despiertan al Diablo"	July 6, 2017	1.83
Mónica calls her cousin Omar to tell her that they should be reunited since she will resume her business and for this she will have to teach her some things; Rutila tells his brother that what his mother publishes on social networks is very dangerous for everyone. In the meantime; Felina is visited in jail by Javier since he wants to help her out of this place and Victor is in charge of making an operation against Aurelio and his men; Meanwhile, Esperanza suffers a panic attack since Aurelio discovered that she betrayed him. Later, Emiliana calls her lawyer to find out how her friend's case is going; As she needs to get her out of jail as quickly as possible.
356	14	"Lluvia de balas"	July 7, 2017	1.68
Rivero and García continue to investigate the life of Aurelio and now they obtain more evidence in its favor; For her part Monica receives very little merchandise to continue with her business and for this reason she calls Javier since she broke her deal. In the middle of the confrontation with Víctor; The engineer calls Aurelio to tell him this situation since they need reinforcements; When he finds himself in trouble, Víctor realizes that the fight is lost and for this he withdraws; When leaving this situation the engineer is visited by Aurelio who takes this fact in a funny way, which makes him give up to continue helping him. For her part, Dona Alba helps her granddaughter Rutila to organize a romantic dinner, which she will have with her new conquest and her brother. Later, Esperanza arrives in her new City where she will be subject to the witness protection program and will now be known as Martha. Being calmer Aurelio talks with the engineer about the decisions that his nephew Victor has made; But before continuing with his pact the engineer tells him that he must learn to respect them.
357	15	"Plomo en casa de Rutila"	July 10, 2017	1.86
Mónica talks to her man of confidence since now she must meet personally with the paramilitaries; In another part, Salazar tells Rivero that Esperanza decided to help them with the information of the operations of Aurelio and thus to finish once and for all with him; Meanwhile Omar is informed that he must remain in his room since his friend has been beating his companion; Later, Aurelio asks him to look at his computer to find out how his bank accounts are going on and finds out that Salazar, Rivero and Esperanza have conspired against him. Later on, Felina finds out that her court date was advanced and Esperanza's father is looking for a person to help him find his daughter as soon as possible. Finally, Víctor talks to his trusted man to recruit more people for his next plans.
358	16	"El soplón"	July 11, 2017	1.86
After visiting his daughter, Aurelio learns that the army is behind him; For which he tries to handle this situation. For his part Víctor arrives in Medellín to talk business with one of the most important drug traffickers in this country. While, Javier and his people prepare to carry out the plan to rescue the Feline. After leaving Víctor of the property of double 30, this one tells Mónica that it can betray it since it has more important businesses with Víctor. Later Sebastián speaks to Salazar because he does not think to collaborate to him more, after what the army did in the house of his girlfriend and Rutila is visited in its house by Rivero; Later, La Felina encounters Aurelio after being rescued by Javier.
359	17	"Emiliana suplica por su vida"	July 12, 2017	1.81
Upon learning that the Felina managed to escape from prison; Emiliana feels anguished since she thinks that someone very important is behind all this; So he calls the Feline man of trust to know if she is in Muso. For his part Aurelio is responsible for hunting his prey. Meanwhile Víctor is in charge of checking the bar before traveling since everything on his return must be ready; And Mónica visits Javier to contrale that he did very well for Medellin. Later, Emiliana tells the truth to Andres because he is the only person he can trust and Ismael realizes that all his parents' bank accounts are at zero. The next morning the Feline receives the visit of men sent by Velandia.
360	18	"El presidente como cómplice"	July 13, 2017	1.79
Víctor continues to look for boys to join his army against his own family; While the crosshairs manages to find the whereabouts of this man and now follows in his footsteps; For his part, Aurelio manages to find Emiliana, after a long hunt; And having her face to face, Emiliana tries to explain to Aurelio why she did what she did. Meanwhile, Felina along with the men of Aurelio manages to enter the house of Velandia. After the visit of a policeman to his house, Rutila calls to Monica since now they have problems because of the businesses that they did in the past. Esperanza prepares to start her new life as Maestra and Rivero tells Salazar about a new track, so his help is indispensable.
361	19	"Tambores de guerra"	July 14, 2017	1.49
Doña Alba calls Aurelio and wants to propose that he try to solve things with his grandson, because he can not stand this situation anymore. Arriving in Mexico Monica meets with her cousin at the airport because she wants to talk to him about new business; Later Aurelio calls his nephew Víctor and he tells him that in order to speak face to face he needs to be handed over to Mónica. Meanwhile in Muso; Felina tells Pilar the story of her father and younger brother. Aurelio talks to his mother to tell him that I call Victor to settle their differences, but due to his stubbornness take other measures. In the middle of their conversation, Omar tells Mónica that she can not stand the coexistence with his wife anymore.
362	20	"Fuego cruzado"	July 17, 2017	1.86
When finding the whereabouts of Víctor, Aurelio meets with the engineer since they must take measures on the matter. Dona Alba talks to her granddaughter since she is very worried about what may happen between the meeting of her grandson and her son; And also asks Rutila to stay away from Mónica since she does not want him to lose everything he has been able to get clean. Meanwhile Sebastian calls Salazar to contrale that Rutila received a call from a woman named Mónica. In another place, Mónica embarks on a trip to the Angels since there must meet with a very important man for its businesses; But knowing that it is Tony Pastrana, Monica thinks that things may not go as she expects them.
363	21	"Desenmascarar al presidente"	July 18, 2017	1.84
After being shot by his uncle, Víctor is torn between life and death; When arriving at Los Angeles Mónica, is with a man named Rubén who asks that to be able to speak with her it must go without escorts and Tony is informed that its exit ticket is already ready. For his part Sebastian asks Rutila to tell him what is happening to help her. Later, the President asks Rivero to cover the shooting that was presented in the place where he is since he does not want anyone to know about this event. When arriving at Bogota Pilar tells the Feline that if the place in which they are not very dangerous for them, after facing his nephew; The greasy man tells Aurelio that his accounts are empty.
364	22	"Choque de titanes"	July 19, 2017	1.77
Knowing the current state of their bank accounts, Aurelio does not give up and tells his son that they will return to business; And ask your daughter for help. In the middle of the operative Salazar tells Rivero that they are following to Rutila and for this they count on the aid of their fianc2e. Recovering from the bullet his uncle gave him, Victor thinks about what they will do now. Meanwhile Esperanza's mother asks her ex-husband to stop looking for his daughter since she does not want to know if she may be dead. Javier meets with Felina since she wants to be a member of the business that he proposed. Ismael tells his grandmother about the experience she experienced in confronting her cousin and Monica meets Tony Pastrana.
365	23	"Más poder, segura venganza"	July 20, 2017	1.51
Aurelio is with a member of the guerrilla as he needs his group to provide him with merchandise. Arriving home, Sebastian meets the two agents of the DEA. Javier says goodbye to Felina and Pilar since the two are going to be a time outside the country. Rutila calls to Monica to contrale that Victor can be dead. Omar receives in his office Jose and Jaime since they must talk about the investigation that is taking against him, and Juan Carlos does not give up to find his daughter hope. Rivero tells Evelyn that the DEA is conducting an investigation against Rutila.
366	24	"Robo cibernético"	July 21, 2017	1.65
Víctor continues to recover from his wound and while he is at the head of his business he learns that one of the drug traffickers with whom he does business, is also doing it with Monica. For his part, Aurelio makes a desperate decision to see that his finances do not improve; And when he learns about his father's plans, Ishmael complains that he wants to betray his daughter. After observing the collection of paintings, Rutila asks to him that Sebastián helps to take the certificates of the works since it urges him to sell them. Meanwhile, Salazar tries to find clues from Esperanza and Rivero talks to Uscateguii about the information he has to unmask more than one person from the Government. For her part, Monica is worried after the talk she had with Rutila.
367	25	"El punto débil"	July 24, 2017	1.90
After the discussion with his son, Aurelio looks for him in the university to talk with him. For his part, Tony Pastrana is in charge of finding people to carry out their purposes against the Casillas. Salazar does not give up and manages to find his wife. While Rivero meets with the parents of Esperanza since they are desperate since more than a month they do not have news of his daughter. Victor learns of the plans that his wife is going to carry out; And Monica visits Rutila to help her with a new business; While the Greñas continues to review Rutila's accounts and also continues the search for Esperanza. Finally, Rivero learns that Omar ordered to investigate.
368	26	"El imperio de Casillas"	July 25, 2017	1.83
When arriving in Spain Felina and Pilar are responsible for making new relationships to enlarge their business in this area; While Aurelio learns that Monica is doing business with people related to Tony Pastrana and also learns that he is out of jail. When checking their accounts, Rutila realizes that something happened and Mónica comes face to face with Víctor after a long time.
369	27	"Un remolino de poder"	July 26, 2017	1.89
After his unexpected reunion with Víctor, Monica is taken by force by this guy. For his part, Omar goes back to see his friend Javier and wants to offer him a deal. Meanwhile, Víctor asks one of his men to investigate everything related to Tony Pastrana. After the loss of money of his account, Rutila talks with the people of the bank to know that happened and when finding out that it could be a car robbery, Rutila realizes that his father was who took this money. Tony finds out they found one of Aurelio's sons and so he decides to travel to Mexico. Columbus asks Salazar if he was looking for Esperanza, because he does not believe that he was sick. Upon reaching his mine Javier encounters one of his enemies.
370	28	"Plan sangriento"	July 27, 2017	1.64
Seeing that Mónica does not answer the phone, Double Thirty is worried because his money is involved. Felina calls Sutamerchan to tell her to return to Colombia and the Tata continues with her relapses of health. El Greñas tells Ismael that he found some collectors to whom they can sell the works. Rivero tells Evelyn she can not stand another minute to see her in jail; Since if they can continue with the investigation she would be in danger. Salazar is visited by Esperanza's parents, because they need to know what happened to her. Victor asks Ramon if something happened between Mónica and Aurelio while she was recovering. Aurelio travels to Colombia in order to meet with the Paramilitary Chief.
371	29	"Casillas vs. Doble 30"	July 28, 2017	1.48
The wife of Nazareno calls Ishmael because they have many economic problems and need him to help them out of this situation. Doble Treinta agrees to speak with Aurelio and in the middle of his talk Aurelio asks this paramilitary not to do business with Mónica since he could have problems with Víctor. Omar asks his wife to accompany him to an important dinner he will have with an old friend and with whom he will talk about business. Ismael talks to his teacher about the decisions he must make before leaving the family business and Rutila tells his grandmother that his father was the one who stole the 5 million dollars from his bank account. Mónica asks a solution to Víctor to let her leave his side.
372	30	"El escudo ante la guerra"	July 31, 2017	1.72
Omar visits Rutila because he is worried about his cousin, since for some time he has not answered his calls. On the other hand, Víctor decides to visit Rutila and his grandmother since he wants to apologize for having made them believe that he was dead. In another place Javier tells Aurelio that there is not enough drug that he needs to continue his business and in the middle of this conversation Ismael calls his father to tell him that his brother Nazareno was killed because of Tony Pastrana. When seeing the security cameras that installed in the house of the Tata, Rivero realizes that Navarrete is in this same place. After a long journey, La Felina meets with a man from his past. Later, Javier promises Aurelio to help him get back up to avenge the death of his son.
373	31	"Siniestro en el antro"	August 1, 2017	1.78
When calling to the house of its daughter, Víctor speaks with Aurelio because he wants to propose new treatments to him and the Felina finds out on the part of the father of his son what really happened to his first-born; after the conversation he had with Raymundo and La Felina lets you understand that things between the two are already different. After the fight with the girl, Monica looks for a way out of this place before Victor returns; for his part, Pilar is again facing his addictions and now struggles not to fall back into this temptation; in the middle of dinner Paloma and Omar have a discussion in front of Javier. Upon arriving at the Feline's house, Aurelio meets Raymundo. When trying to leave the brothel in which her husband was held, Monica confronts her two trusted people and Victor learns that his wife is in danger.
374	32	"Conexión presidencial"	August 2, 2017	1.78
Seeing that the relationship with Zoe can be finished, Esperanza reveals to him its true identity; Doña Alba calls her grandson Ismael since she needs to tell him that Víctor is alive and Monica may be in danger; after talking to his grandmother Ismael asks Greenas to take care of his sister-in-law; to know what happened in the bar, Sebastián calls Salazar to tell him that apparently his goal is on this site, after an intense search Víctor manages to find Monica. After meeting Raymundo, Aurelio asks Felina to speak alone and wants to propose new business. With the arrival of Rivero at his cousin's bar, Rutila offers to be able to intervene in this matter and after spoiling the operation he wanted to carry out Rivero called the President to tell him that he stopped Rutila.
375	33	"La jugada de Terán"	August 3, 2017	1.66
376	34	"Los Casillas frente a frente"	August 4, 2017	1.57
377	35	"Cita sangrienta"	August 7, 2017	2.25
378	36	"El plan inesperado"	August 8, 2017	2.18
379	37	"Infeliz encuentro"	August 9, 2017	1.88
380	38	"Escándalo a la vista"	August 10, 2017	1.99
381	39	"El presidente, un sicario"	August 11, 2017	1.76
382	40	"Callar a un testigo clave"	August 14, 2017	2.00
383	41	"Más de una baja"	August 15, 2017	2.02
384	42	"Rodean a los Casillas"	August 16, 2017	1.95
385	43	"Drones, balas y allanamiento"	August 17, 2017	1.98
386	44	"Condenados a morir"	August 18, 2017	1.74
387	45	"Declara o destapan la olla"	August 21, 2017	2.14
388	46	"Rivero firma su sentencia"	August 22, 2017	2.09
389	47	"Rutila en la mira"	August 23, 2017	1.96
390	48	"Callan al informante"	August 25, 2017	1.86
391	49	"Contra la pared"	August 28, 2017	2.11
392	50	"Morir, antes que entregarse"	August 29, 2017	2.11
393	51	"Al pie de la letra"	August 30, 2017	2.03
394	52	"¿Traición a la patria?"	August 31, 2017	2.05
395	53	"Pilar muere de celos"	September 1, 2017	1.62
396	54	"Triángulo de amor"	September 4, 2017	2.10
397	55	"Ninón "se encarga" de su rival"	September 6, 2017	2.44
398	56	"La estampida de Esperanza"	September 7, 2017	2.14
399	57	"La frustración de Mónica"	September 8, 2017	1.77
400	58	"Casillas jura vengarse"	September 11, 2017	2.09
401	59	"Uzcátegui, en terreno movedizo"	September 12, 2017	1.75
402	60	"Una trampa para Aurelio"	September 13, 2017	2.14
After learning of the death of his wife, Aurelio remembers the moments that shared with her and now looks for the way to withstand the pain that feels by this lost. In the middle of the event Monica makes a proposal to the Feline; and Raymundo calls Leandro to tell him that in Europe the sale of the drug is moving very well. After speaking with Raymundo, Leandro communicates with the commander Penumbras to invite him to meet so that he can talk about new alliances. Rutila tells her sister-in-law that things in their lives will change from now on and for this they will support each other. While talking to the Feline, Monica takes the time to ask about the new woman who has Aurelio.
403	61	"La Felina no come cuentos"	September 14, 2017	1.81
After learning of the possible death of Pilar, the Feline and Aurelio make the decision to go to the morgue to identify the body; but just then the Madame arrives and Feline asks Aurelio to take this woman away before a fight is struck between the two. Upon entering Monica's room, Tony reads a letter she left before leaving. Rutila takes some time alone to talk to his brother about the proposal that Uscategui made and Greenas calls Skinny to give him the exact location where Esperanza is. Later, Aurelio stays alone with Pilar to say goodbye to her and Monica makes a radical decision after seeing that Tony use it.
404	62	"Peligrosa atracción"	September 15, 2017	1.67
While in the hotel Esperanza realizes that the men of Casillas managed to find his whereabouts. Elsewhere, the Feline asks Aurelio if he is now interested in Madame and Monica remembers her older brother; to see the state in which is its patroness Ramón tries to calm it. After leaving things clear to his partner, Aurelio tells him to give in the name of Pilar and the Engineer claims his wife to hide his health problems. In the middle of the dinner, Carmen tries to seduce Ismael without anyone noticing it. After telling the truth to her husband, Tata tells Navarrete that she is training her friend so that the day she dies, he is next to a good woman. Finally, Tony looks for Monica to ask him not to leave his side.
405	63	"De cara a la prensa"	September 18, 2017	1.95
After talking to her daughter, Pina asks her ex-husband to return to Venezuela since she wants them not to be in danger. Meanwhile Felina follows the track of her friend's cell phone with the help of Sutamerchan and La Niña. On the other hand, Pao claims Ismael for the attitude of his sister-in-law and Carmen realizes that Rutila spent the night with Javier. Castillo meets with the President since he wants to know what information has the poster of Tony Pastrana. Later Monica calls her cousin to meet again. On the other hand, the Madame asks her trusted man to investigate Raymundo and Aurelio feels that it is time for him to go for Esperanza.
406	64	"Ex amantes que negocian"	September 19, 2017	1.87
Upon learning of the illness of his wife, El Ingeniero decides to accompany her to the doctor so that she begins with the treatment as soon as possible. Esperanza calls Mónica to know if she can trust her when they see each other and after seeing that her employer has hung up this call; Ramón talks about a proposal for Aurelio to return his son. In another place La Madame receives an unexpected visit of the Feline; who arrives to his house to accept the apology that asked him previously and thus to be able to clarify things. Later Salazar tells Colon that he has clues of the drug shipment that are waiting in Europe. Back in Madrid, Aurelio calls Mónica to meet and Tony asks one of his men to investigate the tankers who are going to get to the City.
407	65	"Rastrean a Esperanza"	September 20, 2017	1.95
After the conversation he had with Aurelio, Monica calls Esperanza to ask him to take care of himself since Aurelio will not rest until he can find her; Upon learning this, Esperanza decides to communicate with Ismael and ask him directly why he is doing all these things. In another place Monica talks to Rutila to tell her that she will be back to the City and Sutamerchan and the Girl tell the Feline that they were able to see that the car that was in the house of the Madame; but Felina tells them that he will not attack her until she has collected all the evidence against her. Meanwhile, Castillo tells Salazar that he is in Sebastian's apartment but has not been able to find any trace of him.
408	66	"Más que un mensajero"	September 21, 2017	1.90
When meeting with El Ingeniero, Ismael learns of the illness that suffers his mother; meanwhile the Tata remembers to Aurelio; but just at that moment Ishmael enters his room to ask his mother for an explanation. Rutila receives a call from his father who informs him that the police are investigating Sebastián's whereabouts and after hearing this conversation, Javier thinks about how to tell Aurelio what is happening with his daughter. Pao tells his friend that he can not stop thinking about Ismael and Juan Carlos remembers the moments that he lived with his ex-wife. Meanwhile, Columbus calls Ali to ask for more information on the drug that will arrive in Europe and Salazar realizes that he is being persecuted.
409	67	"Torturan a Salazar"	September 22, 2017	1.99
On seeing what happened in the place where Ali was found, La Madame thinks that this was not an attack, but that it must have been a matter of work. In the meantime Penunbras receives some photos of the subject that his men managed to retain and when he sees these photos, Aurelio tells Penumbras that he is happy about the day as he has a few things to do with this man. Elsewhere, Paloma is relapsed again; so Castillo asks the President to take her to the emergency room and Colón decides to call Castillo to tell him that Salazar did not show up at the point where he was leaving Venezuela. After a long journey Esperanza manages to reach the place where she is going to meet Tony and Mónica notices the approach of Rutila with Javier.
410	68	"Alianza para matar"	September 25, 2017	1.94
After learning what Aurelio did, Mónica calls Esperanza to tell him that Salazar was kidnapped by the guerrillas and now Aurelio was in charge of getting information from him; to see the state in which Mónica is, Javier takes the time to ask who he was talking to because he feels very tense. In the meantime, Aurelio continues to torture Salazar so that the information will lead him to find his ex-partner and Esperanza communicates with Colón to ask if it is true that Salazar is in the hands of his enemy. Later, Raymundo meets with Leandro, Doble 30 and Penumbras to talk about the problem they have with Mexicans and Tony meets with his guest.
411	69	"De hombre a hombre"	September 26, 2017	1.92
Realizing that his friend is investigating his wife, Ismael learns that she is Arelis' best friend. When arriving at the house of his daughter, Aurelio demands to him to Javier to mess with his women and because of this situation Javier asks Aurelio to speak alone to clarify this subject; in another place Arelis reveals the truth to his best friend of his situation of love and Aurelio seizes the moment to know the children of Nazareno. While having breakfast with his wife Juan Carlos tells him of the new plans that he wants to develop in Mexico and Tony asks Esperanza if he thought about the proposal that did him. Colón and Castillo are looking for ways to enter the Colombian jungles without the guerrilla realizing that they are in this place.
412	70	"Testigo, pero no cómplice"	September 27, 2017	2.04
While talking with Aurelio, this one reminds Mónica of the important moments that lived in Guadalajara; meanwhile Raymundo tries to convince his wife that the best way to continue in the business is to eliminate the Mexicans and Javier tells Rutila what I talk to his dad. For his part, Ismael asks the Greenas to be aware of a ship that is loaded with cocaine and after a long journey Colon and Castillo manage to enter a Colombian jungle where they believe that Salazar may be kidnapped. Later, Aurelio takes the opportunity to talk with his daughter about the relationship he has with Javier and also wants to tell him what he thinks of her. Penunbras and Leandro talk about the successful businesses they are doing abroad.
413	71	"Traición o negocios"	September 28, 2017	2.08
After Aurelio's visit, Rutila asks Carmen to be careful about approaching him too much because she knows what the extent of her father has. On the other hand La Güera asks El Ingeniero and Ismael if they are going to fulfill the will of the Tata and Aurelio arrives at the house of this woman so that they speak alone of its state of health and its son Ismael. After rescuing Salazar, Castillo Colón travel to Europe in order to stop the drug shipment that is about to arrive at this place. The journalists who work with Uscategui propose that they interview the first lady since she can give them important information about Omar Terán and Felina tells Raymundo that he is ungrateful for going against Aurelio.
414	72	"La depresión de Esperanza"	September 29, 2017	2.00
After finding out that Pao knows Salazar and Arelis, Isamel looks for it to explain this situation to him; On the other hand, Colón tells his men that they were able to find the location of the oil ship and that they do not have problems with Venezuela; act in accordance with the protocol. In another place Juan Carlos, talks to Arelis about the distance that he had with Pina during their marriage and Mónica tells Esperanza that Rutila and Javier are leaving. After clarifying matters with Ismael, Pao asks him to help her get her boyfriend to her best friend and Aurelio asks directly to Raymundo if he met behind his back with Penumbras.
415	73	"La retirada de Casillas"	October 2, 2017	2.09
Seeing the state of mind in which Esperanza is, Mónica tries to advise her to get out of this situation. In another place Aurelio the Madame and Raymundo make themselves present in the port to know that people are the ones who want to spoil its cargo and Penunbras learns that the people of the DEA has not spoken of the kidnapping of Salazar. Doble Treinta is in charge of setting up an operation to receive Mónica and her new partner. Ali communicates with Tony to tell him that he has his eyes on Aurelio although the place is full of undercover agents and cops, so the plans against him would be a risk. Elsewhere, Pao tries to convince her friend to go out with one of Ismael's friends and Felina tells El Ingeniero and Tata that now she will only concentrate on the emerald business.
416	74	"Treinta toneladas lo valen"	October 3, 2017	2.08
Aurelio asks his new partner what their contribution will be for the operation they are going to carry out, since they must recover the merchandise to the place. On the other hand, Omar learns of the blow that the authorities made to the drug traffickers and because of this he is worried about what people can think of his Government; but just at that moment Paloma again has a strong relapse. Esperanza tells Mónica that she is very worried about what happened to Aurelio's cargo and Mónica asks Tony to tell her the truth. Raymundo calls his wife to ask for a new help and Javier asks Rutila to visit him in Colombia. Castillo proposes to his friends to continue searching for clues that lead him to find the whereabouts of Aurelio.
417	75	"El secuestro"	October 4, 2017	1.97
After the call he received from the President, Castillo thinks that he is passing information on the cargo to Aurelio. When he wakes up, Paloma tells his lover that he feels very bad, El Ingeniero thinks about the moments he has lived next to La Tata and seeing that everything that affects him, this man decides to call Aurelio to ask him to leave to collaborate in his affairs while he is outside of Mexico. Meanwhile, Ismael is in charge of coordinating the operation that they are going to carry out to recover the merchandise and Aurelio takes the time to be alone with the Madame to tell him that he is distrusting his trusted man. Finally, Tony tells Mónica that he is going to kidnap Ninon's son.
418	76	"Casillas al rescate"	October 5, 2017	2.06
Juan Carlos tries to convince Arelis so that she can get closer to Aurelio. Penunbras arrives at Javier's camp to ask for his help and Mónica tells Tony that apparently the Colombians will no longer make deals with the Mexicans. Juliana asks Javier for explanations about his change of attitude and receives a very sincere response from him that does not leave her feeling happy then he warns Rutila that he has fulfilled what was promised. Mabel remembers the last time she saw Chema Venegas while having a conversation with Aurelio about Tony Pastrana and his intentions to take his son away. Mónica asks Rafel to stand firm or advise him to look for a new distributor.
419	77	"Sicariato"	October 6, 2017	N/A
Omar decides to give a wheel of prey to make it clear to the Mexicans that he has no evidence to ensure that Aurelio Casillas is still alive. After being present in this interview, Uzcategui asks Castillo to help her by moving her influences to know the true state of health of the first lady and El Ingeniero asks his wife to stop taking as this would further affect his condition of health. Ninón asks his trusted man to get all the videos the police have so he can find his son as soon as possible. Upon entering his wife's room, Omar realizes that Paloma has escaped from this place and Simón tells Ninón that in order to help her she should not intervene anyone else in this matter.
420	78	"El coraje de Ninón"	October 9, 2017	1.96
Omar decides to give a wheel of prey to make it clear to the Mexicans that he has no evidence to ensure that Aurelio Casillas is still alive. After being present in this interview, Uzcategui asks Castillo to help her by moving her influences to know the true state of health of the first lady and El Ingeniero asks his wife to stop taking as this would further affect his condition of health. Ninón asks his trusted man to get all the videos the police have so he can find his son as soon as possible. Upon entering his wife's room, Omar realizes that Paloma has escaped from this place and Simón tells Ninón that in order to help her she should not intervene anyone else in this matter.
421	79	"Casillas y sus dos batallas"	October 10, 2017	1.97
Tony tells Mónica that Ninón manages to discover the place where his son was kidnapped; after learning of this, Mónica tells her partner that she is wrong leaving this woman alive since she will never forgive what made him happen to the person he loves the most. Meanwhile, Aurelio and his men are in charge of starting the hunt and Skynni tells his cousin that Navarrete is responsible for sending more people so that they can end once and for all with Esperanza. La Guera asks El Ingeniero to invite her to another glass so they can get to know each other better. Paloma asks her lover to leave before her husband finds her; because he is afraid of what can happen to him and Ismael is in charge of that the operation that was entrusted to him is a complete success.
422	80	"Arrasan con todo"	October 11, 2017	2.07
Aurelio proposes to Ninón that they go to Mexico since from there they can continue with the operations without problems; but his partner tells him that she can not return to this place since her life would be in danger. Tony asks Mónica to introduce him to his cousin; but before this woman proposes a new deal. Omar asks his escorts to leave him alone with his wife. In the middle of his journey to reach the airport Raymundo communicates with Ismael to tell him that things went as they had agreed and Colón tells his friends to find another place to land since on the track Aurelio's men would finish them . Felina learns the cause of the death of her friend Pilar.
423	81	"El poder del billete"	October 12, 2017	2.07
Skinny asks El Ingeniero to let him finish off with Tony Pastrana once and for all. Juan Carlos shows Arelis a chip that I have to do to find Aurelio Casillas. Rutila calls Javier to know what are the problems that Colombians are having with them. Penunbras communicates with Leandro to ask that he be an inn at his house and Ninon says goodbye to his son. Raymundo proposes to La Felina that they go to Paris since it wants to celebrate that they could recover the shipment. After hearing the conversation of Penunbras, Javier decides to remove it from its territory. Uscatequi asks for an explanation about the rumors of the first lady's state of health. Omar tells Jaime that things are coming out as they were agreed upon. Mónica asks her cousin to see her because she wants to introduce her to someone very important.
424	82	"En busca de El Chema"	October 13, 2017	N/A
Ninón asks Aurelio what place he now occupies in his life; since he wants him to forget about his ex-partner. Felina tells Raymundo that he agrees with what he thinks but he will not stop doing business with the Mexicans. Tony offers Omar much more money than Aurelio offered him. Filemon tells his employer that Casillas is able to recover the merchandise that was taken away by the authorities and is now doing business in France. In the midst of a discussion with Ninón, the Felina finds out the true identity of this woman. Ismael gives a big surprise to his sister and Mónica. Maira tells the President that his wife's mother has not stopped calling to find out how her daughter is.
425	83	"Amante incrédulo"	October 16, 2017	2.04
After a little talk with Mónica and Rutila, Leonardo proposes to help him find his father. Leandro asks Penumbras that while he is at home he should not see the girl who is training to be his wife. Rutila finds out that Salazar arrived at his house because he wants to ask him some questions about his ex-boyfriend Sebastián. Raymundo asks his wife to stop fighting with Ninón since she thinks she is like this because this woman is with her partner. Aurelio asks Mabel if she had anything to do with Pilar's death. Leonardo asks Monica to tell him what person Rutila is talking about and Leandro decides to agree to talk to Susana's mom. Doble Treinta talks to one of his men to talk about the new production they must do and Omar finds out that his wife suffered a cardiac arrest.
426	84	"Presidente sin escrúpulos"	October 17, 2017	N/A
Upon learning that his wife suffered a cardiac arrest, Omar tells Jaime that they are already passing; because he does not believe that Paloma leaves this crisis; but upon arriving at the Presidential House Omar learns that the doctors were able to revive her. Korina claims to Colón for letting him remove the cargo that they managed to seize and while talking with Carmen, Leonardo learns that her husband died because of Tony Pastrana who is also a partner of Mónica. Arelis tells his best friend that I enjoy the time I spend with Greñas. Aurelio calls his son to tell him that they will go hunting in Chicago. Mabel tells the Felina that happened to Pilar for her is already a closed case and Omar calls Maira to tell him that his wife has just died.
427	85	"El blanco es Esperanza"	October 18, 2017	1.78
After the death of Mrs. Paloma, Castillo asks Maira to give her information about the doctors who attended her. Aurelio tells El Ingeniero that they will see in Chicago since he wants to get rid of Esperanza; but when leaving the house this woman realizes that someone observes them. In the middle of the confrontation with Casillas's men, Tony tells Esperanza to take care that he is safe and the Girl is injured. Ismael finds out that his mother is getting worse because of the problem she has with alcohol. Arelis tells his friend that he has not stopped thinking for a second Greñas and Juan Carlos agrees to meet Salazar. After being attacked, Tony tells Esperanza that they will go to Mexico since in Chicago they are not sure. Upon seeing the state in which his cousin is, Skinny asks El Ingeniero for help.
428	86	"¿Infiltrados?"	October 19, 2017	2.06
Upon arriving at the house of his daughter, Aurelio learns that Rutila went to spend a few days in Colombia and Mónica takes the opportunity to welcome Mabel to the family. Penunbras asks Leandro if he could solve his family problems; but just at that moment this man receives a call from Raymundo who tells him to return to Colombia as quickly as possible. Felina asks Simón to have the coroner tape a video explaining what happened to his friend. Javier tells Rutila that he is not sure she wants to live in the jungle with him. Monica looks for Aurelio to talk alone about the presence of Mabel in the house and Penunbras asks his partner to finish Javier to stay with his business. Juan Carlos risked his life to speak with Casillas.
429	87	"Oídos sordos"	October 20, 2017	1.81
After finding the house of Aurelio, Juan Carlos has no choice but to tell him how he did in order to find his hiding place; but before making deals with Esperanza's father; Aurelio asks him to give the address where his ex-wife is. Salazar tells Arelis that he needs his help in order to help Esperanza and for this he needs to tell him everything his parents are doing. Meanwhile, La Tata organizes a new plan for her husband to notice her friend. Ismael tells Greenas that he believes Juan Carlos found his father's whereabouts through Arelis; but right then, Aurelio tells his son that they were able to find them by means of the woman with whom he is leaving.
430	88	"La próxima víctima"	October 23, 2017	N/A
After remembering the last moments of the life of his father-in-law, his wife Jimena and what he lived with his other women; Aurelio communicates with Mónica to tell her that she has retained the parents of Esperanza. Arelis looks for Pao to tell him that I use his friendship to find the location of Casillas; since his boss Juan Carlos Salvatierra realized that his daughter was doing business with the narcos. After listening to her friend, Pao tells him that Ismael wants to see her again and Mónica tries to explain to Aurelio because she was helping Esperanza. Rutila asks Javier if he will accept Quesada's invitation to his estate. Castillo seeks the first lady's doctor to know if she may have been poisoned.
431	89	"Casillas se queda con Isidro"	October 24, 2017	N/A
After learning that the Navy managed to pass the second ring of security Aurelio prepares to face them. Meanwhile Mónica takes care of getting her son and the others out before things get out of control. Felina tells Ahmed that he is sure that he was the moment they attacked Simón. When entering the estate of Aurelio, Colón realizes that this man set a trap for them. El Ingeniero tells Tata that because of his son they found the house where Aurelio was hiding. Espereanza tells Tony that he must go alone to the appointment with Casillas because if he accompanies his life would be in danger. Mabel arrives at Rutila's house to demand that Mónica deliver him to Isidro.
432	90	"Sin piedad"	October 25, 2017	N/A
After an unexpected confrontation against Ahmed, this one decides to end the life of Sutamerchan and before dying La Felina tells him that he will not give up until avenging his death. After the tense meeting with the President, the doctor of the First Lady communicates with Castillo since he wants to tell you what he could find out in his videos. Navarrete is surprised by the Guera when he arrives at his house. Salazar tells Arelis to take care of his security and that of his friend and Colón advises his partner to try to have a relationship with her so she can forget Esperanza. Felina tells Aurelio that he killed Ahmed after he confessed that he was the person who killed Pilar.
433	91	"El momento de la verdad"	October 27, 2017	2.04
After knowing Tony's plan, Esperanza decides not to risk the lives of her parents and that is why she asks Tony to let her go alone to this date. After listening to Mabel, Aurelio asks if he feels guilty about what happened with Pilar. Javier asks Rutila to concentrate on them because Esperanza can not do anything. Before seeing Aurelio, Esperanza says goodbye to Tony and he uses the moment to give him some tools with which he can defend himself. Omar gives a speech to dismiss his wife and also uses the moment to give the ashes to his family.
434	92	"Casillas gana otra vez"	October 30, 2017	2.13
After knowing Tony's plan, Esperanza decides not to risk the lives of her parents and that is why she asks Tony to let her go alone to this date. After listening to Mabel, Aurelio asks if he feels guilty about what happened with Pilar. Javier asks Rutila to concentrate on them because Esperanza can not do anything. Before seeing Aurelio, Esperanza says goodbye to Tony and he uses the moment to give him some tools with which he can defend himself. Omar gives a speech to dismiss his wife and also uses the moment to give the ashes to his family.
435	93	"Caen en la trampa"	October 31, 2017	N/A
After being shot by Aurelio, Esperanza asks her father for forgiveness. Aurelio communicates with Monica to give Tony a message. Colón asks Salvartierra if he is going to take the bodies of his wife and his daughter to Venezuela but before leaving to return to his country, Juan Carlos proposes a deal to Colón to end with Casillas. Meanwhile, Carmen talks with Ismael to seek alternative treatments to address her mother's health problem. Uscategui arrives at the hospital to find out how Castillo continues. While they remain on Leandro's farm, Javier tells Rutila that the rumors of the Colombians with the Mexicans are true.
436	94	"Al rescate de Rutila"	November 1, 2017	2.22
After talking with his daughter, Aurelio decides to advance his trip to Colombia. Javier tells Rutila that they must find a way out of the Leandro estate as a place. Tony tells Mónica that he will not lose hope with her and for this he will try to win her back no matter what the cost. Mabel asks Carmen to tell her what she is hiding. Maira tells Colón that she trusted the President and now wants to know what will happen to her if it is known that Omar killed his wife the First Lady. Leandro tells his wife that he must be ready because there may be strange movements on the farm.
437	95	"La sombra de la muerte"	November 2, 2017	2.54
