= En las buenas y en las malas (film) =

2019 Mexican comedy-drama film

- Film poster
- Directed by: Gabriel Barragán Sentíes
- Screenplay by: Guillermo Amoedo
- Story by: Nicolás López; Ángel Pulido
- Starring: Zuria Vega; Alberto Guerra
- Cinematography: Antonio Quercia
- Edited by: Patricia Trujillo
- Music by: Edher Corte
- Production companies: Bh5; Sobras International Pictures
- Distributed by: BF Distribution
- Release date: 15 March 2019 (Mexico)
- Country: Mexico
- Language: Spanish

En las buenas y en las malas (lit. 'For better, for worse') is a 2019 Mexican comedy-drama film directed by Gabriel Barragán Sentíes. The film premiered on 15 March 2019, and is stars Zuria Vega, and Alberto Guerra. The plot revolves around Sebastián and Valeria. One day, Valeria learns that she is pregnant and Sebastian decides to ask her to marry him. Everything is going perfect until Pamela appears, a young woman who works with him and is determined to seduce him. It is an adaptation of the Chilean film Qué pena tu boda, and sequel to Qué pena tu vida.

== Plot ==
The story follows Valeria and Sebastián, a couple who have been together for three years and seem to have a stable, happy relationship. Their lives take a turn when Valeria discovers she is pregnant, and Sebastián decides to propose. As their wedding day approaches, doubts and fears about commitment begin to surface for both of them.

The situation becomes even more complicated when Pamela, one of Sebastián’s coworkers, tries to seduce him. Her interest in him—combined with the pressure of the upcoming marriage—puts their relationship on shaky ground. Sebastián struggles with the idea of losing his freedom, while Valeria battles her own insecurities.

Despite the misunderstandings, temptations, and emotional turmoil, Valeria and Sebastián ultimately realize that their love is strong enough to overcome the challenges. In the end, they find their way back to each other and move forward toward happiness together.

== Cast ==
- Zuria Vega as Valeria
- Alberto Guerra as Sebastián
- Macarena Achaga as Pamela
- Ignacia Allamand as Sandra
- José Alonso as Miguel
- Regina Blandón as Ale
- Diana Bracho as Elena
- Fernanda Castillo as Theatre actress
- Christian Chávez as Alberto
- Pablo Cruz as Erik
- Erik Hayser as Roy
- Ariel Levy as Alonso
- Natalia Téllez as Carolina
