= Zuria Vega =

Mexican actress

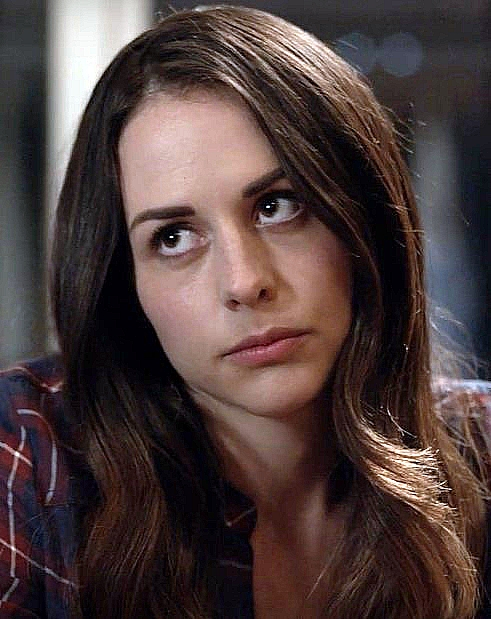
- Vega in 2019
- Born: Zuria Valeria Vega Sisto; January 10, 1989 (age 36); Mexico City, Mexico
- Occupations: Actress, singer
- Years active: 2007–present
- Spouse: Alberto Guerra (m. 2014)
- Children: 2
- Parent(s): Gonzalo Vega; Leonora Sisto
- Relatives: Marimar Vega (sister); Gonzalo Vega (brother); Gabriela Vega Tovar (half-sister)

Zuria Vega (Spanish pronunciation: [ˈsuɾja ˈβeɣa], born Zuria Valeria Vega Sisto; January 10, 1989) is a Mexican actress and singer.

== Early life ==
Vega was born and raised in Mexico City to Mexican actor Gonzalo Vega and a Spanish mother, Leonora Sisto. Her older sister is actress Marimar Vega and she has a brother. She has a half-sister from her father's previous relationship.

== Acting career ==
Vega started her acting career as an extra in the play La señora presidente, which her father also starred and directed. When she was 17 years old, she earned her first television acting role as "Roberta" in the Mexican drama series S.O.S.: Sexo y otros Secretos. In 2008 and 2009, she gained popularity in Mexico for her roles in the telenovelas Alma de hierro and Mar de amor, for which she starred as the lead. In 2010, she appeared in an episode of the third season of crime thriller series, Mujeres Asesinas 3.

In late 2013 and mid 2014, she starred in the successful comedy-drama telenovela, Qué pobres tan ricos alongside Jaime Camil. In November 2014, she was confirmed as the lead in the Televisa telenovela Que te perdone Dios. The telenovela is a remake of the popular 2000 Mexican telenovela Abrázame muy fuerte. Vega starred alongside Mexican actor Mark Tacher. Filming began on November 15, 2014, in San Miguel de Allende, Mexico and the program aired first on Univision, then Canal de las Estrellas in 2015. In 2017 she starred in the telenovela Mi Marido Tiene Familia opposite Daniel Arenas. Vega returned in the show's second season although only having small appearances after its mid run due to being pregnant.

== Personal life ==
Vega began dating Cuban actor Alberto Guerra in August 2013. The couple married at a ceremony in San Francisco, Nayarit, Mexico on November 22, 2014. On January 11, 2017, she gave birth to a girl named Lua. On May 20, 2019, she gave birth to a boy named Luka.

== Filmography ==
=== Film ===
Year	Title	Role	Notes
2010	Sin ella	Gabriela "Gaby" Sánchez	
2013	No sé si cortarme las venas o dejármelas largas	Julia	
2014	Más negro que la noche	Greta	
2014	Elvira, te daría mi vida pero la estoy usando	Ana	
2017	Casi una gran estafa	Elena	
2018	Inquilinos		
2019	En las buenas y en las malas	Valeria	
2020	¿Y cómo es él?	Marcia	
2023	Casando a mi ex	Mariana	

=== Television ===
Year	Title	Role	Notes
2007–2008	Sexo y otros secretos	Roberta	Series regular (season 1); 16 episodes
2008–2009	Alma de hierro	Renata Higareda Fontana	Series regular; 391 episodes
2010	Mujeres asesinas	Azucena	Episode: "Azucena, liberada"
2009–2010	Mar de amor	Estrella Marina Briceño	Main role; 165 episodes
2011	El Equipo	Magda Saenz	Main role; 15 episodes
2012	Cloroformo	Valerie	Main role; 13 episodes
2012	Un refugio para el amor	Luciana Jacinto	Main role; 165 episodes
2013–2014	Qué pobres tan ricos	María Guadalupe Menchaca Martínez	Main role; 167 episodes
2015	Que te perdone Dios	Abigail Ríos / Abigail Ramos Flores	Main role; 119 episodes
2016	Simplemente María	Jennifer	Episode: "Gran final"
2017	Las 13 esposas de Wilson Fernández	María Teresa	Episode: "María Teresa"
2017–2019	Mi marido tiene familia	Julieta Aguilar Rivera	Main role; 267 episodes
2018	Mi propósito eres tú	Julieta Aguilar Rivera	Television special
2021	La venganza de las Juanas	Juana Manuela Marroquín	Main role; 18 episodes
2022	El refugio	Paula	Main role; 6 episodes
2023	Las pelotaris 1926	Chelo	Main role; 4 episodes
2023	Las viudas de los jueves	Mariana Andrade	Main role
2024	¿Quién lo mató?	Brenda Bezares	Main role

== Stage ==
Year	Title	Role
2010	No sé si cortarme las venas o dejármelas largas	Julia
2011	Sin cura o adiós le dije	Bruna
2013	Cama para dos	Mariana

== Awards and nominations ==
Year	Award	Category	Nominee	Result
2009	TVyNovelas Awards	Best Female Revelation	Alma de hierro	Won
2013	TVyNovelas Awards	Los Favoritos del público: Favorite Couple with Gabriel Soto	Un refugio para el amor	Won
2013	TVyNovelas Awards	Best Lead Actress	Un refugio para el amor	Nominated
2009	Premios People en Español	Best Revelation of the Year	Alma de hierro	Nominated
2012	Premios People en Español	Best Revelation of the Year	Un refugio para el amor	Won
2009	Premios Bravo	Best Actress Revelation	Alma de hierro	Won
2011	Diosas de Plata	Best Actress Revelation	Sin ella	Won
2011	Premios de la Agrupación de Periodistas Teatrales (APT)	Revelation in Comedy	Sin cura o adios le dije	Won
2018	Premios TvyNovelas	Beat Lead Actress	Mi Marido Tiene Familla	Nominated
