= Alberto Guerra (actor) =

Cuban and Mexican actor (born 1982)

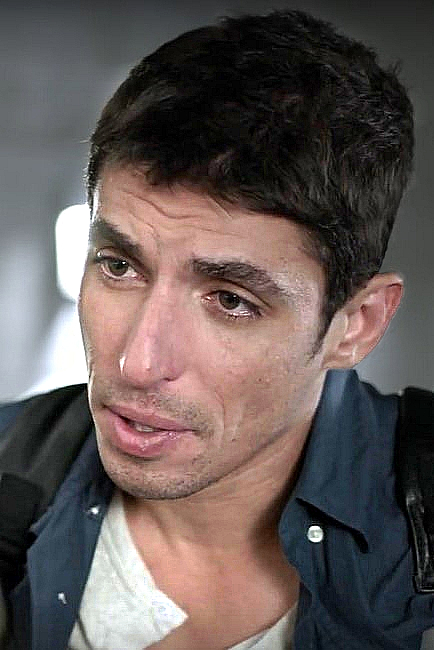
- Guerra in 2019
- Born: Alberto Óscar Guerra Ramos; 5 December 1982 (age 43); Havana, Cuba
- Citizenship: Cuba; Mexico
- Occupation: Actor
- Years active: 2002–present
- Spouse: Zuria Vega (m. 2014)
- Children: 3

Alberto Óscar Guerra Ramos (born December 5, 1982), known as Alberto Guerra, is a Cuban and Mexican actor. He started his acting career in Telemundo's Vale todo. He also starred in Crime Diaries: The Candidate (2019), Narcos: Mexico (2021) and Griselda (2024).

== Career ==
From 2018 to 2020, Guerra starred as El Chema in season 6 of El Señor de los Cielos, taking over the role previously played by Mauricio Ochmann.

In 2024, he played Darío Sepúlveda in the Netflix biographical crime miniseries Griselda, the bodyguard and partner of Griselda, played by Sofía Vergara.

== Personal life ==
Guerra began dating Mexican actress Zuria Vega in August 2013. The couple married in a ceremony in San Francisco, Nayarit, Mexico on November 22, 2014. On January 11, 2017, she gave birth to a girl named Lua. On May 20, 2019, the couple welcomed a baby boy named Luka.

== Filmography ==
=== Film ===
Year	Title	Role	Notes
2006	Cansada de besar sapos	Carlos	
2008	Arráncame la vida	Guillermo	
2009	La última y nos vamos	Alan	
2016	Sofía	J.C	Short film
2016	Tus feromonas me matan	Hector Víctor	
2017	El que busca encuentra	Manuel Aguado	
2018	Loca por el trabajo	Leonardo	
2019	En las buenas y en las malas	Sebastián	
2024	Pimpinero: Blood and Oil	Ulises	
2026	Ha-Chan, Shake Your Booty!	Fedir	
TBA	Porto Rico †		Filming

=== Television ===
Year	Title	Role	Notes
2002	Vale todo	Bruno	
2003	Ladrón de corazones	Tony Castillo	
2005	Los Plateados	Yasir Bashur	
2005	Decisiones	Unknown role	Episode: "Dos en una"
2007	El Pantera	Junior	Episode: "Call Girls"
2008	Secretos del alma	Armando	
2008	Vivir por ti	Francisco Marchena	
2008	Capadocia	Alberto	Episode: "Génesis"
2009	Pasión morena	Ramiro Negrete / El Diablo	
2011	Emperatriz	Mauricio Gómez	
2012	Amor cautivo	Ramiro Estrada	
2013	Corazón en condominio	Unknown role	
2013	La Isla, el reality	Alberto Guerra	Second place
2014	Siempre tuya Acapulco	David Balmaceda	
2015	Caminos de Guanajuato	Rómulo Coronel	
2016	Hasta que te conocí	Jesús Salas	3 episodes
2016	Un día cualquiera	Héctor	Episode: "Misoginia"
2017	Ingobernable	Canek Lagos	14 episodes
2017	Guerra de ídolos	Mateo Solar	Main role; 76 episodes
2018–2020	El Señor de los Cielos	El Chema	Main role (season 6); 31 episodes
2019	Crime Diaries: The Candidate	Comandante Federico Benítez	8 episodes
2021	Narcos: Mexico	Ismael "El Mayo" Zambada Garcia	Season 3
2024	Griselda	Darío Sepúlveda	
2024–present	The Accident	El Charro	

== Awards and nominations ==
Year	Award	Category	Works	Result	Ref.
2017	Your World Awards	Favorite Lead Actor	Guerra de ídolos	Nominated	
2017	Your World Awards	Soy Sexy and I Know It	Guerra de ídolos	Nominated	
