= El Chema (character) =

- El Señor de los Cielos character
- Mauricio Ochmann as El Chema
- Portrayed by: Mauricio Ochmann (2013–2017); Alberto Guerra (2018–present)
- Duration: 2013–present
- First appearance: "Dura Balacera" (2013)
- Created by: Luis Zelkowicz
- Spin-off appearances: El Chema (2016–2017)
- Alberto Guerra as El Chema (2018)

José María Venegas better known as El Chema is a fictional character on the Telemundo television series El Señor de los Cielos, created by Luis Zelkowicz. The role was portrayed by Mauricio Ochmann from the last episode of the first season of the series in 2013 until the end of the third season in 2015. Ochmann resumed the character in 2016, in the spin-off that produced Telemundo entitled El Chema.

After the announcement that Ochmann made about that he would not play the character again, the actor Alberto Guerra took up the character for the sixth season of El Señor de los Cielos.

== Storylines ==
=== Original series (2013–2018) ===
==== Season 1 ====
In season one, El Chema appears during a business that El Cabo and El Tijeras were doing with El Topo Galván.

==== Season 2 ====
José María Venegas was born in Arizona, in a small shack while his parents were trying to cross the border. Son of an American mother and a Mexican father, not only grew marked by the influence of the two cultures, but also by the paranoia and the cunning of those who pass it crossing from one side to the other of the most watched border in the world. Over time, the legend of "Chema" was growing in a meteoric way to associate with the capos of distribution in the United States, particularly with Randy and his American white-collar cartel of lawyers and financiers, for which he operated.
