= Fernando Noriega =

Mexican actor and television actor

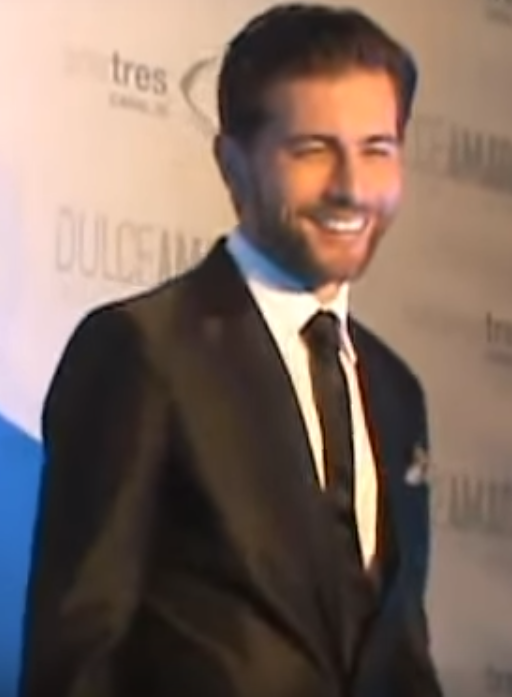
- Fernando Noriega in 2013
- Born: June 18, 1979 (age 46); León Guanajuato, Mexico
- Occupation: Actor
- Years active: 2001-present
- Notable work: El Chema

Fernando Noriega (born June 18, 1979) is a Mexican television actor.

== Filmography ==
Film roles
Year	Title	Roles	Notes
2006	Efectos secundarios	Totopo 18 Years Old	
2008	Más allá de mí	Más allá de mí	
2008	Enemigos íntimos	Man in the Beach	
2011	Where the Road Meets the Sun	Julio	
2013	Nothing Against Life	Felipe	

Television roles
Year	Title	Roles	Notes
2001	Lo que callamos las mujeres	Unknown role	Episode: "Entre el silencio y la lealtad"
2004	Soñarás	Jesús	
2004	La heredera	Alan	
2005	La vida es una canción	Unknown role	Episode: "Piel de niña"
2005	Top Models	Martín Oliver del Río	
2005	Machos	Antonio Mercader	
2005	Ni una vez más	Julián	
2005	Amor en custodia	Ramiro	
2007	Se busca un hombre	Ariel	
2008	La doble vida	Tomás	
2009	Glam Girls	Santiago Lombardi	10 episodes
2010–2011	Morir en Martes	Eugenio Mayer / Detective Mayer	
2012–2013	Dulce amargo	Diego Piquer	Main role; 119 episodes
2015–2016	Bajo el mismo cielo	Willy López	Recurring role; 77 episodes
2016–2017	El Chema	Eutimio "Rojo" Flores	Recurring role; 80 episodes
2017–2019	El Señor de los Cielos	Eutimio "Rojo" Flores	Archive footage (season 5, episode 89), Recurring role (season 6)
2021	¿Qué le pasa a mi familia?	Mariano Rueda Torres	Main cast

== Nominations ==
Year	Nomination	Telenovela	Result
2013	Premios Inter (Best Villain or Villain of the year)	Bittersweet	Nom
