= Lisa Owen =

Mexican actress and writer (born 1965)

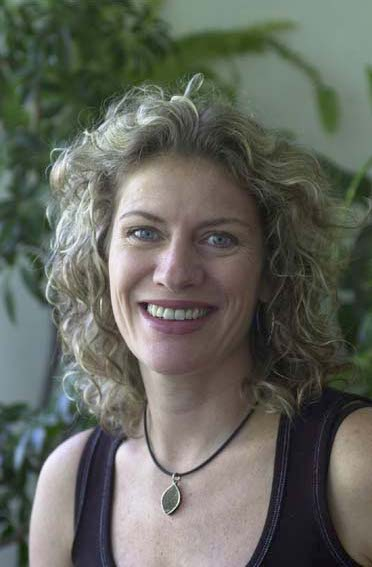
- Born: Lisa Dian Owen Wyckoff; July 8, 1965 (age 60); Mexico City, Distrito Federal, Mexico
- Occupations: Actress, writer
- Years active: 1985–present
- Television: Capadocia; El Señor de los Cielos

Lisa Dian Owen Wyckoff (born 8 July 1965), known professionally as Lisa Owen, is a Mexican actress and writer. She is best known for her role as Doña Alba in the hit Telemundo telenovela El Señor de los Cielos.

== Filmography ==
=== Films ===
Year	Title	Role	Notes
1990	Morir en el golfo	Miss Williams	Voice only
1990	Nadie es inocente	María	Short film
1991	Reportaje gráfico		
1991	Intimidad		
1992	La pareja ideal		Short film
1993	Un arreglo civilizado para el divorcio	Igrid	Short film
1994	Minges Alley	Receptionist	
1994	Amorosos fantasmas	Elisa Belascoaran	
1994	Días de combate	Elisa	
1994	Una buena forma de morir		
1995	Ponchada	Woman	Short film
1995	Desiertos mares	Elena	
1995	Algunas nubes	Elisa Belascoaran Shayne	
1995	Magnicídio		
1996	El amor de tu vida S.A.	Recepcionist	
1997	El asesinato	Mónica	
1998	Crisis	Mónica	
2000	Pilgrim	Heidi	
2001	Pachito Rex, me voy pero no del todo		
2001	El segundo aire	Julia	
2001	Pecado Original	Margareta	
2003	El misterio del Trinidad	Regina	
2006	Súper Nacho	Nacho's Mother	
2007	Cuatro vidas	Nurse No. 2	
2008	En el punto de mira	American Woman	
2008	High School Musical: El Desafío	Luli and Fer's mother	
2008	Divina confusión	Hera	
2009	El Traspatio	Silvia	
2009	La última y nos vamos	Rodrigo's mother	
2010	A través del silencio	Sonia	
2010	Chicogrande	Janice	
2011	Viento en contra	Lydia Resendis	
2013	Los insólitos peces gato	Martha	
2015	Eisenstein in Guanajuato	Mary Sinclair	
2018	The Mongolian Conspiracy	Annabella Crawford	
2020	New Order	Rebeca	

=== Television ===
Year	Title	Role	Notes
1985	Tiempo de Filmoteca	Host	
1997	Demasiado corazón		
1998	Tres veces Sofía	Mercedes Montemayor	
2003	Ladrón de corazones	Magdalena Tapia "Nenena"	
2010–2011	Capadocia	Adriana Ponce	
2010	Persons Unknown		"Seven Sacrifices" (Season 1, Episode 11)
2011	Bienvenida Realidad	Cristina Garza	
2013–2023	El Señor de los Cielos	Doña Alba Casillas	
2016	Juana Inés	Virreina Leonor Carreto de Toledo	
2021–2022	Parientes a la fuerza	Margarita Hernández de Jurado	
2023	Más allá de ti		

== Awards and nominations ==
Year	Awards	Category	Recipient	Outcome
2015	2015 Premios Tu Mundo	First Actress	El Señor de los Cielos	Won
