= List of El Señor de los Cielos cast members =

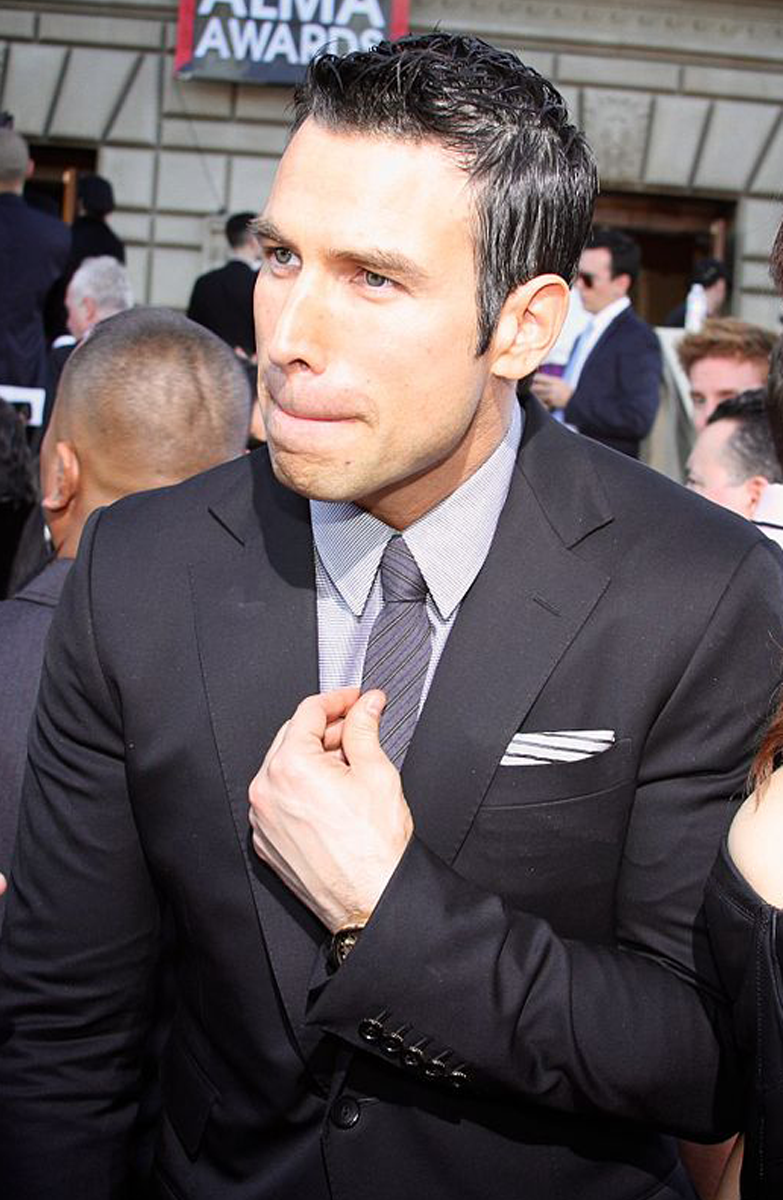
Rafael Amaya

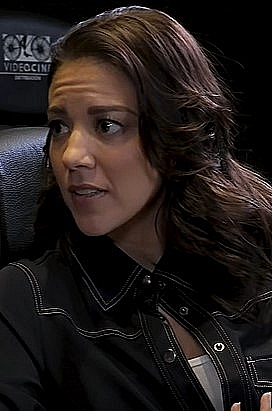
Fernanda Castillo

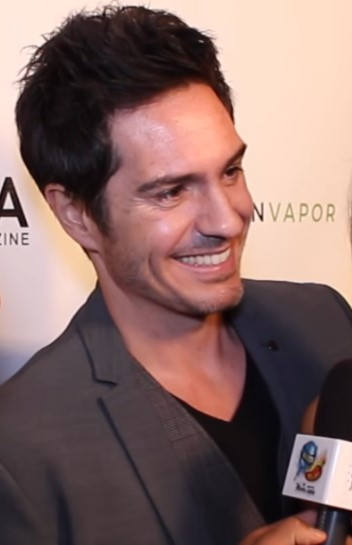
Mauricio Ochmann

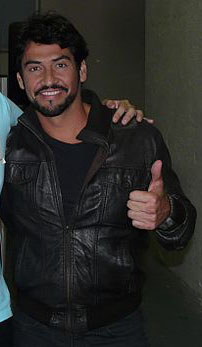
Gabriel Porras

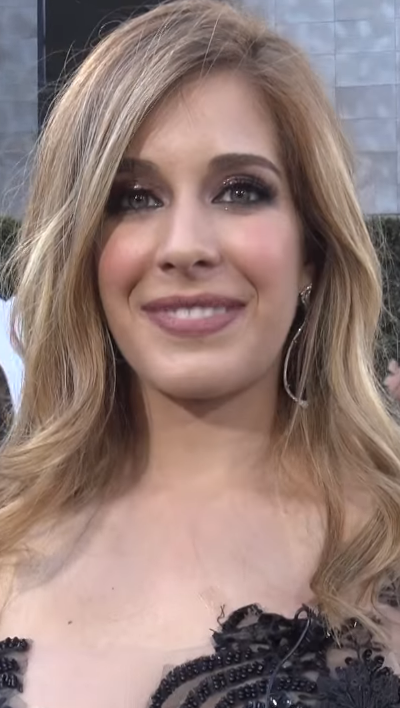
Carmen Aub

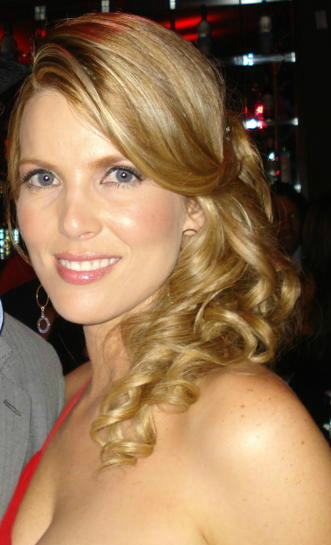
Maritza Rodríguez

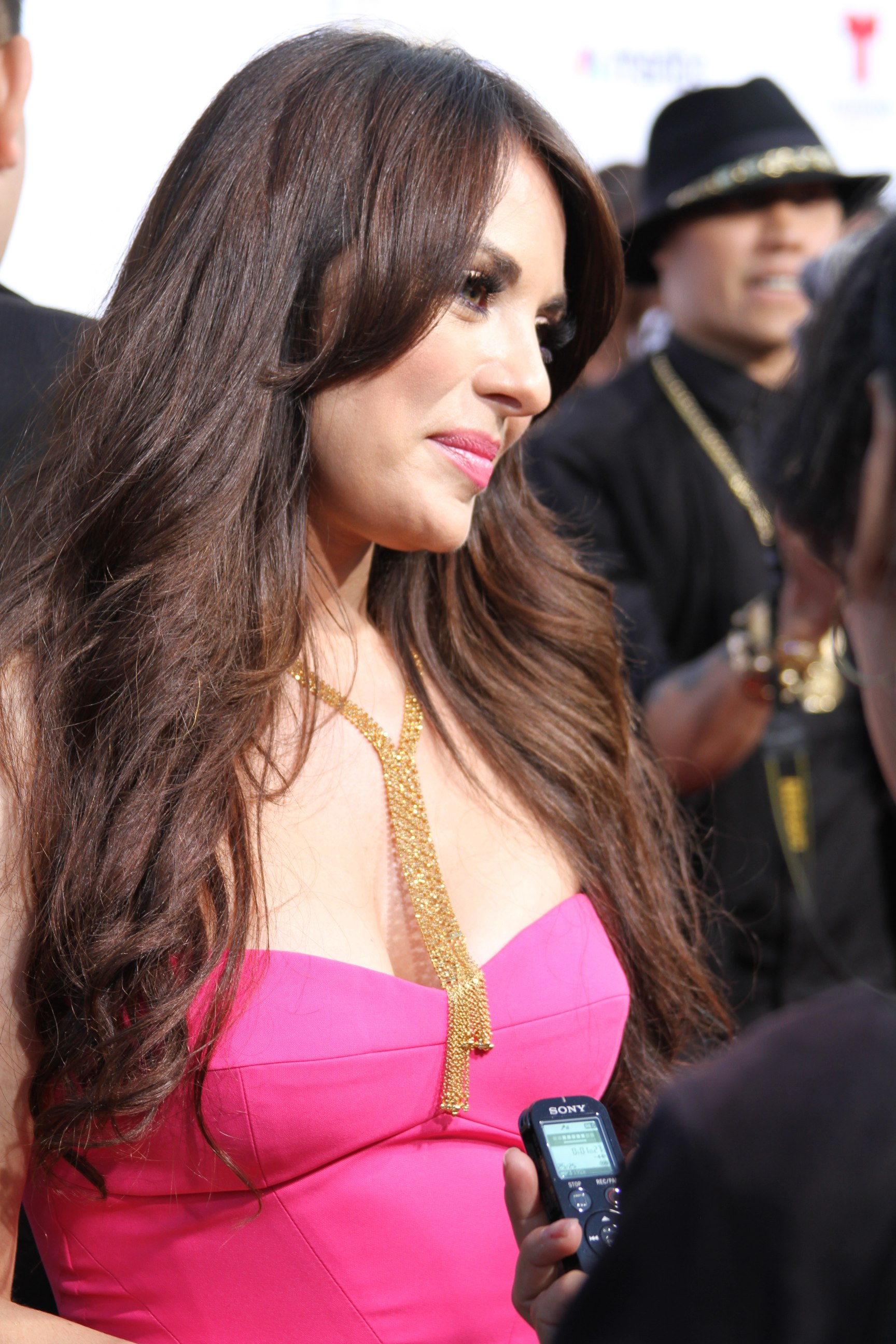
Vanessa Villela

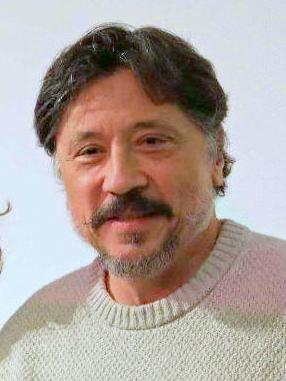
Carlos Bardem

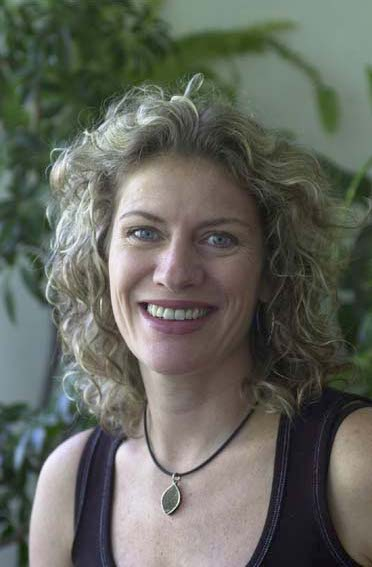
Lisa Owen

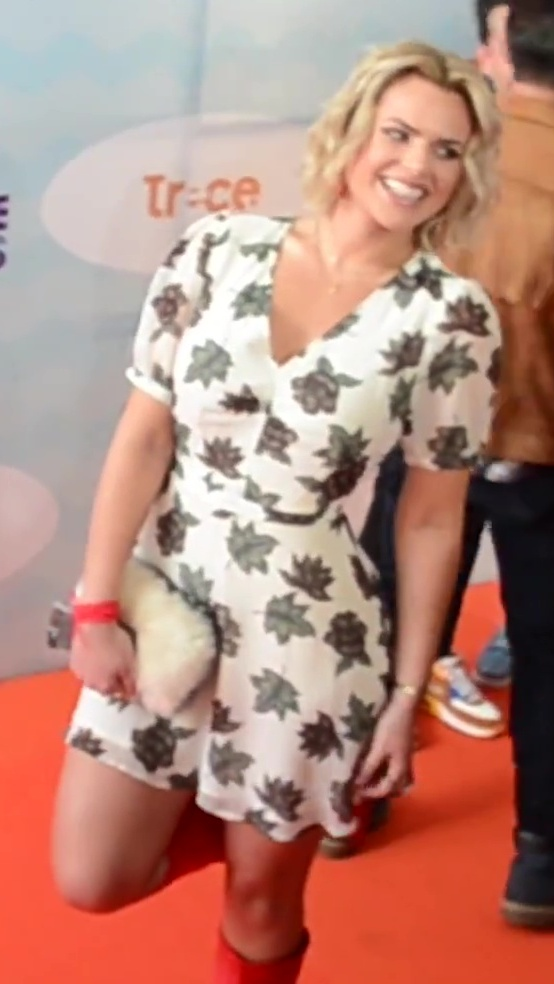
Isabella Castillo

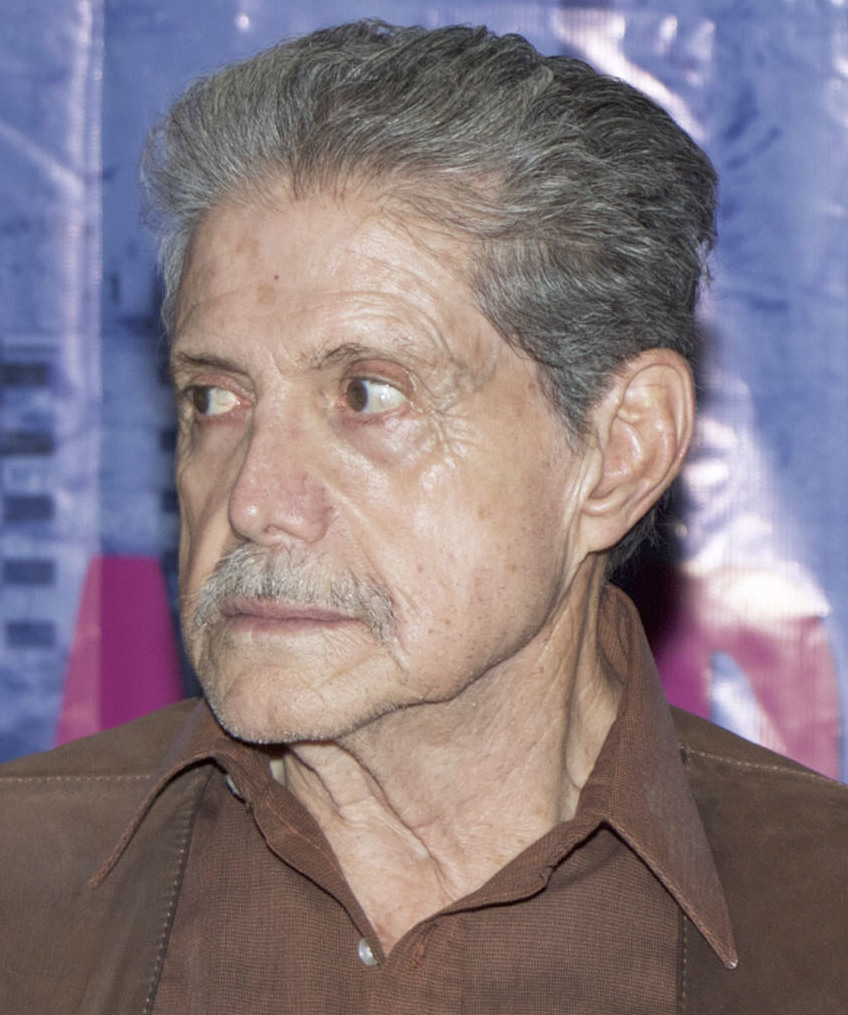
Héctor Bonilla

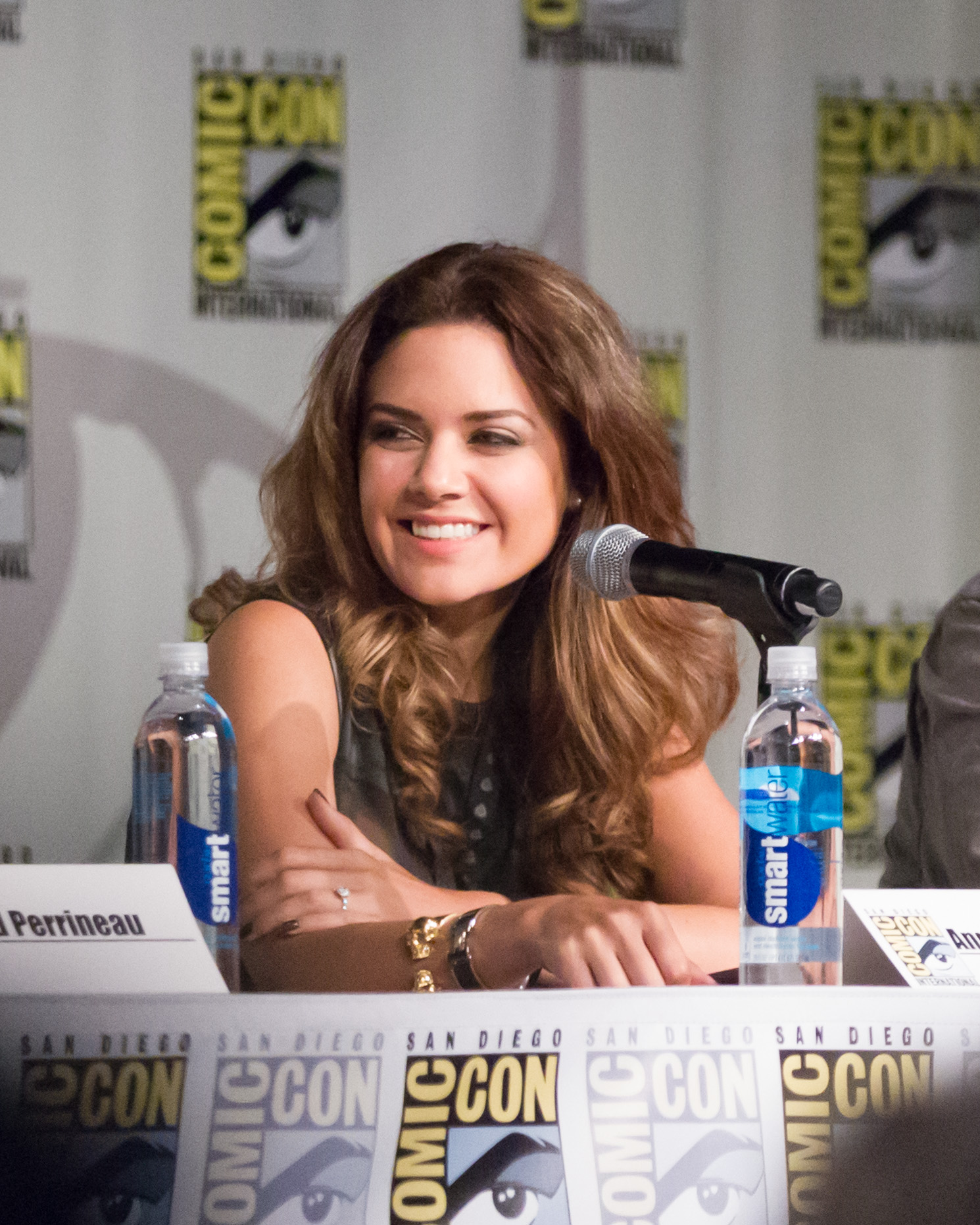
Angélica Celaya

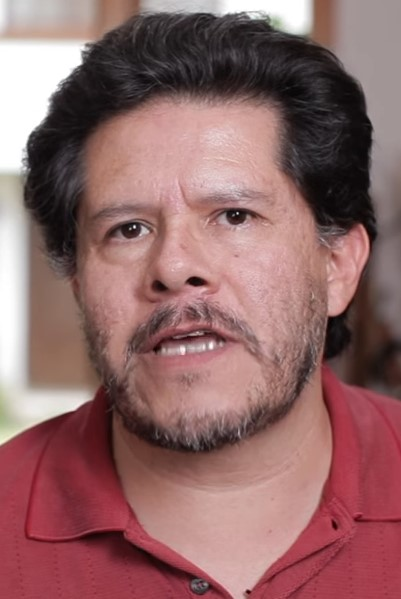
Jorge Zárate

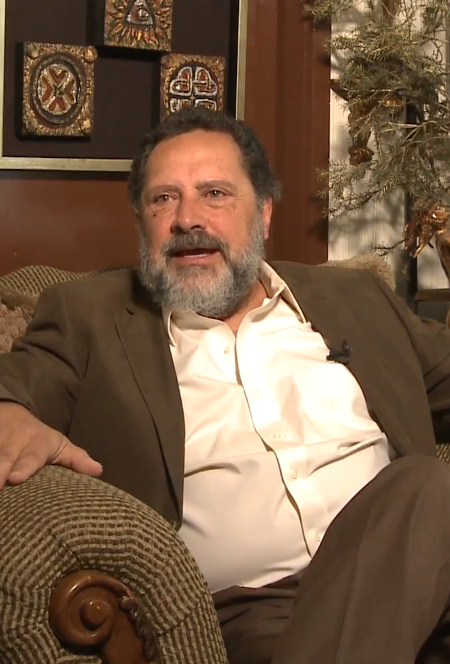
Javier Díaz Dueñas

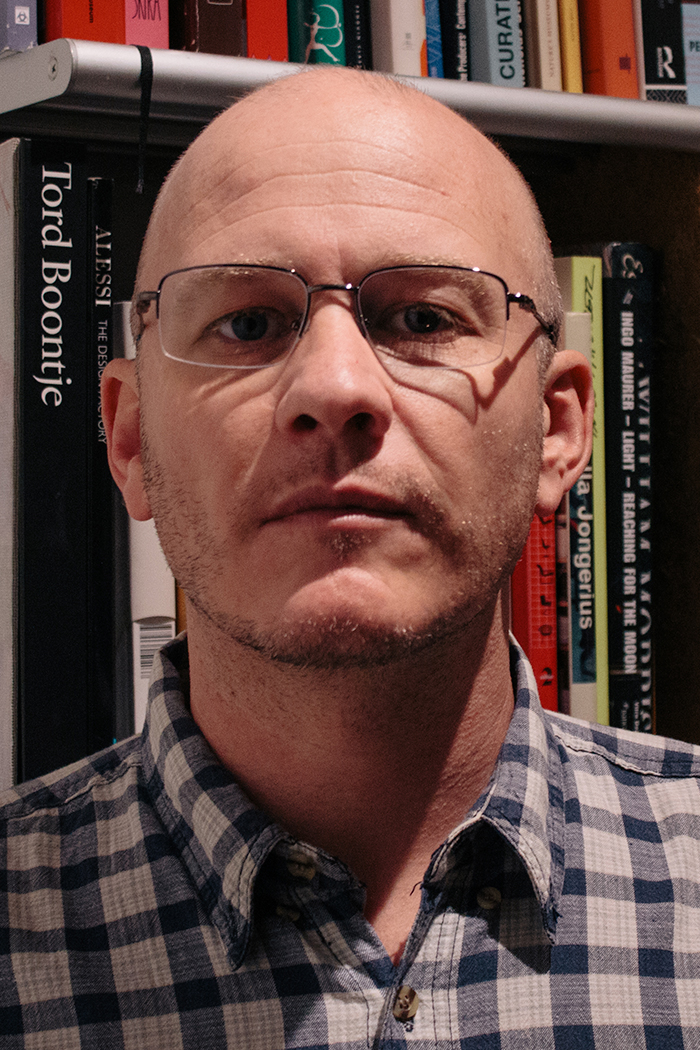
Ari Brickman

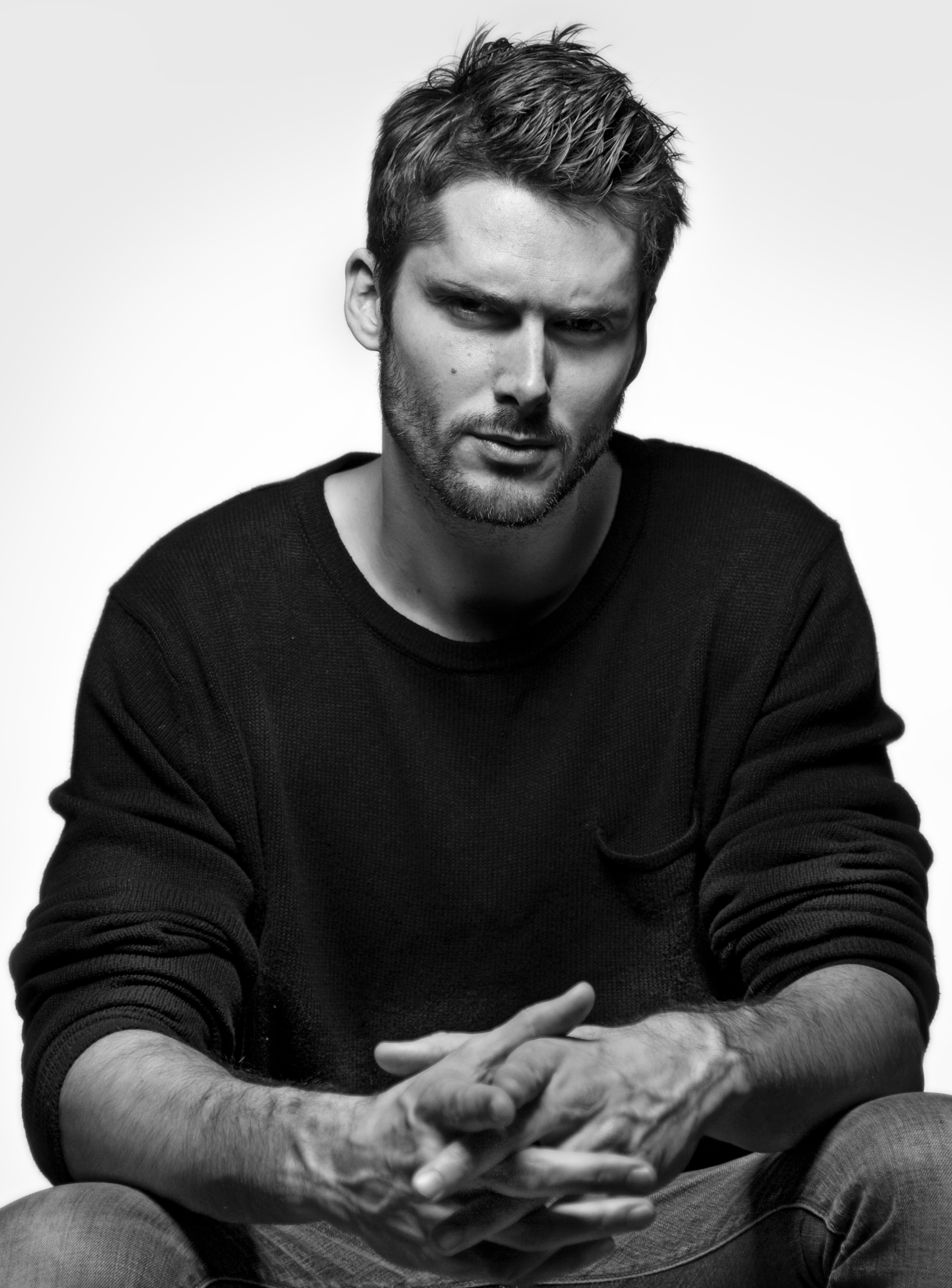
Sergio Mur

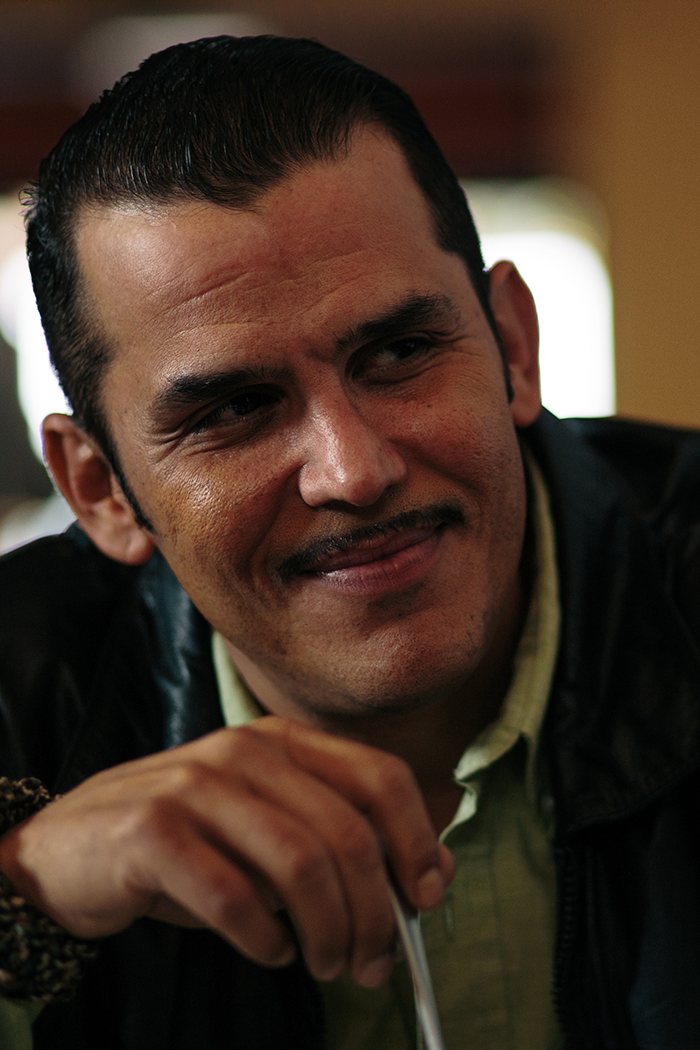
Néstor Rodulfo

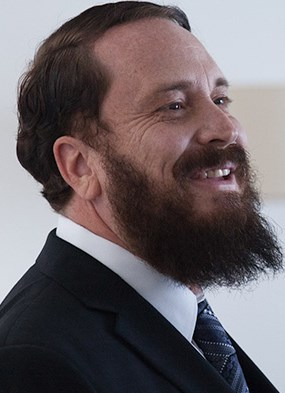
Christian Tappan

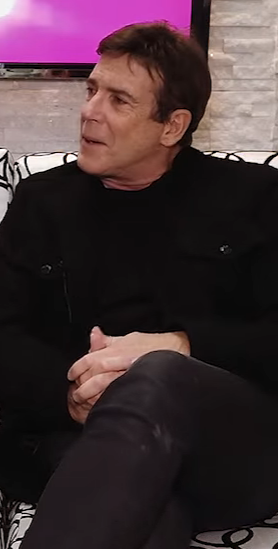
Carlos Mata

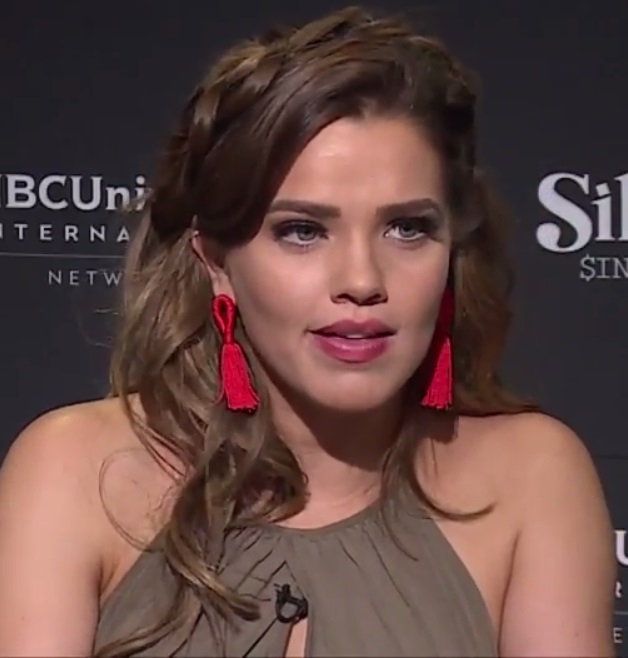
Thali García

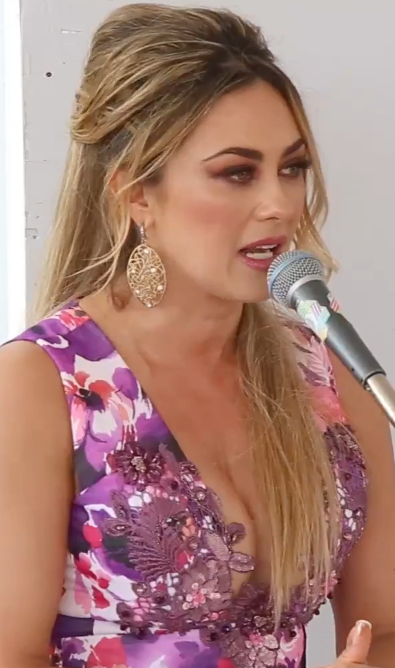
Aracely Arámbula

Main and recurring cast during all season of the series.

The following is a list of actors, and the characters they played, who appeared in the Telemundo series El Señor de los Cielos.

== Main characters ==
- Rafael Amaya as Aurelio Casillas (seasons 1–10; guest season 7): the main protagonist of the series, Head of the Casillas Cartel, and the patriarch of the Casillas family. Great-grandson of Teodoro Valenzuela.
- Ximena Herrera as Ximena Letrán (seasons 1–2): Aurelio's wife, and Rutila, Luzma and Heriberto's mother. Don Cleto's daughter.
- Robinson Díaz as Miltón Jiménez / Pío José Valdivia "El Cabo" (season 1, 6-7, 9; recurring season 2 and 8; special guest stars season 5 and 10): is the main distributor of drugs in Colombia, former partner of El Tijeras, Don Oscar's second-in-command and right-hand man. Leader of the North Valley Cartel after Don Oscar and Head of Rastrojos Cartel, and the main enemy of Aurelio. In season 7 after escaping from the authorities, he changes his name to Pío José Valdivia. Associate of the Caborca Cartel.
- Raúl Méndez as Víctor Casillas "Chacorta" (seasons 1–2): Aurelio's brother, father of Victor and Carlos, Aurelio's second-in-command and right-hand man. One of the leaders of the Casillas Cartel.
- Gabriel Porras as Marco Cartagena Mejía (season 1): Police Officer obsessed with capturing Aurelio Casillas for the death of his father DEA Agent Eduardo Cartagena. Commander of Federal Police and National Anti-Drug Commissioner.
- Carmen Villalobos as Leonor Ballesteros Mirelys (seasons 1–3): Colombian infiltrated agent and the female protagonist of the series during seasons 2–3. Later Omar's wife.
- Mauricio Ochmann as José María Venegas Mendivíl "El Chema" (seasons 2–3; special guest stars season 1): Former enforcer of the Sonora Cartel. Founding Member and Head of the Venegas cartel, Leonardo and El Chemita's father, El Rojo's adoptive brother, Rutila's lover, Aurelio's ally and rival, Fabricio Ponce's enemy, Ricardo Almenar's enemy.
  - Alberto Guerra as José María Venegas Mendivíl "El Chema" (season 6; recurring season 7)
- Fernanda Castillo as Mónica Robles Urdieta (seasons 2–5; recurring season 1; she also made guest appearance in El Chema) Isidro and Guadalupe's sister. Last leader of the Robles Cartel. Isidro's mother. Aurelio's lover, ally and rival.
- Marlene Favela as Victoria Navárez "La Gober" (season 2), Daughter of Governor Pedro Navárez and later Governor of Jalisco.
- Carmen Aub as Rutila Casillas Letrán (seasons 3–10; recurring season 2; she also made guest appearance in El Chema), Heriberto's and Luzma's sister. Ismael, Niky and Nazareno's half-sister. Daughter of Aurelio and Ximena. Don Cleto's grand-daughter. El Chemita/Humberto's mother. Former leader of the Letrán Cartel after Don Cleto then becoming one of the leaders of the Casillas Cartel. Former associate of the Venegas Cartel and Robles Cartel.
  - Terina Angell as Child Rutila (season 1)
  - Ana Sofía Durán as Child Rutila (season 2)
- Maritza Rodríguez as Amparo Rojas (seasons 3–4): Matilde's late sister and Aunt of Carlos.
- Sabrina Seara as Esperanza Salvatierra Cortini (seasons 4–5, recurring season 3), Aurelio's Ex-lover. Former associate of Casillas Cartel.
- Vanessa Villela as Emiliana Contreras Cortenas (seasons 4–5; she also made guest appearance in El Chema):, Lencho's daughter.
- Marisela González as Eunice Lara "La Felina" (seasons 5-10, recurring season 4; Main role in Season 2 of La Doña): El Super Javi and La Doña's parther. Don Feyo, El Oficial and El Duro's lover. Associate of the Knights Templar Cartel, Casillas Cartel and Sandoval's Construction Company.
- Mariana Seoane as María Isabel "Mabel" Castaño / Ninón del Valle (season 5; reprising her role from El Chema). El Chema's former lover, Gary's Widow. Leonardo's Mother. Aurelio's lover after Pilar. Mónica and Felina's rival and enemy.
- Miguel Varoni as Leandro Quezada (season 5–6; reprising his role from Dueños del paraíso): Head of the Santa Norma Cartel.
- Guy Ecker as Joe Navarro (season 6–7): US National Anti-Drug Commissioner and the DEA station chief in México after Colon.
- Ninel Conde as María de los Ángeles "Evelina" López (season 6–7): El Rayo's missing daughter. El Cabo and Joaquín's lover.
- Carlos Bardem as Leonidas "El Chivo" Ahumada (season 6), Former Candidate of the Governor of Coahuila. Diana and Berenice's father.
- Alejandro López Silva as El Súper Javi (season 6-8; recurring seasons 3–5, 7; he also made guest appearance in El Chema): Commander of the FARC and later Casillas Cartel. Rutila's lover.
- Jesús Moré as Omar Terán Robles (season 6; recurring seasons 3–5; he also made guest appearance in El Chema): Corrupted politician. Leonor's husband. Former Ministry of Health and 64th President of México after Morejon. Relative of the Robles Family. Affiliate of the Robles Cartel, Casillas Cartel and Rastrojos Cartel.
- Lisa Owen as Doña Alba Casillas (season 6; recurring seasons 1–3, 5, 7, guest season 8): Don Humberto's widow. Aurelio's and Chacorta's mother. Granddaughter Teodoro Valenzuela.
- Isabella Castillo as Diana Ahumada (seasons 6–10): Esther and El Chivo's daughter, Berenice's older sister and Amado's girlfriend. High-ranking member of the Casillas Cartel.
- Matías Novoa as Amado Casillas Leal "El Águila Azul" (season 6–7): Aurelio's half-brother, and Diana's boyfriend, former agent of the CIA becoming one of the leaders of the Casillas Cartel.
- Iván Arana as Ismael Casillas Guerra (seasons 6–9; recurring seasons 4–5; he also made guest appearance in El Chema): The missing son of Aurelio, Aurelio's right hand man and second-in-command of the Casillas Cartel from seasons 5-8. One of the leaders of the Casillas Cartel.
- Fernando Noriega as Eutimio "Rojo" Flores (season 6; recurring seasons 5, 7; reprising his role from El Chema): El Chema's Former right hand and second-in-command of the Venegas Cartel. Super Javi's ally. Founding member and former leader of the Venegas Cartel and later high-ranking member of the Casillas Cartel.
- Eduardo Santamarina as Balthazar Ojeda (season 7; recurring season 6): Former Agent of the CIA, High-ranking Member and Double Agent of the Balcanes Cartel and Rastrojos Cartel, Renzo Volpi's associate and brief right hand man, El cabo new ally/partner and second-in-command, and amado's arch-enemy.
- Danna García as Violeta Estrella (season 7): Joaquín's Wife
- Rubén Cortada as Fernando Aguirre (season 8): Corrupt businessman and serial killer, Don Julio's right man and second-in-command. Leader of the Caborca Cartel after Don Julio.
- África Zavala as Mercedes "Mecha" de la Cruz (seasons 8–9): Another one of the Aurelio's lovers.
- Yuri Vargas as Tracy Lobo (season 8): Corrupted infiltrated DEA agent obsessed with capturing Aurelio Casillas, main person responsible for the desecration of the tomb and resurrection of Aurelio Casillas alongside boss Manzano, she is an expert in torturing criminals and infiltrations, planning to run all agency operations in Mexico. Salma/Corina's rival and arch-enemy.
- Itatí Cantoral as Belén San Román / Blanca Lovato (season 9; reprising her role from El Chema)
- Julio Bracho as Ricardo Almenar (season 9; reprising his role from El Chema)
- Jason Romo as Diego Bustamante (season 9)

== Recurring characters ==
=== Introduced in season 1 ===
- Andrés Parra as Pablo Escobar (repirsing his role from Pablo Escobar, The Drug Lord): Colombian drug trafficker and head of the Medellín Cartel.
- Sara Corrales as Matilde Rojas (seasons 1–2): Chacorta's wife. Amparo's deceased sister and mother of Carlitos.
- Fernando Solórzano as Don Óscar Cadena (repirsing his role from El cartel and also portrayed the role in El Chema): Colombian drug trafficker and head of the North Valley Cartel. El Tostado's former rival. Associate of the Venegas Cartel, Casillas Cartel and later Galván Cartel.
- Arturo Barba as Alí Benjuema "El Turco" (seasons 1–2): Aurelio's legal adviser. Ximena's lover. Affiliate of the Casillas Cartel, Galván Cartel and later Venegas Cartel.
- Sophie Gómez as Irina Vorodin (seasons 1–2): El Turco's partner. Affiliate of the Casillas Cartel and North Valley Cartel.
- Juan Ríos Cantú as General Daniel Jiménez Arroyo "El Letrudo" (he also made guest appearances in El Chema): Corrupt Militar, Aurelio and Chacorta's accomplice and parther. Fabricio Ponce and Marco Mejia's boss government colleagues. Affiliate of the Casillas Cartel.
- Angélica Celaya as Eugenia Casas: Journalist. Marco's girlfriend.
- Guillermo Quintanilla as Isidro Robles Urdieta (he also portrayed the role in El Chema): Mónica and Guadalupe's brother. Eldest of the Robles Family and Head of the Robles Cartel.
- Marco Pérez as Guadalupe Robles Urdieta (he also made guest appearances in El Chema): Mónica and Isidro's brother, second-in-command of the Robles cartel. One of the leaders of the Robles Cartel, Aurelio's enemy.
- Rocío Verdejo as Doris de Jiménez: El Letrudo's wife.
- Tommy Vásquez as Álvaro José Pérez "Tijeras" (seasons 1–4): El Cabo's partner and right hand man. second-in-command of the North Valley Cartel, Becoming one of the leaders of the North Valley Cartel after Don Oscar and later Envigado/Rastrojos cartel.
- Fabián Peña as Jesús Linares: Eugenia's friend.
- Emmanuel Orenday as Gregorio Ponte Hernández (seasons 1–2): Marco and Leonor's partner in the Federal Police.
- Ruy Senderos as Heriberto Casillas Letrán (seasons 1–2): Aurelio's Eldest son, third-in-command of the Casillas Cartel. High-ranking member of the Letrán Cartel and Casillas Cartel.
- Bianca Calderón as Roxana Mondragón (she also made guest appearances in El Chema): Isidro's girlfriend. Guadalupe's lover.
- Ángel Cerlo as General Castro: a corrupt politician. Affiliate of the Casillas Cartel
- Arnoldo Picazzo as Flavio Huerta: a corrupt politician. Affiliate of the Robles Cartel and Casillas Cartel.
- Juan Ignacio Aranda as Ramiro Silva de la Garza (seasons 1, 3–4; he also portrayed the role in El Chema): a corrupt politician. Ricardo Almenar and Tobias Clark's adviser. Aurelio's associate. Omar Teran's Mentor. Living in Dublin. Affiliate of the Sonora Cartel and Casillas Cartel.
- Jorge Zárate as Juan Montoya: Mexican drug trafficker from Tamaulipas. Leader of the Villalobos cartel.
- Javier Díaz Dueñas as Don Anacleto "Cleto" Letrán (he also made guest appearance in El Chema): Ximena's father, Drug Lord From Sinaloa and Aurelio's father-in Law. Aurelio and Chacorta's former mentor. Head of the Letrán Cartel.
- Manuela González as Lorelay "Lay" Cadena (seasons 1–2): Matilde's partner. Aurelio's ex-lover. Don Oscar's late sister.
- Fernando Banda as Agustín Chon "El Vitaminas" (season 1–present): Aurelio's bodyguard and right hand man. Enforcer of the Casillas Cartel.
- Carlos Gallardo as Patólogo (season 1) / Carlos José Zuleta (season 5–6): Chief of Estado Mayor Presidencial and El Cabo's adviser. Enforcer of the Rastrojos Cartel.
- Rodrigo Abed as César Silva de la Gárza (he also made guest appearances in El Chema): the 60th President of México.
- Roberto Uscanga as Arturo Benitez: Former Ministry of the Interior later becomes 61st President of Mexico after Cesar Silva.
- Iñaki Goci as El Triste (he also portrayed the role in El Chema): Chief of Security for the Robles Cartel, Isidro's bodyguard and right man of the Robles Cartel. Enforcer of the Robles Cartel.

=== Introduced in season 2 ===
- Erika de la Rosa as Elsa Marín: Corrupt Politician. She is National Attorney and later The Mayor of Guadalajara. El Chema's parther. Defeated candidate for Governor of Jalisco. Affiliate of the Venegas Cartel.
- Ari Brickman as Jeremy Andrews (seasons 2–3; he also portrayed the role in El Chema): high ranking DEA Agent and later station chief in México after Jones. El Chema's adviser. Double Agent and Enforcer of the Venegas Cartel.
- Carlos Torrestorija as Maximiliano "Max" Miravalle: Ignacio's father. Elsa's lover.
- Tomás Goros as General Antonio Garnica (seasons 2–4): Former Head of the anti-drug Division. Corrupt General enemy of Aurelio. General of the Emes.
- Surya MacGregor as Cecilia: Ignacio's mother.
- Antonio de la Vega as Santiago Echeverría: Ximena's lover. Protector of Sinaloa. Guanajuato's Businessman.
- Miguel Melo as Young Víctor Casillas Rámos "Victor Jr": Chacorta's young son. Aida's late son.
- Sahit Sosa as Ernesto Gamboa Sánchez (seasons 2–3): Rutila's ex-boyfriend. Former enforcer of the Casillas Cartel and Venegas Cartel.
- Juan Luis Orendain as Father Lázaro Sánchez: Father of the community.
- Ausencio Cruz as José Antonio Gutiérrez Velarde "Pepe Johnson",:actor partner of Chacorta.
- Toño Muñiz as Coronel Marcelino Ramos: A former militar becomes Leonor's partner in the Federal Police.
- Irineo Álvarez as Pedro Navárez: Victoria's father. Deceased Governor of Jalisco.
- Manuel Balbi as Rodrigo Rivero Lanz (seasons 2–5): Head of the anti-drug Division after Garnica. Former Ministry of Public Security before and after Ignacio. Leonor's partner in the Federal Police. Rutila and Evelyn's lover.
- Flavio Peniche as Mario Quintero "El Bigotes": El chema's temporary right hand and bodyguard after El Rojo. Sicario and Enforcer of the Venegas Cartel.
- Karla Sofía Gascón as Iñaki Izarrieta: Lorelay's boyfriend.
- Sandra Díaz as Irma Veracierta (seasons 2–3): Chacorta's wife.
- Sebastián Caicedo (he also portrayed the role in El Chema)
  - as Gustavo "El Tostado" Yepes (season 2): Eleazar's twin brother. Head of the Clan Yepes. Associate of the Sonora Cartel and later Venegas Cartel. Don Oscar's former rival.
  - as Eleazar Yepes (seasons 3–4): El Tostado's twin brother. Leader of the Clan Yepes after El Tostado. Associate of the Venegas Cartel, Knights Templar Cartel and Envigado Cartel.
- Edgardo González as Lilo Planas (seasons 2–3): Aurelio, El Super Javi and Victor Jr's partner. Associate of the Casillas Cartel.
- Alejandro de la Madrid as Ignacio Miravalle (seasons 2–4): Leonor's ex-husband. Ministry of Public Security after Rivero. General Garnica's right hand and second-in-command. High-ranking member of the Emes.
- Ofelia Guiza as Diana Quiñones (seasons 2–3), Ignacio's secretary.
- José Juan Meraz as Ramón (seasons 2–5): Mónica's right hand man and bodyguard after El Triste. Enforcer of the Robles Cartel.
- Daniel Rascón as El Toro (seasons 2–7; he also portrayed the role in El Chema): Former Nogales Butcher, El Chema's right hand man and bodyguard. Second in command of the Venegas Cartel. Enforcer of the Venegas Cartel and temporary enforcer of the Casillas Cartel.
- David Ponce as José Manrique "Skinny" (seasons 2–present): Leader of the MS-13, Víctor Casillas Jr right hand man later second in command of the Chacorta Cartel, Chacorta's former partner. Former enforcer of the Chacorta Cartel. Enforcer of the Casillas Cartel along with Chatarerro.
- Carlos Puente as Pompeyo (seasons 2–present; he also made guest appearances in El Chema): Rutila's bodyguard and right hand. Former high-ranking member of the Letrán Cartel and enforcer of the Casillas Cartel.
- Paloma Ruiz de Alda as Helga: Iñaki and Heriberto's lover.
- Alejandra Toussaint as Chabela: Victor's girlfriend and wife.
- Palmeira Cruz as Lucila Sosa: Ponte and Leonor's former parther in the Federal Police. Elsa's Personal assistant.
- Sebastian Dopazo as Danilo Ferro: Businessman kidnapped and impersonated by Aurelio to approach Victoria Nevárez.

=== Introduced in season 3 ===
- Sergio Mur as Tim Rawlings (seasons 3–4): high ranking CIA Agent and later the DEA station chief in México after Andrews. Officer accomplice of Aurelio. Affiliate of the Casillas Cartel.
- Gala Montes as Luz Marina "Luzma" Casillas Letrán (seasons 3–4): Aurelio and Ximena's daughter. Don Cleto's grand-daughter. Isturiz's lover.
  - Renata Manterola as Luz Marina "Luzma" Casillas Letrán (season 7–8)
- Leonardo Daniel as Don Alfredo "Feyo" Aguilera (seasons 3–4; he also portrayed the role in El Chema): Head of The Michoacán Family and Knights Templar Cartel. Partner of Don Ricardo, Aurelio, El Chema and later El Oficial. Associate of the Sonora Cartel, Venegas Cartel and later Envigado Cartel.
- Verónica Montes as Belén Guerrero "La Condesa": Feyo's wife, and Aurelio's lover.
- Jorge Luis Moreno as Víctor Casillas Rámos "Victor Jr / Chacortita" (seasons 3–5; he also made guest appearance in El Chema): Chacorta's adult son, Aida's late son. Aurelio's temporary second in command after Chacorta and Heriberto, Aurelio's former rival. Former leader of the Casillas Cartel and Head of the Chacorta Cartel.
  - Nando as Child Víctor (season 1)
  - Miguel Melo as Young Víctor (season 2)
- Carlos Torres as Enrique Morejón: 63rd President of México after Fons.
- Sandra Beltrán as Julia Reyes: Leonor's friend and Tim's wife.
- Viviana Serna as Cristina Salgado: Rutila's friend, and Víctor Jr's lover. Journalist and associate of the Robles Cartel.
- Cesar Izaguirre as Juan Martín Peña: Elisa's father.
- Bárbara Singer as Elisa Peña (seasons 3–4): Leonor's friend.
- Alejandro Usigli as Justino Guerrero: La Condesa's father.
- Sebastián Ferrat as Juan Antonio Marcado (seasons 3–4): a corrupt militar enemy of Aurelio. Commander and Head of the Emes, El chema's Former accomplice. Former Associate of the Venegas Cartel.
- Sebastian Urdiales as Carlos "Carlitos" Casillas Rojas: Chacorta's second son. Matilde's son.
  - Adrián Herrera as Carlos "Carlitos" Casillas Rojas (season 3, episode 89 to season 4, episode 23)
- Fernando Sarfatti as Valentín Fons: 62nd President of México after Benitéz.
- Néstor Rodulfo as General Camilo Jaramillo (seasons 3–4): Eleazar's partner in Colombia after Arcila. Affiliate of the Clan Yepes.
- Alejandro Félix as Chatarrero (seasons 3–present):El feyo's Former right hand man and bodyguard. Enforcer of the Michoacan Family/Knights Templar Cartel. Enforcer and Sicario of the Casillas Cartel.
- Ligia Petit as Gloria: Esperanza's friend.
- Marco Zetina as Dr. Ricardo Monteverde (seasons 3–4): doctor in charge of the health of Aurelio. Affiliate of the Casillas Cartel and Michoacan Family/Knights Templar Cartel.
- Arnulfo Reyes Sánchez as Benjamín "El Espanto": he is in charge of watching Aurelio, so he doesn't commit crimes.
- Alejandro Navarrete as El Zopilote (seasons 3–present): Victor Jr's and Ismael's bodyguard and right hand man, Chief of security For the Chacorta Cartel and Casillas cartel. Enforcer of the Casillas Cartel.
- Arturo Echeverria as Jack Melendez: Tim's CIA Boss in Chicago.
- Plutarco Haza as Dalvio Navarrete "El Ingeniero" (seasons 3–5, 7, 10): Lawyer and former police. He is a strong and ruthless man, who inherited control of all Chema Venegas businesses, Engineer who designs tunnels like el Chema. One of the leaders of the Knights Templar Cartel. Associate and ally of the Casillas Cartel.
- Gabriel Coronel as Armando Pérez Ricard (seasons 3–4): Venezuelan corrupt businessman associated with the Mexican government.
- Christian Tappan as Gustavo Gaviria "El Oficial" (seasons 3–4): enemy of Aurelio. and El Feyo's partner. Head of the Envigado Cartel. Associate of the Knights Templar Cartel.
- Roxana Chávez as Eva Ernestina Gallardo (seasons 3–4): Ramiro's parther.
- Iván Tamayo as Jorge Elías Salazar (seasons 3–5; he also made guest appearance in El Chema): Former Ambassador of Venezuela, DEA Agent.
- Marco Treviño as Abel Terán Fernández (seasons 3–4): Omar Terán's father.
- Juan Pablo Franco as Reyesito (seasons 3-4): El Oficial's right hand, bodyguard and second-in-command. Enforcer of the Envigado Cartel.
- Lorena del Castillo as Officer Evelyn García (seasons 3–5; she also made guest appearance in El Chema): Former Marine Officer and Rivero's lover.
- Franklin Virgüez as General Diosdado Carreño Arias (seasons 3–4): General of the Cartel of the Suns.
- Mauricio Garza as Fabricio Varón "El Chef": Drug Cook. Cristina's parther. Luzma's ex-lover. Chef of the Robles Cartel.
- Cristian Satin as El Roto (seasons 3–5): El ingeniero's bodyguard and right hand man. Enforcer of the Knights Templar Cartel.
- Marina de Tavira as Begoña Barraza (seasons 3–6): Former First Lady of México.
- Citlali Galindo as Mayra Rodríguez (seasons 3–6; she also made guest appearance in El Chema): President Omar Teran's Private Secretary.
- Emilio Chabre as Humberto Venegas Casillas "El Chemita" (season 3-present; he also made guest appearance in El Chema): El Chema and Rutila's son. Leonardo's half-brother.
- Daniela Zavala as Arelis Mendoza (season 3–6): El Greñas' lover, the Ambassador of Venezuela's personal assistant. Affiliate of the Casillas Cartel.

=== Introduced in season 4 ===
- Wendy de los Cobos as Aguasanta "Tata" Guerra (seasons 4–5, 7-present; he also made guest appearance in El Chema): Ismael's mother.
- Geraldine Zinat as Amalia Ramírez: Nazareno's mother.
- Diego de Tovar as Nicandro "Niki" Casillas Limón: Connie's son. Aurelio's biological son.
- Ivonne Montero as Consuelo "Connie" Limón: Nicandro's mother, and Aurelio's lover.
- Carlos Fonseca as Nazareno Casillas Ramírez: Aurelio's biological son, Carmen's husband. Father of the Two Children.
- Ofelia Medina as Lourdes Cortenas (seasons 4–5): Emiliana's Mother. Lencho's Widow.
- Gabriel Bonilla as Isidro Casillas Robles (season 4–9): Aurelio's and Mónica's son.

=== Introduced in season 5 ===
- Patricia Vico as Pilar Ortiz: La Felina's friend and parther. Aurelio's lover. Associate of the Casillas Cartel.
- Carlos Mata as Juan Carlos Salvatierra: Esperanza's father.
- Daniel Martínez as Guillermo Colón (season 5–present) Former Mexican DEA commissioner.
- Juan Martín Jauregui as Sebastián Almagro: Rutila's lover.
- Ernesto Benjumea as Melquiades Soler "Penumbra": Commander of the Cartel of the Suns.
- Ricardo Leguizamo as Rafael Jiménez "Doble 30": Colombian drug lord. Associate of the Casillas Cartel and later Santa Norma Cartel.
- Catherina Cardozo as Giuseppina "Pina" Cortini: Esperanza's mother.
- Valeria Vera as Zoe: Esperanza's lesbian lover.
- Alan Slim as Jaime Ernesto Rosales (season 5–present): Corrupt Politician becoming Governor of Quintana Roo. Omar's friend. Affiliate of the Casillas Cartel and Rastrojos Cartel.
- Kristo Cifuentes as Arnulfo Sutamarchan
- Carlos Rios as Camilo "Vaso E' Leche"
- Emmanuel Esparza as Tony Pastrana: Spanish corrupt businessman, Crime boss. Head of the Chicago Cartel and Aurelio's enemy.
- Alex Walerstein as Paul "El Greñas" (season 5–present): Professional hacker of the Casillas Cartel. Dj Dylan's former enemy and rival.
- Juan Manuel Mendoza as Andrés Velandia
- Francisco Calvillo as Rubén Saba
- Leonardo Álvarez as Leonardo Venegas Castaño (season 5-present): El Chema's son. Mabel's son. El Chemita's brother.
- José Sedek as Bernardo Castillo (season 5–present): Former Ministry of Public Security and later DEA Agent.
- Polo Monarrez as Filemón: Leader of the Emes. Former Sicario and enforcer of the Chacorta Cartel. Tony Pastrana's bodyguard and right hand man. Enforcer of the Chicago Cartel.
- Paloma Jiménez as Paloma Villareal (season 5; reprising her role from El Chema): First Lady of México.
- Karla Carrillo as Corina Saldaña / Salma Vidal Fernández (season 5–8; reprising her role from El Chema): Sinaloa Police Officer, El Chema's ex-lover, Aurelio's lover, Amado's partner and former agent of the CIA and current agent of the DEA. Double Agent and Enforcer of the Venegas Cartel and later Casillas Cartel. Tracy's rival and arch-enemy.
- Elsy Reyes as Carla Uzcátegui (season 5–present): Professional Journalist.
- Alieth Vargas as Susana (season 5)
- Pahola Escalera as Paulina Ugalde (season 5-6): University teacher and Ismael's lover.

=== Introduced in season 6 ===
- Dayana Garroz as Ámbar Maldonado (season 6–7): Venezuelan Militar. Colonel of the National Bolivarian Armed Forces and the Cartel of the Suns. Aurelio's lover and El Chema's lover. Associate of the Casillas Cartel and Venegas Cartel.
- Juanita Arias as Kashi: Milena's lesbian lover. Leonardo's lover, Rutila's friend.
- Gloria Stalina as Milena: Rutila's friend, El Rojo's lover.
- Marisela Berti as Edith Guzmán (season 6–7): The Ambassador of Venezuela.
- Claudia Lobo as Esther (season 6–7): Diana and Berenice's mother and Governor of Coahuila.
- Rafael Uribe as Coronel Garañón: Corrupt Colonel of the ELN and El Cabo's partner.
- Gastón Velandia as Figueroa: El Cabo's right hand man and second in command of the Rastrojos Cartel.
- Daniel Martínez Campos as Arístides Istúriz (season 6–present): Ambar's partner and bodyguard. Luzma's lover.
- Carlos Serrato as Onésimo Jaramillo "El Mocho": El Cabo's second bodyguard and right hand man. Chief of Security and Enforcer of the Rastrojos Cartel.
- Antonio López Torres as El Pulque: Doña Alba's bodyguard and lover. Enforcer of the Casillas Cartel.
- Rubén Arciniegas as Samario (season 6–7): El cabo's right hand man and bodyguard. Enforcer of the Rastrojos Cartel.
- Thali García as Berenice Ahumada (season 6–9): Diana's sister.
- Carlos Balderrama
  - as José Manuel Castillo "El Manny" (season 6-7; reprising his role from El Chema): Former Soccer trainer, El Chema's second right hand man and bodyguard. Chief of security and enforcer for the Venegas Cartel.
  - as Guillermo Antonio Ríos "El Memo" (season 8-present): El Super Javi's bodyguard. Enforcer of the Casillas Cartel.
- Karen Sandoval as Laura (season 6-present): Nurse of Aurelio and Ismael's wife.
- Elkin Córdoba as Nevera (season 6-7): Eulalia's brother. El Cabo's right hand man and second in command of the Rastrojos Cartel after Figueroa.
- María Nela Sinisterra as Eulalia: El Cabo's healer and lover. Nevera's sister.
- Alosian Vivancos as Dylan Gutiérrez "Dj Dylan / El Hacker" (seasons 6-7): Professional hacker of the Rastrojos Cartel. Former Rival of El Greñas.
- María Conchita Alonso as Nora Requena (season 6): North American Attorney General and High-ranking DEA Agent.
- Héctor Bonilla as Arturo López "El Rayo" (season 6): Evelina's missing father. Former Culiacán citizen, Aurelio and Amado's former boxing trainer.
- Roberto Escobar as José Ramiro Valdés (season 6; recurring season 7): Commander of the Cuban Forces.
- Francisco Gattorno as Gustavo Casasola (season 6): Former General of the Cuban Forces.

=== Introduced in season 7 ===
- Manuel Landeta as Cecilio Gutierrez: Dj Dylan's father.
- Nacho Fresneda as Renzo Volpi: Italian Drug Lord and Head of the Balcanes Cartel. El Cabo's ally and enemy of Amado. Associate of the Rastrojos Cartel.
- Julián Román as Joaquín Estrella: Lawyer. El Cabo's legal adviser. Affiliate of the Rastrojos Cartel. Evelina's lover.
- Mabel Moreno as Alejandra: Super Javi's cousin, mother of Angela.
- Camila Jurado as Angela: daughter of Super Javi and Alejandra.
- Denia Agalianou as Dalila Zuc (season 7-present): Former CIA agent and later Viceministry of Public Security.
- Carlos Corona as Rigoberto Alfaro (season 7-present): Corrupt Militar, former head of the anti-drug Division, Viceministry of Public Security and later Ministry of Public Security after Castillo. Former associate of the Commander Valdes and the Rastrojos Cartel.
- Athina Marturet as Athina: ex-CIA agent, previously Amado's business partner, wife of Nicos.
- Giannis Spaliaras as Nicos: ex-CIA agent, previously Amado's business partner.
- Coraima Torres as Rita Peña: Venezuelan Citizen.

=== Introduced in season 8 ===
- Salvador Pineda as Julio Zambrana: Don Cleto's late half-brother. Veteran Drug Lord and Head of the Caborca Cartel.
- Martijn Kuiper as Lucas Manzano: corrupted DEA commissioner and main person responsible for the desecration of the tomb and resurrection of Aurelio Casillas alongside by right hand Tracy Lobo.
- Jorge Cárdenas as Alan Saade
- Oskar Alejandro as Sandro
- Sebastián González as Benjamín; DEA agent.
- Christian De Dios as Humberto 'El Pollero'
- Ivan Raday as El Maton
- Alí Rondón as El Tigre
- Pedro Giunti as El Musaraña
- Roberto Valdez as JP
- Kimberly Evans as Liliana
- Mau Cedeño as Ramsés Yazbek
- Stephano Morales as Angel Flores; Fernando's right hand. Enforcer of the Caborca Cartel.
- Johan Martinez as Alex
- Bea Ranero as Lilita Flores
- Brenda Hanst as Caridad Mendoza
- Mimi Morales as Said Rivero
- Alejandra Redondo as Roberta
- Fede Gallardo as Esteban
- Celia Marcue as Lichita
- Gina Morett as Rosario
- Esperanza Morett as Ines
- Coco Maxima as Ernesto/Vanessa

=== Introduced in season 9 ===
- Carla Carrillo as Amanda Almenar
- Aleida Núñez as Josefina Nieto/ Nina "La Monarca"
- Michel Chauvet as Reynaldo San Román
- Iván Amozurrutia as Dr. Rafael Lazcano
- Cristian Gamero as Lencho

== Special guest stars ==
- La Arrolladora Banda El Limón as Themselves (season 1)
- Larry Hernández as himself (season 1)
- Roberto Tapia as himself (seasons 1–2, 5)
- Aracely Arámbula as La Doña (season 6)
- El Dasa as himself (season 6)
- Murder Clown as himself (season 6)
- Psycho Clown as himself (season 6)
- La Parka as himself (season 6)
- Texano Jr. as himself (season 6)
- Arturo Peniche as Flavio San Román (season 9)
- Francisco Angelini as Rocco San Román (season 9)
