= El Señor de los Cielos season 3 =

El Señor de los Cielos
- Season 3
- Starring: Rafael Amaya; Carmen Villalobos; Mauricio Ochmann; Fernanda Castillo; Carmen Aub
- No. of episodes: 104

Release
- Original network: Telemundo
- Original release: 21 April – 21 September 2015

Season chronology
- ← Previous; Season 2

The third season of the American television series El Señor de los Cielos, was developed by Telemundo, it premiered on April 21, 2015, and ended on September 21, 2015.

== Plot ==
In season three, after several months imprisoned in naval bunker in Mexico, Aurelio receives the mutilated head of his brother Chacorta in a box, giving him reason to wage a war against all his enemies and to find the murderer of his brother, to avenge his death. After all the problems with the government and the DEA, Aurelio learns that he suffers from kidney failure and decides to remember his past in order to find his lost son.

== Cast ==
=== Main ===
- Rafael Amaya as Aurelio Casillas
- Carmen Villalobos as Leonor Ballesteros
- Mauricio Ochmann as José María Venegas Mendivíl "El Chema"
- Fernanda Castillo as Mónica Robles
- Carmen Aub as Rutila Casillas
- Maritza Rodríguez as Amparo Rojas

=== Recurring ===
- Sabrina Seara as Esperanza Salvatierra
- Sergio Mur as Tim Rawlings
- Gala Montes as Luz Marina "Luzma" Casillas Letrán
- Lisa Owen as Doña Alba Casillas
- Tommy Vásquez as Álvaro José Pérez "Tijeras"
- Manuel Balbi as Rodrigo Rivero
- Leonardo Daniel as Don Alfredo "Feyo" Aguilera
- Jesús Moré as Omar Terán Robles
- Alejandro de la Madrid as Ignacio Miravalle
- Verónica Montes as Belén Guerrero "La Condesa"
- Alejandro López Silva as El Súper Jav
- Jorge Luis Moreno as Víctor Casillas Rámos "Victor Jr / Chacortita"
- Carlos Torres as Enrique Morejón
- Sandra Beltrán as Julia Reyes
- Viviana Serna as Cristina Salgado
- Sebastián Caicedo as Eleazar Yepes
- Bárbara Singer as Elisa Peña
- Tomás Goros as General Antonio Garnica
- Sahit Sosa as Ernesto Gamboa
- Sandra Díaz as Irma Veracierta
- Edgardo González as Lilo Planas
- Ofelia Guiza as Diana Quiñones
- Sebastián Ferrat as Juan Antonio Marcado
- Sebastian Urdiales as Carlos "Carlitos" Casillas
  - Adrián Herrera as Carlos "Carlitos" Casillas Rojas
- Fernando Sarfatti as Valentín Fons
- Néstor Rodulfo as General Camilo Jaramillo
- Alejandro Félix as Chatarrero
- Ligia Petit as Gloria
- Marco Zetina as Dr. Ricardo Monteverde
- Arnulfo Reyes Sánchez as Benjamín "El Espanto"
- José Juan Meraz as Ramón
- Alejandro Navarrete as El Zopilote
- Gabriel Coronel as Armando Pérez
- Christian Tappan as Gustavo Gaviria "El Oficial"
- Roxana Chávez as Eva Ernestina Gallardo
- Iván Tamayo as Jorge Elías Salazar
- Marco Treviño as Abel Terán
- Lorena del Castillo as Officer Evelyn García
- Franklin Virgüez as General Diosdado Carreño
- Mauricio Garza as Fabricio Varón "El Chef"
- Cristian Satin as El Roto
- Marina de Tavira as Begoña Barraza
- Citlali Galindo as Mayra Rodríguez
- Emilio Chabre as Humberto Venegas Casillas "El Chemita"
- Daniela Zavala as Arelis Mendoza
- Arturo Echeverria as Jack Melendez
- Plutarco Haza as Dalvio Navarrete "El Ingeniero"
- Alejandro Usigli as Justino Guerrero
- Cesar Izaguirre as Juan Martín Peña

== Episodes ==
No. overall	No. in season	Title	Original release date
159	1	"Odio sin fin"	April 21, 2015
160	2	"En familia"	April 22, 2015
161	3	"La Bestia"	April 23, 2015
162	4	"Asedio burlado"	April 24, 2015
163	5	"Proximidad"	April 27, 2015
164	6	"El pacto"	April 28, 2015
165	7	"El ajuste"	April 29, 2015
166	8	"Asalto mortal"	May 1, 2015
167	9	"Escurridizo"	May 4, 2015
168	10	"La sentencia"	May 5, 2015
169	11	"Intransigente"	May 6, 2015
170	12	"Reclamos"	May 7, 2015
171	13	"Inversiones"	May 8, 2015
172	14	"Viuda culpada"	May 11, 2015
173	15	"Todo sale mal"	May 12, 2015
174	16	"Destrozados"	May 14, 2015
175	17	"Nuevo Chacorta"	May 15, 2015
176	18	"El Seductor"	May 18, 2015
177	19	"Guerra familiar"	May 19, 2015
178	20	"Acto atroz"	May 20, 2015
179	21	"Desesperada"	May 21, 2015
180	22	"Alianza"	May 22, 2015
181	23	"Orden mortal"	May 25, 2015
182	24	"Sacrificio"	May 26, 2015
183	25	"Debilidad"	May 27, 2015
184	26	"Ultrajada"	May 28, 2015
185	27	"Imperdonable"	May 29, 2015
186	28	"Cara a cara"	June 1, 2015
187	29	"Pacto siniestro"	June 3, 2015
188	30	"Padre enfurecido"	June 4, 2015
189	31	"Revelaciones"	June 8, 2015
190	32	"Emboscado"	June 9, 2015
191	33	"Lealtad"	June 10, 2015
192	34	"Juntos"	June 11, 2015
193	35	"Jefe real"	June 12, 2015
194	36	"Soplones"	June 15, 2015
195	37	"La representante"	June 16, 2015
196	38	"Intermediaria"	June 17, 2015
197	39	"En crisis"	June 18, 2015
198	40	"Apoyo incondicional"	June 22, 2015
199	41	"Traicionada"	June 23, 2015
200	42	"Beso bienvenido"	June 24, 2015
201	43	"Arrepentido"	June 25, 2015
202	44	"Celos asesinos"	June 26, 2015
203	45	"Pacto de amor"	June 29, 2015
204	46	"Mi hombre"	June 30, 2015
205	47	"Irresistible"	July 1, 2015
206	48	"Tu calvario"	July 2, 2015
207	49	"Acercamiento"	July 3, 2015
208	50	"Socia de infarto"	July 6, 2015
209	51	"Las cuentas"	July 7, 2015
210	52	"Por puro placer"	July 8, 2015
211	53	"De tal palo..."	July 9, 2015
212	54	"Cambio de rubro"	July 10, 2015
213	55	"Bajo fuego"	July 13, 2015
214	56	"El Güero"	July 14, 2015
215	57	"Belén y Aurelio"	July 15, 2015
216	58	"De nuevo"	July 16, 2015
217	59	"Sana y salva"	July 17, 2015
218	60	"Sospechosa"	July 20, 2015
219	61	"Mi papá"	July 21, 2015
220	62	"Entre bandidos"	July 22, 2015
221	63	"Acá te espero"	July 23, 2015
222	64	"A salvo"	July 24, 2015
223	65	"Pasión"	July 28, 2015
224	66	"En sus brazos"	July 29, 2015
225	67	"Intento"	July 30, 2015
226	68	"Cornudo"	July 31, 2015
227	69	"Todo estalla"	August 3, 2015
228	70	"Degollada"	August 4, 2015
229	71	"Despedida"	August 5, 2015
230	72	"Otro whisky"	August 6, 2015
231	73	"La tía Mónica"	August 7, 2015
232	74	"Sorprendida"	August 10, 2015
233	75	"Huir de la furia"	August 11, 2015
234	76	"Dolor"	August 12, 2015
235	77	"Sin control"	August 13, 2015
236	78	"La señora"	August 14, 2015
237	79	"De una vez"	August 17, 2015
238	80	"Choque de trenes"	August 18, 2015
239	81	"Fue su tío"	August 19, 2015
240	82	"A golpes"	August 21, 2015
241	83	"Lavado de dinero"	August 24, 2015
242	84	"Planes en grande"	August 25, 2015
243	85	"De la madriguera"	August 26, 2015
244	86	"Comprando"	August 27, 2015
245	87	"Los 34"	August 28, 2015
246	88	"Pago con sangre"	August 31, 2015
247	89	"Leonor muere"	September 1, 2015
248	90	"Bajo ataque"	September 1, 2015
249	91	"Ojo por ojo"	September 2, 2015
250	92	"Un riñón"	September 3, 2015
251	93	"El Oficial"	September 4, 2015
252	94	"De la selva"	September 7, 2015
253	95	"La lista"	September 8, 2015
254	96	"La era"	September 9, 2015
255	97	"De exportación"	September 10, 2015
256	98	"Perdido"	September 11, 2015
257	99	"El trofeo"	September 14, 2015
258	100	"La caída"	September 15, 2015
259	101	"Los hilos"	September 16, 2015
260	102	"Un nuevo negocio"	September 17, 2015
261	103	"En la mira"	September 18, 2015
262	104	"El Diablo soy yo"	September 21, 2015

== Production ==
On May 14, 2014, Telemundo renewed El Señor de los Cielos for a third season. Filming of the season in February 2015.
