= El Señor de los Cielos season 2 =

El Señor de los Cielos
- Season 2
- Season 2 poster
- Starring: Rafael Amaya; Ximena Herrera; Carmen Villalobos; Mauricio Ochmann; Raúl Méndez; Fernanda Castillo; Marlene Favela
- No. of episodes: 84

Release
- Original network: Telemundo
- Original release: 26 May – 22 September 2014

Season chronology
- ← Previous; Season 1 Next → Season 3

The second season of the American television series El Señor de los Cielos, was developed by Telemundo, it premiered on May 26, 2014, and ended on September 22, 2014.

== Plot ==
In season two, believed to be dead, Aurelio returns to enact his revenge on police officer Leonor Ballesteros, who through her fault ends up operating his face in a failed attempt to escape from the authorities. Aurelio meets Victoria Navárez, a beautiful woman who throws herself to be the governor of Jalisco. Aurelio, after seeing her actions, falls in love and decides to deceive her by posing as another man and usurping the identity of Danilo Ferro. A character that is then introduced is José María "Chema" Venegas, one of the great enemies of Aurelio who decides to take all its power to Aurelio. At the end of the season, Leonor captures Aurelio and lasts several months in prison naval bunker.

== Cast ==
=== Main ===
- Rafael Amaya as Aurelio Casillas
- Ximena Herrera as Ximena Letrán
- Carmen Villalobos as Leonor Ballesteros
- Mauricio Ochmann as José María Venegas Mendivil "El Chema"
- Raúl Méndez as Víctor Casillas "Chacorta"
- Fernanda Castillo as Mónica Robles
- Marlene Favela as Victoria Navárez "La Gober"

=== Recurring ===
- Robinson Díaz as Miltón Jiménez / Pío José Valdivia "El Cabo"
- Sara Corrales as Matilde Rojas
- Carmen Aub as Rutila Casillas
  - Ana Sofía Durán as Child Rutila
- Erika de la Rosa as Elsa Marín
- Manuela González as Lorelay "Lay" Cadena
- Alejandro de la Madrid as Ignacio Miravalle
- Ari Brikman as Jeremy Andrews
- Lisa Owen as Doña Alba Casillas
- Tommy Vásquez as Álvaro José Pérez "Tijeras"
- Emmanuel Orenday as Gregorio Ponte Hernández
- Carlos Torrestorija as Maximiliano "Max" Miravalle
- Tomás Goros as General Antonio Garnica
- Surya MacGregor as Cecilia
- Antonio de la Vega as Santiago Echeverría
- Ruy Senderos as Heriberto Casillas
- Miguel Melo as Young Víctor Casillas Rámos "Victor Jr"
- Sahit Sosa as Ernesto Gamboa
- Juan Luis Orendain as Father Lázaro Sánchez
- Ausencio Cruz as José Antonio Gutiérrez Velarde "Pepe Johnson"
- Toño Muñiz as Coronel Marcelino Ramos
- Irineo Álvarez as Pedro Navárez
- Flavio Peniche as Mario Quintero "El Bigotes"
- Karla Sofía Gascón as Iñaki Izarrieta
- Sandra Díaz as Irma Veracierta
- Manuel Balbi as Rodrigo Rivero Lanz
- Sebastián Caicedo as Gustavo "El Tostado" Yepes
- Edgardo González as Lilo Planas
- Ofelia Guiza as Diana Quiñones
- José Juan Meraz as Ramón
- Daniel Rascón as El Toro
- David Ponce as José Manrique "Skinny"
- Carlos Puente as Pompeyo
- Paloma Ruiz de Alda as Helga
- Alejandra Toussaint as Chabela
- Palmeira Cruz as Lucila Sosa
- Sebastian Dopazo as Danilo Ferro
- Fernando Banda as Agustín Chon "El Vitaminas
- Sophie Gómez as Irina Vorodin
- Arturo Barba as Alí Benjuema "El Turco"

== Episodes ==
No. overall	No. in season	Title	Original release date
75	1	"Sorpresa y venganza"	May 26, 2014
76	2	"Rescate y emboscada"	May 27, 2014
77	3	"Escape"	May 28, 2014
78	4	"Nuevos horizontes"	May 29, 2014
79	5	"Trampa"	May 30, 2014
80	6	"Reencuentro"	June 2, 2014
81	7	"Detención"	June 3, 2014
82	8	"Propuestas"	June 4, 2014
83	9	"Perdóname mi amor"	June 5, 2014
84	10	"Estrategia"	June 6, 2014
85	11	"Escondite"	June 9, 2014
86	12	"Entrega especial"	June 10, 2014
87	13	"Bombas"	June 11, 2014
88	14	"Celos"	June 12, 2014
89	15	"Muerte inocente"	June 13, 2014
90	16	"Confesiones"	June 16, 2014
91	17	"La condena"	June 17, 2014
92	18	"Rehén"	June 18, 2014
93	19	"Amenaza"	June 19, 2014
94	20	"Libertad"	June 20, 2014
95	21	"Al descubierto"	June 23, 2014
96	22	"Determinación"	June 24, 2014
97	23	"Decisiones"	June 25, 2014
98	24	"El fruto del amor"	June 26, 2014
99	25	"Heriberto"	June 27, 2014
100	26	"El amor de Lai"	June 30, 2014
101	27	"Unión"	July 1, 2014
102	28	"Traición"	July 2, 2014
103	29	"Malos entendidos"	July 3, 2014
104	30	"Nuevas oportunidades"	July 7, 2014
105	31	"Denuncia"	July 8, 2014
106	32	"Intento de soborno"	July 9, 2014
107	33	"La vieja casa"	July 10, 2014
108	34	"Miedo"	July 11, 2014
109	35	"Huida"	July 14, 2014
110	36	"Impedimento"	July 15, 2014
111	37	"Perdida"	July 16, 2014
112	38	"Venganza"	July 17, 2014
113	39	"Secuestro"	July 18, 2014
114	40	"Emboscada"	July 21, 2014
115	41	"Secreto"	July 22, 2014
116	42	"Reclamo"	July 23, 2014
117	43	"Danilo Ferro"	July 24, 2014
118	44	"Asesino"	July 25, 2014
119	45	"La Gober"	July 28, 2014
120	46	"Confesión"	July 29, 2014
121	47	"Seducción"	July 30, 2014
122	48	"Fuga"	July 31, 2014
123	49	"Susto"	August 1, 2014
124	50	"Ave María Purísima"	August 4, 2014
125	51	"Tortura"	August 5, 2014
126	52	"Atracción"	August 6, 2014
127	53	"Mónica"	August 7, 2014
128	54	"Encuestas"	August 8, 2014
129	55	"Pacto"	August 11, 2014
130	56	"Víctima"	August 12, 2014
131	57	"Condena"	August 13, 2014
132	58	"Traicionado"	August 14, 2014
133	59	"Matilde"	August 15, 2014
134	60	"Enfrentamiento"	August 18, 2014
135	61	"Rodeados"	August 19, 2014
136	62	"Eliminado"	August 20, 2014
137	63	"Guerra"	August 22, 2014
138	64	"Ataque"	August 25, 2014
139	65	"Manotas"	August 26, 2014
140	66	"Informante"	August 27, 2014
141	67	"Búsqueda"	August 28, 2014
142	68	"Patrón"	August 29, 2014
143	69	"Rutila"	September 1, 2014
144	70	"Desaparición"	September 2, 2014
145	71	"Manipulación"	September 3, 2014
146	72	"Inseguridad"	September 4, 2014
147	73	"Protección"	September 5, 2014
148	74	"Apoyo"	September 8, 2014
149	75	"El Escuadrón de la Muerte"	September 9, 2014
150	76	"Negociación"	September 10, 2014
151	77	"Entrega"	September 11, 2014
152	78	"General Garnica"	September 12, 2014
153	79	"Sicarios"	September 15, 2014
154	80	"Ximena"	September 16, 2014
155	81	"Despedida"	September 17, 2014
156	82	"Engaño"	September 18, 2014
157	83	"Chema Venegas"	September 19, 2014
158	84	"Leonor Ballesteros"	September 22, 2014

== Production ==
In November 2013, Telemundo renewed El Señor de los Cielos for a second season. Filming of the season began the following month.
