= Sandra Díaz =

Sandra Díaz may refer to:

- Sandra Díaz (actress) (born c. 1991), Venezuelan actress and model
- Sandra Díaz (ecologist) (born 1961), Argentine ecologist
- Sandra Diaz-Twine (born 1974), American television personality
