= There Are No Saints =

- Film poster
- Directed by: Alfonso Pineda Ulloa
- Written by: Paul Schrader
- Produced by: Santiago Garcia Galvan; Alex García; Jose Martinez Jr.
- Starring: José María Yazpik; Paz Vega; Shannyn Sossamon; Neal McDonough; Ron Perlman; Tim Roth
- Cinematography: Mateo Londono
- Edited by: Dan Lebental
- Music by: Heitor Pereira
- Production companies: Itaca Films; Latam Pictures; Open Window Productions; BN Films
- Distributed by: Paramount Pictures; Saban Films
- Release date: May 27, 2022
- Running time: 100 minutes
- Countries: United States; Mexico
- Language: English

There Are No Saints is a 2022 action thriller film directed by Alfonso Pineda Ulloa, written by Paul Schrader, and starring José María Yazpik, Paz Vega, Ron Perlman and Tim Roth.

== Premise ==
The Jesuit, a former gang enforcer who has been wrongly imprisoned, seeks revenge after his ex-wife is murdered by her vicious new husband, who kidnaps his son and takes him to Mexico. Joined by a stripper named Inez, he embarks on a quest to get his son back and avenge his fallen life.

== Cast ==
- José María Yazpik as Neto Niente
- Ron Perlman as Sans
- Shannyn Sossamon as Inez
- Paz Vega as Nadia
- Tim Roth as Carl Abrahams
- Keidrich Sellati as Julio Niente
- Neal McDonough as Vincent
- Tommy Flanagan as Jet Rink

== Production ==
The project, originally titled The Jesuit, was first announced in 2010 with Paul Schrader also directing. Willem Dafoe, Michelle Rodriguez, Paz Vega and Manolo Cardona were set to star. In 2012, Alfonso Pineda Ulloa replaced Schrader as a director and some actors were replaced. The film has been completed since 2014.

== Release ==
The film was released in theaters and on VOD on May 27, 2022.

== Reception ==
On the review aggregator website Rotten Tomatoes, 26% of 27 critics' reviews are positive, with an average rating of 3.8/10. The website's consensus reads: "There Are No Saints, and the number of reasons to watch this shoddy, mean-spirited action thriller is also perilously close to zero." Metacritic, which uses a weighted average, assigned the film a score of 30 out of 100, based on 6 critics, indicating "generally unfavorable" reviews.

Mark Hanson of Slant Magazine awarded the film two and a half stars out of four and wrote, "At its best, Alfonso Pineda Ulloa's film gleefully embodies the grungy spirit of classic exploitation cinema."

Julian Roman of MovieWeb gave the film a positive review and wrote, "Famed screenwriter Paul Schrader goes ultra gritty in a bloody actioner that savages the innocent. [...] The narrative suffers from generic action tropes; but gets a pass for its brutal characters and willingness to defy convention."

Josh Bell of Comic Book Resources gave the film a negative review and wrote that it's "full of the hallmarks of a movie that's been extensively retooled in post-production..."
