= José María Yazpik =

Mexican actor (born 1970)

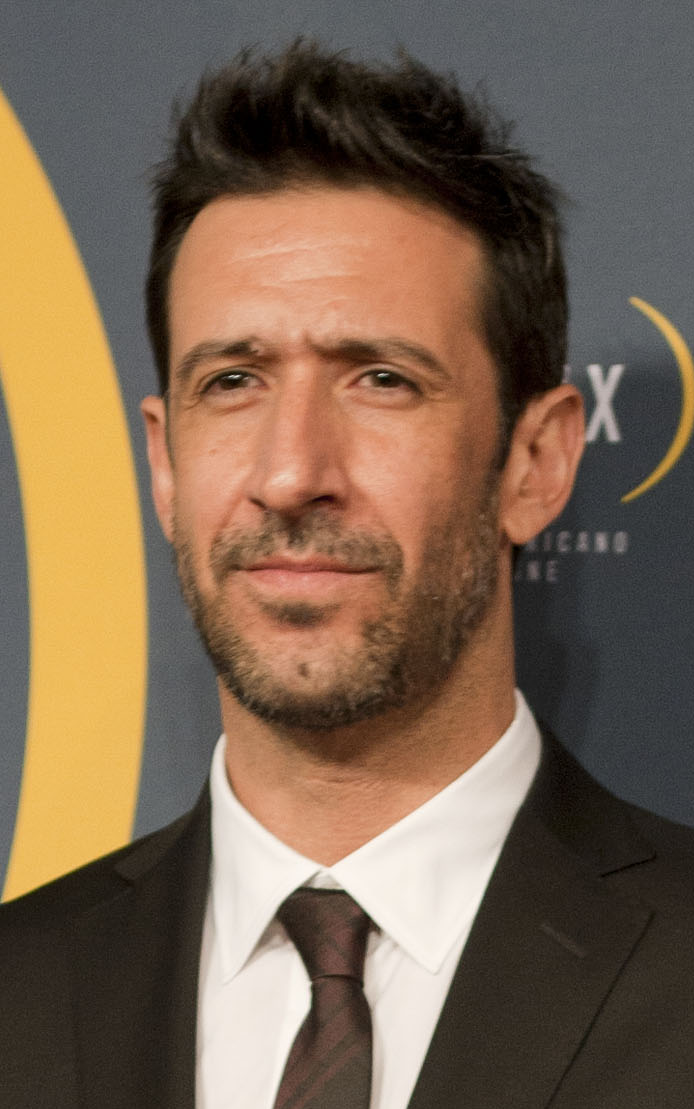
- Born: José María Meza Yazpik; November 13, 1970 (age 55); Mexico City, México
- Occupation: Actor
- Years active: 1995–present

José María Yazpik (born November 13, 1970) is a Mexican actor. He is best known for his portrayal of Amado Carrillo Fuentes in the third season of Narcos (2017) and in its three-season follow-up series Narcos: Mexico (2018–2021).

== Biography ==
Yazpik was born in Mexico City, Mexico, into a wealthy family, the son of successful gynaecologist José María Meza and housewife Cristina Yazpik. His mother is of Lebanese descent. He has two siblings. When Yazpik was a child, his father decided to move the family to San Diego, California, United States, and started a practice in Tijuana. The family settled in La Jolla. After his father's practice failed, the family moved to Tijuana, but Yazpik and his brother continued going to school in San Diego.

Yazpik's first acting job came from a friend of his father, who produced the television film The Brute With the Angel of Death. He moved to Mexico City to study at the Centro de Educación Artística (CEA), run by broadcasting company Televisa. Upon graduating he was offered minor roles in youth soap operas on Televisa. He had his first major role on television in the soap opera The Dove in 1995, produced by José Rendón, which stopped production because of the death of its star actor Gerardo Hemmer.

In 1996, Yazpik acted in his second telenovela, Song of Love, produced by Luis de Llano Macedo, and in the film Última llamada, directed by Carlos Garcia Agraz. In 1997, he gained roles in television, playing a villainous youth in the telenovelas Pueblo chico, infierno grande and Ángela, both produced by José Alberto Castro.

Yazpik portrayed Mexican narcotics trafficker, Amado Carrillo Fuentes in the third season of the Netflix drama series Narcos (2017) and in all three seasons of Narcos: Mexico (2018–2021).

== Filmography ==
=== Film ===
- Última llamada (1996) as Pizzarista
- Talk to Her (2002) as Minor Role (uncredited)
- The Blue Room (2002) as Roberto
- Tiro de gracia (2003, Short)
- Sin ton ni Sonia (2003) as Mauricio
- Shot of Grace (2003)
- Nicotina (2004) as Joaquin
- Bad Education (2004) as Minor Role (uncredited)
- Crónicas (2004) as Iván Suárez
- Pata de gallo (2004, Short) as Executive
- Voces inocentes (2004) as Uncle Beto
- Sueño (2005) as Pancho
- Las vueltas del citrillo (2006) as Jose Isabel
- Solo Dios sabe (2006) as Jonathan
- Matapájaros (2006, Short)
- Un mundo maravilloso (2006) as Financial Advisor
- Last Call (2006) as Pizzarista
- Borderland (2007) as Zoilo
- Por siempre (2007, Short)
- La hora cero (2008, Short) as Lorenzo
- The Burning Plain (2008) as Carlos
- Beverly Hills Chihuahua (2008) as Vasquez
- Just Walking (2008) as Felix
- Abel (2010) as Anselmo
- El atentado (2010) as Arnulfo Arroyo
- Colosio: El asesinato (2012) as Andres Vazquez
- Morelos (2012) as Ignacio López Rayón
- El Santos vs. La Tetona Mendoza (2012) as Peyote Asesino (voice)
- Tijuana, te amo (2012) as Anthony
- I'm So Excited (2013) as Infante
- No sé si cortarme las venas o dejármelas largas (2013) as Actor TvNovela
- Fighting for Freedom (2013) as Oscar Salazar
- The Obscure Spring (2014) as Igor / Husband
- Mr. Pig (2016) as Payo
- Everybody Loves Somebody (2017) as Daniel
- The Future Ahead (2017)
- Powder (2019) as El Chato
- There Are No Saints (2022) as Neto Niente
- Eureka (2023)
- Madame Web (2024) as Santiago
- Greedy People (2024) as The Colombian
- Apocalypse Z: The Beginning of the End (2024) as Pritchenko
- You're Dating a Narcissist! (2026) as Daniel
- Apocalypse Z: New World (2026) as Pritchenko

=== Television ===
- The Dove (1995) as Angel
- Song of Love (1996) as Swami
- Pueblo chico, infierno grande (1997) as Sebastian Paleo "Bataan" (young)
- Ángela (1998) as Rene Bautista Solórzano
- Life in the mirror (1999) as Roman Mauricio Franco
- All for Love (2000) as Matthew
- Fidel (2002, TV Movie) as Camilo Cienfuegos
- Heads or Tails (2002) as Armando Fisherman
- Cries of death and freedom (2010) as Antonio Lopez de Santa Anna
- Narcos (2017) as Amado Carrillo Fuentes
- Narcos: Mexico (2018–2021) as Amado Carrillo Fuentes
- The Gringo Hunters (2025) as Joaquin Meyer-Rodriguez
