= Jean Paul Leroux =

Venezuelan actor

Jean-Paul Leroux (born 7 January 1976) is a Venezuelan film actor. His career started in small roles in theater, but his true career started in the critically acclaimed movie Secuestro Express in 2005, along with Argentine actress Mía Maestro. He also appeared in the 2006 Venezuelan film Elipsis along with Gaby Espino, Edgar Ramírez and Christina Dieckmann among others. He acted in the Spanish-Venezuelan film Lo que tiene el otro, directed by Miguel Perello. He also played the starring role in "Por Un Polvo", a Venezuelan film by Carlos Malave. In 2007 he acted in the Colombian film "La Vida era en Serio" directed by Monica Borda. And recently played the starring role in the Venezuelan film "Las Caras del Diablo"

== Filmography ==
=== Telenovelas ===
- Ciudad Bendita (2006-2007) as Jerry Colón
- La Trepadora (2008) as Nicolás Del Casal
- Quiero amarte (2013) as Jorge de la Parra
- Las Bandidas (2013) as Sergio Navarro
- 2091 (2016) as Reznik
