= Powder (2019 film) =

2019 Mexican film by José María Yazpik

- Theatrical release poster
- Directed by: José María Yazpik
- Written by: José María Yazpik; Alejandro Ricaño
- Produced by: Eamon O’Farrill; Mónica Lozano; Carlos Meza Yázpik; José María Yázpik
- Starring: José María Yazpik
- Cinematography: Tonatiuh Martínez
- Edited by: Miguel Schverdfinger
- Music by: Sergio Acosta; Andrés Sánchez Maher
- Production companies: Alebrije Producciones; Tintorera Producciones
- Distributed by: Diamond Films
- Release dates: October 20, 2019 (MIFF); November 8, 2019 (Mexico)
- Running time: 88 minutes
- Country: Mexico
- Language: Spanish
- Box office: $361,238

Powder (Spanish: Polvo) is a 2019 Mexican crime comedy-drama film directed and starred by José María Yazpik (in his directorial debut) and written by Yazpik & Alejandro Ricaño. In supporting roles are Mariana Treviño, Adrián Vázquez, Carlos Valencia, Guillermo Nava, Irineo Álvarez, Manuel Poncelis, Angélica Aragón, Jesús Ochoa, Joaquín Cosío and Carlos Olalla.

== Synopsis ==
In 1972, El Chato left his hometown in San Ignacio to pursue the American dream; 10 years later he returns with the aim of recovering cocaine belonging to the Tijuana mafia that accidentally fell in his hometown. He will have to get the packages while maintaining peace in the town, although he will also have the opportunity to resume his old life.

== Cast ==
The actors participating in this film are:

- José María Yazpik as El Chato
- Mariana Treviño as Jacinta
- Adrián Vázquez as Toto
- Carlos Valencia as Fisher
- Guillermo Nava as Chuy
- Irineo Álvarez as Tano
- Manuel Poncelis as Facundo
- Angélica Aragón as Doña Mary
- Jesús Ochoa as Doctor
- Joaquín Cosío as Don Manuel
- Carlos Olalla as Leovigildo
- Giovani Florido as Pancho
- Franciso Javier López Lucero as Totito
- Wendolee Ayala as Juanita
- Laura Ofelia Reyes Marín as "La Tibu"
- Emiliano Fong as Don Chema
- J. Eduardo Murillo Aguilar as Bully boy
- Carmen Vera as "La Lupana"
- Judith Álvarez Juárez as Mimí

== Production ==
Principal photography began on September 3, 2018, in San Ignacio, Baja California, also with locations in Tijuana.

== Release ==
Powder had its world premiere on October 20, 2019, at the 17th Morelia International Film Festival. It was commercially released on November 8, 2019, in Mexican theaters.

== Reception ==
=== Critical reception ===
Mabel Salinas from Cine Premiere gave a positive review, highlighting the acting of José María Yazpik, Mariana Treviño, Jesús Ochoa and Adrián Vázquez. She further praised Tonatiuh Martínez's photography, and liked the film despite feeling as though the pacing and story were lacking. Jesús Chavarría from the newspaper La Razon concluded that this production is a simple comedy, perhaps not very risky, but that manages to be consistent in its humor and, above all, funny, creating its own identity.

=== Accolades ===
Year	Award / Festival	Category	Recipient	Result	Ref.
2019	Morelia International Film Festival	Best Actress in a Mexican Feature Film	Mariana Treviño	Won	
2019	Canacine Awards	Best Film	José María Yazpik	Nominated	
2019	Canacine Awards	Best Director	José María Yazpik	Nominated	
2019	Canacine Awards	Best Actor	José María Yazpik	Won	
2020	Ariel Awards	Best Picture	José María Yazpik	Nominated	
2020	Ariel Awards	Best Director	José María Yazpik	Nominated	
2020	Ariel Awards	Best First Work	José María Yazpik	Nominated	
2020	Ariel Awards	Best Original Screenplay	José María Yazpik & Alejandro Ricaño	Nominated	
2020	Ariel Awards	Best Actor	José María Yazpik	Nominated	
2020	Ariel Awards	Best Actress	Mariana Treviño	Nominated	
2020	Ariel Awards	Best Supporting Actor	Adrián Vázquez	Nominated	
2020	Ariel Awards	Best Cinematography	Tonatiuh Martínez	Nominated	
2020	Ariel Awards	Best Editing	Miguel Schverdfinger	Nominated	
2020	Ariel Awards	Best Art Direction	Bárbara Enriquez & Carmen Guerrero	Nominated	
2020	Ariel Awards	Best Costume Design	Adela Cortázar	Nominated	
