= La Trepadora =

- Genre: Telenovela
- Created by: Ricardo Hernández Anzola
- Based on: La Trepadora by Rómulo Gallegos
- Written by: Ana Carolina López; Carmen García Vilar; Sergio Espluga; Gloria Soares
- Directed by: Vicente Albarracín
- Creative director: Ana Rosa Gallegos
- Starring: Norkys Batista; Jean Paul Leroux; Ana Karina Casanova; Marialejandra Martín; Emma Rabbe; Aroldo Betancourt
- Opening theme: "Solamente tú" by Rommel Rodríguez
- Country of origin: Venezuela
- Original language: Spanish
- No. of seasons: 1
- No. of episodes: 170

Production
- Executive producer: Jhony Pulido Mora
- Producer: Mileyba Álvarez Barreto
- Production locations: Llanos, Venezuela
- Editor: Carlos Briceño

Original release
- Network: RCTV Internacional
- Release: March 15 – October 3, 2008

Related
- Toda una dama; Nadie me dirá como quererte

La trepadora (English title:Passionate Revenge) is a 2008 Venezuelan telenovela produced by RCTV based on a novel of the same name written by Rómulo Gallegos in 1925.

Norkys Batista and Jean Paul Leroux star as the main protagonists with Emma Rabbe, Aroldo Betancourt and Ana Karina Casanova as the main antagonists.

== Plot ==
Nicolás del Casal is a direct descendant of Cantarrana's previous owners, the hacienda where Hilario, his half-uncle, and his family have been residing. Raised in Europe, he returns to Venezuela to face his past, and he plans to repossess the property which was taken from his father, Jaime "Jaimito" del Casal. When he arrives in Venezuelan territory, he meets Nicolás Guanipa Victoria, the daughter of Hilario Guanipa, his sworn enemy. Victoria is a strong-willed woman who loves to show the world she was born to lead. She is a naive woman who has grown up all her life in the security of the Cantarrana Hacienda. Victoria is also the daughter of Hilario Guanipa, the bastard son of Jaime del Casal, who will be the center of Nicolás' revenge. Hilario grew up resenting his half brothers who always made him feel inferior to them and under the social prejudice of being an illegitimate child. Because of this resentment, Hilario became a ruthless man who fraudulently seized the Cantarrana Hacienda, disregarding the rights of the legitimate heirs. His actions led to the suicide of Louie del Casal, his half-brother, who killed himself after being stripped of what was rightfully his and his family's.

== Cast ==
- Norkys Batista as Victoria Guanipa Salcedo.
- Jean Paul Leroux as Nicolás Del Casal.
- Ana Karina Casanova as Florencia Zapata.
- Marialejandra Martín as Adelaida Salcedo de Guanipa.
- Emma Rabbe as Fernanda Del Casal de Alcoy.
- Aroldo Betancourt as Hilario Guanipa.
- Ricardo Bianchi as Carlos Hansen.
- Jalymar Salomón as Antonieta Alcoy Del Casal.
- Gonzálo Velutini as Leopoldo Alcoy.
- Johanna Morales as Clementina.
- Miguel Ángel Cardiel as Jack Builder.
- María Cristina Lozada as Carmencita Salcedo.
- Kimberly Dos Ramos as Eugenia Alcoy Del Casal.
- Luis Fernando Sosa as Federico Alcoy Del Casal.
- Gabriel López as Yosmir.
- José Ramón Barreto as Chabeto.
- Alberto Alifa as Rosendo Zapata.
- Jesús Ceijas as Zambrano.
- Luke Grande as Caravaggio.
- Jeannette Flores as Yajaira.
- Erick Ronsó as Felipe Osuna.
- Chris Medina as Alejandro Gunipa.
- José Madonía as Jonás.
- Aleska Díaz-Granados as Isaura.
- César Suárez as Moncho.
- Myriam Abreu as Liliana García.
- Iriana Martínez as Genara.
- José Leal as Sigfrido.
- Alejandro Otero as Sergio
- Sandra Díaz es Francia.
