= Las bandidas =

2013 Spanish-language telenovela

- Genre: Telenovela
- Written by: Benilde Ávila; Luis Colmenares; Carmen García Vilar; Neida Padilla; César Miguel Rondón
- Story by: César Miguel Rondón
- Directed by: Tony Rodríguez; Santiago Vargas; Henry Colmenares; Luiz Manzo
- Starring: Ana Lucía Domínguez; Marco Méndez; Daniela Bascopé; Marjorie Magri; Daniel Lugo; Guillermo Dávila; Jean Paul Leroux; Claudia La Gatta; Caridad Canelón
- Countries of origin: Mexico; Venezuela; Colombia
- Original language: Spanish
- No. of episodes: 120

Production
- Executive producers: Andrés Santamaría; Hugo León Ferrer
- Producer: Altair Castro
- Production locations: Caracas, Venezuela
- Cinematography: Willie Balcazar; José Rojas
- Editor: César Manzano
- Camera setup: Multi-camera
- Production companies: RTI Producciones; Televisa

Original release
- Network: Televen; Canal de las Estrellas; RCN TV
- Release: April 3 – September 3, 2013

Related
- Las amazonas (Venezuelan TV series); Las amazonas (Mexican TV series)

Las bandidas (Bandits) is a 2013 Spanish-language telenovela that was produced by RTI Producciones and Televisa for Mexico-based television network Canal de las Estrellas and Colombia-based television network RCN TV, and for Venezuelan TV network Televen. It is a remake of Las amazonas, a Venezuelan telenovela produced for Venevisión. Ana Lucía Domínguez and Marco Méndez will star as the protagonists.

== Plot ==
Las bandidas tells the story of three sisters, who were raised in a different way by their father who is engaged in the business of breeding horses. The three sisters seek to build their path in their lives, in ways that are not exactly what their father envisioned for them.

== Cast ==
=== Main ===
- Ana Lucía Domínguez as Fabiola Montoya, she is the eldest daughter of Olegario Montoya, who has delegated to it the administration of the Treasury "Las Bandidas".
- Marco Méndez as Alonso Cáceres, he is a veterinarian.
- Daniela Bascopé as Corina Montoya, Olegario's second daughter. She is a biologist.
- Marjorie Magri as Amparo Montoya, Olegario's youngest daughter.
- Daniel Lugo as Olegario Montoya, he owns the Hacienda "Las Bandidas". And father of Fabiola, Corina and Amparo.
- Guillermo Dávila as Rodrigo Irazábal, Olegario enemy. Owner of the "Hacienda Irazábal". Prestigious and attractive biologist.
- Jean Paul Leroux as Sergio Navarro, Fabiola boyfriend and trusted man Olegario.
- Claudia La Gatta as Malena Montoya, the second and current wife of Olegario.
- Caridad Canelón as Zenaida Mijares "Yaya", mother of Rubén. Housekeeper Hacienda "Las Bandidas" and confident woman Olegario Montoya.

=== Recurring ===
- Carlos Cruz as Matacán, trusted man Olegario and executor of his orders
- Gabriel Parisi as Reynaldo Castillo, he is Amparo boyfriend Montoya.
- Christian McGaffney as Rubén Mijares, Zenaida son. Pawn of Hacienda "Las Bandidas", where he lives and works.
- Héctor Peña as Vicente Uribe, Corina study partner.
- Sabrina Salvador as Dinorah
- Gioia Arismendi as Marta Moreno
- Crisbel Henriquez as Nelly
- Milena Santander as Fermina
- Nany Tovar as Julia
- Laureano Olivares as Remigio
- María Cristina Lozada as Doña Ricarda Irázabal

=== Guest ===
- Roberto Messutti as Tulio Irazabal
- Sandra Díaz as Betsabe
- Miguel de León as Gaspar Infante

== Broadcast ==
The series originally aired from April 3, 2013 to September 3, 2013 in Venezuela on Televen.
