= Sebastián Ferrat =

Mexican actor (1978–2019)

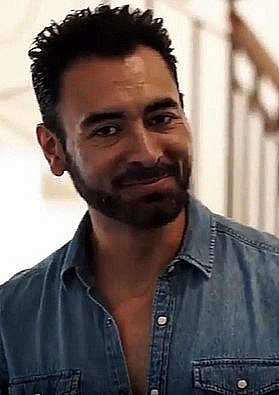
- Ferrat in 2018
- Born: Roberto González López; 17 September 1978; Mexicali, Mexico
- Died: 29 December 2019 (aged 41)
- Occupation: Actor
- Years active: 2006–2019

Roberto González López (17 September 1978 – 29 December 2019) artistically known as Sebastián Ferrat, was a Mexican television actor, and stage actor.

== Life ==
Ferrat was born in Mexicali, Baja California, Mexico. He studied acting and dramaturgy at the Televisa Centro de Educación Artística from which he left in 2005.

He is best known for his roles in various telenovelas for Televisión Azteca and Telemundo. Ferrat became known mostly for his character Juan Antonio Marcado in the third and fourth season of the Telemundo crime drama series El Señor de los Cielos (2015–2016).

In October 2019 it was confirmed that Ferrat acquired an illness called Cysticercosis from eating contaminated food with tapeworm eggs which are usually found in feces of tapeworm carriers. Ferrat died two months later on 29 December as a result of the illness.

== Filmography ==
=== Stage roles ===
Year	Title	Notes
2004	Marionetas del pene	
2004	Tres más 1	
2010	Se busca marido	Author, director and producer
2011	Ya mátame por favor	Author, director and producer

=== Television roles ===
Year	Title	Roles	Notes
2006	Montecristo	Camilo	
2007	Se busca un hombre	Richard	
2009	Pasión morena	Gerad Pignon	
2010	Drenaje profundo	Actor	Episode: "Ratas"
2011–2012	Amar de nuevo	Johnny C	
2014	Reina de corazones	Christian Palacios	Recurring role; 123 episodes
2015–2016	El Señor de los Cielos	Juan Antonio Marcado	Series regular (seasons 3–4); 92 episodes
2016	Ruta 35	Calixto	
2016–2017	El Vato	Filiberto Cisneros	Series regular (seasons 1–2); 20 episodes
2018	La bella y las bestias	Ignacio Vega "El Cafetero"	Series regular; 28 episodes
2018–2019	Las Buchonas	Celestino	Series regular; 24 episodes
2019	Yankee	Carasucia	Series regular (season 1); 25 episodes
