= El Señor de los Cielos season 1 =

El Señor de los Cielos
- Season 1
- El Señor de los Cielos season 1 poster
- Starring: Rafael Amaya; Ximena Herrera; Robinson Díaz; Raúl Méndez; Gabriel Porras
- No. of episodes: 74

Release
- Original network: Telemundo
- Original release: April 15 – August 5, 2013

Season chronology
- Next → Season 2

The first season of the American television series El Señor de los Cielos, was developed by Telemundo, it premiered on April 15, 2013 and ended on August 5, 2013. The Show was broadcast from Monday to Friday in the time of 10 pm/9c. The season consisted of 74 episodes and it premiered with a total of 2.34 million viewers and ended with a total of 3.62 million viewers becoming the most watched series on Telemundo.

The season is starred by Rafael Amaya as Aurelio Casillas – A drug lord who is recognized for knowing how to transfer drug substances to Mexico, Colombia, and the United States, along with Ximena Herrera, Robinson Díaz, Raúl Méndez and Gabriel Porras.

== Plot ==
The season follows the life of Aurelio Casillas (Rafael Amaya), a drug lord who is recognized for knowing how to transfer drug substances to Mexico, Colombia, and the United States. Aurelio and his wife Ximena (Ximena Herrera) have three children, Rutila (Carmen Aub), Heriberto (Ruy Senderos), and Luz Marina (Gala Montes). He also has his faithful brother Chacorta (Raúl Méndez) who helps him in all his illicit businesses. Aurelio would end up being cornered by the authorities after being found as he decides to undergo a face operation in which he supposedly dies, thus causing his empire of power to fall.

== Cast ==
=== Main ===
- Rafael Amaya as Aurelio Casillas
- Ximena Herrera as Ximena Letrán
- Robinson Díaz as Miltón Jiménez / El Cabo
- Raúl Méndez as Víctor Casillas / Chacorta
- Gabriel Porras as Marco Mejía

=== Recurring ===
- Andrés Parra as Pablo Escobar
- Carmen Villalobos as Leonor Ballesteros
- Fernanda Castillo as Mónica Robles
- Sara Corrales as Matilde Rojas
- Fernando Solórzano as Óscar Cadena
- Arturo Barba as Alí Benjumea / El Turco
- Lisa Owen as Doña Alba Casillas
- Juan Ríos Cantú as General Daniel Jiménez Arroyo / El Letrudo
- Angélica Celaya as Eugenia Casas
- Marco Pérez as Guadalupe Robles
- Tommy Vásquez as Álvaro José Pérez / El Tijeras
- Fabián Peña as Jesús Linares
- Emmanuel Orenday as Gregorio Ponte
- Ruy Senderos as Heriberto Casillas
- Bianca Calderón as Roxana Mondragón
- Ángel Cerlo as General Castro
- Arnoldo Picazzo as Flavio Huerta
- Juan Ignacio Aranda as Ramiro Silva de la Garza
- Jorge Zárate as Juan Montoya
- Javier Díaz Dueñas as Don Anacleto "Cleto" Letrán
- Rodrigo Abed as César Silva de la Garza, President of Mexico
- Roberto Uscanga as Arturo Benitez, later becomes President of Mexico
- Terina Suarez Murias as Rutila Casillas

== Episodes ==
No. overall	No. in season	Title	Original release date
1	1	"Arranca la balacera"	April 15, 2013
Detective Mejía organizes the manhunt for Aurelio as the firefights rage on. Although he's a womanizer, Aurelio shows that he loves his family.
2	2	"Aurelio traiciona a Pablo"	April 16, 2013
Aurelio looks for a way to avoid a fatal destiny like that of other famous drug traffickers.
3	3	"Cayó el narco"	April 17, 2013
Aurelio is captured by Mejia, a situation that unleashes a series of unsuspected consequences.
4	4	"¡Se salvó!"	April 18, 2013
Some of Aurelio's inmates decide to kill him. Ximena and her children are traveling by car, but someone plans to put a tragic end to their journey.
5	5	"¡Cásate conmigo!"	April 19, 2013
Ximena calls Aurelio on the phone and says that they are all well. Don Cleto tells Alba that Ximena and the children survived the explosion.
6	6	"La boda del año"	April 22, 2013
The day of the wedding of Ximena and Aurelio arrives. El Norteño discovers that there is a plan to attack Ximena and that they want to hunt the Jaibo.
7	7	"Murió envenenado"	April 23, 2013
Aurelio tells Isidro that he knows that it was he who put the bomb in the car in which Ximena and the children traveled.
8	8	"Soy el rey"	April 24, 2013
Guadalupe does not believe that his brother Isidro has died of a heart attack; Is sure that Aurelio has had something to do.
9	9	"Pacto de narcos"	April 26, 2013
Aurelio tells El Cabo that he goes with them to Colombia; Guadalupe and Mónica also appear; Jiménez wants to watch Mejia and his girlfriend.
10	10	"Rescate suicida"	April 29, 2013
Aurelio is furious when Guadalupe does not let him help her to rescue Mónica. El Cabo tells Aurelio that the situation is getting out of hand.
11	11	"¡Qué tentación!"	April 30, 2013
Jairo is planning to eliminate El Cabo, but Aurelio will avoid it. Eugenia tells Linares that she is worried about the article she has written in the newspaper.
12	12	"Estoy embarazada"	May 1, 2013
Aurelio buys a 727 to transport drugs. He sends drugs on a plane and he travels with his men in another just in case.
13	13	"¡La pagarás!"	May 2, 2013
Chacorta approaches the recording studio to see how Matilde is doing with the song on the record. El Cabo asks Aurelio who is Letrudo.
14	14	"Los secuestraron"	May 3, 2013
Doris tells Ema that they tried to kidnap her but that, thank God, managed to escape. El Tijeras tells Guadalupe that Aurelio has got the drugs.
15	15	"¡Lo liberaron!"	May 6, 2013
Óscar forces Dobladillo to talk on the phone with Canica. Canica tells him where to find Commander Macario, who has Aurelio prisoner.
16	16	"Celos que matan"	May 7, 2013
Mónica coldly receives the new pilot who has hired Aurelio. Ximena catches Heriberto smoking marijuana with Matilde.
17	17	"¡No te mueras!"	May 8, 2013
El Turco tells Colonel Jiménez that a new shipment from Colombia will arrive and gives him a photo of Pombo, the man they are looking for.
18	18	"Aprovéchate de mí"	May 9, 2013
Roxana asks Guadalupe for money, who takes advantage of the situation and rapes her. Colonel Jiménez tells Doris about his promotion.
19	19	"Un cuadro de millones"	May 10, 2013
Chacorta probes the situation to sell drugs in a new area, talks to Aurelio and tells him that the business is going very well.
20	20	"Las narcotiendas"	May 13, 2013
Irina tells Aurelio that she can not contact the president, only with her cousin. Chacorta continues with his narcotics project.
21	21	"La primera sospecha"	May 14, 2013
Marco tells Jiménez that they have to dismantle the distribution network in the neighborhoods of Casillas. Los Villalobos want a meeting with Aurelio.
22	22	"La foto de Casillas"	May 15, 2013
Mónica gets furious because Aurelio does not pick up the phone and Ponte tells Marco Mejia that his men are ready to leave.
23	23	"En los titulares"	May 16, 2013
Jiménez gives the green light to go by Aurelio Casillas, and Marco Mejia begins an operation to dismantle the organization of the Casillas.
24	24	"Fuera del negocio"	May 17, 2013
Los Villalobos discover the situation of Aurelio Casillas and decide to seize the opportunity to eliminate him of the business.
25	25	"Aquí tiene mi renuncia"	May 20, 2013
Marco Mejía tries to intercept the communications of the Casillas. Ramiro tells Aurelio that the journalist who goes for him is Eugenia, Marco's wife.
26	26	"Tentaciones peligrosas"	May 21, 2013
Matilde goes to bed with Heriberto. Chacorta tries to kill Eugenia. Marco Mejía and Chacorta were torn by gunfire.
27	27	"Todo por venganza"	May 22, 2013
Doña Alba delivers the documents of a new site for the school so that Rutila returns and returns to the studies.
28	28	"Secuestrada"	May 23, 2013
Aurelio and Monica meet again. After the appointment of Benítez, Doris proposes to Jiménez that they organize a celebration for the high officials of the government.
29	29	"Quién es el infiltrado"	May 24, 2013
Juan Villalobos tells Ximena that they have learned of the relationship of Heriberto and Matilde. Sonia accidentally hears the conversation between Ramiro and Irina and decides to intervene.
30	30	"Cuídate la espalda"	May 27, 2013
El Cabo visits Aurelio to tell him that someone wants to kick him out of the business. He asks her to help him rescue Ximena.
31	31	"Principales sospechosos"	May 28, 2013
Sonia threatens Ramiro telling him that he will tell everything during the meeting, but Ramiro tells him that if he does, he will regret it.
32	32	"El expediente"	May 29, 2013
The president asks Marco Mejia to give him a list with the names of all government officials suspected of being in the drug business.
33	33	"La amante de tu hijo"	May 30, 2013
Sonia asks a priest for an appointment with the cardinal to confess something terrible. Matilde faces Chacorta for having a baby with Aida.
34	34	"Me las pagarás"	May 31, 2013
El Cabo and El Tijeras take control of the organization of Óscar Cadena and deliver it to the police. Aurelio visits the Villalobos and takes a surprise.
35	35	"La libreta"	June 3, 2013
Sonia meets with the cardinal to show him the evidence that Ramiro is involved in drug trafficking. Leonor and Marco Mejia spend the night together.
36	36	"Choque con criminales"	June 5, 2013
Marco Mejia convinces Jiménez that he no longer wants to continue working with Leonor. She enters the recording studio posing as an admirer of Alejo.
37	37	"Fuera del camino"	June 6, 2013
Marco returns home to pick up his things and tries to talk to Eugenia, but she refuses to listen and throws him.
38	38	"Nexos con el narcotráfico"	June 10, 2013
El Turco convinces Topo Galván to help Aurelio convince the Villalobos. Linares is discharged from the hospital.
39	39	"Sumando muertes"	June 11, 2013
Matilde promises Alba a considerable amount of money and the child, since he is the son of Chacorta. Aurelio tells Guadalupe to get rid of the cardinal.
40	40	"Algo está cambiando"	June 12, 2013
Alfonso authorizes the unchanged publication of Eugenia's article on the death of the cardinal.
41	41	"Nuevo romance"	June 13, 2013
Marco Mejia goes to Ramiro's office and asks for Sonia. Ramiro tells him that he is in London with his daughter. Aurelio meets Leonor and flirts with her.
42	42	"Déjame escapar"	June 14, 2013
Ximena asks Aurelio if it had anything to do with the death of the cardinal. Aurelio promises to change.
43	43	"No me veas la cara"	June 17, 2013
Monica regrets to have hit El Triste and apologizes, and says that Aurelio will never see her again. Ximena visits Cleto.
44	44	"Esta vida no es para mí"	June 18, 2013
Aurelio informs El Cabo and El Tijeras that they leave the territory of Robles and Villalobos. Cleto, for his part, is concerned about the cargo.
45	45	"Confesión de amor"	June 19, 2013
Leonor drugged Alejandro so he would not deal with her. Ximena is thinking of leaving Aurelio, and this one finds with the empty bed when waking up.
46	46	"En busca de Ximena"	June 20, 2013
Aurelio asks his men to stop him and start looking for Ximena. Topo Galván proposes that they join Óscar Cadena.
47	47	"El regreso"	June 21, 2013
Benitez thanks General Jiménez for having arrested Don Cleto, and says that the drug cartels have received a heavy blow.
48	48	"Golpe al alma"	June 24, 2013
Aurelio hits Ximena and tells him that he can not leave the house without his permission. Leonor is afraid that Aurelio has found his gun.
49	49	"Tiempos de infarto"	June 25, 2013
Cabo is depressed by what happened to Mónica. Víctor forces Matilde. El Pollo says to El Topo Galván that Don Cleto has suffered a heart attack.
50	50	"Provocadora"	June 26, 2013
Ponte and Orejas discover that Letrudo is General Jiménez. Leonor tells Marco Mejía that General Jiménez was at Casillas Ranch.
51	51	"Contrarreloj"	June 27, 2013
El Turco tells Aurelio that he has the plans of the hospital, but that he does not believe that they will be able to free Don Cleto without losing some men.
52	52	"La traición"	June 28, 2013
Aurelio confronts Don Cleto for betraying him by attempting to ally himself with the Topo Galván. Don Cleto denies it. Doris asks Jiménez to get rid of Marco.
53	53	"Encrucijada"	July 1, 2013
Marco Mejía shows Benítez, the lawyer, the recording of General Jiménez making deals with Aurelio Casillas.
54	54	"Los dueños del mundo"	July 2, 2013
Marco Mejia tells Eugenia and Alfonso that they have confirmed that Jiménez Arroyo is the government's contact with the traffickers. Leonor visits Ponte at the clinic.
55	55	"Tras los pasos de Casillas"	July 3, 2013
Topo Galván tells El Pollo that he intends to ally himself with Mónica because he is going to need his Colombian contacts. El Turco speaks to Randy.
56	56	"La boca bien cerrada"	July 8, 2013
General Jiménez tells Marco that he is willing to speak, but only with the judge assigned to him and on the condition that they grant Doris immunity.
57	57	"Muerta de los celos"	July 10, 2013
Alba warns Heriberto that if he follows the tracks of Aurelio can end up fatal. Aurelio has to confess something to Mónica.
58	58	"La amenaza"	July 11, 2013
Eugenia asks Vanesa for Alejandro Negrete and Vanesa tells him that she was with him at the Casillas ranch during a curfew.
59	59	"No diga nada"	July 12, 2013
Aurelio kidnaps Eugenia and takes her to a warehouse. Heriberto is very upset by the article published in the newspaper about the disappearance of Alejandro.
60	60	"Prisionera en mi casa"	July 15, 2013
Alfonso goes to look for Eugenia and finds something incredible. El Turco tells Ximena that Heriberto had nothing to do with Alejandro disappearance.
61	61	"La culpa es de ella"	July 16, 2013
Chacorta warns El Turco to be careful with Aurelio, because he is a ruthless murderer capable of anything.
62	62	"La fuga"	July 17, 2013
Aurelio escapes from the security building. Ochoa finds a warehouse full of cocaine. Ponte finds a computer. Leonor finds a room full of documents.
63	63	"Camino a la verdad"	July 18, 2013
Aurelio arrives to the hotel where Monica is staying. Turco asks Chacorta to get rid of the body of Miss Sinaloa, because Marco Mejia is on the way.
64	64	"El nombre del padre"	July 19, 2013
Marco Mejía gives him the report of the autopsy of Cleto Letrán to Ximena and affirms that he is convinced that his murderer was Aurelio Casillas.
65	65	"Finalmente juntos"	July 22, 2013
Ximena appears in El Turco's room and tells him that she wants to sleep with him. Parra tries to kill Leonor.
66	66	"Secuestrados"	July 23, 2013
El Cabo kills the cousin of El Tijeras in front of Aurelio Casillas. Leonor tells Ponte that they should investigate El Turco, the right hand of Aurelio.
67	67	"Complot"	July 24, 2013
Matilde and Heriberto are kidnapped. Aurelio learns that El Cabo wanted to get rid of him, so he invites him to San Luis Potosí to kill Colmenares.
68	68	"Los platos rotos"	July 25, 2013
El Turco appears just in time to save El Cabo, delivers the results of DNA tests to Aurelio Tijeras and tells him that he has the loyalty of El Cabo.
69	69	"Sin mí te mueres"	July 26, 2013
Marco Mejía asks Benítez not to pass on to the president his suspicions that someone from the government is involved in the murder of Colmenares.
70	70	"Furioso y en la mira"	July 29, 2013
Chacorta takes Matilde to the hospital. Heriberto is upset. President Benitez tells Marco Mejía that he has his help and that he will not negotiate with criminals.
71	71	"Dura balacera"	July 30, 2013
Aurelio invites Ximena to dinner. El Cabo and his men arrive at the restaurant where Aurelio is eating and a firefight is fired.
72	72	"Volver a empezar"	August 1, 2013
Aurelio tries to get Ximena out of the country by force, but she manages to disarm a man from Aurelio and they arrive at a dead center.
73	73	"Una nueva cara"	August 2, 2013
El Cabo tells Irina that she is looking for Aurelio Casillas. Aurelio returns to Mexico and tells Irina that he is thinking of going back to business.
74	74	"Vivo o muerto"	August 5, 2013
Rutila has to lie to Ximena for fear of El Turco and tells her that she misses her father. Aurelio enters the hospital to undergo cosmetic surgery.
