= Caborca Cartel =

Mexican criminal organization

- Cártel de Caborca
- Founded: 2019
- Founded by: Rafael Caro Quintero and Miguel Caro Quintero
- Named after: Caborca, Sonora
- Years active: 2019−present
- Territory: Sonora; Chihuahua; Baja California Sur; Quintana Roo; Yucatán
- Ethnicity: Mexican
- Criminal activities: Drug trafficking, money laundering, extortion, robbery, murder, arms trafficking
- Allies: Juárez Cartel; Jalisco New Generation Cartel
- Rivals: Mexico; United States; Sinaloa Cartel

The Caborca Cartel (Spanish: Cártel de Caborca) is a Mexican criminal organization commanded by the veteran drug lord Rafael Caro Quintero, (founder of the defunct Guadalajara Cartel) and concentrating its drug trafficking operations in the border area of Caborca Municipality. At present, the group has a bloody dispute with the Los Salazar criminal cell, identified as the armed wing of the Sinaloa Cartel. The group allied with the Juárez Cartel to dispute the areas of Sonora and Chihuahua, having regrouped their forces and deciding to dispute the territory of his former partner Joaquín "El Chapo" Guzmán.

Mexican cartel headquarters

== History ==
According to the Secretariat of the Navy, it warned of the growing conflict between the criminal cells of Los Páez (led by Rodrigo Páez Quintero, nephew of Rafael Caro Quintero) and Los Cazadores, as well as Los Salazar (cells related to the Sinaloa Cartel), causing an increase in intentional homicides in the state of Sonora. Since the beginning of 2020, various drug messages attributed to the Caborca Cartel were commonly left after armed confrontations, stating that Caro Quintero comes through the territories that "belong to him." It wasn't until January 2021 when federal intelligence sources confirmed that Caro Quintero runs the cartel. They also mention that the main objective of Caro Quintero has been to dispute the territory of Sonora with the faction of Los Chapitos and Los Salazar, led by the sons of Guzmán.

On 15 July 2022, Caro Quintero was captured by Mexican authorities in San Simón, a settlement within the Choix Municipality of Sinaloa. Despite the capture, some media mention that the operation was too celebrated and oversized, taking into account that the cartel's participation is local, unlike more established cartels such as the Juárez Cartel or the Sinaloa Cartel.

It was not until 30 April of the following year that Rodrigo Omar alias "El R" was arrested in an operation carried out by elements of the Fiscalía General de la República and Secretariat of the Navy in the Guadalajara metropolitan area.

== See also ==
- Independent Cartel of Sonora
