= Irineo Álvarez =

Mexican film and television actor (born 1967)

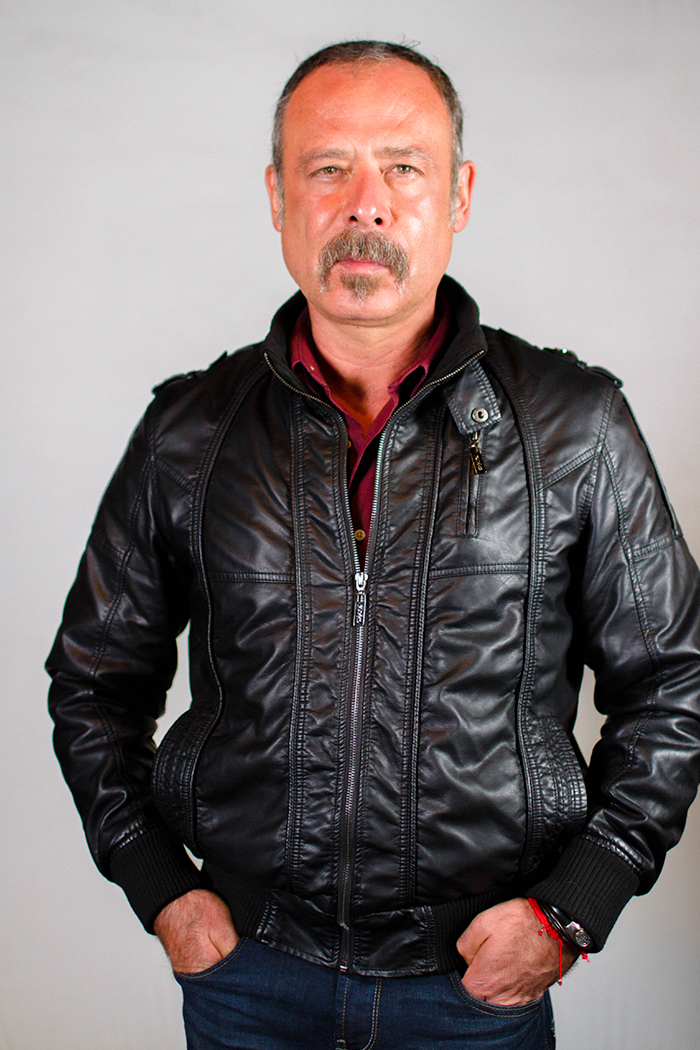
- Born: 7 November 1967 (age 58); Guadalupe de Ures, Sonora, Mexico
- Occupation: Actor
- Years active: 2003–present

Irineo Álvarez (born 7 November 1967 in Guadalupe de Ures, Sonora, Mexico), is a Mexican film and television actor. He is best known for his notable films Bordertown and Chapo: el escape del siglo. In television he was made known in the telenovela La Patrona.

== Filmography ==
=== Film roles ===
Year	Title	Role	Notes
2004	Juegos polimpicos	Citius	Short film
2005	Los tres entierros de Melquiades Estrada	Manuel	
2006	Bordertown	Domingo Esparza	
2007	La misma luna	Señor Doblado	
2009	El hijo de Judas	Gitano	
2010	Flor de fango	Comandante	
2013	Ladies Nice	Tuerto	
2016	Chapo: el escape del siglo	Joaquín "El Chapo" Guzmán	
2019	Powder	Tano	

=== Television roles ===
Year	Title	Role	Notes
2003	Ladrón de corazones	Secretario	Guest role
2009	Mujer comprada	Comandante	Recurring role
2010	Drenaje profundo	El Guapo Guzmán	Episode: "La Pasión de Santa Cruz"
2011	El encanto del águila	Rodolfo Herrero	Episode: "De la Constitución a la Rebelión"
2012	La ruta blanca	Félix	Recurring role
2012	Rosa Diamante	Fiscal Gustavo Manrique	Episode: "Culpa inocente"
2012	Capadocia	General Vega	Recurring role; 13 episodes (season 3)
2013	La Patrona	Ramón Izquierdo	Recurring role; 44 episodes (season 1)
2013	Fortuna	Víctor Arteaga	1 episode (season 1)
2013	Las trampas del deseo	Comandante Sergio	1 episode (season 1)
2014	El Señor de los Cielos	Pedro Navárez	Recurring role; 22 episodes (season 2)
2016	La Hermandad	Juan Jacinto Arias	Episode: "El regreso"
2016	Yago	Unknown role	7 episodes
2016–2017	La candidata	Larreta	Recurring role; 23 episodes (season 1)
2017	Su nombre era Dolores, la Jenn que yo conocí	Ed Núñez	Episode: "Purgatorio"
2017	El Vato	Justino Robles	2 episodes
2017–2018	Caer en tentación	Antonio	Recurring role
2018–2019	Las Buchonas	Mariano	
2018	El secreto de Selena	Arnold García	Recurring role; 8 episodes
