= Sandra Díaz (actress) =

Venezuelan actress and model

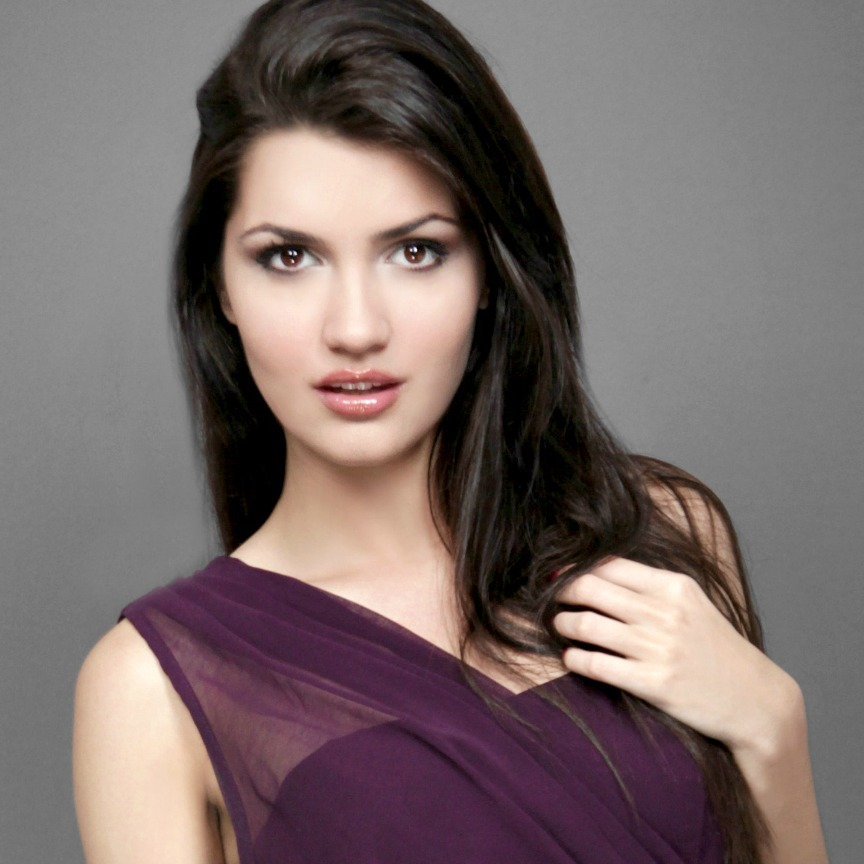
- Born: Caracas, Venezuela
- Occupations: Actress; model

Sandra Díaz is a Venezuelan actress and model.

== Career ==
Díaz first appeared on television at the age of 10, in the children's program of Televen Taima. At 16, she was cast to participate in the telenovela RCTV La trepadora and went to France. In 2009 she was in Calle luna, Calle sol as Valerie Hidalgo Arriaga. From 2012, she recorded Nacer contigo, the first soap opera in high definition made in Venezuela. In 2013, she participated in Las Bandidas, a telenovela produced by RCTV and Televisa. In 2014, she joined the recurring cast of the television series El Señor de los Cielos, produced by Telemundo.

== Filmography ==
Year	Title	Character	Notes
2008	La trepadora	Francia	Antagonist
2009	Calle luna, Calle sol	Valerie Hidalgo Arriaga	Supporting role
2010	Que el cielo me explique	Mayté Sanabria	Supporting role
2011	La Banda	Suxy	Supporting role
2012	Nacer contigo	Areusa Rodríguez	Supporting role
2013	Las Bandidas	Betsabe	Supporting role
2014-2015	El Señor de los Cielos	Irma Sofía Veracierta	Season 2 (recurring; 42 episodes); Season 3 (recurring; 16 episodes)
