= The Cry of the Butterflies =

Spanish-Argentine television series

- El grito de las mariposas
- Genre: Drama
- Created by: Juan Pablo Buscarini
- Directed by: Mariano Hueter; Leandro Ipiña; Inés París
- Starring: Sandy Hernández; Susana Abaitua; Luis Alberto García; Camila Issa; Alejandra Borrero; Biassini Segura; Sergio Borrero
- Countries of origin: Spain; Argentina; Colombia
- Original language: Spanish
- No. of seasons: 1
- No. of episodes: 13

Production
- Production location: Colombia
- Production companies: Gloriamundi Producciones; Tandem Films; Mediabyte

Original release
- Network: Star+
- Release: 8 March 2023

The Cry of the Butterflies (Spanish: El grito de las mariposas) is a Spanish-Colombian television series created by Juan Pablo Buscarini set in the Dominican Republic, during Rafael Trujillo's dictatorship. It was released in Latin America by Star+, whereas Filmax handled the rest of international sales.

== Premise ==
Set in the 1950s Dominican Republic, during the dictatorship of Rafael Leónidas Trujillo, the fiction focuses on the relationship between idealist Minerva Mirabal, one of the Mirabal sisters, and Arantxa Oyamburu, a Spanish immigrant.

== Cast ==
- Sandy Hernández as Minerva Mirabal
- Camila Issa as María Teresa Mirabal
- Susana Abaitua as Arantxa Oyamburu
- Essined Aponte as Dedé Mirabal
- Luis Alberto García as Rafael Leónidas Trujillo
- Alina Robert as Patria Mirabal
- Mario Espitia as Pedro González
- Sergio Borrero as Protocol Host
- Freddy Beltrán as Juan Ramón Sáenz
- Alejandra Borrero as Gretchen
- Belén Rueda as Pilar Macías
- Mercedes San Pietro as Arantxa Oyamburu
- Willy Toledo as Asier Oyamburu
- Felipe Valencia as Pierre

== Production ==
Created by showrunner Juan Pablo Buscarini, The Cry of the Butterflies is produced by Gloriamundi Producciones, Tandem Films, Debut y Despedida and Mediabyte. directing credits include Mariano Hueter, Leandro Ipiña and Inés París. The writing team consists of Azucena Rodríguez, Ricardo Rodríguez, Juan Pablo Buscarini, Juan Carballo, Gabriel Nicoli and Pablo E. Bossi.

Consisting of 13 episodes, filming in Colombia was reported to have begun by August 2021.
