= Celines Toribio =

Dominican Republic actress

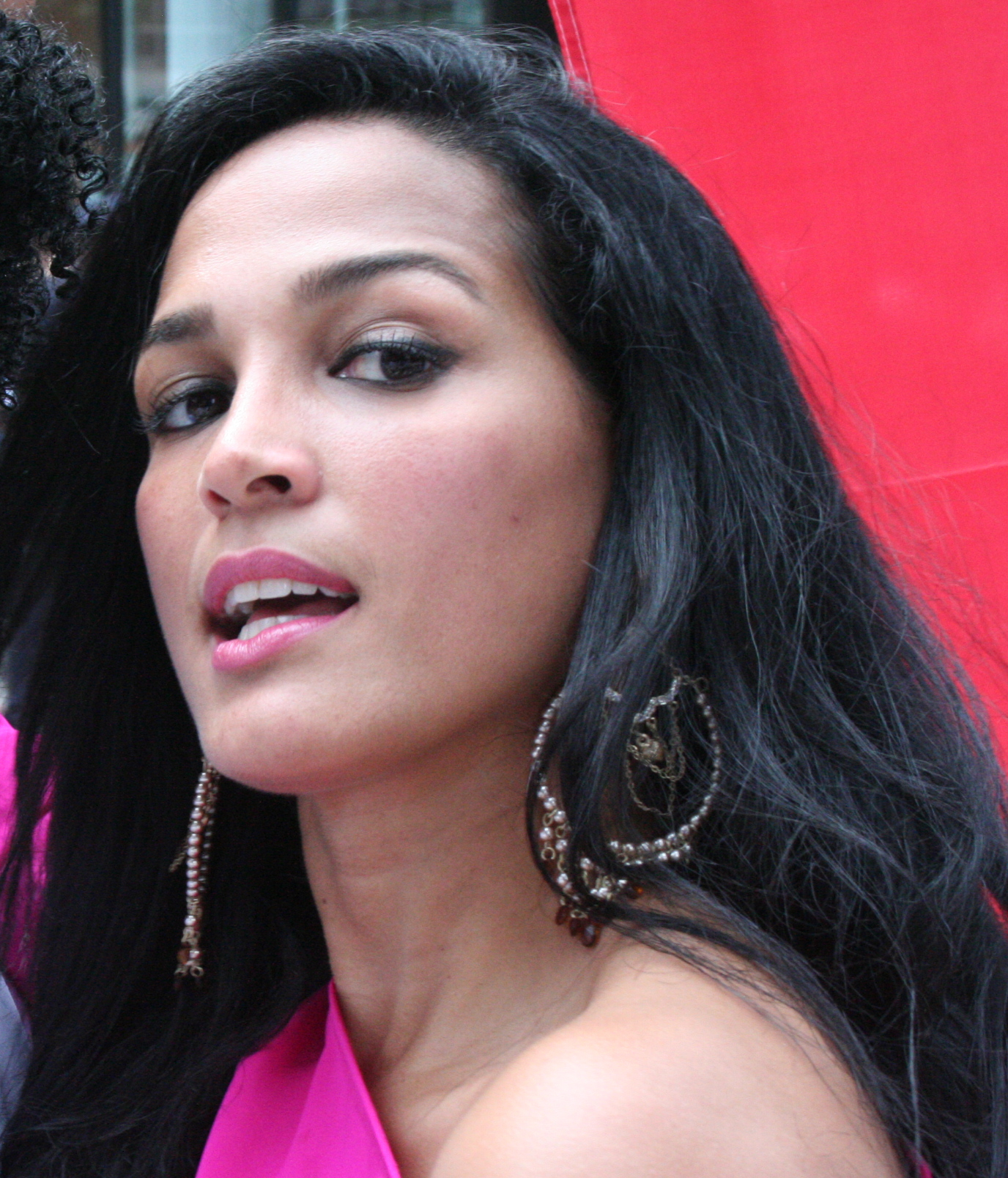
- Celinés at the Dominican Parade NYC 2009.
- Born: Celines Toribio; Santo Domingo, Dominican Republic
- Occupations: Actress, Host
- Website: www.celinestoribio.net

Celines Toribio is a Dominican actress, model, and Spanish-speaking television personality.

== Biography ==
Toribio was born in Santo Domingo, Dominican Republic. In 1975 ? she graduated from Lehman College with a Bachelor's degree in Mass Communications and a Minor in Theater. She moved to Los Angeles in 2006 to pursue acting and currently studies with Arthur Mendoza, an acting coach who has worked with Salma Hayek, Benicio del Toro, and Laurence Fishburne.

== Career ==
Celines Toribio is managed by Giancarlo Chersich.

=== Hosting ===
Toribio began her television career in 1995 as host of the variety and entertainment program Sabado Al Mediodia (Saturday at Midday), alongside Cuban entertainer Luis Velasco and was also a featured as an entertainment reporter on WXTV's local newscast as the host of Galeria (Gallery), a daily live gossip and entertainment segment, and Mi Gente (My People), a weekly segment that profiled and interviewed famous Latino personalities. During Toribio's tenure at WXTV, she made several appearances at local Latino events such as the Puerto Rican Day Parade and the Dominican Day Parade.

In 1997, Toribio received national exposure on Univision, one of the nation's two major Spanish-language television networks, as the on-air host for the network's coverage of Miami's Calle Ocho street festival, Little Havana. Later, she became a reporter for Univision's weekly primetime Fuera De Serie (Something Outrageous), and an entertainment reporter for El Gordo y La Flaca (Fat and Skinny), the network's daily entertainment news and gossip show. During her career she has interviewed many major Latino celebrities including Ricky Martin, Luis Miguel, Celia Cruz, and Michelle Rodriguez among many others. From 2002 to 2006, Toribio was the host of a Major League Baseball show on ESPN Deportes called Sabor a Beisbol. Fox Sports is featuring her in their September television special about Latinos in Baseball. She is the only woman that ever hosted a Major League Baseball-produced television show. She also spent time as a co-host of the Spanish language morning radio program in New York called Coco y Celines de 6 AM-10 AM.

On September 13, 2008, she was the host of FIESTA 2008, a major Latino concert at Central Park summer stage in New York presented by People en Español and sponsored by ABC, Maybelline, and Verizon.

On August 31, 2020, she was a guest co-host on Telemundo's daily morning show " Un Nuevo Día. "

=== Acting ===
Toribio appeared in El hijo del carnicero (The Butcher’s Son) opposite Manny Pérez. In June 2008, she worked with Vin Diesel in a short film which is part of Fast & Furious.

She also starred opposite Michelle Rodriguez in the historical film Trópico de Sangre which debuted in the New York International Latino Film Festival on July 29, 2010. In the film, she portrays Dedé Mirabal.

=== Modeling ===
Toribio has been featured in major print publications such as the New York Post, Stuff Magazine, El Diario la Prensa, The Source Magazine, and Listín Diario.

== Filmography ==
Year	Film	Role	Notes
2005	Los Locos Tambien Piensan	Alexandra	
2008	Shoe Crazy		
2009	The Butcher's Son	President's assistant	aka La Soga - Dominican Republic (original title). Also appears as producer.
2010	Trópico de Sangre	Dedé Mirabal	
2017	Colao	Maribel	
2023	Unhappily Ever After	Chamana	

=== Notable rankings ===
Toribio was selected by fans in the US and Latin America as one of People en Español's "50 Mas Bellos" (Most Beautiful).

== Personal life ==
Toribio married her manager Giancarlo Chersich in 2009 and got divorced. Chersich proposed in May 2008 in Cannes, France.

Toribio has an academy in the Bronx, New York where her staff teaches modeling, acting, and dance.
