= Ventanarosa =

American film and television production company

- Type: Private
- Industry: Films and television
- Founded: January 24, 1999; 27 years ago
- Founder: Salma Hayek
- Headquarters: 9255 Sunset Blvd, Suite 1100, West Hollywood, Los Angeles, California, United States
- Key people: Salma Hayek (chairwoman and CEO)
- Products: El Coronel No Tiene Quien Le Escriba; In the Time of the Butterflies; Frida; Ugly Betty; Monarca; The Prophet
- Owner: Salma Hayek

Ventanarosa (ventana rosa being Spanish for 'pink window') is an American film and television production company formally founded by Salma Hayek in 1999 and run by Hayek and her production partner, Jose Tamez. Siobhan Flynn serves as its Head of Development and Production.

== History ==
In 1999, Ventanarosa released its first feature film, El Coronel No Tiene Quien Le Escriba, based on the Gabriel García Márquez novel of the same name. The film was Mexico's official submission to the Best Foreign Film category at the Academy Awards and was directed by Arturo Ripstein.

In 2001, Ventanarosa released the Showtime original movie In the Time of the Butterflies, an adaptation of Julia Alvarez's novel by the same title, about the real life story of Minerva Mirabel and her sisters’ fight against the Rafael Trujillo regime. The film starred Hayek, Marc Anthony, Edward James Olmos, and Demián Bichir. Hayek and Anthony both received ALMA Award nominations for the film; Hayek took home the award for Outstanding Actor/Actress in a Made for Television Movie or Miniseries.

The next year, Frida, a film Hayek started developing in 1997, was released in theaters. Frida received six Academy Award nominations, including Best Actress in a Leading Role for Hayek. She was the first Mexican actress ever to be nominated for the category. The film went on to win two Academy Awards for Best Original Score and Best Makeup.

In 2003, Ventanarosa released The Maldonado Miracle, another movie made for Showtime and Hayek’s directorial debut. The film follows a young Mexican boy in the United States who accidentally manufactures a miracle in his small town, inspiring an unexpected economic boom. The film received four Daytime Emmy nominations. Hayek went on to win the Award for Outstanding Directing In A Children/Youth/Family Special. The film also won the WGA Award for Children’s Script and the Young Artist Award for Best Family Television Movie or Special.

Ventanarosa partnered with Reveille Productions to adapt the Colombian telenovela, Yo Soy Betty La Fea, for the United States in 2004. The US adaptation, Ugly Betty, became an instant success at ABC, where it aired from 2006 to 2010. It won multiple awards, including Emmy wins for America Ferrera for Outstanding Lead Actress in a Comedy Series, the 2007 Peabody Award, and two Golden Globes for Best Comedic Television Series and Best Performance by an Actress in a Comedy Television Series.

In 2014, Ventanarosa released Kahlil Gibran's The Prophet, an animated feature film based on the 1923 novel of the same name. In addition to producing, Hayek lent her voice to the film. The voice cast also included Liam Neeson, Alfred Molina, John Krasinski, Frank Langella, John Rhys-Davies, and Quvenzhané Wallis. Nine different directors are credited for the film, including Paul and Gaëtan Brizzi, Joan C. Gratz, Mohammed Saeed Harib, Tomm Moore, Nina Paley, Bill Plympton, Joann Sfar and Michal Socha. Each one gave life to a different poem within the general narrative of the film. Animation writer-director Roger Allers supervised and wrote the film. It was released in the United States on August 7, 2015, by GKIDS and was nominated for three Annie Awards, including Best Independent Animated Feature.

In 2019, Netflix released Monarca, a drama series set in Mexico about a powerful family that runs a tequila empire. It was produced by Ventanarosa, Lemon Studios, and Stearns Castle. The series was released on September 13, 2019, and ran for two seasons. It won the PRODU award for Best Drama Series in 2021.

In 2022, Ventanarosa and Disney’s Buena Vista Original Productions released a TV adaptation of Tomás Eloy Martínez’s 1995 novel, Santa Evita, which chronicles the real life mystery surrounding the corpse of Eva Perón. The limited series was directed by Rodrigo Garcia and Alejandro Maci. It premiered on July 22, 2022, on Star+ in Latin America and Hulu in the United States. It was nominated for twelve PRODU awards and went on to win six, including Best Adapted Series, Best Script, Best Cinematography, Best Musical Composition, Best Period Recreation, and the Grand Prize for Fiction (El Gran Premio de Ficción.)

== Upcoming projects ==
In 2021, Ventanarosa and HBO announced the development on a TV adaptation of Valentine, a novel by Elizabeth Wetmore. The series, set in 1976 in a West Texas oilfield town, will follow the lives of a network of women whose lives all change when a 14-year-old Mexican girl is beaten and assaulted by a white oil-worker. Jennifer Schuur is attached to showrun.

In 2022, Ventanarosa announced production of Quiero Tu Vida, a romantic fantasy set in the world of professional soccer for TelevisaUnivision’s streaming service, Vix+.

The same year, Ventanarosa and Netflix announced a feature adaptation of Kotaro Isaka’s novel of the same name, Seesaw Monster, set to star Anne Hathaway and Salma Hayek as rivals forced to work together. Hayek and Hathaway will produce alongside Akiva Goldsman and Gregory Lessans.
