= Sergio Carlo =

Dominican actor (born 1977)

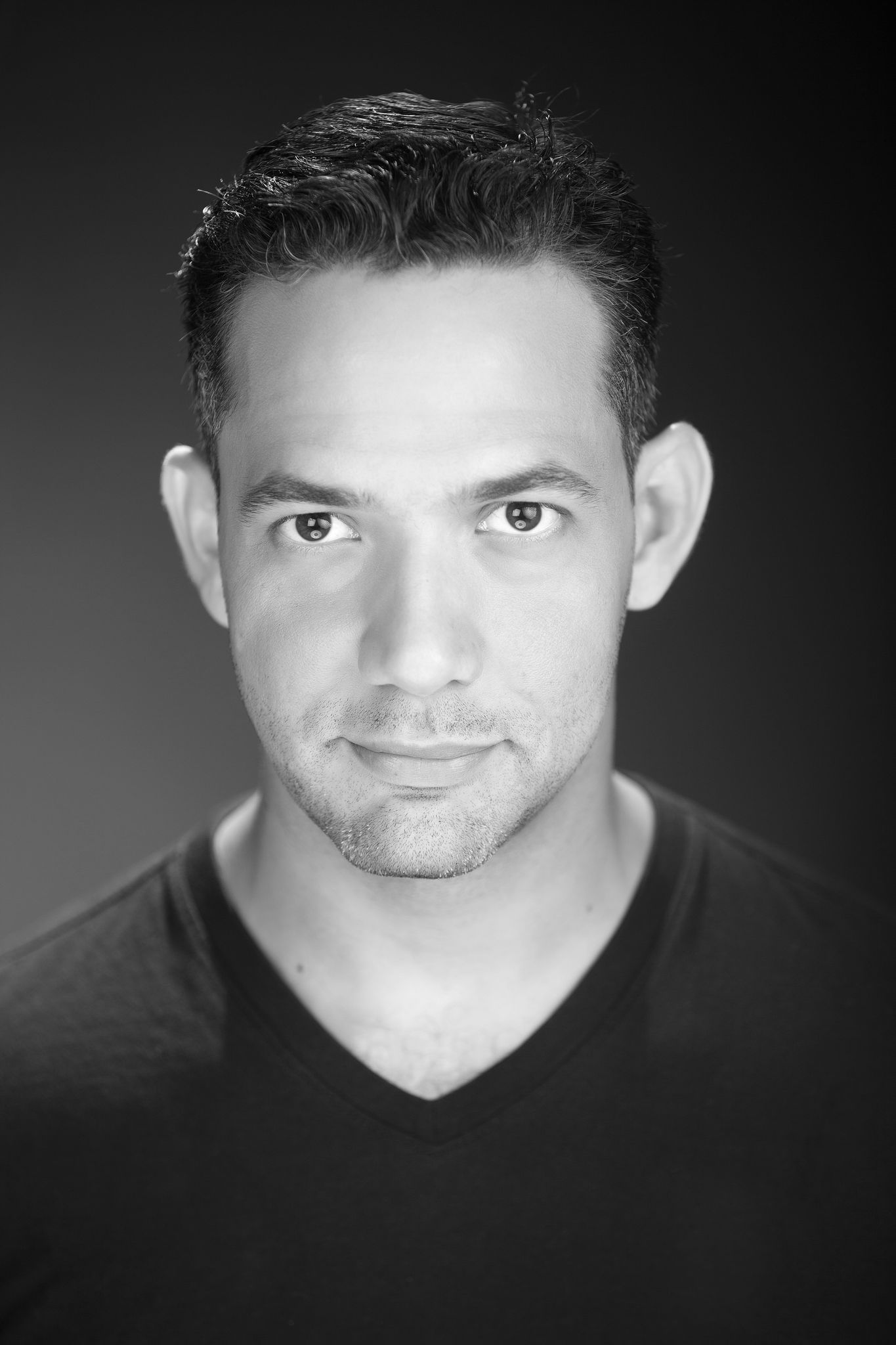
- Sergio Carlo at Chévere Nights set.
- Born: Sergio Nicolás de Jesús Carlo Pichardo; March 19, 1977 (age 49); Santiago, Dominican Republic
- Occupations: Actor; announcer; presenter; political activist
- Years active: 2001–present
- Spouse: Gaby Arriaza (2016 - 2023)

Sergio Nicolás de Jesús Carlo Pichardo (born March 19, 1977) is a Dominican actor best known for his role as Carbo, in Andy García's movie The Lost City and as Manolo Tavarez, opposite Michelle Rodriguez in the film Trópico de Sangre. He is also known as the co-host of Chevere Nights, a television entertainment news show in Dominican Republic. More recently, he has been the producer and host of the YouTube political news satire show, El Antinoti, which has become the most famous show of this nature in the Dominican Republic, being a vocal critic of the government and the establishment.

== Early life ==
He was born Sergio Carlo in Santiago, Dominican Republic to Octavio Carlo and Laura Pichardo, the youngest child with five sisters and three brothers. At the age of 16 he moved to Boston, Massachusetts to pursue his studies in television and radio broadcasting. While in Boston he also participated in infomercials for Geovision and performed in independent student films. He was also a voiceover talent at ESPN.

== Acting career ==
His first recognition as an actor was in the theater productions of Grease and Saturday Night Fever in the Dominican Republic. He later went on to act in various television series, such as Paraíso in 2002 and the film Cuban Blood with Mexican actor Gael García Bernal.

In 2005, he performed in three major films. La Fiesta del Chivo (The Feast of the Goat), based out of a book by the same name. La Maldición del padre Cardona (The Curse of Father Cardona) in which he plays the lover of Hollywood actress Zoe Saldaña (Avatar, Star Trek, Vantage Point, Pirates of the Caribbean), and Andy García's film The Lost City as Carbo.

In 2007 he performed in Trópico a Venevisión Productions soap opera alongside actor Jose Luis Rodriguez (el Puma).

In 2010 he starred in Trópico de Sangre a film directed by Juan Delancer, in which he played Manolo Tavarez, husband of Minerva Mirabal, played by Hollywood actress Michelle Rodriguez. Rodriguez played the lead role of Minerva Mirabal, based out of The Mirabal Sisters true story.

== Filmography ==
Year	Film	Role	Notes
2021	The Suicide Squad	Segundo de Isabella	
2014	Lotoman 003	Commander Lopez	
2014	Let's go Robbery	Thief	
2013	Who's the Boss?	Nathaly's boyfriend	
2012	Jaque Mate		
2012	The King of Najayo	Tito	
2010	Trópico de Sangre	Manolo Tavares	
2007	Tropico	Eddy Jiménez	
2007	Operación Patakón	Teniente Neke	
2006	Viajeros	Johnny	
2005	The Lost City	Carbo	a film by Andy Garcia
2005	The Curse of Father Cardona	Cuso	a.k.a. La maldición del padre Cardona - Dominican Republic (original title)
2005	The Feast of the Goat		a.k.a. La fiesta del chivo - Dominican Republic (original title)
2004	Auf Wiedersehen, Pet	Felipe	Dangerous Liaisons TV episode
2003	Cuban Blood	Rebel #2	a.k.a. Dreaming of Julia - USA (original title)
2003	Paraíso	Tomeo	Todo lo que tengo es tuyo - TV episode

== Other work ==
Sergio Carlo is also a regular co-host in Chévere Nights a television entertainment news show in Dominican Republic. He is also the host of 12 y 2, a nationally syndicated top 40, independent music and talk radio show that airs on 91fm.

== Philanthropic activities ==
Sergio Carlo is an ambassador of Yo Nado con Marcos (also known as Swim Across the Continents) part of the Millennium Development Goals initiative supported by the United Nations. The organization's objective is to eradicate extreme poverty and hunger, to promote education, equality, health and economic development among other world issues. Also, in his native country, Sergio Carlo organizes various food bank drives which he promotes to recruit volunteers through his Twitter.

== Personal life ==
Carlo married Gabriela Virginia Arriaza, of Salvadoran descent, on 23 January 2016 in Jarabacoa, Dominican Republic.
