= Trópico de sangre =

- Directed by: Juan Delancer
- Starring: Michelle Rodriguez; Juan Fernandez; César Évora; Sergio Carlo; Claudette Lali; Celines Toribio
- Music by: Manuel Tejada
- Release date: July 29, 2010 (New York International Latino Film Festival)
- Country: Dominican Republic
- Language: Spanish

Trópico de sangre (English: Tropic of Blood) is a 2010 drama film based on the true story of the Dominican Republic's heroic Mirabal sisters.

== Plot ==
The film focuses on Minerva Mirabal and tells the true story of how she and her sisters came to represent the greatest threat to dictator Rafael Trujillo and his regime. The Mirabal sisters were involved in an underground movement against the government. They were assassinated in 1960 by men under the instruction of the Trujillo regime according to General Pupo Roman, although their death was made to appear as an automobile accident. Many citizens were outraged and a few months later Trujillo was assassinated by an ambush led by Antonio de La Maza, who was played by actor Cesar Evora. Antonio de la Maza was killed in turn by a death squad led by Ramfis Trujillo.

== Cast ==
- Michelle Rodriguez as Minerva Mirabal
- Juan Fernandez as Rafael Trujillo
- César Évora as Antonio de la Maza
- Claudette Lali as Emilia Bencosme
- Sergio Carlo as Manuel "Manolo" Aurelio Tavárez Justo
- Sharlene Taulé as María Teresa Mirabal
- Liche Ariza as Tomas Ovando
- Celines Toribio as Dedé Mirabal
- Luchi Estevez as Patria Mirabal
- Héctor Then as Priest Luis Peña González
- Johnnié Mercedes as Dr. Tejada Florentino
- Solly Duran as Gertrudis
- Miguel Ángel Martínez as Candito Torres

== Filming information ==
The film debuted at the New York International Latino Film Festival on July 29, 2009.

The surviving sister, Dedé Mirabal, consulted on and participated in the production of the film; she was portrayed by actress Celinés Toribio.

== Controversy ==
In July 2008, the president of the Minerva Mirabal Foundation, Carlos Leiter, publicly criticized the film, specifically the involvement of actress Michelle Rodriguez due to her past legal issues. Leiter threatened to sue Rodriguez and her co-producers citing illegal use of the Mirabal name, unless charitable organizations of his choice, including his own, were given all revenues, including Rodriguez's entire personal salary, from the film.

Within days, the film's writer/director Juan Delancer responded to such criticisms by stating "One does not need permission to bring history to film." Delancer pointed out that Dedé Mirabal and the Mirabal family themselves approved of and supported the film and Rodriguez, with Dedé even appearing in the film as its narrator. Delancer also defended Rodriguez, as both a person and actress, saying it is impressive that "a figure of her stature who had just completed projects with the likes of Charlize Theron (in Battle in Seattle) and James Cameron (in Avatar)" would even participate in such a small production, let alone show such "undeniable" dedication to it as both an actress and producer.
