= In the Time of the Butterflies (film) =

2001 film by Mariano Barroso

- Written by: Julia Álvarez; Judy Klass; David Klass
- Directed by: Mariano Barroso
- Starring: Salma Hayek; Edward James Olmos; Mía Maestro; Demián Bichir; Pilar Padilla; Lumi Cavazos; Geraldine Bazán; Pedro Armendáriz, Jr. Ana Martín; Marc Anthony
- Music by: Van Dyke Parks
- Countries of origin: United States; Mexico
- Original languages: English; Spanish

Production
- Producers: Helen Barlett; Helen Buck Bartlett; Tony Bill; Ellen Gordon; Salma Hayek
- Cinematography: Xavier Pérez Grobet
- Running time: 95 minutes
- Production companies: Ventanarosa; MGM Television; Showtime Networks

Original release
- Network: Showtime
- Release: October 21, 2001

In the Time of the Butterflies is a 2001 feature film, produced for the Showtime television network, directed by Mariano Barroso and based on Julia Álvarez's book of the same name. The story is a fictionalized account of the lives of the Mirabal sisters, Dominican revolutionary activists, who opposed the dictatorship of Rafael Trujillo and were assassinated on November 25, 1960.

In the film, Salma Hayek played one of the sisters, Minerva, and Edward James Olmos plays Trujillo. Marc Anthony has a minor role as Minerva's first love, and the impetus for her later revolutionary activities.

== Plot ==
The film begins with pictures and video of the actual victims of Trujillo. During the montage, a title card appears that says:

From 1930 to 1961, General Rafael Leónidas Trujillo held absolute control of the Dominican Republic.
His secret alliance with the church, aristocrats, intellectuals and the press were the foundation of his dictatorship.
His formula to remain in power was simple: murder anyone who opposed him.
More than 30,000 people were executed during his regime of terror...

The scene shifts to a prison cell, where one of his victims, Minerva Mirabal (Salma Hayek), recounts the events of the story.

Minerva and her three sisters, Patria (Lumi Cavazos), Dedé (Pilar Padilla), and María Teresa "Maté" (Mía Maestro), live on a farm in rural Ojo De Agua. Minerva, the outspoken sister, convinces her father, Enrique Mirabal (Fernando Becerril), to send her, Patria, and Maté to a boarding school. The sisters spend five years away at school, during which time Minerva captures the attention of Trujillo (Edward James Olmos), who notices her at a school play.

When school is over, Minerva wishes to study to become a lawyer, but women are not allowed in law school. The sisters return to the farm, and Minerva soon meets and falls in love with Virgilio "Lio" (Marc Anthony), a member of the Dominican resistance, who gives her the nickname "Butterfly", or Mariposa in Spanish. Lio's activities during a college protest are noticed, and he is forced to leave the country out of fear for his life, though he continues to write to Minerva.

Minerva, along with her family, is invited to a formal ball at Trujillo's palace, where she dances with him. During their dance, Minerva asks for permission to attend law school, but Trujillo declines. He grabs Minerva inappropriately, and she responds by recoiling and slapping him in the face. Her family quickly rushes to her side, and Trujillo allows them to leave. The next day, the chief of police, Captain Peña (Pedro Armendáriz, Jr.), arrives at the family farm and takes Minerva's father away. The sisters spend several weeks dealing with the police bureaucracy, trying to locate their father, before it's suggested that there is a way Minerva can get her father out of prison. Minerva goes to the palace, and Trujillo suggests that her father can leave if she stays. Minerva points out that her mother is waiting outside and would "appreciate his hospitality" too. Trujillo decides that they should leave it to chance (a dice roll) to determine if Minerva and her family go free, or if Minerva stays at the palace while her family is released. Minerva accepts, but asks to "up the stakes"—if she wins, she goes free and also gets to attend law school, and if she loses, Trujillo can "have his wish". She rolls the dice and wins, and Trujillo lets her leave.

Minerva's victory is hollow. Her father is released from prison, but has been tortured and soon dies. While attending his funeral, the police chief delivers to Minerva a letter permitting her to attend law school. Minerva's hatred of Trujillo is intense, but she decides to accept his "gift" because she views it as her only way to effectively oppose him.

While in law school, Minerva discovers that Lio has been killed by field agents of Trujillo Servicio de Inteligencia Militar on foreign soil. She meets other members of the opposition, who, through Lio, know of her as "Butterfly". She becomes a member of the resistance, and over time Patria and Maté learn of her activities and become involved too. She falls in love with Manolo Tavárez (Demián Bichir), a fellow law student and member of the resistance, and they are married.

When Minerva graduates from law school, Trujillo is present to pass out the diplomas. All the other students receive diplomas, but he refuses to give Minerva hers, saying he agreed to allow her to attend law school, but not to practice law.

After law school, Minerva has children but continues her opposition activities. After a series of increasingly dangerous events, she, Maté, and many resistance members are arrested and sent to jail. Minerva becomes a symbol. Other prisoners, their guards, and many outsiders secretly voice support for "the Butterflies".

Eventually, Minerva and Maté are released from jail, but their husbands and Patria's are still held captive. The women continue their efforts to locate their husbands. Trujillo stops by to visit Minerva at her home, and she asks for his help to get their husbands released. Trujillo vows to soon help Minerva "end her troubles".

While returning from a trip to visit their husbands, Minerva, Patria, and Maté are stopped on the road by a large group of Trujillo's policemen and soldiers. They are taken some distance off the main road, and the men surround them and beat them to death.

Another title card appears at the end that says:

The Death of the Mirabal Sisters was the final blow to the regime of Leónidas Trujillo, who was assassinated six months later.
Several of the children of the Mirabal sisters held important posts in the later democratic governments of the Dominican Republic.
The day of the sisters' death, November 25th, is observed in many Latin American countries as the International Day Against Violence Towards Women.

== Cast ==
- Salma Hayek as Minerva Mirabal
  - Mariana Sánchez as Minerva (13 years old)
- Edward James Olmos as Rafael Trujillo
- Mía Maestro as Maté Mirabal
- Demián Bichir as Manolo Tavárez
- Pilar Padilla as Dedé Mirabal
- Lumi Cavazos as Patria Mirabal
- Marc Anthony as Lio
- Pedro Armendáriz, Jr. as Captain Peña
- Ana Martín as Mrs. Mercedes Mirabal, the mother
- Paulina Treviño as Sinita
- Ana Layevska as Lina Lovatón
- Fernando Becerril as Mr. Enrique Mirabal
- Roger Cudney as Dominican Ambassador Manuel de Moya
- Anthony Alvarez as Palomino
- Ermahn Ospina as Jaimito
- Raúl Méndez as Pedrito

== See also ==
- Trópico de Sangre, a fact-based film about the Mirabal sisters released in 2010.
