= Jose Tamez =

Jose Tamez is director of development for Salma Hayek's Ventanarosa Productions. For Disney's ABC television network, he developed and served as executive producer of the English-language adaptation of the Colombian television telenovela Ugly Betty, starring America Ferrera. He is also producing (with Hayek, Rick Schwartz, and Edward Borges) La Banda, a Spanish-language romantic comedy, starring Hayek, and written by Issa Lopez. For Viacom's Showtime network, he produced The Maldonado Miracle, starring Salma Hayek. He also produced the television adaptation of Julia Alvarez' novel In the Time of the Butterflies, starring Salma Hayek. Previously Tamez was an executive at Televisa Editorial.
