= Alina Robert =

Cuban actress

- Born: Alina Rodríguez Robert
- Occupation(s): Actress, model, host

Alina Robert is a Cuban actress, model and host. She currently resides in Miami, Florida.

Robert, a native of Havana, moved to the United States in 2008. She first earned recognition by reaching the semifinals on Nuestra Belleza Latina 2014. She went on to co-host Sabado Gigante, the longest running Hispanic program on television.

Robert starred in the HBO Latin America drama Make Love Great Again (2018). She has also appeared on Netflix's Mariposa de Barrio and Telemundo's Betty en NY.

In 2018, Robert appeared on stage as Minerva Mirabal in GALA Hispanic Theatre's production of En El Tiempo de Las Mariposas (In the Time of the Butterflies). For this role, Robert won a BroadwayWorld Award for Best Actress in a Play - Small Professional Theatre.
