= Who's the Boss? (2013 film) =

2013 film

¿Quién manda?
- Film poster
- Directed by: Ronni Castillo
- Written by: Daniel Aurelio
- Starring: Frank Perozo
- Cinematography: Peyi Guzmán
- Release date: 15 August 2013
- Running time: 87 minutes
- Country: Dominican Republic
- Language: Spanish

Who's the Boss? (Spanish: ¿Quién Manda?) is a 2013 Dominican Republic romantic comedy film written by Daniel Aurelio and directed by Ronni Castillo. The film received domestic accolades and was selected as the Dominican Republic entry for the Best Foreign Language Film at the 86th Academy Awards, but did not receive a nomination.

== Synopsis ==
Alex, the lead male character, is an advertising executive whose romantic relationships tend to be short and superficial because he doesn't want to give up his freedom. Everything changes when he meets Natalie, a girl from a similar background. Despite their romantic compatibility, with their headstrong personalities the two struggle to prove "who's the boss."

== Cast ==
- Frank Perozo as Alex
- Nashla Bogaert as Natalie
- Cuquín Victoria as Don Frank
- Amauris Pérez as Eduardo
- Claudette Lali as Carolina
- Akari Endo as Melissa
- Sergio Carlo

== Reception ==
The film brought more than 300,000 viewers to the cinema driven largely by word of mouth. The script was written so that the protagonist would occasionally address the audience, breaking the fourth wall.

Mario Núñez Muñoz, writing for Diario Libre, praised the film for its portrayal of the young Dominican professional class and its discussion of machismo versus feminism, recommending the film for young adults who are willing to laugh at themselves in the mirror.

At the 2014 La Silla Awards, Who's the Boss? won in seven categories: Best Film, Best Director, Best Comedy, Best Actor, Best Cinematography, Best Art Direction, and Best Supporting Actor.

For her performance as Natalie, Nashla Bogaert was nominated for Best Actress at the 2014 Platino Awards.

2014 marked the third year in a row that the Dominican Republic submitted a film for the category "Best Foreign Language Film" at the Academy Awards. The film did not receive a nomination.

== See also ==
- List of submissions to the 86th Academy Awards for Best Foreign Language Film
- List of Dominican submissions for the Academy Award for Best Foreign Language Film
