= Salma Hayek =

Mexican and American actress (born 1966)

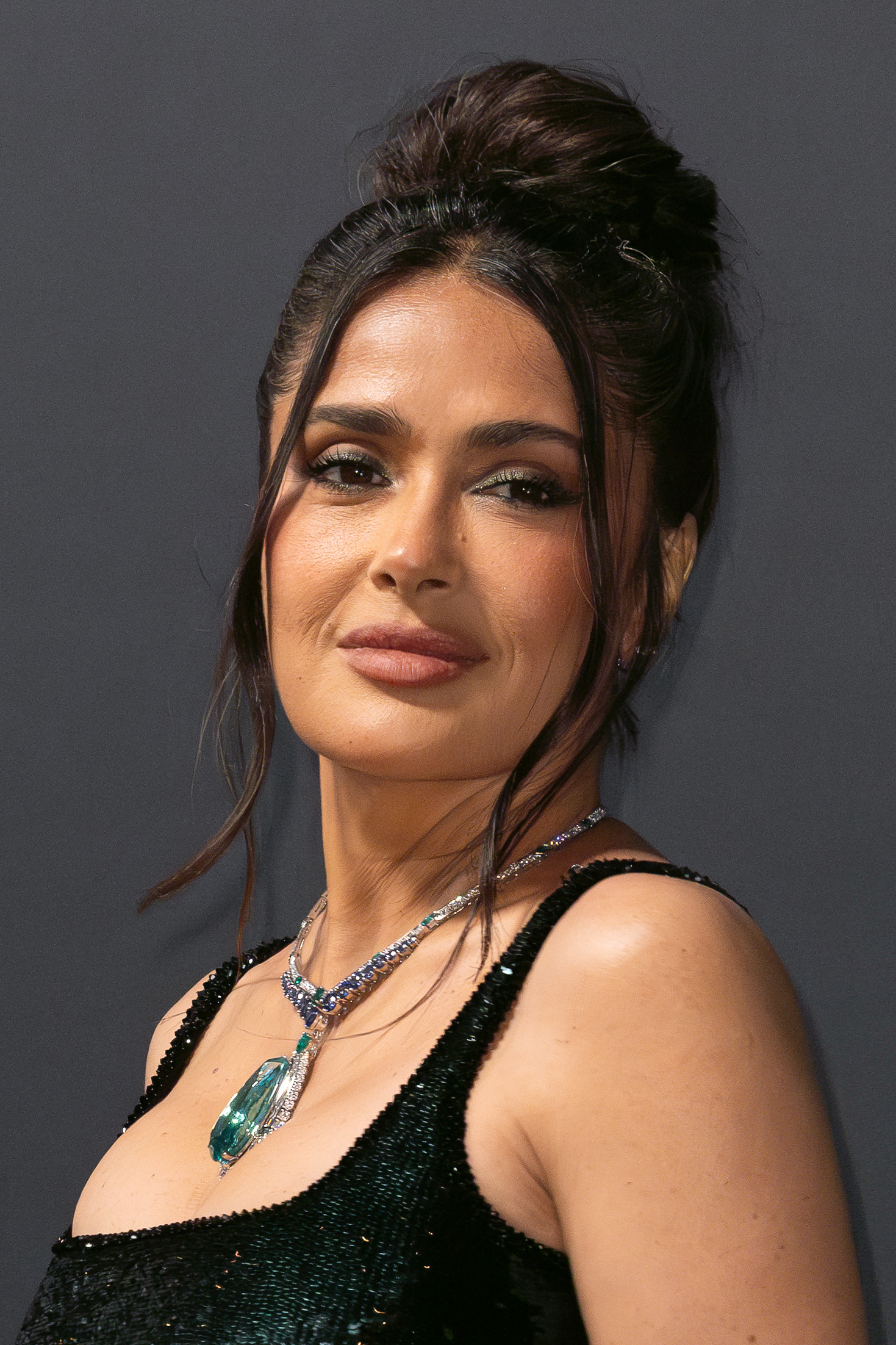
- Hayek in 2025
- Born: Salma Valgarma Hayek Jiménez; September 2, 1966 (age 60); Coatzacoalcos, Veracruz, Mexico
- Citizenship: Mexico; United States; France
- Occupations: Actress; film producer
- Years active: 1988–present
- Works: Full list
- Spouse: François-Henri Pinault (m. 2009)
- Children: 1

Salma Valgarma Hayek Pinault (/ˈhaɪɛk/ HY-ek, Spanish: [ˈsalma ˈxaʝek]; née Hayek Jiménez; born September 2, 1966) is a Mexican and American actress and film producer. She began her career in Mexico with starring roles in the telenovela Teresa (1989–1991) as well as the romantic drama Midaq Alley (1995). She soon established herself in Hollywood with appearances in films such as Desperado (1995), From Dusk till Dawn (1996), Wild Wild West (1999), and Dogma (1999).

Hayek's portrayal of painter Frida Kahlo in the biopic Frida (2002), which she also produced, made her the first Mexican actress to be nominated for the Academy Award for Best Actress. In subsequent years, Hayek focused more on producing while starring in the action-centered pictures Once Upon a Time in Mexico (2003), After the Sunset (2004) and Bandidas (2006). She achieved further commercial success with the comedies Grown Ups (2010), Grown Ups 2 (2013) and The Hitman's Bodyguard (2017), and lent her voice for the animated Puss in Boots (2011), Sausage Party (2016) and Puss in Boots: The Last Wish (2022). She also earned critical acclaim for her performances in the dramas Tale of Tales (2015), Beatriz at Dinner (2017) and House of Gucci (2021). She played Ajak in the Marvel Cinematic Universe film Eternals (2021), which emerged as her highest-grossing live action film.

Hayek's directing, producing and acting work on television has earned her four Emmy Awards nominations. She won the Daytime Emmy Award for Outstanding Directing in a Children Special for The Maldonado Miracle (2004) and received two Primetime Emmy Award nominations, one for Outstanding Guest Actress in a Comedy Series and the other for Outstanding Comedy Series, for her work on the ABC television comedy-drama Ugly Betty (2006–2010). She also produced and played Minerva Mirabal in the Showtime film In the Time of the Butterflies (2001) and guest-starred on the NBC comedy series 30 Rock (2009–2013).

As a public figure, Hayek has been cited as one of Hollywood's most powerful and influential Latina actresses as well as one of the world's most beautiful women by various media outlets. Time magazine named her one of the 100 most influential people in the world in 2023. In 2021, she was honored with a star on the Hollywood Walk of Fame. She is married to business magnate François-Henri Pinault, with whom she has a daughter.

== Early life ==
Salma Hayek was born in Coatzacoalcos, Veracruz, Mexico. Her father, Sami Hayek Domínguez, is of Lebanese descent. His ancestors hail from the city of Baabdat, Lebanon, a city Salma and her father visited in 2015 to promote her movie The Prophet. He owns an industrial-equipment firm and is an oil company executive in Mexico; he once ran for mayor of Coatzacoalcos. Her mother, Diana Jiménez Medina, is an opera singer and talent scout; she is of Spanish descent. While visiting Madrid in an interview in 2015 with Un Nuevo Día, Hayek described herself as fifty percent Lebanese and fifty percent Spanish, saying that her grandmother/maternal great-grandparents were from Spain. Her younger brother, Sami, is a furniture designer.

Hayek was raised in a wealthy, devout Catholic family, and at age 12 opted to study at the Academy of the Sacred Heart in Grand Coteau, Louisiana. In school, she was diagnosed with dyslexia. She attended university at the Universidad Iberoamericana studying international relations. In a 2011 interview with V magazine, Hayek mentioned that she had once been an illegal immigrant in the United States, although it was not for a long period of time.

== Career ==
=== Early roles in Mexico (1988–1994) ===
Hayek's first screen appearance was in the television series in Un Nuevo Amanecer (1988), which earned her the TVyNovelas Award for Best Debut Actress. Televisa subsequently selected Hayek, who was 23 at the time, to play the title role in Teresa (1989–1991), a successful Mexican telenovela that made her a star in Mexico. The series ran for two years and 125 episodes, earning her the 1990 TVyNovelas Award for Best Female Revelation.

Determined to pursue a film career in Hollywood, Hayek moved to Los Angeles in 1991 following the conclusion of Teresa. With limited fluency in English and dyslexia, she soon enrolled in English lessons and studied acting under Stella Adler. Hayek initially struggled with the lack of acting job offers after moving to the United States, recalling that "there was no industry or parts for Latin women", and was once even told that her accent would "make moviegoers think of housekeepers". During this period, she secured guest-spots in television series such as Dream On (1992) and The Sinbad Show (1993) as well as supporting roles in the drama Mi Vida Loca (1993), and the made-for-Showtime thriller Roadracers (1994), her first collaboration with director Robert Rodriguez.

In 1994, Hayek was cast as Alma, a poverty-stricken young woman who becomes a sex worker, in Jorge Fons's drama El callejón de los milagros (Miracle Alley), which was based on the 1940s eponymous novel by Egyptian Naguib Mahfouz and translated from Cairo to Mexico City. The film was the subject of critical acclaim, reportedly won more awards than any other movie in the history of Mexican cinema, and earned Hayek a nomination for the Ariel Award for Best Actress. Hayek was one of the few actresses permitted to appear on both Televisa and TV Azteca, through a special dispensation from Emilio Azcárraga Milmo, who tried to persuade her to return to Mexico with an exclusive deal, which she declined in order to pursue a career in Hollywood.

=== Hollywood breakthrough (1995–2001) ===
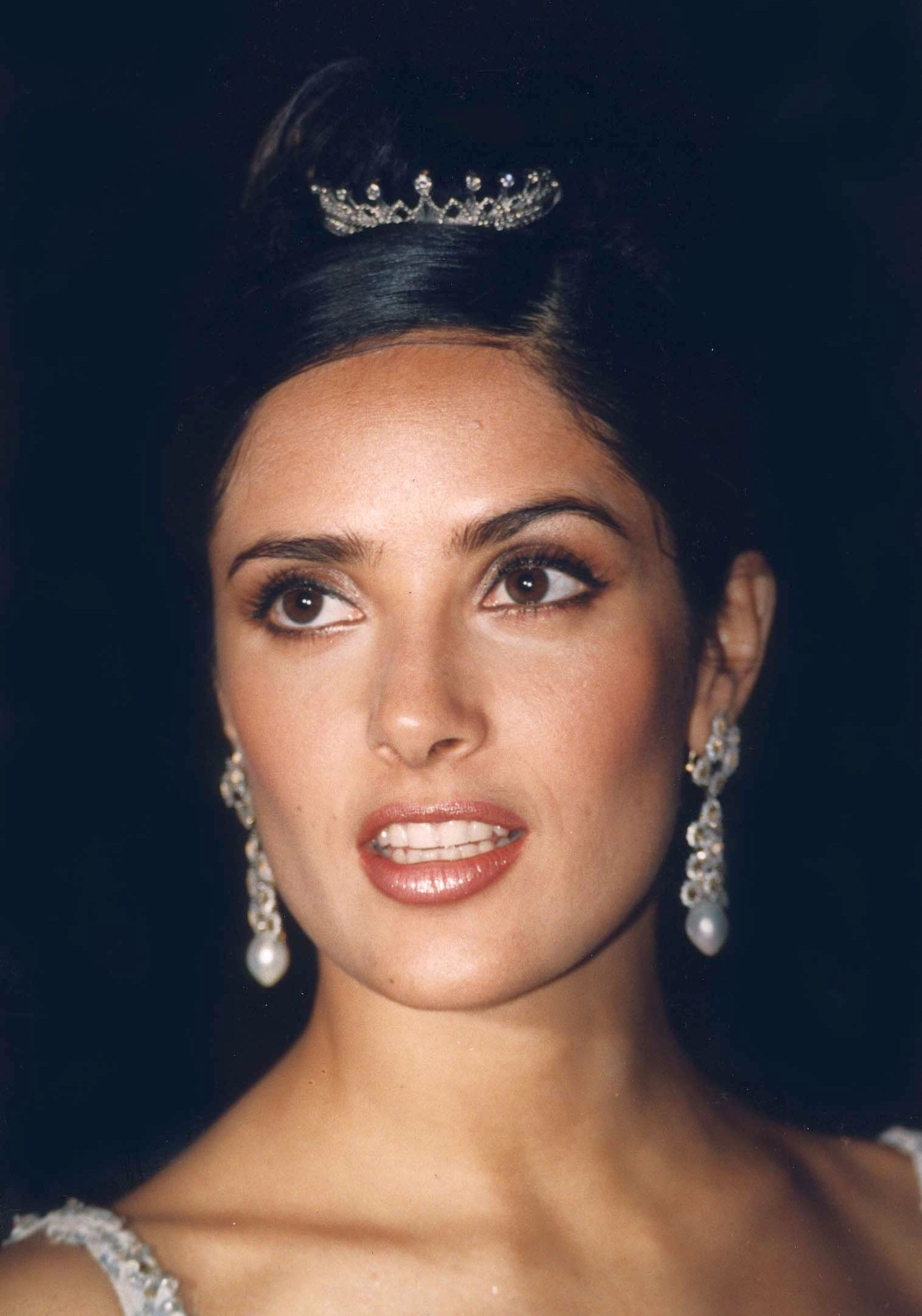
Hayek in 1998 at the White House Correspondents dinner

In 1995, Robert Rodriguez and his co-producer and then-wife, Elizabeth Avellan, cast Hayek opposite Antonio Banderas in the starring role of self-confident and feisty Carolina in Desperado, her breakout film. Describing the film's process as "grueling", Hayek had to audition several times for Rodriguez before landing the part, and a love scene in the script proved particularly difficult for her to film because she did not want to be nude on camera. She once remarked: "It took eight hours [to film] instead of an hour". Budgeted at $7 million, Desperado was a commercial success, grossing $25.4 million in the United States. A brief role as a vampire queen followed in Rodriguez's cult horror film From Dusk till Dawn (1996), in which she performed an erotic table-top snake dance. She also appeared in the 1996 drama Follow Me Home and the cop comedy Fled.

Hayek next starred in the romantic comedy Fools Rush In (1997) as a photographer in an on-and-off relationship with a New York City architect, played by Matthew Perry. Critic Roger Ebert gave the film 3 out of 4 stars and described it as "a sweet, entertaining retread of an ancient formula", elevated by good performances (particularly Hayek's) and an insightful "level of observation and human comedy". Fools Rush In was a moderate commercial success and earned Hayek an ALMA Award nomination for Outstanding Actress in a Feature Film. In another romantic comedy, Breaking Up (also 1997), she and Russell Crowe portrayed a couple whose relationship leads to an out-of-the-blue marriage. Ken Eisner of Variety wrote: "Russell Crowe and Salma Hayek make attractive leads, but they have neither the marquee power nor the requisite chemistry to keep Breaking Up from getting left at the altar of general distribution." Indeed, the film was distributed for selected markets in the United States only.

In 1998, Hayek played an aspiring young singer in the 1970s New York City nightlife scene in Mark Christopher's drama 54, a doughnut shop waitress in Dan Ireland's dramedy The Velocity of Gary and a nurse in Rodriguez's supernatural horror film The Faculty. In 1999, Hayek was unorthodoxly cast in Kevin Smith's religious satire Dogma as Serendipity, "the [Muse] who throughout history inspired all the geniuses of art and music, like Mozart and Michelangelo, and never got any of the credit". She also portrayed the alleged daughter of a kidnapped scientist alongside Will Smith in the period Western Wild Wild West. Dogma was well received by critics and audiences, but Wild Wild West proved a commercial failure despite being one of the most expensive films ever made at the time of its release.

Hayek founded her production company, Ventanarosa, in 1999, through which she produces film and television projects. Her first feature as a producer was El Coronel No Tiene Quien Le Escriba (1999), Mexico's official selection for Best Foreign Film at the Oscars. In 2000, Hayek had an uncredited role in Traffic, and played an aspiring actress in Mike Figgis' experimental film Timecode, a waitress in the Spanish drama Living It Up, and a cop and Playboy model in the heist comedy Chain of Fools. She also produced and starred in the television film In the Time of the Butterflies (2001), based on the book by Julia Álvarez book about the Mirabal sisters. Hayek played one of the sisters, Minerva, and Edward James Olmos played the Dominican dictator Rafael Leónidas Trujillo, whom the sisters opposed.

=== Worldwide recognition (2002–2009) ===
In Julie Taymor's biographical film Frida (2002), Hayek served as a producer and starred as surrealist painter Frida Kahlo. She became interested in the role several years prior to commencing production for the film, having "been fascinated by Kahlo's work from the time she was 13 or 14", although not immediately a fan: "At that age I did not like her work [...] I found it ugly and grotesque. But something intrigued me, and the more I learned, the more I started to appreciate her work. There was a lot of passion and depth. Some people see only pain, but I also see irony and humor. I think what draws me to her is what [husband] Diego saw in her. She was a fighter. Many things could have diminished her spirit, like the accident or Diego's infidelities. But she wasn't crushed by anything". She was so determined to play the role that she sought out Dolores Olmedo Patino, longtime-lover of Diego Rivera, and, after his death, administrator to the rights of Frida and Rivera's art, which Rivera had "willed [...] to the Mexican people", bequeathing the trust to Olmedo. Hayek personally secured access to Kahlo's paintings from Kahlo and began to assemble a supporting cast, approaching Alfred Molina for the role of Rivera in 1998. Upon its release, Frida was a critical darling and an arthouse success. In his review for the film, David Denby of The New Yorker concluded: "Smart, willful, and perverse, this Frida is nobody's servant, and the tiny Hayek plays her with head held high". Her portrayal of Kahlo made her the first Mexican actress to be nominated for the Academy Award for Best Actress and earned her Golden Globe Award, Screen Actors Guild Award and British Academy Film Award nominations for Best Actress.

In 2003, Hayek produced and directed The Maldonado Miracle, a Showtime film based on the book of the same name, for which she won the Daytime Emmy Award for Outstanding Directing in a Children Special, reunited with Robert Rodriguez for Spy Kids 3-D: Game Over and Once Upon a Time in Mexico, and made an appearance in the documentary V-Day: Until the Violence Stops. Once Upon a Time in Mexico, which made $98.2 million worldwide, was the final film of the Mariachi Trilogy and featured Hayek reprising her role from Desperado.

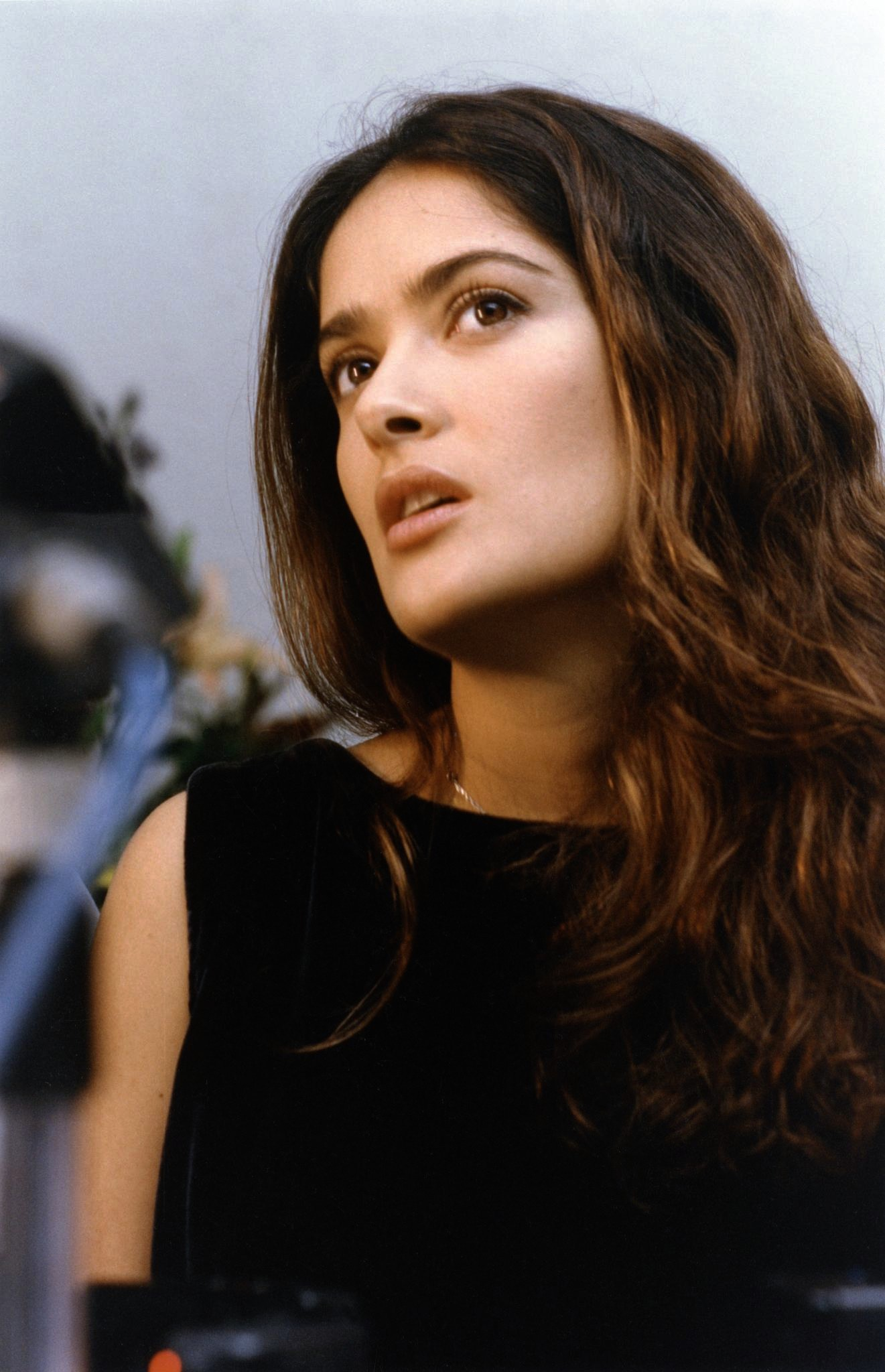
Hayek at the 2004 Guadalajara International Film Festival

In Brett Ratner's action comedy After the Sunset (2004), Hayek starred as the girlfriend of a master thief, with Pierce Brosnan. A box office flop, the film received largely negative reviews from critics. James Berardinelli found the film to be "a mess, but [it's] a fun, breezy mess", criticizing the overall heist and weak characterization but gave praise to the quick pacing chemistry between Brosnan and Hayek. In 2005, she served as a member of the 58th Cannes Film Festival jury, co-hosted the annual Nobel Peace Prize Concert with Julianne Moore in Oslo, Norway, and directed a music video for Prince, titled "Te Amo Corazon" ("I love you, sweetheart") that featured Mía Maestro.

Hayek appeared alongside her good friend Penélope Cruz in the 2006 Western comedy Bandidas, portraying two women who become a bank robbing duo in an effort to combat a ruthless enforcer terrorizing their town. Randy Cordova of the Arizona Republic said the film "sports" Hayek and her co-star Penélope Cruz as the "lusty dream team" and that they were the "marketing fantasy" for the film. Bandidas was followed by Ask the Dust, a period romance set in Los Angeles based on a John Fante novel and co-starring Colin Farrell. Peter Bradshaw of The Guardian found "something a little forced in both lead performances", and with a limited theatrical release, the film was not a financial success. Her last film of 2006 was Lonely Hearts, a neo-noir crime drama chronicling the notorious "lonely hearts killers" of the 1940s, Raymond Fernandez and Martha Beck, in which Hayek played Beck, with Jared Leto taking on the role of Fernandez. The film received mixed reviews from critics, but the cast garnered praise. Peter Travers of Rolling Stone stated: "When Hayek and Leto are onscreen, you do not look away."

Hayek served as an executive producer for the American television series Ugly Betty (2006–2010), after adapting the story for American television with Ben Silverman, who acquired the rights and scripts from the Colombian telenovela Yo Soy Betty La Fea in 2001. Originally intended as a half-hour sitcom for NBC in 2004, the project would later be picked up by ABC for the 2006–2007 season with Silvio Horta also producing. She guest-starred on the series as Sofia Reyes, a magazine editor. Ugly Betty was a success with critics and audiences, won a Golden Globe Award for Best Comedy Series in 2007, and earned Hayek nominations for both Outstanding Guest Actress in a Comedy Series and Outstanding Comedy Series at the 59th Primetime Emmy Awards. After finalizing negotiations with MGM to become the CEO of her own Latin-themed film production company, Ventanarosa, in 2007, Hayek signed a two-year deal with ABC for Ventanarosa to develop projects for the network.

In 2007, Hayek made a cameo appearance, as a nurse singing a cover of The Beatles song "Happiness Is A Warm Gun", in Julie Taymor's jukebox musical romantic drama Across the Universe. The role of Madame Truska, a woman who can grow an indestructible beard, in Cirque du Freak: The Vampire's Assistant (2009), was Hayek's first acting project following the birth of her daughter. She characterized the film, which was an adaptation of the book series The Saga of Darren Shan by author Darren Shan, as "a little bit of hard work. But it's not like I have to be emotionally devastated for months". The film was a critical and commercial failure. Screen Rant felt that Hayek is "fun as the bearded lady Madame Truska but [...] is unable to single-handedly elevate the material".

=== Continued commercial success (2010–2017) ===
In 2010, Hayek played a fashion designer and the wife of a Hollywood talent agent (Adam Sandler) in the comedy Grown Ups which, despite a negative critical reception, made $271.4 million globally. She is the voice of Kitty Softpaws, a street-savvy Tuxedo cat, alongside Antonio Banderas in Puss in Boots (2011). A spin-off of the Shrek franchise, Puss in Boots received positive reviews from critics, grossed $554.9 million at the box office, and was nominated for Best Animated Feature at the 84th Academy Awards. In 2011, she also obtained Hispanic roles in two international productions —a dancer in the French drama Americano and the wife of a former advertising executive in the Spanish As Luck Would Have It— which earned her nominations for the San Sebastián International Film Festival Award for Best Actress and the Goya Award for Best Actress, respectively.

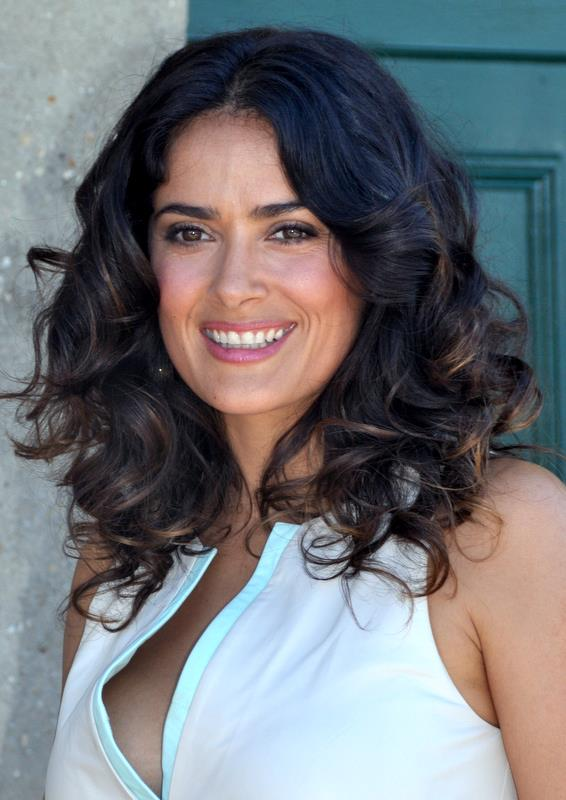
Hayek at the 2012 Deauville American Film Festival

In 2012, Hayek directed Jada Pinkett Smith in the music video "Nada Se Compara", lent her voice for Peter Lord's animated film The Pirates! In an Adventure with Scientists!, and played a cartel leader in Oliver Stone's action film Savages and a school nurse in Frank Coraci's comedy Here Comes the Boom. She reprised her role in Grown Ups 2 (2013) which, like the first film, was a commercial success despite a negative critical response.

Hayek served as a producer and provided her voice for the character of Kamila, a widowed mother, in The Prophet (2014), adapted from the 1923 book by Kahlil Gibran. Describing the film as a "love letter to my heritage", Hayek said it helped her explore her relationship with her late grandfather, who was a fan of the book, and remarked: "Between all the connections of our ancestors and the memories of the ones that are no longer with us, I hope they are proud of this film because I did it also for them". In 2014, she made a brief appearance in James Bobin's comedy sequel Muppets Most Wanted, starred as a woman forced into sexual slavery in Joe Lynch's action drama Everly, and reunited with Pierce Brosnan to play his love interest in Tom Vaughan's romantic comedy Some Kind of Beautiful. Everly and Some Kind of Beautiful were both distributed for online markets and poorly received; while critics noted that the former "benefits from Joe Lynch's stylish direction and Salma Hayek's starring work, but it's too thinly written and sleazily violent to fully recommend", Rotten Tomatoes gave the latter a 6% rating based on 34 reviews.

In Tale of Tales (2015), a European fantasy film directed and written by Matteo Garrone, Hayek appeared as the 17th-century Queen of Longtrellis. A screen adaptation based on collections of tales by Italian poet and courtier Giambattista Basile, the film competed for the Palme d'Or at the 68th Cannes Film Festival. In 2016, Hayek voiced the role of Teresa del Taco in Sausage Party, an adult animated film she described as "the naughtiest thing I've ever done. I never thought I'd ever say some of those things out loud. But, I had a lot of fun [...] It's a different kind of crazy". The highest grossing R-rated animated film of all time, Sausage Party grossed $140.4 million worldwide.

Hayek took on the role of a holistic medicine practitioner who attends a wealthy client's dinner party in Miguel Arteta's drama Beatriz at Dinner (2017), which Owen Gleiberman of Variety called a "small-scale but elegantly deft squirmfest that features a luminous performance" by the actress. That role earned Hayek an Independent Spirit Film Award nomination for Best Female Lead. The comedy How to Be a Latin Lover (2017) was a sleeper hit upon its release and featured Hayek as the estranged sister of a man who has made a career of seducing rich older women. Her last film outing of 2017 was Patrick Hughes's action comedy The Hitman's Bodyguard, in which she starred as the wife of a convicted hitman, opposite Ryan Reynolds and Samuel L. Jackson. The film made an impressive $176.6 million globally.

=== 2018–present ===
Hayek was cast as Eva Torres, a high-frequency trading executive, alongside Jesse Eisenberg and Alexander Skarsgård, in Kim Nguyen's tech drama The Hummingbird Project (2018), and as Nancy Teagarten, one half of a couple experiencing a series of financial crises, with Alec Baldwin, in Fred Wolf's comedy Drunk Parents (2019). In 2020, Hayek appeared as a cosmetics mogul in Miguel Arteta's comedy Like a Boss, with Rose Byrne and Tiffany Haddish, and the alternative wife of a man in Sally Potter's drama The Roads Not Taken, with Javier Bardem and Elle Fanning.

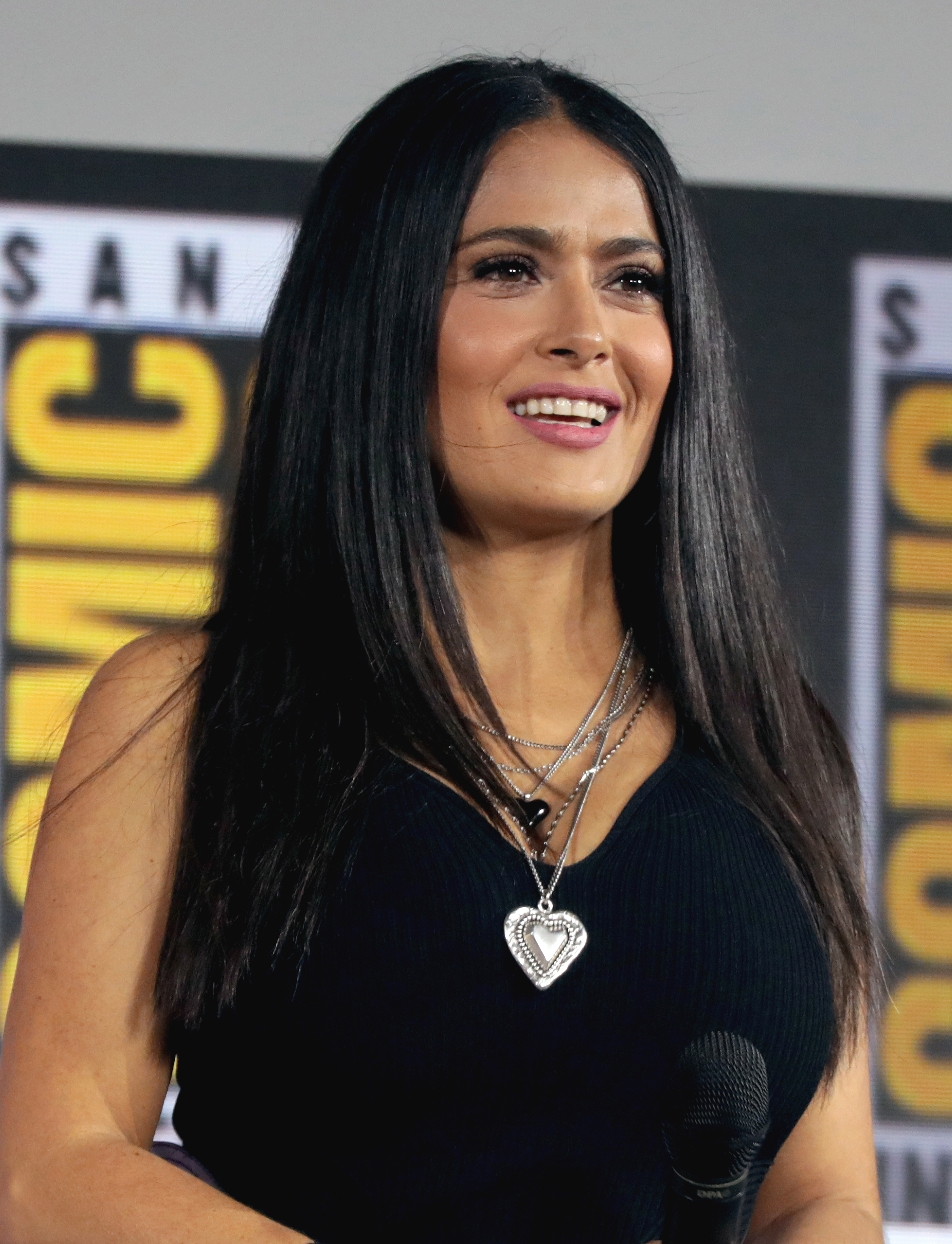
Hayek at the 2019 San Diego Comic-Con

The drama Bliss (2021), which starred Hayek as a homeless woman befriending a recently divorced man (Owen Wilson), was released on Amazon Prime Video. She next reunited with director Patrick Hughes and actors Ryan Reynolds and Samuel L. Jackson in Hitman's Wife's Bodyguard, the sequel for the 2017 film The Hitman's Bodyguard, which was released on June 16, 2021, to mediocre reviews. John Defore of The Hollywood Reporter, however, praised Hayek's "foul-mouthed" portrayal, writing: "The one smart thing the film does is promote Salma Hayek, as the eponymous spouse of Samuel L. Jackson's hitman, from the small but scene-stealing role she played in the first film. [...] At least we can appreciate Hayek's enthusiasm for the over-the-top role". Unlike the first film, Hitman's Wife's Bodyguard had lackluster box office returns.

Hayek portrayed Ajak, the wise and spiritual leader of the titular group, in the Marvel Cinematic Universe picture Eternals, directed by Chloé Zhao, who "personally selected" her for the role. Initially surprised by Marvel's interest on her casting, Hayek described her involvement in the film as "empowering" and recalled getting "emotional" upon seeing her character's superhero costume, stating: "It was because it means so much to so many people that, to think that for a Mexican girl —a Mexican woman in her 50s— was able to be a superhero. I felt a lot of pride to have my superhero outfit on. It meant something". Hayek, who is of both Spanish and Lebanese descent, subsequently became the first Arab actress with a main role in the Marvel Cinematic Universe. The film, released in the United States on November 5, 2021, generated a divergent critical response and made $401 million worldwide. She has since signed a deal to star in multiple Marvel Cinematic Universe projects. Her last film of 2021 was Ridley Scott's biographical crime drama House of Gucci, in which she played the friend and confidante of Patrizia Reggiani, Giuseppina "Pina" Auriemma, alongside Lady Gaga as Reggiani, Adam Driver, and her Lonely Hearts co-star Jared Leto. Hayek then reprised her role as Kitty Softpaws in Puss in Boots: The Last Wish, which received critical acclaim, grossed $485.3 million, and like its predecessor was nominated for the Academy Award for Best Animated Feature.

In June 2022, Hayek was cast in Angelina Jolie's upcoming film, Without Blood, based on the bestselling Italian novel by Alessandro Baricco. It was filmed in Rome, Apulia, and Basilicata. Hayek will star in the film alongside Demián Bichir.

In 2023, she appeared as herself in the episode "Joan Is Awful" of the Netflix anthology Black Mirror.

== Other ventures ==
=== Advocacy ===
Hayek's charitable work includes increasing awareness on violence against women and discrimination against immigrants. On July 19, 2005, Hayek testified before the U.S. Senate Committee on the Judiciary supporting reauthorizing the Violence Against Women Act. In February 2006, she donated $25,000 to a Coatzacoalcos, Mexico, shelter for battered women and another $50,000 to Monterrey based anti-domestic violence groups. She is a board member of V-Day, the charity founded by playwright Eve Ensler. While Hayek previously stated that she is not a feminist, she later revised her stance, stating: "I am a feminist because a lot of amazing women have made me who I am today. [...] But – it should not be just because I am a woman".

Hayek also advocates breastfeeding. During a 2009 UNICEF fact-finding trip to Sierra Leone, she breastfed a hungry week-old baby whose mother could not produce milk. Hayek said she did it to reduce the stigma associated with breastfeeding and to encourage infant nutrition. In 2010, Hayek's humanitarian work earned her a nomination for the VH1 Do Something Awards. In 2013, alongside Beyoncé and Frida Giannini, Hayek launched "Chime for Change", a Gucci campaign that aims to spread female empowerment. For International Women's Day 2014 Hayek was one of the artist signatories of Amnesty International's letter, to then British Prime Minister David Cameron, campaigning for women's rights in Afghanistan. Following her visit to Lebanon in 2015, Hayek criticized the discrimination against women there.

On December 13, 2017, Hayek published an op-ed in The New York Times stating that she had been harassed and abused by film producer Harvey Weinstein during the production of Frida.

In 2019, the Pinault family pledged US$113 million to support the reconstruction efforts of Notre Dame Cathedral in Paris, following its destruction in a fire. In 2020, Hayek raised awareness through her Instagram for the disappearance of Vanessa Guillén.

=== Endorsements ===
Hayek was a spokeswoman for Revlon in 1998 and has been a spokeswoman for Avon cosmetics since February 2004. She modeled for Chopard in 2001, was featured in a series of Spanish language commercials for Lincoln cars in 2002, and in Campari ads, photographed by Mario Testino, in 2006. On April 3, 2009, she helped introduce La Doña, a watch by Cartier inspired by fellow Mexican actress María Félix.

Hayek has worked with the Procter & Gamble Company and UNICEF to promote the funding (through disposable diaper sales) of vaccines against maternal and neonatal tetanus. She is a global spokesperson for the Pampers/UNICEF partnership to help raise awareness of the program. The partnership involves Procter & Gamble donating the cost of one tetanus vaccination (approximately 24 cents) for every pack of Pampers sold.

In 2008, Hayek co-founded Juice Generation's juice delivery program Cooler Cleanse. After writing the foreword to Juice Generation founder Eric Helms' 2014 book The Juice Generation: 100 Recipes for Fresh Juices and Superfood Smoothies, she and Helms launched the beauty subscription delivery service Blend It Yourself in 2017, based on Hayek's personal beauty elixirs, which supplies subscribers with the prepared organic frozen smoothie and acai bowl ingredients.

In 2011, Hayek launched her own line of cosmetics, skincare, and haircare products called Nuance by Salma Hayek, to be sold at CVS stores in North America.

== Public image ==
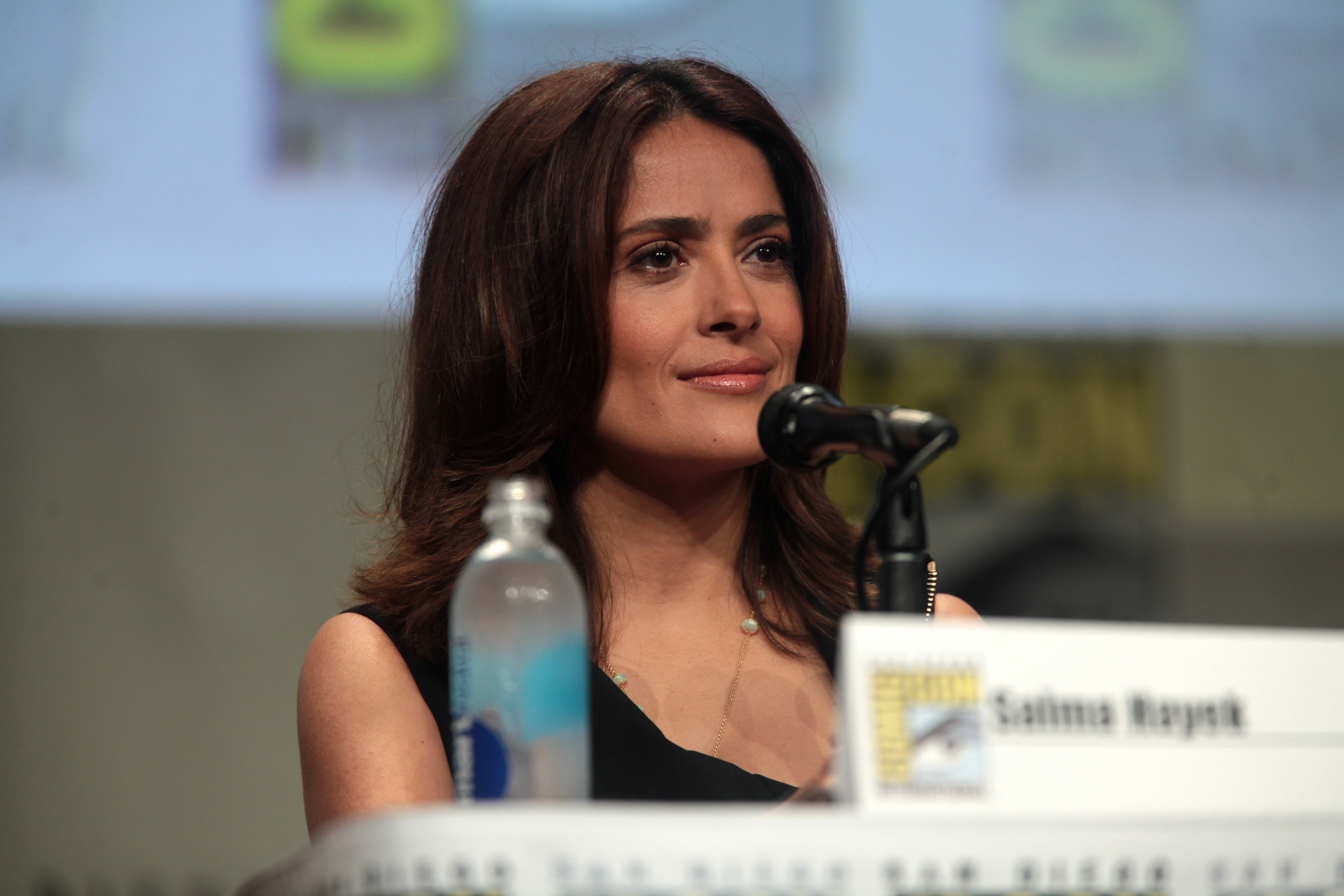
Salma Hayek speaking at the 2014 San Diego Comic-Con

Early in her career, Hayek came to be regarded as a sex symbol, and most of her early films, it has been noted, such as the action-oriented Desperado, From Dusk Till Dawn, and Fled, "predominantly featured her in racy sex symbol type of roles" and ultimately made Hayek a familiar face with mainstream audiences. Various media publications have cited her as one of Hollywood's most beautiful actresses. People named her one of the 50 most beautiful people in the world in 1996, 2003 and 2008, Maxim ranked her 34th and 90th on their Hot 100 list in 2005 and 2007, respectively, and FHM included her on their 100 Sexiest Women in the World list in 2005 and 2006. A July 2007 poll by E-Poll Market Research found Hayek to be the "sexiest celebrity" among a group of 3,000 public figures, with 65 percent of respondents using the term "sexy" to describe her. The Armani dress Hayek wore to the 1997 Academy Awards was voted by E! Entertainment as one of the five most memorable in Oscar history.

From April 7 to June 18, 2006, the Blue Star Contemporary Art Center in San Antonio, Texas hosted an exhibition called "Solamente Salma" (Spanish for "Only Salma"), consisting of 16 portrait paintings by muralist George Yepes and filmmaker Robert Rodriguez of Hayek as the Aztec goddess Itzpapalotl. In July 2007, The Hollywood Reporter ranked Hayek 4th in their Latino Power 50, a list of the most powerful Latin members of Hollywood. In 2008, she was awarded the Women in Film Lucy Award, in recognition of her creative works that have enhanced the perception of women through the medium of television, and Entertainment Weekly ranked her 17th in their list of the 25 Smartest People in TV.

Throughout her career, Hayek has graced the covers of numerous international magazines, including North America's InStyle, Elle, Premiere, Glamour and Variety; Britain's Maxim, Marie Claire and Total Film; and France's Entrevue and Madame Figaro. She was one of fifteen women selected to appear on the cover of the September 2019 issue of British Vogue, by guest editor Meghan, Duchess of Sussex.

Hayek, a big soccer fan, was appointed an ambassador for the 2026 FIFA World Cup. On June 11, 2026, at the opening ceremony, she gave a brief welcome speech during the first protocol parade of a World Cup in which the 48 flags of the participating countries could be seen.

== Personal life ==
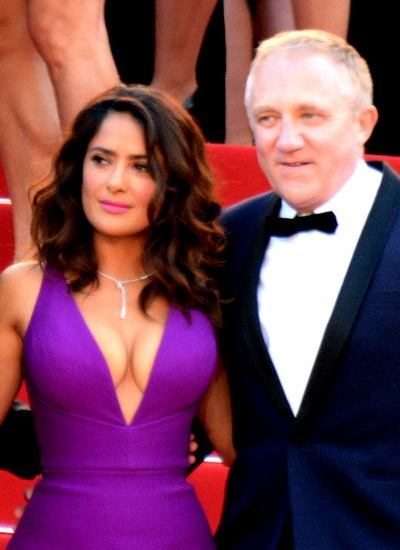
Hayek with her husband François-Henri Pinault at the 2015 Cannes Film Festival

Hayek is a naturalized United States citizen. She has studied at Ramtha's School of Enlightenment and practices yoga. Hayek, who was raised Catholic, stated in a 2007 interview that she was no longer devout and did not believe in the Church, in part because she disagreed with practices such as its campaign against condoms in Africa, where she said AIDS and overpopulation were rampant, though she clarified that she still believed in Jesus Christ and God.

On March 9, 2007, Hayek confirmed her engagement to French billionaire and Kering CEO François-Henri Pinault as well as her pregnancy. She gave birth to their daughter on September 21, 2007, at Cedars-Sinai Medical Center in Los Angeles, California. They were married on Valentine's Day 2009 in Paris. On April 25, 2009, they renewed their vows in Venice, Italy.

== Filmography and accolades ==
Hayek's films that have earned the most at the box office, as of 2022, include:

- Wild Wild West (1999)
- Frida (2002)
- Once Upon a Time in Mexico (2003)
- Spy Kids 3-D: Game Over (2003)
- Grown Ups (2010)
- Puss in Boots (2011)
- The Pirates! (2012)
- Savages (2012)
- Grown Ups 2 (2013)
- Sausage Party (2016)
- How to Be a Latin Lover (2017)
- The Hitman's Bodyguard (2017)
- Eternals (2021)
- House of Gucci (2021)
- Puss in Boots: The Last Wish (2022)

Hayek's performance as Frida Kahlo in Frida (2002) garnered her nominations for Best Actress at the 75th Academy Awards, the 61st Golden Globe Awards, the 53rd British Academy Television Awards and the 9th Screen Actors Guild Awards. She won the Daytime Emmy Award for Outstanding Directing in a Children Special for The Maldonado Miracle (2004) and received two Primetime Emmy Award nominations, one for Outstanding Guest Actress in a Comedy Series and the other for Outstanding Comedy Series as an executive producer, for her work on Ugly Betty (2006–10). In 2011, Hayek was appointed Knight (Chevalier) of the National Order of the Legion of Honour, the highest French order of merit, and in 2021, she was honored with a star on the Hollywood Walk of Fame.
