= Patria Mirabal =

Dominican activist (1924–1960)

Patria Mercedes Mirabal Reyes (Note: In this Hispanic American name, the first or paternal surname is Mirabal and the second or maternal family name is Reyes.) (February 27, 1924 – November 25, 1960) was a Dominican activist and member of the resistance movement against the dictatorship of Rafael Leonidas Trujillo in the Dominican Republic. She was the oldest of the four Mirabal Sisters, who became symbols of political resistance and women's rights in Latin America.

== Early life and education ==
Patria Mercedes Mirabal Reyes was born in Ojo de Aguas, Salcedo, Dominican Republic, to Enrique Mirabal Fernández and Mercedes Reyes Camilo. She attended the Colegio Inmaculada Concepción in La Vega, where she studied alongside her sisters. At the age of 17, she married Pedro Antonio González, a farmer and political activist with whom she had four children.

== Political activism ==
During the 1950s, opposition to the dictatorship of Rafael Trujillo grew throughout the Dominican Republic. Patria joined resistance movements with her sisters Minerva and María Teresa. They became members of the Movimiento 14 de Junio, a secret organization dedicated to overthrowing the regime.

== Assassination ==
On November 25, 1960, Patria, Minerva, and María Teresa Mirabal were returning home after visiting their imprisoned husbands when they were stopped by Trujillo's secret police. The women and their driver, Rufino de la Cruz, were murdered, and their deaths were staged as an accident.

== Legacy ==
Patria Mirabal and her sisters are remembered as national heroines in the Dominican Republic and international symbols of resistance against political oppression and violence against women.
