= Michelle Rodriguez =

American actress (born 1978)

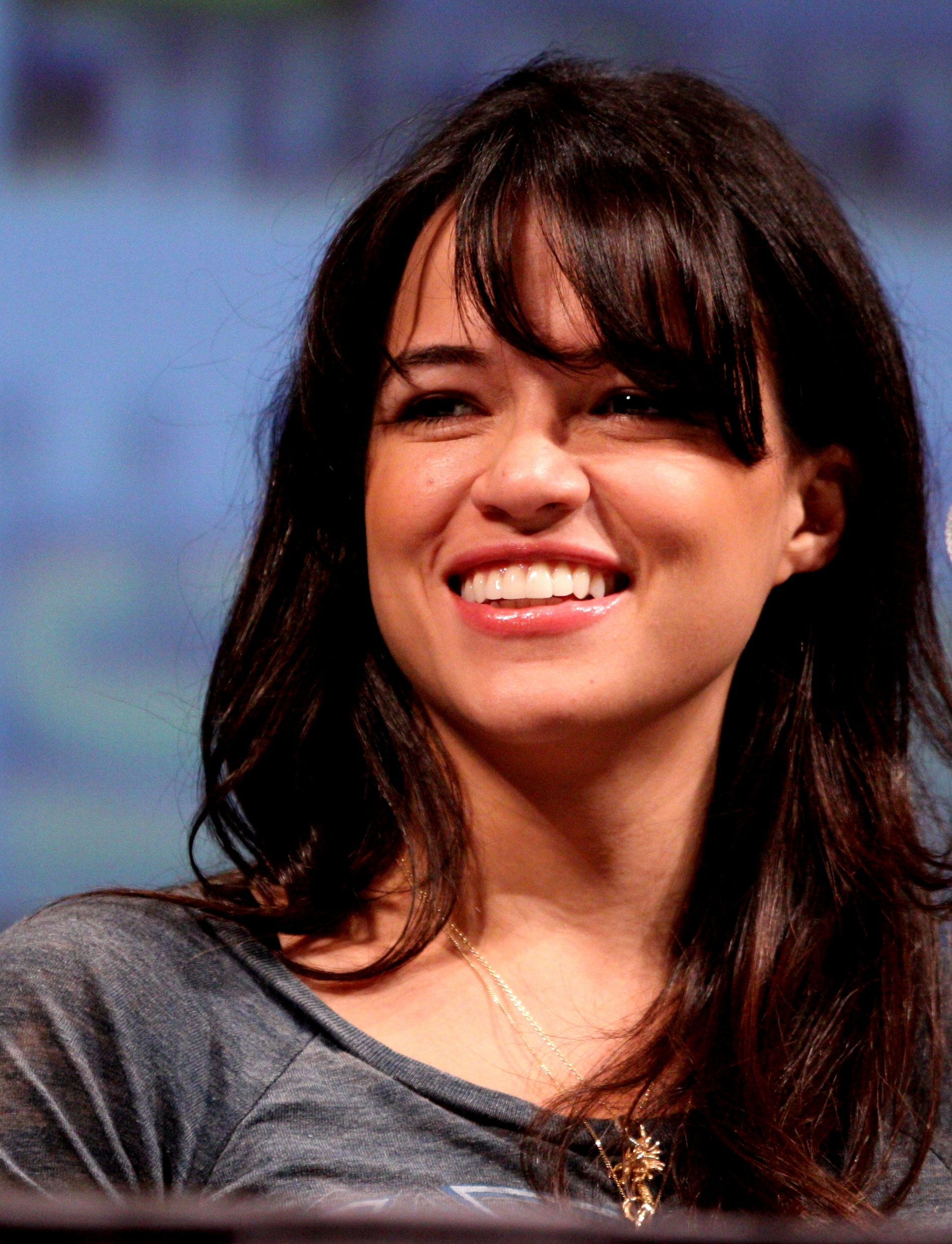
- Rodriguez in 2010
- Born: Mayte Michelle Rodríguez; July 12, 1978 (age 48); San Antonio, Texas, U.S.
- Occupation: Actress
- Years active: 1999–present

Mayte Michelle Rodríguez (born July 12, 1978) is an American actress. She began her career in 2000, playing a troubled boxer in the independent sports drama film Girlfight (2000), where she won the Independent Spirit Award and Gotham Award for Best Debut Performance. Rodriguez played Letty Ortiz in the Fast & Furious franchise (2001, 2009–present) and Rain Ocampo in the Resident Evil franchise (2002, 2012). She has starred in the crime thriller S.W.A.T. (2003), James Cameron's science fiction epic Avatar (2009), and in the action film Battle: Los Angeles (2011).

After playing Minerva Mirabal in the biopic Trópico de Sangre (2010), Rodriguez headlined the exploitation films Machete (2010) and Machete Kills (2013), and starred in the animated comedy films Turbo (2013) and Smurfs: The Lost Village (2017), while her performance in the heist film Widows (2018) was critically praised.

Outside of film, Rodriguez played Ana Lucia Cortez in the drama television series Lost (2005–2006; 2009–2010), and voiced Liz Ricarro in the English-language translation of the anime Immortal Grand Prix (2005–2006). She reprised her roles in video game spin-offs of Avatar and Fast & Furious, and also appeared in True Crime: Streets of LA (2003), Driver 3 (2004), Halo 2 (2004), and Call of Duty: Black Ops II (2012).

== Early life ==
Mayte Michelle Rodriguez was born on July 12, 1978, in San Antonio, Texas. Her mother, Carmen Milady Rodriguez (née Pared Espinal), (Note: In this Spanish name, the first or paternal surname is "Pared" and the second or maternal family name is "Espinal".) is Dominican, while her father, Rafael Rodriguez, was Puerto Rican and served in the U.S. Army. Rodriguez moved to the Dominican Republic with her mother when she was eight years old, and lived there until age 11. Later, she moved to Puerto Rico until the age of 17, and finally settled in Jersey City, New Jersey. She dropped out of William L. Dickinson High School, but later earned her GED. In total, she was expelled from five schools. She briefly attended business school before quitting to pursue a career in acting, with the ultimate goal of becoming a screenwriter and director. Rodriguez has ten siblings and half-siblings. She was partly raised by her devoutly religious maternal grandmother, and was brought up as a Jehovah's Witness (her mother's religion), although she has since abandoned the faith. A DNA test of Rodriguez, performed by the television program Finding Your Roots, found that her ancestry is 72.4% European, 21.3% African, and 6.3% Native American. She stated on the show that there was some racial conflict between her families, since her Puerto Rican father had a light complexion as opposed to her darker skinned Dominican mother.

== Career ==
=== Film and television ===
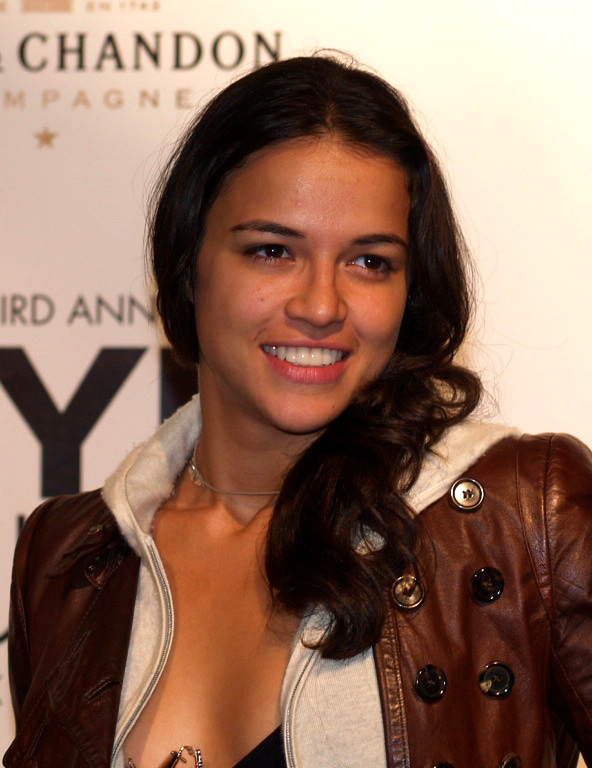
Rodriguez at the New York Fashion Week in 2006

Having run across an ad for an open casting call and attending her first audition, Rodriguez beat 350 other applicants to win her first role in the low-budget 2000 independent film Girlfight. With her performance as Diana Guzman, a troubled teen who decides to channel her aggression by training to become a boxer, Rodriguez accumulated several awards and nominations for the role in independent circles, including major acting accolades from the National Board of Review, Deauville Film Festival, Independent Spirit Awards, Gotham Awards, Las Vegas Film Critics Sierra Awards, and many others. The film itself took home a top prize at the Sundance and won Award of the Youth at the Cannes Film Festival.

Rodriguez has had notable roles in other successful films, including Letty in The Fast and the Furious (2001) and Rain Ocampo in Resident Evil (2002). She appeared in Blue Crush and S.W.A.T. In 2004, Rodriguez lent her voice to the video game Halo 2, playing a Marine. She provided the voice of Liz Ricarro in the Cartoon Network series Immortal Grand Prix. From 2005 to 2006, she played tough cop Ana Lucia Cortez on the television series Lost during the show's second season (the character's first appearance was a flashback during the first season's finale, "Exodus: Part 1"), and returned for a cameo in the second episode of the show's fifth season, "The Lie", in 2009. She returned again in the penultimate episode of the series, "What They Died For", in 2010. In 2006, Rodriguez appeared in her own episode of G4's show Icons.

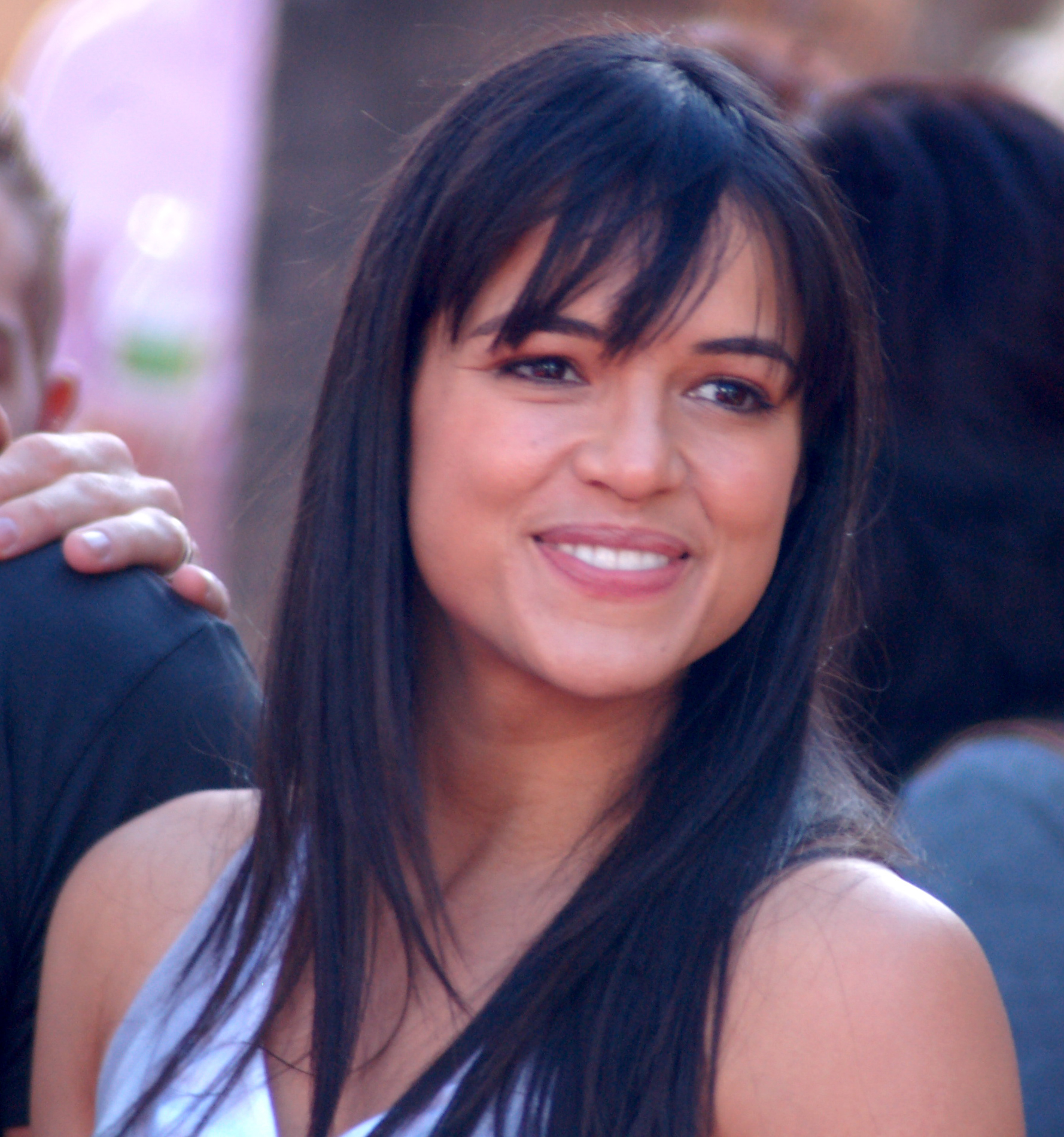
Rodriguez in December 2009

In 2007, Rodriguez appeared in the political drama Battle in Seattle opposite Charlize Theron and Woody Harrelson. In 2009, she appeared in Fast & Furious, the fourth installment of The Fast and the Furious film series. Later that year, Rodriguez starred in James Cameron's science fiction adventure epic Avatar, which became the highest-grossing film in history and Rodriguez's most successful film to date. In 2009, Rodriguez starred in Trópico de Sangre, an independent film based on the Dominican Republic's historic Mirabal sisters.

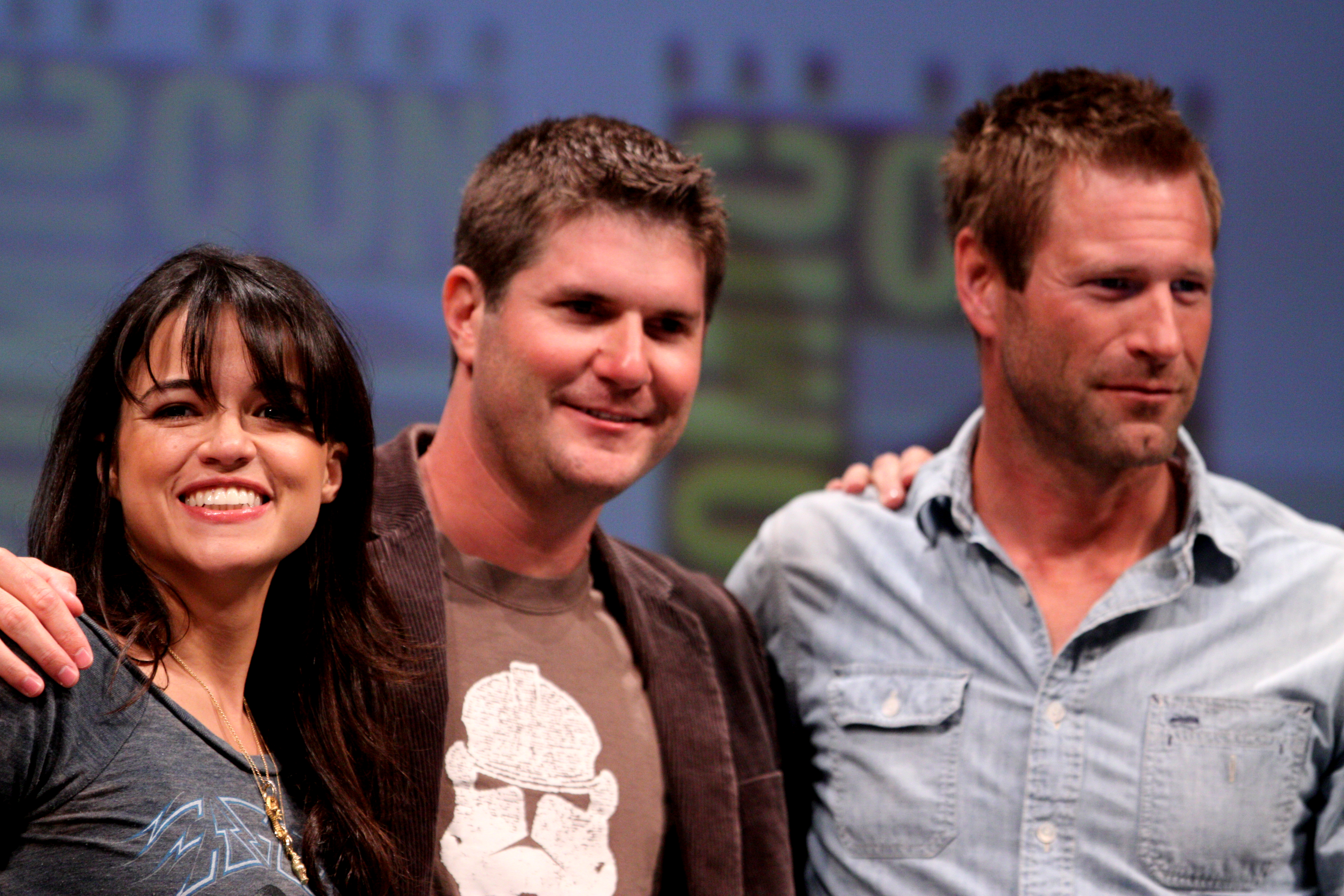
From left to right, Rodriguez, Jonathan Liebesman and Aaron Eckhart at the 2010 San Diego Comic-Con

In 2010, Rodriguez appeared in Robert Rodriguez's Machete. In 2011, she appeared with Aaron Eckhart in the science fiction film Battle: Los Angeles. In 2012, she returned to play the good clone and bad clone of Rain Ocampo in Resident Evil: Retribution. In 2013, she reprised her roles as Letty Ortiz in Fast & Furious 6 and Luz / Shé in the Robert Rodriguez sequel Machete Kills. She also voiced a character in DreamWorks Animation's Turbo.

In 2015, she appeared in Furious 7. In 2016 she starred in The Assignment alongside Sigourney Weaver. In 2017, she lent her voice to Smurfs: The Lost Village. She starred in The Fate of the Furious, which broke records for the largest global box office opening of all time. In 2018, she starred opposite Viola Davis in Widows from director Steve McQueen, and in 2019 reunited with director James Cameron on the film Alita: Battle Angel. Rodriguez started Cheshire Kat Productions, a production company that produced the documentary Stuntwomen: The Untold Hollywood Story (2019).

=== Screenwriting ===
As of 2013, Rodriguez stated she was working on several projects, including a family adventure film, a drug drama, and a female-oriented period piece.

== Personal life ==
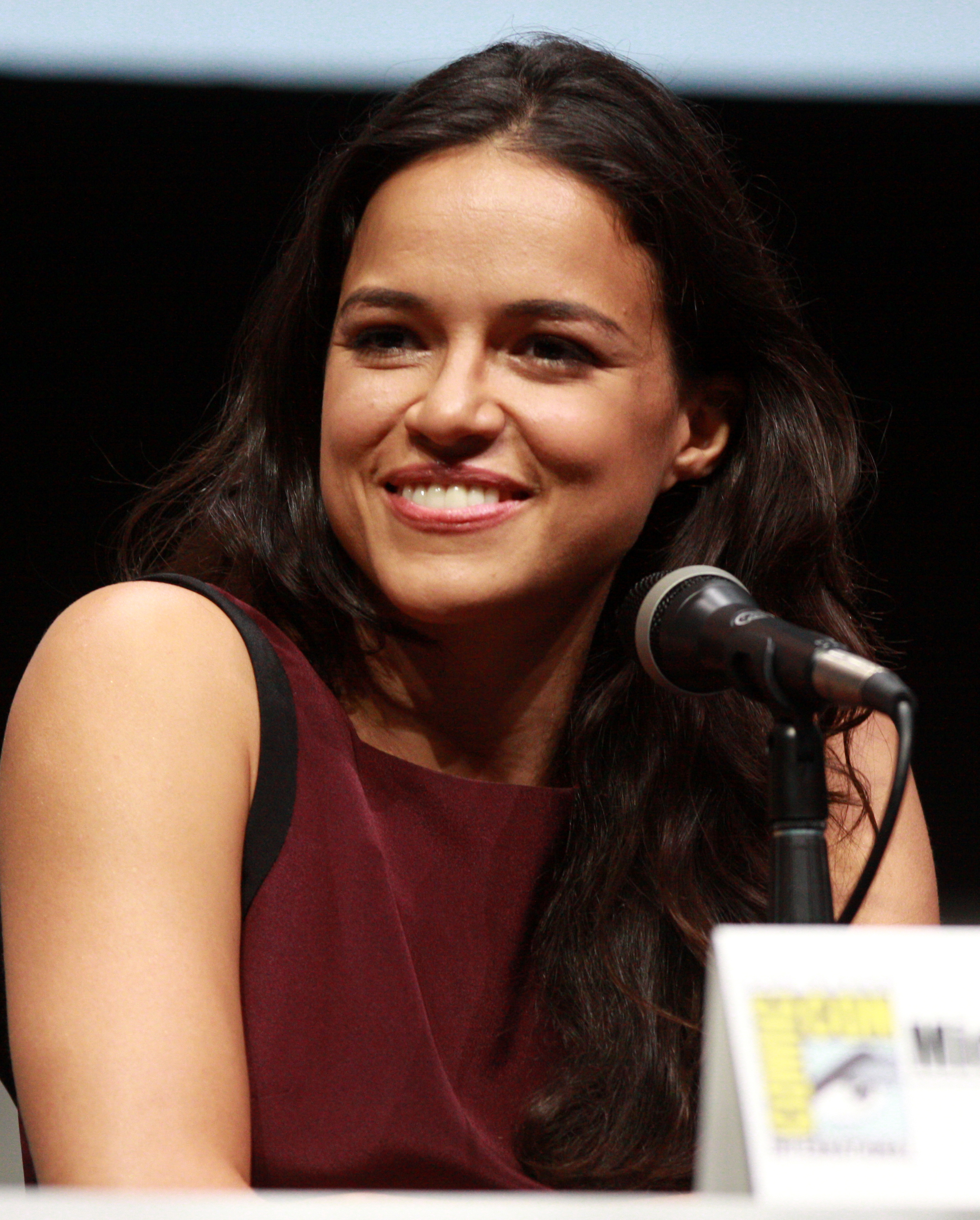
Rodriguez at San Diego Comic-Con in 2013

Rodriguez's hobbies include tactical gun training, skydiving, and DJing.

In early 2000, Rodriguez broke off an engagement to a Muslim boyfriend, citing opposition to religious requests he made of her. In 2001, she reportedly dated her Fast & Furious co-star Vin Diesel.

In late 2010, Rodriguez trained with Sea Shepherd to join the direct action activism of the marine conservation organization during Operation No Compromise.

In 2013, Entertainment Weekly quoted her as saying: "I've gone both ways. I do as I please. I am too curious to sit here and not try when I can. Men are intriguing. So are chicks." As she explained to Latina magazine: "I'm getting older. Eventually it's going to wrinkle up and I'm not going to be able to use it. I wanted to be honest about who I am and see what happens." The following year, she said in an interview that she hoped her actions would help others in a similar situation: "Maybe by me opening my big fat mouth like I usually do and stepping up and owning who I am, maybe it might inspire somebody else to do the same." She described herself as bisexual in another interview later that month: "Bi, yeah, I fall under the B-category of LGBT." Regarding the lack of unconventional female roles available in films, she said: "What's wrong with being bi? I mean, we're getting flak everywhere we go."

=== Legal issues ===
In March 2002, Rodriguez was arrested for assault after getting into a fight with her roommate. The charges were later dropped after the roommate declined to press the allegations in court.

In November 2003, Rodriguez went to court to face eight misdemeanor charges based on two driving incidents, including a hit and run and driving under the influence (DUI). In June 2004, Rodriguez pleaded no contest in Los Angeles to three of the charges: Hit and run; drunken driving; and driving with a suspended license. She went to jail for 48 hours, performed community service at the morgues of two New York hospitals, completed a three-month alcohol program, and was placed on probation for three years.

In 2005, while filming Lost in Hawaii, Rodriguez was pulled over by Honolulu police multiple times for speeding violations, and on December 1 was arrested for DUI. In April 2006, she pleaded guilty to one charge of driving under the influence, and chose to pay a US$500 fine and spend five days in jail.

Rodriguez cited her high doses of allergy-relieving steroids as one of the reasons for her erratic behavior. Because the incident was a violation of her Los Angeles probation, she was sentenced to 60 days in jail, a 30-day alcohol rehabilitation program, and another 30 days of community service, including work for Mothers Against Drunk Driving. Because of overcrowding, she was released from jail on the same day she entered.

In September 2007, Rodriguez allegedly violated her probation by neither completing her community service nor following an alcohol education program. On October 10, 2007, following a hearing, she was sentenced to 180 days jail time after agreeing to admit to violating her probation. She was expected to spend the full 180-day term in jail but was released 18 days later due to overcrowding. In January 2009, Rodriguez completed her community service.

== Filmography ==
Film
| Year | Title | Role | Notes |
|---|---|---|---|
| 2000 | Girlfight | Diana Guzman | |
| 2001 | The Fast and the Furious | Letty Ortiz | |
| 2001 | 3 A.M. | Salgado | |
| 2002 | Resident Evil | Rain Ocampo | |
| 2002 | Blue Crush | Eden | |
| 2003 | S.W.A.T. | Officer Christina "Chris" Sanchez | |
| 2004 | Control | Teresa | |
| 2005 | BloodRayne | Katarin | |
| 2006 | The Breed | Nicki | |
| 2007 | Battle in Seattle | Lou | |
| 2008 | Gardens of the Night | Lucy | |
| 2008 | Adventures in Voice Acting | Herself | Documentary |
| 2009 | Fast & Furious | Letty Ortiz | |
| 2009 | Los Bandoleros | Letty Ortiz | Short film |
| 2009 | Avatar | Captain Trudy Chacón | |
| 2010 | Machete | Luz / Shé | |
| 2010 | Trópico de Sangre | Minerva Mirabal | |
| 2011 | Battle: Los Angeles | Technical Sergeant Elana Santos | |
| 2012 | Resident Evil: Retribution | Rain Ocampo | |
| 2013 | InAPPropriate Comedy | Harriet | |
| 2013 | Fast & Furious 6 | Letty Ortiz | |
| 2013 | Turbo | Paz (voice) | |
| 2013 | Machete Kills | Luz / Shé | |
| 2015 | Furious 7 | Letty Ortiz | |
| 2016 | The Assignment | Frank Kitchen / Tomboy | |
| 2016 | Milton's Secret | Ms. Ferguson | |
| 2017 | Smurfs: The Lost Village | Smurf Storm (voice) | |
| 2017 | The Fate of the Furious | Letty Ortiz | |
| 2018 | Widows | Linda | |
| 2019 | Alita: Battle Angel | Gelda | Uncredited cameo |
| 2020 | She Dies Tomorrow | Sky | |
| 2021 | Crisis | Supervisor Garrett | |
| 2021 | F9 | Letty Ortiz | |
| 2023 | Dungeons & Dragons: Honor Among Thieves | Holga Kilgore | |
| 2023 | Fast X | Letty Ortiz | |
| 2026 | Ray Gunn | Roz Dexler | Voice role |
| TBA | Egg Baby † | | Filming |

Television
| Year | Title | Role | Notes |
|---|---|---|---|
| 2003 | Slavi's Show | Herself | TV show (1 episode) |
| 2005 | Punk'd | Herself | 1 episode |
| 2005–2006 | Immortal Grand Prix | Liz Ricarro | Voice role, anime TV series |
| 2005–2006; 2009–2010 | Lost | Ana Lucia Cortez | Guest (season 1); main cast (season 2); special guest star (seasons 5 & 6) |
| 2011 | CollegeHumor Original | Jessica | Episode: "Sorority Pillow Fight" |
| 2011 | Curiosity | Herself | Episode: "Alien Invasion: Are We Ready?" |
| 2012 | Germany's Next Top Model | Herself | Episode: "A Dream Comes True: Hollywood is Waiting" |
| 2015 | Running Wild with Bear Grylls | Herself | Episode: "Michelle Rodriguez" |
| 2015 | Super Into | Herself | Episode: "Michelle Rodriguez is Super Into Superbikes" |
| 2021 | Getaway Driver | Co-Host | |
| 2023 | Barmageddon | Herself | Episode: "Kelly Clarkson vs. Michelle Rodriguez" |

Video games
| Year | Title | Role | Notes |
|---|---|---|---|
| 2003 | True Crime: Streets of LA | Rosie Velasco | Voice |
| 2004 | Driver 3 | Calita Martinez | Voice |
| 2004 | Halo 2 | Marine | Voice |
| 2009 | James Cameron's Avatar: The Game | Captain Trudy Chacon | Voice |
| 2012 | Call of Duty: Black Ops II | Strike Force Soldier | Voice |
| 2020 | Fast & Furious Crossroads | Letty Ortiz | Voice and motion capture |

Music
| Year | Title | Artist(s) |
|---|---|---|
| 2000 | "I Can Do Too" | Cole featuring Queen Latifah |
| 2001 | "Always on Time" | Ja Rule and Ashanti |
| 2002 | "If I Could Fall in Love" | Lenny Kravitz |
| 2015 | "Confident" | Demi Lovato |
| 2018 | "Nice for What" | Drake |

Theme park ride appearances
| Year | Title | Role |
|---|---|---|
| 2015 | Fast & Furious: Supercharged | Letty Ortiz |

== Awards and nominations ==
Accolades for Michelle Rodriguez
| Year | Award | Category | Nominated work | Result |
|---|---|---|---|---|
| 2001 | Chicago Film Critics Association Award | Most Promising Newcomer | Girlfight | Nominated |
| 2001 | Deauville Film Festival | Best Female Performance | Girlfight | Won |
| 2001 | ALMA Award | Outstanding Latino Cast in a Feature Film | Girlfight | Nominated |
| 2001 | Black Reel Award | Best Actress | Girlfight | Nominated |
| 2001 | Independent Spirit Award | Best Debut Performance | Girlfight | Won |
| 2001 | National Board of Review Award | Best Breakthrough Performance by an Actress | Girlfight | Won |
| 2001 | Gotham Award | Breakthrough Actor | Girlfight | Won |
| 2001 | Las Vegas Film Critics Society Award | Best Actress | Girlfight | Nominated |
| 2001 | Las Vegas Film Critics Society Award | Best Female Newcomer | Girlfight | Won |
| 2001 | Online Film Critics Society Award | Best Breakthrough Performance | Girlfight | Nominated |
| 2002 | ALMA Award | Best Actress in Film | The Fast and the Furious | Nominated |
| 2002 | ALMA Award | Outstanding Actor/Actress in a Made for Television Movie or Miniseries | 3 A.M. | Nominated |
| 2002 | MTV Movie Award | Best On-Screen Team (with Kate Bosworth and Sanoe Lake) | Blue Crush | Nominated |
| 2002 | Imagen Foundation Award | Best Supporting Actress in a Film | S.W.A.T. | Won |
| 2005 | Screen Actors Guild Award | Outstanding Performance by an Ensemble in a Drama Series | Lost | Won |
| 2005 | Saturn Award | Best Supporting Actress on Television | Lost | Nominated |
| 2006 | Golden Raspberry Award | Worst Supporting Actress | BloodRayne | Nominated |
| 2009 | ALMA Award | Actress in a Film | Fast & Furious | Nominated |
| 2011 | ALMA Award | Favorite Movie Actress-Drama/Adventure | Battle: Los Angeles | Nominated |
| 2013 | Teen Choice Awards | Choice Summer Movie Star: Female | Fast & Furious 6 | Nominated |
| 2015 | Teen Choice Awards | Choice Movie Actress: Action | Furious 7 | Nominated |
| 2015 | People's Choice Award | Favorite Action Movie Actress | Furious 7 | Nominated |
| 2015 | Chinese American Film Festival | Golden Angel for Best Leading Actress of the Year | Furious 7 | Won |
| 2017 | Teen Choice Awards | Choice Movie Actress: Action | The Fate of the Furious | Nominated |
