= María Teresa Mirabal =

Surveyor and political activist from the Dominican Republic

- Born: Antonia María Teresa Mirabal Reyes; October 15, 1935; Salcedo, Dominican Republic
- Died: November 25, 1960 (aged 25)
- Occupations: Political activist, surveyor
- Known for: Mirabal sisters
- Spouse: Leandro Guzmán
- Children: 1
- Parents: Enrique Mirabal Fernández (father); Mercedes Reyes Camilo (mother)

Antonia María Teresa Mirabal Reyes de Guzmán (October 15, 1935 – November 25, 1960) was a surveyor and political activist from the Dominican Republic. She was one of three sisters assassinated together at the direction of the country's dictator Rafael Leónidas Trujillo.

== Early years ==
María Teresa was the youngest of four sisters born into a wealthy family in the Dominican province of Salcedo (now, after a name change, it is called Hermanas Mirabal, or in English, Mirabal Sisters). Her parents were Enrique Mirabal Fernández and Mercedes Reyes Camilo.

Like her sisters before her, she attended Colegio Inmaculada Concepción de La Vega. She graduated from the Colegio Sagrado Corazón de Jesús in Santiago de los Caballeros and in 1954, from the Liceo de San Francisco de Macorís in mathematics. She then continued her studies to become a surveyor at the Autonomous University of Santo Domingo. On February 14, 1958, she married fellow engineer Leandro Guzmán and on February 17, 1959, their daughter Jacqueline was born. Maria Teresa admired her sister Minerva and like her became involved in political activities. In time, the siblings became known collectively as the Mirabal Sisters.

Her outrage at the "trujillista tyranny" was so profound that she joined a January 1959 conspiracy that was hatched in the residence of Guido D'Alessandro (political nephew of her sister Minerva) to lay the foundations for what later would be called the June 14 Revolutionary Movement, hoping to overthrow dictator Rafael Leónidas Trujillo.

== Detentions ==
On January 20, 1960, María Teresa was detained at a military base in Salcedo, but released on the same day. Two days later, on January 22, she and sister Minerva were detained and taken to La Cuarenta, the infamous torture prison, and then transferred to another prison, La Victoria. They were released on February 7, 1960, but shortly thereafter, on March 18, María Teresa and Minerva were arrested again and returned to La Cuarenta. They were given a five-year sentence but that was reduced to three years on appeal, and they were released again on August 18, 1960.

María Teresa was not intimidated by political confrontation saying, “Life is risked without thinking about possible personal benefits, since the main reason for which we fight is the complete cancellation of privileges [...] perhaps what is closest to us is death, but that idea does not intimidate me: we will continue fighting for what is just."

== Murders ==
On November 25, 1960, when three of the sisters, Minerva, Patria and María Teresa, were returning from visiting the prison holding their husbands, who were leaders of the June 14 Revolutionary Movement, the women were ambushed by agents of the Military Intelligence Service (SIM) outside of Puerto Plata. Each was fiercely strangled and beaten to death, as was their driver Rufino de la Cruz. At that time, Patria was 36 years old, Minerva was 34, and María Teresa was 25.

Their bodies were found with the vehicle, destroyed at the bottom of a ravine. While the crime scene was meant to indicate that the sisters and driver died in the "accidental fall," it became widely assumed that their deaths were an "arranged car accident" ordered by the dictator and became a source of national outrage and called "the last straw for the Dominican people."

== Aftermath ==
According to historian Bernard Diederich, the assassinations of the Mirabal sisters "had greater effect on Dominicans than most of Trujillo's other crimes." The killings, he wrote, "did something to their machismo" and paved the way for Trujillo's own assassination six months later on May 30, 1961.

In the Caribbean country today, the sisters are remembered as "symbols of both popular and feminist resistance."

== Tributes ==
Every year on November 25, the three sisters, Minerva, Patria and María Teresa, are honored on the International Day to Eliminate Violence against Women, which was declared by the UN in their honor.

Commemorations of all three sisters (called martyrs by some) have so far included many poems, songs and books, including Julia Alvarez's second novel In the Time of the Butterflies (1994), which was adapted into a film in 2001.

== See also ==
- Mirabal sisters
