= Minerva Mirabal Reyes =

Dominican lawyer and political activist

- Born: María Argentina Minerva Mirabal Reyes; 12 March 1926; Salcedo, Dominican Republic
- Died: 25 November 1960 (aged 34)
- Occupation: Political activist
- Spouse(s): Manolo Tavárez Justo; Rafael Taveras
- Children: 1
- Relatives: Patria Mirabal; María Teresa Mirabal

María Minerva Mirabal Reyes (March 12, 1926 –November 25, 1960), or Minerva, was a Dominican political activist and revolutionary. She was the third of the Mirabal sisters, Minerva and her sisters began to speak out against the oppressive dictatorship of Generalissimo Rafael Leonidas Trujillo and conducted clandestine activities against his regime. Like her older sisters, Minerva also received an education at El Colegio Inmaculada Concepción, at the urging of her mother, Mercedes Mirabal.

Many resistance groups were forming within the Dominican Republic during the 1950s. Minerva and her husband, Manolo Tavárez Justo, were pioneers in the resistance movement against Trujillo. Together, they formed the 14th of June Revolutionary Movement.

== Education and early life ==
Minerva Mirabal was born in the town of Salcedo, Dominican Republic to Mercedes Reyes Camilo and Enrique Mirabal. When she was 22, Minerva had a personal experience with Trujillo, at an elitist party. She and her family were invited to, turning down his sexual advances, causing her to be jailed and not able to practice her law degree. Minerva’s parents feared that her involvement with politics would ultimately get her killed so they did not allow her to register for law school, especially following her rejection of Trujillo. This resulted in house arrest at her parents' home where she spent her time painting and writing poetry about the injustices she had endured due to the exploitation and dictatorship in her country. Six years later, however, they changed their minds after realizing how upset this made Minerva, leading to her enrollment at the University of Santo Domingo, where she graduated summa cum laude. She was the first woman to graduate from law school in the Dominican Republic.

== Activism ==
Amidst the Trujillo regime, resistance groups were forming within the Dominican Republic and among Dominicans who lived abroad. While the majority of the members of the movement were men, many women, including the Mirabal sisters, joined. Minerva and her husband, Manolo, were pioneers in the resistance movement against Trujillo. Together, they formed the 14th of June Movement in 1959. They named it after a failed revolt against Trujillo’s government which was led by exiled Dominicans.

Following the formation of this resistance movement, numerous arrests of resistance figures and their families occurred at the hands of Trujillo and his regime. Eventually the women who were incarcerated, including the Mirabal sisters, were freed as a gesture of leniency from Trujillo. Their husbands, however, remained incarcerated.

== Personal life ==
Minerva was married to Manuel Aurelio Tavárez Justo, or Manolo, whom she attended school with and met while on vacation in Jarabacoa in 1954. Manolo was also a law student who joined her in her revolutionaries. They married and had two children, Minerva Josefina in November 1955, and Manuel Enrique, in January 1960.

== Assassination ==
On November 25, 1960, Minerva and her two sisters, Patria and Maria Teresa, along with their driver, were killed by Trujillo's secret police. They were stopped, beaten and strangled to death. The police then faked a car accident to cover up the assassination. The Mirabal sisters were on their way home from visiting their husbands in prison at the time of their death. The fourth Mirabal sister, Dede, was not with them at the time of their death. The assassinations of the Mirabal sisters, who were also known as The Butterflies, acted as a catalyst for the downfall of Trujillo's regime, which ended about a year after their deaths, because of their national popularity. Their deaths were considered one of the most heinous acts committed during the Trujillo dictatorship.

== Legacy ==
After the death of the three Mirabal sisters, their legacy has been commemorated due to the large amount of gender-based violence within Latin America. In 1981, the day of their death was turned into a day dedicated to the fight against women's violence. The United Nations has also designated November 25 to be memorialized as International Day for the Elimination of Violence against Women.

Their story also inspired the novel In the Time of the Butterflies, written in 1994 by Julia Álvarez and eventually adapted into a film in 2001.
