= In the Time of the Butterflies =

1994 novel by Julia Alvarez

- First edition
- Author: Julia Alvarez
- Original title: In the Time of the Butterflies
- Translator: Rolando Costa Picazo
- Language: English and Spanish language
- Genre: Historical Fiction
- Publisher: Algonquin Books of Chapel Hill
- Publication date: 1994 (English); 2001 (Spanish)
- Publication place: United States
- Media type: Print (hardback & paperback)
- Pages: 344 pp (first edition, hardback) 427 pp (paperback/Spanish)
- ISBN: 978-1-56512-038-9 (first edition, hardback)
- OCLC: 30319222
- Dewey Decimal: 813/.54 20
- LC Class: PS3551.L845 I5 1994

In the Time of the Butterflies is a historical fiction novel by Julia Alvarez, relating a fictionalized account of the Mirabal sisters during the time of the Trujillo dictatorship in the Dominican Republic. The book is written in the first and third person, by and about the Mirabal sisters, who called themselves the "Butterflies," after Minerva Mirabal's code name. First published in 1994, the story was adapted into a feature film in 2001.

== Characters ==
Minerva: The third Mirabal sister, and certainly the most headstrong. She is focused on law school, and succeeds in completing it as an adult, although Trujillo withholds her law license as revenge. She has a brief romance with the revolutionary leader "Lio" before she meets Manolo in law school (also a revolutionary) and marries him. She has two children, a daughter Minou and a son Manolito.

Dedé: Dede is the second Mirabal sister. She is not as certain about the revolution as her sisters and feels weaker because of that fact. She doesn't want to join the revolution because she believes that it will lead to death, so she doesn't. She uses her husband, Jaimito, as the reason she doesn't officially join. He doesn't want her involved in the revolution, and the conflict almost destroys their marriage. She is constantly worried about her sisters, telling them they'll be killed. She has children, all boys, Enrique, Rafael, and David. In the end, she is the only survivor of her three sisters.

María Teresa: The youngest of the four Mirabal sisters, she is very materialistic. She marries Leandro and has one daughter, named Jacqueline. She joined the revolution while she was living with her sister Minerva. She joined because she wanted to feel worthy of Leandro. She writes in a diary form in her chapters.

Patria: The oldest of the Mirabal sisters, she is very religious. While looking for her calling from God, she instead finds her husband, Pedrito, whom she marries at age 16. Her faith wavers intensely as a young woman. She takes the miscarriage of her third child as God's punishment towards her, which drives her further into a religious depression. She later regains her faith on a pilgrimage to Higüey that she takes with her mother and sisters. She has three children: Nelson, Noris, and Raul Ernesto. She is also a revolutionary, starting a Christian revolutionary group and merging it with her sister Minerva's revolutionary group. Also, her tone went from being a little confusing in the beginning and losing her relationship with her family to becoming more connected to her family.

Trujillo: Rafael Leonidas Trujillo, also known as "El Jefe" ("the Chief"), is the main antagonist of the novel. He is the self-appointed dictator of the Dominican Republic. A harsh ruler, he demands complete obedience from everyone and commits many cruel and unjust acts against his people, such as imprisonment without trial, confiscating land, possessions, and torture. Though married, he has many affairs with young girls who he keeps in houses around the country. He is also identified as a rapist. As his regime falls apart, he becomes even more vicious and cruel and eventually has the Mirabal sisters (all except for Dede) killed when they become too much of an opposition to his decaying power.

Mamá: Mother to the Mirabal girls, and married to Papa. She takes care of the girls and is always worried about them. Despite being the matriarch of a plantation with servants, she is described as illiterate.

Papá: Father to the Mirabal girls, and married to Mama. He heads the family store.

Pedrito González: A farmer. He married Patria Mirabal when she was 16, on February 24, 1947. He and his wife eventually join the revolution, along with their son, Nelson. He is later imprisoned, along with his brothers-in-law, Leandro and Manolo, for participating in the revolution. He and Patria have three children: Nelson, Noris, and Raulito.

Manolo: A law student when he first arrives in the novel, Manolo is Minerva's husband. Manolo emerges as a leader of the revolution and is chosen as president of the June 14 movement.

Fela: A worker for the Mirabal family who claims to be a fortune teller. After the girls die, she claims to be possessed by them. Minou goes to Fela for a time to "talk" to her mother after her death.

Minou: One of Minerva's children, Minou was born in 1956. Like her mother, she is strong-willed and independent.

Don Manuel: Trujillo's right-hand man. Manuel is very "tall and dapper" (page 110). He is a corrupt politician, like many of Trujillo's cronies. Manuel does many of Trujillo's odd jobs, such as delivering messages and threats for him.

Virgilio: Virgilio Morales, nicknamed "Lio". He is a revolutionary, but unlike most, he is not underground. He speaks out publicly against the government, which is considered suicide. Lio was forced into hiding because of his actions against the government. He was very close to Minerva before he fled the country. He asked her to flee with him but Minerva did not get the letter in time because Dede burned his first letter and Minerva's father hid the following letters from her.

Jaimito: Jaimito is Dede's husband and cousin. Jaimito and Dede live on his farm after they are married. He is opposed to his wife's family's involvement in the revolution and forbids her to join. When he and Dede were first married he was kind, but over the years he and Dede drift apart. He cares deeply for his boys.

Sinita: Minerva's good friend, whom she met at Inmaculada Catholic School for Girls. She later goes to Santo Domingo and becomes a revolutionary, just like Minerva. All the men in Sinita's' family were killed by Trujillo, the last when she was a young girl, anchoring her deep-seated hatred of Trujillo.

Rufino de la Cruz: The Mirabals' driver whenever they rented a car to go over the mountains to visit their husbands in prison, he was very loyal to the "butterflies", and they trusted him wholeheartedly. He has a wife and one child. He was murdered along with the Three Mirabal sisters.

== Reception ==
The book was nominated for the 1994 National Book Critics Circle Award.

The Port Washington School District in Port Washington, NY banned this book because it has a detailed diagram depicting how to construct a bomb. Two Schreiber High School students opposed this ban in a New York Times opinion piece, arguing: "We believe that the purpose of education is to expose students to all areas of reality so that we can make our own judgments. Isn't that why we are able to read Romeo and Juliet without committing suicide, or The Lord of the Flies without being violent? We should not ban a powerful piece of literature just because of a diagram."

In the Time of the Butterflies is a selection of The Big Read, the National Endowment for the Arts' community-wide reading program, and of "Readers Round Table"(Algonquin).

== Connection to historical events ==
The idea behind In the Time of the Butterflies originated in the 1960s when author Julia Alvarez was in the Dominican Republic. The Mirabal sisters had been murdered just three months after her father got involved with the underground against Trujillo.
