= Mirabal sisters =

Dominican political protestors killed in 1960

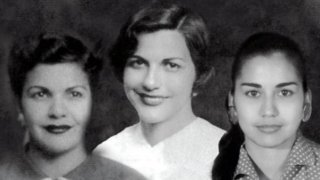
Patria, Minerva, and María Teresa Mirabal.

The Mirabal sisters (Spanish: hermanas Mirabal [eɾˈmanas miɾaˈβal]) were four sisters from the Dominican Republic, three of whom (Patria, Minerva and María Teresa) opposed the dictatorship of Rafael Trujillo (el Jefe) and were involved in activities against his regime. The three sisters were assassinated on 25 November 1960. The last sister, Adela (known as Dedé), who was not involved in political activities at the time, died of natural causes on 1 February 2014.

Of the sisters, Minerva was the one who had the most active role in politics. She and her husband Manolo Tavárez Justo founded the 14 June Revolutionary Movement. María Teresa also became involved in the movement. The oldest sister, Patria, did not have the same level of political activity as her other sisters, but she supported them. She lent her house to store weapons and tools from the insurgents.

The sisters are considered national heroines of the Dominican Republic. Their remains rest in a mausoleum that was declared an extension of the National Pantheon, located in the Hermanas Mirabal House-Museum, the sisters' last residence. The assassinations turned the Mirabal sisters into "symbols of both popular and feminist resistance". In 1999, in their honor, the United Nations General Assembly designated 25 November as the International Day for the Elimination of Violence against Women.

== The Mirabal sisters ==
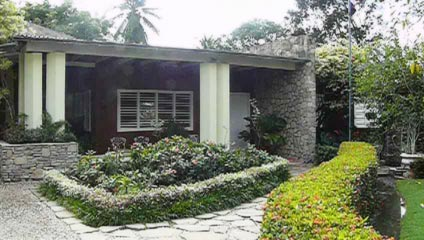
The house in which the Mirabal sisters lived in 1960 is now a museum in Salcedo, Dominican Republic.

The Mirabal family were from the central Cibao region of the Dominican Republic and had a farm in the village of Ojo de Agua, near the town of Salcedo. Their parents Enrique Mirabal Fernández and Mercedes Reyes Camilo were landowners in the area. All four sisters attended primary school in their village, Ojo de Agua, and attended a Catholic boarding school, el Colegio Inmaculada Concepción, for their secondary education in the city of La Vega. Once Rafael Trujillo took power it was customary to have a picture of him in the household; the Mirabal house, however, never had a picture of Trujillo and were subsequently considered dissidents by the Trujillo regime.

When Trujillo came to power, the family lost almost their entire fortune. The sisters, especially Minerva, believed that the dictatorship was ruining the country, so they participated in the creation and organization of the 14 June Revolutionary Movement. Within this group, they were known as Las Mariposas (The Butterflies). Two of the sisters, Minerva and María Teresa, were imprisoned on several occasions in both the La Victoria and La 40 prisons. They and their husbands were subjected to torture during the Trujillo regime. Despite these facts, they continued to fight against the dictatorship.

=== Patria Mercedes Mirabal Reyes ===
Patria Mercedes Mirabal Reyes (27 February 1924 – 25 November 1960), commonly known as Patria, was the oldest of the four Mirabal sisters. When she was 14, she was sent by her parents to a Catholic boarding school, Colegio Inmaculada Concepción, in La Vega. She left school when she was 17 and married Pedro González, a farmer, who would later aid her in challenging the Trujillo regime.

Patria had three children. She once said "We cannot allow our children to grow up in this corrupt and tyrannical regime. We have to fight against it, and I am willing to give up everything, even my life if necessary."

=== Bélgica Adela Mirabal Reyes ===
Bélgica Adela Mirabal Reyes (1 March 1925 – 1 February 2014), commonly known as Dedé, was the second daughter of the Mirabal family. Unlike her sisters, she did not attend college. Instead, she became a traditional homemaker, and helped her father with the family business. The Mirabal patriarch, Enrique, died after his political imprisonment, and Dedé took over the family finances. She did not become involved with her sisters' political work. After the murder of her sisters, Dedé took care of their children and raised them. Between 1992 and 1994, Dedé started the Mirabal Sisters Foundation and the Mirabal Sisters Museum to continue her sisters' legacy. Dedé was the last surviving sister of the family. She died at the age of 88, and professed her entire life that it was her destiny to survive so that she was able to "tell their story".

=== María Argentina Minerva Mirabal Reyes ===
María Argentina Minerva Mirabal Reyes (12 March 1926 – 25 November 1960), commonly known as Minerva, was the third daughter. At the age of 12, she followed Patria to the Colegio Inmaculada Concepción. In 1949, the Mirabal family was invited to a party for the local elite where Minerva first caught the eye of Rafael Trujillo, so much so that the Mirabals were invited to a different party by Trujillo himself. At this party, Trujillo made more sexual advances toward Minerva. After Minerva's rejection of Trujillo, her parents prohibited Minerva from registering for law school due to concerns that she would get involved in politics and ultimately be killed. However, after seeing how upset Minerva was, her parents relented six years later and she enrolled at the University of Santo Domingo, where she later graduated summa cum laude. Minerva was the first woman to graduate from law school in the Dominican Republic. Due to her previous rejection of Trujillo's advances, when Minerva graduated, her diploma was stripped of her honors and her license to practice law was ultimately turned down.

At university, she met her husband, Manolo Tavárez Justo, who would help her fight the Trujillo regime. Minerva was the most vocal and radical of the Mirabal daughters. According to the theologian Nancy Pineda-Madrid, she was arrested and harassed on multiple occasions on orders given by Trujillo himself. According to the historian Bernard Diederich, Minerva Mirabal was arrested twice. She was first jailed in January 1960, at the start of the wave of repression of 1J4 members where "hundreds of 1J4 members are rounded up and tortured". She stated, "It is a source of happiness to do whatever can be done for our country that suffers so many anguishes. It is sad to stay with one's arms crossed."

=== Antonia María Teresa Mirabal Reyes ===
Antonia María Teresa Mirabal Reyes (15 October 1935 – 25 November 1960), commonly known as María Teresa, was the fourth and youngest of the Mirabal sisters. She attended the Colegio Inmaculada Concepción, graduated from the Liceo de San Francisco de Macorís in 1954, and went on to the University of Santo Domingo, where she studied mathematics.

Later in her life, María Teresa dated Leandro Guzmán. While dating, before Leandro was allowed to hold María Teresa's hand, she asked him how his family felt about Trujillo. Leandro responded, "... there's no problem. At home, that was the first thing I learned... to hate Trujillo." After this response María Teresa let him hold her hand and they eventually married after she finished her education. María Teresa was influenced by her older sister Minerva's political views and was involved in the clandestine activities against Trujillo's regime. As a result, she was harassed and arrested on the direct orders of Trujillo. She greatly admired her older sister Minerva and became passionate about Minerva's political views. She once said, "Perhaps what we have most near is death, but that idea does not frighten me. We shall continue to fight for that which is just."

== Political activities ==
While attending the Colegio Inmaculada Concepción, Minerva discovered that her friend Deisi Ariza's father was killed by Trujillo for opposing the regime. This event along with many others ultimately influenced Minerva's fight against the regime. Minerva became involved in the political movement against Trujillo, who was the country's official president from 1930 to 1938 and from 1942 to 1952, but who continued to rule behind the scenes until his assassination in 1961. Minerva's sisters followed her into the movement: first María Teresa, who joined after staying at Minerva's house and learning about her activities, and then Patria, who joined after witnessing a massacre by some of Trujillo's men while on a religious retreat. Dedé did not join in, partly because her husband, Jaimito, did not want her to.

The husbands of Minerva, María Teresa, and Patria were among the leaders of 14 June Movement, nicknamed 1J4. The movement was created in support, and then in honor, of the Dominican rebels who were killed while attempting to overthrow the Rafael Trujillo regime. Everyone in the family, including Patria's teenage children, helped distribute pamphlets about the many people whom Trujillo had killed, and obtained materials for guns and bombs to use when they eventually openly revolted. Within the group, the sisters called themselves Las Mariposas ("The Butterflies"), after Minerva's underground name. The secret movement was discovered weeks after its founding leading to Patria's house (where the group met) being burned to the ground and María Teresa and Minerva's arrests.

In 1960, Minerva and María Teresa were incarcerated from 22 January to 7 February, then from 18 May to 9 August. They were not tortured due to mounting international opposition to Trujillo's regime. Patria was never arrested, but her husband and son were jailed. The three husbands were incarcerated in January at La Victoria Penitentiary in Santo Domingo, and then, in November, two of them were transferred to Puerto Plata.

In 1960, the Organization of American States condemned Trujillo's actions and sent observers. Minerva and María Teresa were freed, but their husbands remained in prison.

== Assassination ==
On 25 November 1960, Patria, Minerva, María Teresa, and their driver, Rufino de la Cruz, were visiting María Teresa and Minerva's incarcerated husbands. Patria's husband was not incarcerated but she traveled with her sisters as moral support. Returning home, they were stopped by Trujillo's henchmen. The sisters and De la Cruz were separated, strangled and clubbed to death. The bodies were placed in their vehicle, which was run off the mountain road in an attempt to make their deaths look like an accident.

After Trujillo was assassinated on 30 May 1961, General Pupo Román admitted to having personal knowledge that the sisters were killed by Victor Alicinio Peña Rivera (Trujillo's right-hand man) along with Ciriaco de la Rosa, Ramón Emilio Rojas, Alfonso Cruz Valeria, and Emilio Estrada Malleta, members of his secret police force. As to whether Trujillo ordered the killings or whether the secret police acted on its own, one historian wrote, "We know orders of this nature could not come from any authority lower than national sovereignty. That was none other than Trujillo himself; still less could it have taken place without his assent." Also, one of the murderers, Ciriaco de la Rosa, said "I tried to prevent the disaster, but I could not because if I had he, Trujillo, would have killed us all."

== Aftermath ==
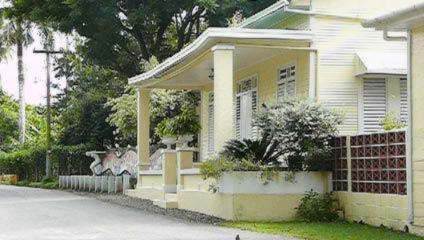
The old house of the Mirabal family and the residence of Dedé Mirabal until her death on 1 February 2014, aged 88.

According to historian Bernard Diederich, the sisters' assassinations "had greater effect on Dominicans than most of Trujillo's other crimes". The killings, he wrote, "did something to their machismo" and paved the way for Trujillo's own assassination six months later.

However, the details of the Mirabal sisters' assassinations were "treated gingerly at the official level" until 1996, when President Joaquín Balaguer was forced to step down after more than two decades in power. Balaguer was Trujillo's protégé and had been president in 1960 at the time of the assassinations, despite having "distanced himself from General Trujillo and initially carved out a more moderate political stance."

A 1997 review of the history curriculum in public schools saw the Mirabals recognised as national martyrs. The post-Balaguer era has seen a marked increase in homages to the Mirabal sisters, including an exhibition of their belongings at the National Museum of History and Geography in Santo Domingo.

After the assassinations, the surviving sister, Dedé, devoted her life to the legacy of her sisters. She raised their six children, including Minou Tavárez Mirabal, Minerva's daughter, who has served as deputy for the National District in the lower house of the Dominican Congress since 2002 after a term as deputy foreign minister (1996–2000). Of Dedé's own three children, Jaime David Fernández Mirabal was Minister for Environment and Natural Resources and a former Vice-President. In 1992, Dedé established the Mirabal Sisters Foundation, and in 1994, opened the Mirabal Sisters Museum in their hometown, Salcedo. She published a book, Vivas en su Jardín, on 25 August 2009. Its English edition is announced for 25 February 2025. She lived in the house in Salcedo where the sisters were born until her death in 2014, aged 88.

== Legacy ==
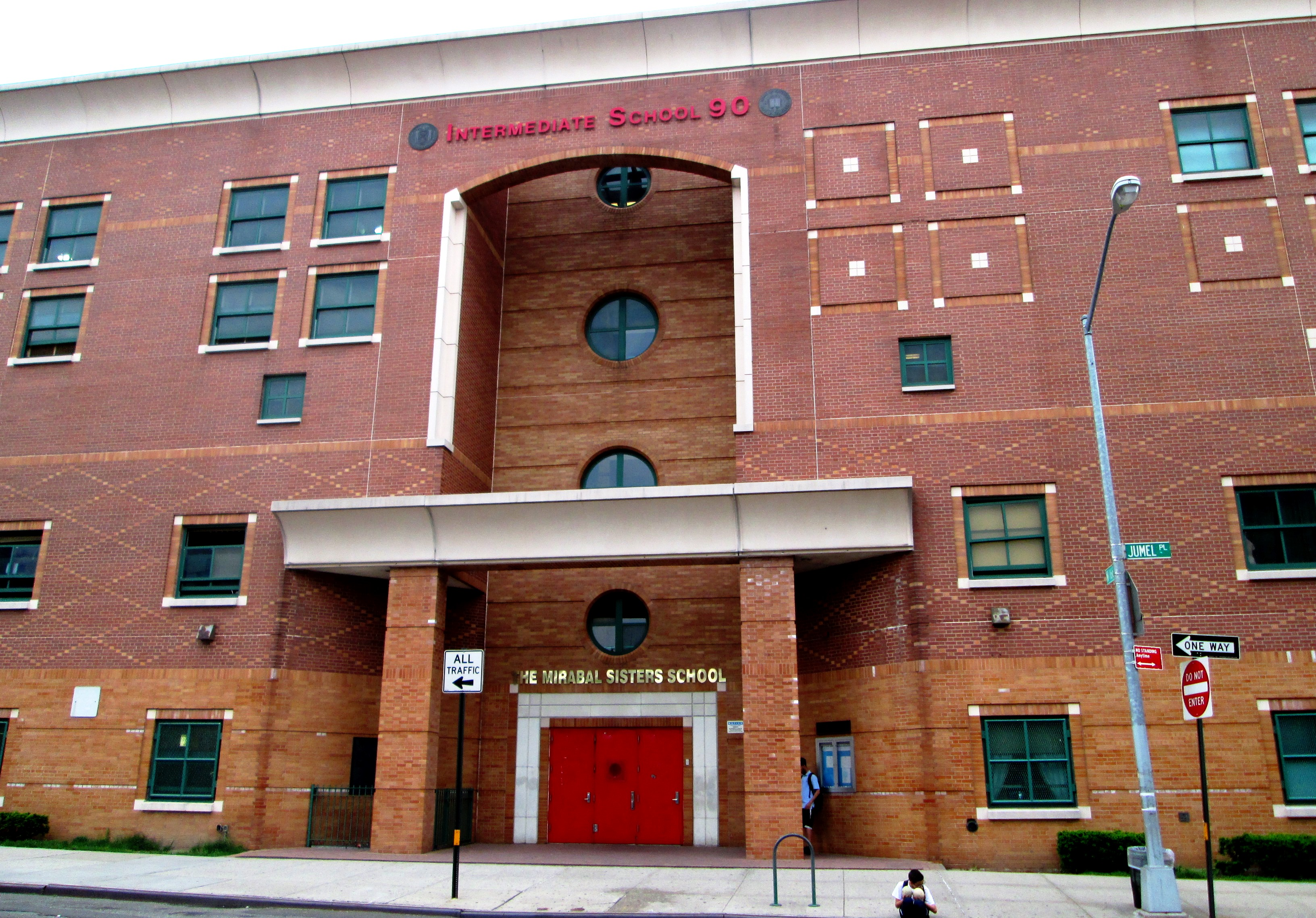
Mirabal Sisters Campus, housing KIPP Washington Heights, MS 319 Maria Teresa, and MS 324 Patria Mirabal, in the Washington Heights section of New York City

On 17 December 1999, the United Nations General Assembly designated 25 November as the International Day for the Elimination of Violence against Women in honor of the sisters. It marks the beginning of a 16-day period of Activism against Gender Violence. The last day of that period, 10 December, is International Human Rights Day. On 21 November 2007, Salcedo Province was renamed Hermanas Mirabal Province.

Hermanas Mirabal station of the Santo Domingo Metro is named to honor the Mirabal sisters. The 200 Dominican pesos bill features the sisters, and a stamp was issued in their memory. The 137-foot obelisk that Trujillo built in 1935 to commemorate the renaming of the capital city from Santo Domingo to Ciudad Trujillo has been covered with murals honoring the sisters. In 1997, the telecommunications company CODETEL (now Claro) sponsored a mural by Elsa Núñez. Every few years, the mural changes. In 2005, Amaya Salazar created one. In 2011, Banco del Progreso sponsored Dustin Muñoz to redo the mural.

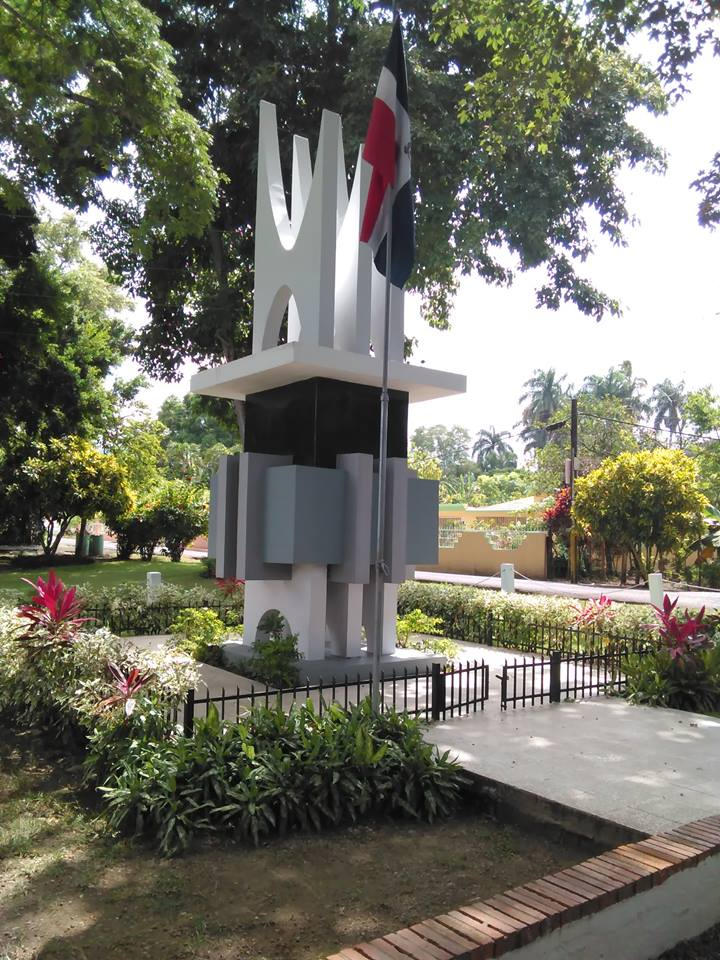
Monument in Honor of the sisters in Ojo de Agua, Salcedo

In 2019, the southeast corner of 168th street and Amsterdam Avenue in Washington Heights, New York City, US, was designated Mirabal Sisters Way by the Council of the City of New York. In addition, a school campus in Washington Heights is named Mirabal Sisters Campus.

In 2019, Time created 89 new covers to celebrate women of the year starting from 1920; it chose the three political Mirabal sisters for 1960.

Being globally recognized as a symbol of social justice and feminism, the sisters have inspired the creation of many organizations that focus on keeping their legacy alive through social actions. In 2021, Rosa Hernández de Grullón, Ambassador of the Dominican Republic in France, inaugurated a plaque in Paris in honor of the famous Dominican resistance fighters murdered under the Trujillo dictatorship in 1960. The Mirabal Sisters Cultural and Community Center, a non-profit organization that seeks to improve the status of immigrant families.

=== In popular culture ===
- In 1994, Dominican-American author Julia Alvarez published her novel In the Time of the Butterflies, a fictionalized account of the lives of the Mirabal sisters. Alvarez called the sisters "feminist icons" and "a reminder that we have our revolutionary heroines, our Che Guevaras, too". The novel was adapted into a 2001 movie of the same name, starring Salma Hayek as Minerva, Edward James Olmos as Trujillo, and singer Marc Anthony in a supporting role.
- The sisters are mentioned in The Brief Wondrous Life of Oscar Wao, a 2007 novel by Dominican-American writer Junot Díaz.
- The story is fictionalized in the children's book How the Butterflies Grew Their Wings by Jacob Kushner.
- Chilean filmmaker Cecilia Domeyko produced Code Name: Butterflies, a documentary about the Mirabal sisters. It contains interviews with Dedé and other members of the Mirabal family.
- Actress Michelle Rodriguez co-produced the film Trópico de Sangre, which recounts the lives of the sisters. She also starred in the film as Minerva. Dedé Mirabal participated in the development of the film.
- Mario Vargas Llosa's 2000 novel, The Feast of the Goat, portrays the assassination of Trujillo and its effect on the lives of Dominicans. It refers often to the Mirabal sisters. It was originally published as La fiesta del chivo in Spain by Alfaguara.
- Jon M. Chu's 2021 movie In The Heights (based on the musical of the same name) references the Mirabal sisters.

=== Streets named in their memory ===
In the Dominican Republic

- Esperanza
- Hato del Yaque
- Puerto Plata
- Salcedo
- Santiago de los Caballeros
- Santo Domingo
- Tamboril

In Spain

- Alaquàs
- Albacete
- Burgos
- Mairena del Aljarafe

== See also ==
- Women in the Dominican Republic
- Virgins of Galindo
- Villa sisters
