= Loida Maritza Pérez =

American novelist

- Born: 1963 (age 62–63); Dominican Republic
- Occupation: Author

Loida Maritza Pérez (born 1963) is a Dominican American author. She is most known for her 1999 novel Geographies of Home.

== Biography ==
Loida Maritza Pérez was born in the Dominican Republic in 1963. Rafael Trujillo's reign over the island had ended two years prior and the nation's political status was uncertain, leading many families to emigrate. Loida Maritza Pérez's family left for the United States when she was three years old, where they settled in the Bronx in New York City. She grew up in the Bronx and the location features heavily in her writings.

== Career ==
Loida Maritza Pérez began her writing career as an undergraduate at Cornell. During an autobiographical class then taught by Henry Louise Gates, she produced the short story that became her novel Geographies of Home (1999). She has also taught writing workshops and contributed to the publications Bomb, Latina, and Callaloo. Her writing has drawn comparisons to other Dominican American writers of her generation such as Angie Cruz, Nelly Rosario, and Junot Díaz, a group that is often seen as following in the footsteps of writer Julia Álvarez. Loida Maritza Pérez's works deal with the themes of intergenerational trauma, diaspora, displacement, and more. She has received awards for her work from the New York Foundation for the Arts, Pauline and Henry Louis Gates fellowship, El Diario, and Ucross Foundation.
