= Vitarroz =

- Founded: 1955; 70 years ago
- Headquarters: Kearny, New Jersey, United States
- Owner: Carlos Gomez (from 2009)
- Website: vitarroz.com

Vitarroz, founded in 1955, is the second largest supplier and distributor of Hispanic food products in the Northeastern United States. The company is based in Kearny, New Jersey.

The company's product line comprises over 300 branded products, including rice, beans, beverages, and other products.

In August 2009, the Vitarroz brand was purchased by Dominican-American calling card magnate Carlos Gomez.
