= Sherwood Anderson Foundation =

The Sherwood Anderson Foundation is an organization founded by the children and grandchildren of American short story writer and novelist Sherwood Anderson that gives grants to emerging writers. The most notable of these is the annual Sherwood Anderson Foundation Writers Award.

As of 2009 the Foundation's co-presidents were Anderson's grandsons Michael and David Spear.

== Award recipients ==
Winners of the award have ranged from college undergraduates to widely published authors. Currently, only individuals who have published either "a book of fiction or a collection of short stories in major literary and/or commercial publications" are eligible for the prize.

The winners of the grants include:

- 1988 – Valerie S. Golightly
- 1989 – King Andrews
- 1990 – Gillian Kim Ashley & Pamela Johnson
- 1991 – Karen Coats
- 1992 – Patricia Snell
- 1993 – Dawn Radford
- 1994 – Debra Allbery Gildea
- 1995 – Randall Kenan
- 1996 – Ron Rash
- 1997 – Gail Pollock
- 1998 – Kamil Turowski
- 1999 – Tammy Greenwood
- 2000 – Paola Corso
- 2001 – Doug Crandell
- 2002 – Joseph Bathanti
- 2003 – Peggy Payne
- 2004 – Mary Beth Caschetta
- 2005 – Jacob M. Appel
- 2006 – Karen Fisher
- 2007 – Robert Garner McBrearty
- 2008 – Nelly Rosario
- 2009 – Lucy Jane Bledsoe
- 2010 – Tracy Winn
- 2011 – William Lychack
- 2012 – Katherine Min
- 2013 - Tupelo Hassman
- 2014 - Kristopher Jansma

== See also ==
- List of American literary awards
