= Julia Alvarez =

American poet, novelist, and essayist (born 1950)

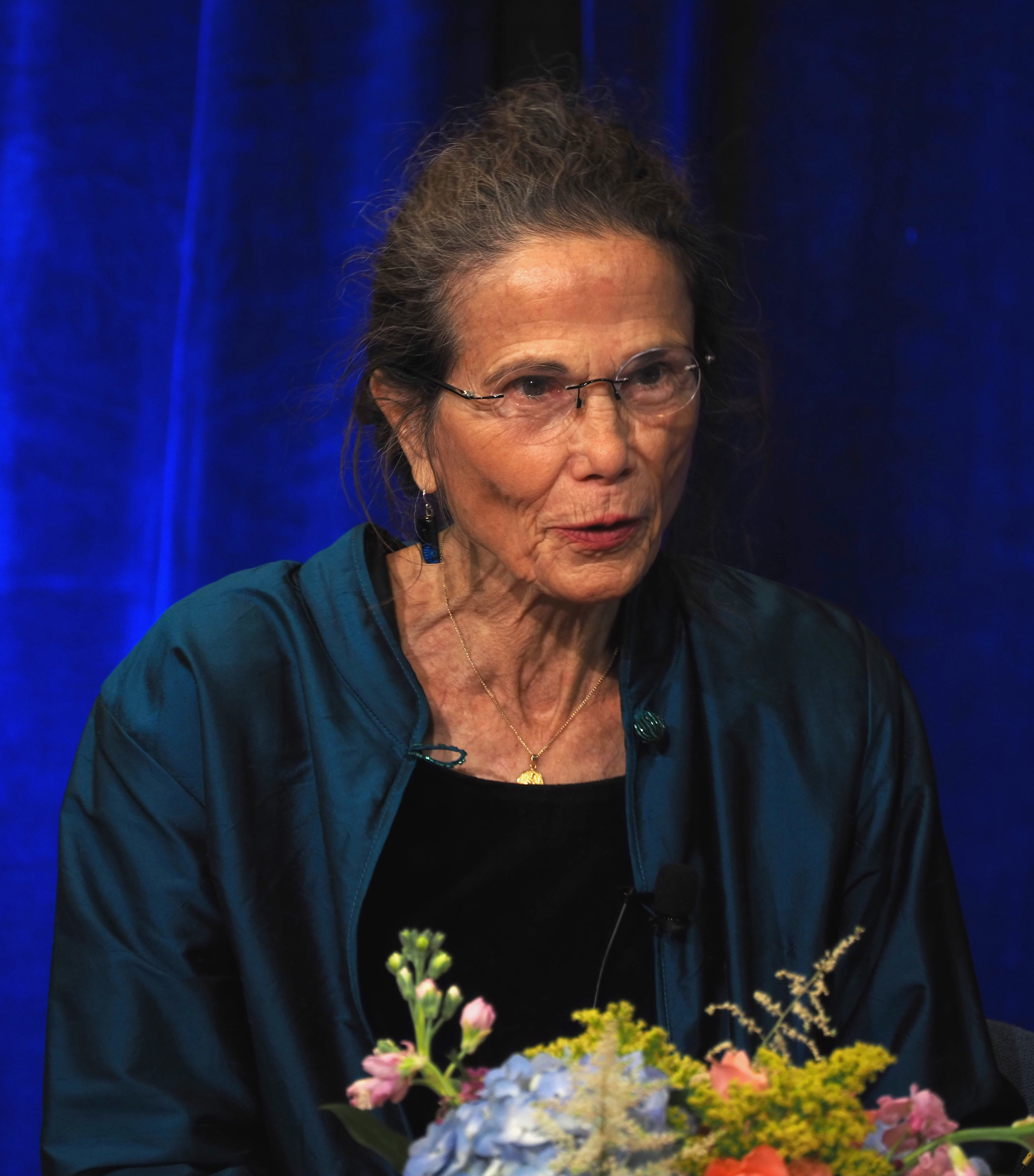
- Alvarez in 2026
- Born: March 27, 1950 (age 76); New York City, U.S.
- Education: Connecticut College, Syracuse University, Middlebury College
- Spouse: Bill Eichner (1989–present)
- Writing career
- Language: English
- Notable works: In the Time of the Butterflies; How the García Girls Lost Their Accents; Before We Were Free; A Gift of Gracias; A Wedding in Haiti
- Notable awards: National Medal of Arts (2014)
- Website: www.juliaalvarez.com

Julia Alvarez (born March 27, 1950) is an American New Formalist poet, novelist, and essayist. She rose to prominence with the novels How the García Girls Lost Their Accents (1991), In the Time of the Butterflies (1994), and Yo! (1997). Her publications as a poet include Homecoming (1984) and The Woman I Kept to Myself (2004), and as an essayist the autobiographical compilation Something to Declare (1998). She has achieved critical and commercial success on an international scale and many literary critics regard her to be one of the most significant contemporary Latina writers.

Julia Alvarez has also written several books for younger readers. Her first picture book for children was "The Secret Footprints" published in 2002. Alvarez has gone on to write several other books for young readers, including the "Tía Lola" book series.

Born in New York, she spent the first ten years of her childhood in the Dominican Republic, until her father's involvement in a political rebellion forced her family to flee the country. Many of Alvarez's works are influenced by her experiences as a Dominican-American, and focus heavily on issues of immigration, assimilation, and identity. She is known for works that examine cultural expectations of women both in the Dominican Republic and the United States, and for rigorous investigations of cultural stereotypes. In recent years, Alvarez has expanded her subject matter with works such as 'In the Name of Salomé (2000)', a novel with Cuban rather than solely Dominican characters and fictionalized versions of historical figures.

In addition to her successful writing career, Alvarez is the current writer-in-residence at Middlebury College.

== Biography ==
=== Early life and education ===
Julia Alvarez was born in 1950 in New York City. When she was three months old, her family moved back to the Dominican Republic, where they lived for the next ten years. She attended the Carol Morgan School. She grew up with her extended family in sufficient comfort to enjoy the services of maids. Critic Silvio Sirias believes that Dominicans value a talent for story-telling; Alvarez developed this talent early and was "often called upon to entertain guests". In 1960, the family was forced to flee to the United States after her father participated in a failed plot to overthrow the island's military dictator, Rafael Trujillo, circumstances which would later be revisited in her writing: her novel How the García Girls Lost Their Accents, for example, portrays a family that is forced to leave the Dominican Republic in similar circumstances, and in her poem, "Exile", she describes "the night we fled the country" and calls the experience a "loss much larger than I understood".

Alvarez's transition from the Dominican Republic to the United States was difficult; Sirias comments that she "lost almost everything: a homeland, a language, family connections, a way of understanding, and a warmth". She experienced alienation, homesickness, and prejudice in her new surroundings. In How the Garcia Girls Lost Their Accents, a character asserts that trying to raise "consciousness [in the Dominican Republic]... would be like trying for cathedral ceilings in a tunnel".

As one of the few Latin American students in her Catholic school, Alvarez faced discrimination because of her heritage. This caused her to turn inward and led to her fascination with literature, which she called "a portable homeland". She was encouraged by many of her teachers to pursue writing, and from a young age, was certain that this was what she wanted to do with her life. At the age of 13, her parents sent her to Abbot Academy, a boarding school, because the local schools were not considered sufficient. As a result, her relationship with her parents suffered, and was further strained when every summer she returned to the Dominican Republic to "reinforce their identities not only as Dominicans but also as proper young lady". These intermittent exchanges between countries informed her cultural understanding, the basis of many of her works.

After graduating from Abbot Academy in 1967, she attended Connecticut College from 1967 to 1969 (where she won the Benjamin T. Marshall Poetry Prize) and then transferred to Middlebury College, where she obtained her Bachelor of Arts degree, summa cum laude and Phi Beta Kappa (1971). She then received a master's degree in creative writing from Syracuse University (1975).

=== Career ===
After acquiring a master's degree in 1975, Alvarez took a position as a writer-in-residence for the Kentucky Arts Commission. She traveled throughout the state visiting elementary schools, high schools, colleges and communities, conducting writing workshops and giving readings. She attributes these years with providing her a deeper understanding of America and helping her realize her passion for teaching. After her work in Kentucky, she extended her educational endeavors to California, Delaware, North Carolina, Massachusetts, Washington, D.C., and Illinois.

Alvarez was a Visiting Assistant Professor of English for the University of Vermont, in Burlington, Vermont, for a two-year appointment in creative writing, 1981–83. She taught fiction and poetry workshops, introductory and advanced (for upperclassmen and graduate students) as well as a course on fiction (lecture format, 45 students).

In addition to writing, Alvarez holds the position of writer-in-residence at Middlebury College, where she teaches creative writing on a part-time basis. Alvarez currently resides in the Champlain Valley in Vermont. She has served as a panelist, consultant, and editor, as a judge for literary awards such as the PEN/Newman's Own First Amendment Award and the Casa de las Américas Prize, and also gives readings and lectures across the country. She and her partner, Bill Eichner, an ophthalmologist, created Alta Gracia, a farm-literacy center dedicated to the promotion of environmental sustainability and literacy and education worldwide. Alvarez and her husband purchased the farm in 1996 with the intent to promote cooperative and independent coffee-farming in the Dominican Republic. Alvarez is part of Border of Lights, an activist group that encourages positive relations between Haiti and the Dominican Republic.

== Literary writing ==
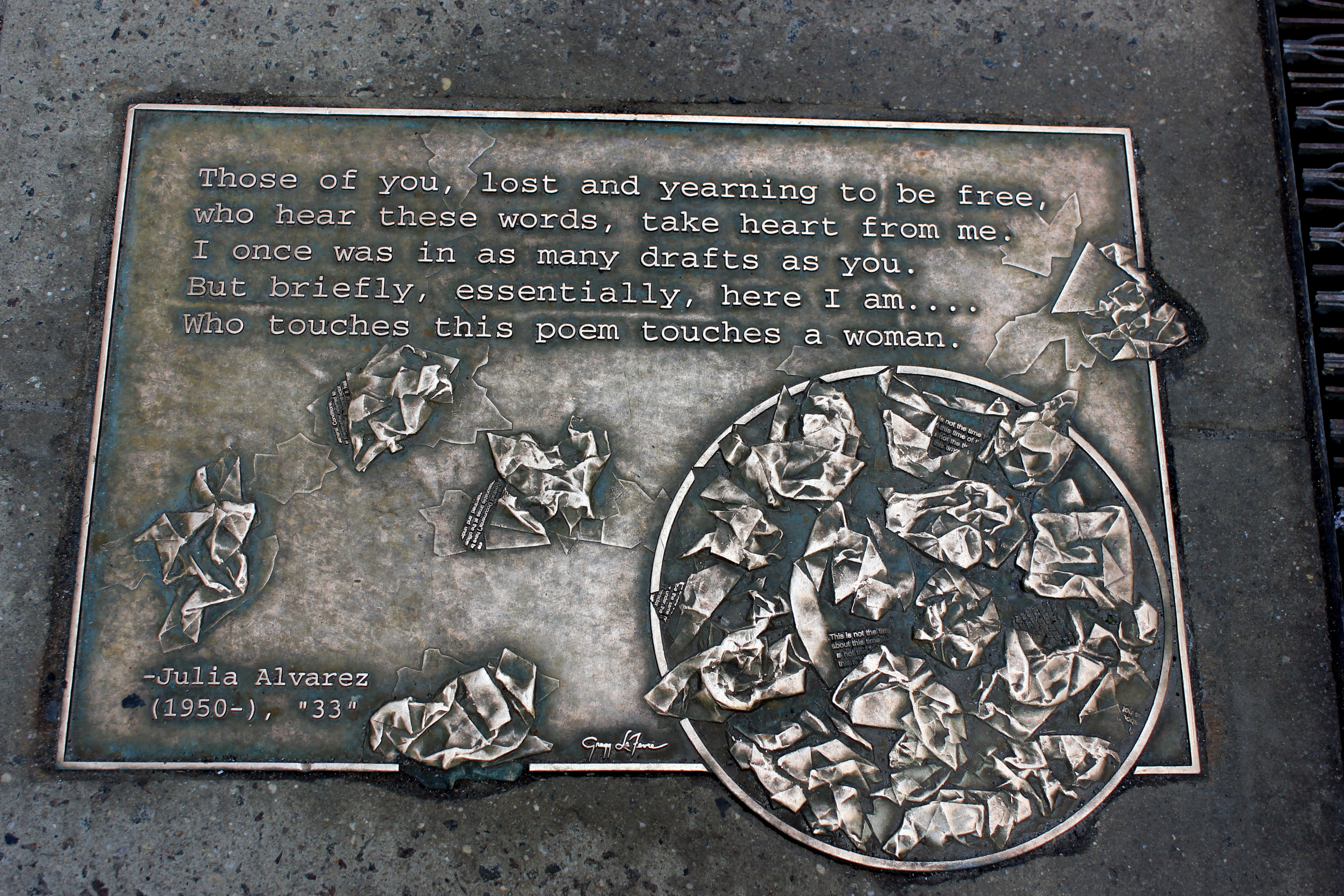
"Who touches this poem touches a woman"

Alvarez is regarded as one of the most critically and commercially successful Latina writers of her time. Her published works include five novels, a book of essays, three collections of poetry, four children's books, and two works of adolescent fiction.

Among her first published works were collections of poetry; The Homecoming, published in 1984, was expanded and republished in 1996. Poetry was Alvarez's first form of creative writing and she explains that her love for poetry has to do with the fact that "a poem is very intimate, heart-to-heart".

Alvarez's poetry celebrates and questions nature and the rituals of family life, (including domestic chores) a theme in her well known poem "Dusting." Nuances of asphyxiated family life such as exile, assimilation, identity, and social class ebb and flow passionately through her poems.

Alvarez found inspiration for her work from a small painting from 1894 by Pierre Bonnard called The Circus Rider. Her poems, critic Elizabeth Coonrod Martínez suggests, give voice to the immigrant struggle.

How the García Girls Lost Their Accents, Alvarez's first novel, was published in 1991, and was soon widely acclaimed. It is the first major novel written in English by a Dominican author. A largely personal novel, the book details themes of cultural hybridization and the struggles of a post-colonial Dominican Republic. Alvarez illuminates the integration of the Latina immigrant into the U.S. mainstream and shows that identity can be deeply affected by gender, ethnic, and class differences. She uses her own experiences to illustrate deep cultural contrasts between the Caribbean and the United States. So personal was the material in the novel, that for months after it was published, her mother refused to speak with her; her sisters were also not pleased with the book. The book has sold over 250,000 copies, and was cited as an American Library Association Notable Book.

Released in 1994, her second novel, In the Time of the Butterflies, has a historical premise and elaborates on the death of the Mirabal sisters during the time of the Trujillo dictatorship in the Dominican Republic. In 1960, their bodies were found at the bottom of a cliff on the north coast of the island, and it is said they were a part of a revolutionary movement to overthrow the oppressive regime of the country at the time. These legendary figures are referred to as Las Mariposas, or The Butterflies. This story portrays women as strong characters who have the power to alter the course of history, demonstrating Alvarez's affinity for strong female protagonists and anti-colonial movements. As Alvarez has explained:

"I hope that through this fictionalized story I will bring acquaintance of these famous sisters to English speaking readers. November 25, the day of their murders is observed in many Latin American countries as the International Day Against Violence Toward Women. Obviously, these sisters, who fought one tyrant, have served as models for women fighting against injustices of all kinds."

In 1997, Alvarez published Yo!, a sequel to How the García Girls Lost Their Accents, which focuses solely on the character of Yolanda. Drawing from her own experiences, Alvarez portrays the success of a writer who uses her family as the inspiration for her work. Yo! could be considered Alvarez's musings and criticism of her own literary success. Alvarez's opinions on the hybridization of culture are often conveyed through the use of Spanish-English malapropisms, or Spanglish; such expressions are especially prominent in How the García Girls Lost Their Accents. Alvarez describes the language of the character of Laura as "a mishmash of mixed-up idioms and sayings". In 1998 her short story "The Rudy Elmenhurst Story" was included in The Norton Anthology of Contemporary Fiction edited by R. V. Cassill and Joyce Carol Oates.

In 2001, Julia Alvarez published her first children's picture book, “The Secret Footprints”. This book was written by Alvarez, and illustrated by Fabian Negrin. The book was about the Ciguapas, which are part of a Dominican legend. The Ciguapas are a fictional people that have dark skin, black eyes, with long, shiny hair that flows down the length their bodies. They have backward feet, so that when they walk their footprints point backward. The main character is named Guapa, and she is described as being bold, and has a fascination with humans to the point that it threatens the secrecy of the Ciguapas. The book features themes such as community, curiosity, difference, gender roles, and folklore.

Alvarez has also published young adult fiction, notably Return to Sender (2009) about the friendship that forms between the middle school age son of a Vermont Dairy farmer, and the same-age daughter of the undocumented Mexican dairy worker hired by the boy's family. The children's lives offer many parallels, as both children lose a grandparent, and have one parent injured (Tyler's) or missing (Mari's), but other aspects of their lives are lived in sharp contrast according to their legal status. The book argues for a shared humanity that transcends borders and nationality, but does not shy from difficult issues like dangerous border crossing, criminal coyotes who exploit the vulnerable, and forced deportation. A similar young adult work that examines difficult political circumstances and children's experience of them is Before We Were Free (2003), told from the perspective of a young girl in the Dominican Republic in the months before and just after the assassination of dictator Rafael Trujillo. This novel addresses Dominican history in an accessible, riveting plot, describing aspects of the situation in 1961 little covered in most histories in English. Again, Alvarez uses the friendship between an American boy and Latina young girl as part of the story, but makes the relationship much less central in this earlier work.

In the Name of Salomé (2000) is a historical novel based on the lives of Salomé Ureña and of Camila Henríquez Ureña, both Dominican writers and respectively mother and daughter, to illustrate how they devoted their lives to political causes. The novel takes place in several locations, including the Dominican Republic before a backdrop of political turbulence, Communist Cuba in the 1960s, and several university campuses across the United States, containing themes of empowerment and activism. As the protagonists of this novel are both women, Alvarez illustrates how these women, "came together in their mutual love of [their homeland] and in their faith in the ability of women to forge a conscience for Out Americas." This book has been widely acclaimed for its careful historical research and captivating story, and was described by Publishers Weekly as "one of the most politically moving novels of the past half century."

In 2020, Alvarez published her first adult novel in 14 years, Afterlife. Alvarez was 70 years old when Afterlife was published; having made her name on poignant coming-of-age stories, Alvarez shifted her focus towards "the disorienting transition into old age." The main protagonist is grounded in both American and Dominican cultures, reflecting Alvarez's own background. Alvarez freely incorporates Spanish words and phrases into the story without the use of italics, quotations, or translations.

== Influence on Latino literature ==
Alvarez is regarded as one of the most critically and commercially successful Latina writers of her time. As Elizabeth Coonrod Martínez observes, Alvarez is part of a movement of Latina writers that also includes Sandra Cisneros and Cristina García, all of whom weave together themes of the experience of straddling the borders and cultures of Latin America and the United States. Coonrod Martínez suggests that a subsequent generation of Dominican-American writers, such as Angie Cruz, Loida Maritza Pérez, Nelly Rosario, and Junot Díaz, have been inspired by Alvarez's success. Alvarez has admitted that:

"..the bad part of being a 'Latina Writer' is that people want to make me into a spokesperson. There is no spokesperson! There are many realities, different shades and classes".

How the García Girls Lost Their Accents is the first novel by a Dominican-American woman to receive widespread acclaim and attention in the United States. The book portrays ethnic identity as problematic on several levels. Alvarez challenges commonly held assumptions of multiculturalism as strictly positive. She views much of immigrant identity as greatly affected by ethnic, gendered, and class conflict. According to critic Ellen McCracken:

"Transgression and incestuous overtones may not be the usual fare of the mainstream’s desirable multicultural commodity, but Alvarez’s deployment of such narrative tactics foregrounds the centrality of the struggle against abuse of patriarchal power in this Dominican American’s early contribution to the new Latina narrative of the 1990s."

Regarding the women's movement in writing, Alvarez explains:

"...definitely, still, there is a glass ceiling in terms of female novelists. If we have a female character, she might be engaging in something monumental but she’s also changing the diapers and doing the cooking, still doing things which get it called a woman’s novel. You know, a man’s novel is universal; a woman’s novel is for women."

Alvarez claims that her aim is not simply to write for women, but to also deal with universal themes that illustrate a more general interconnectedness. She explains:

"What I try to do with my writing is to move out into those other selves, other worlds. To become more and more of us."

As an illustration of this point, Alvarez writes in English about issues in the Dominican Republic, using a combination of both English and Spanish. Alvarez feels empowered by the notion of populations and cultures around the world mixing, and because of this, identifies as a "Citizen of the World".

== Grants and honors ==
Alvarez has received grants from the National Endowment for the Arts and the Ingram Merrill Foundation. Some of her poetry manuscripts now have a permanent home in the New York Public Library, where her work was featured in an exhibit, "The Hand of the Poet: Original Manuscripts by 100 Masters, From John Donne to Julia Alvarez." She received the Lamont Prize from the Academy of American Poets in 1974, first prize in narrative from the Third Woman Press Award in 1986, and an award from the General Electric Foundation in 1986. In 2009, she received the Fitzgerald Award for Achievement in American Literature.

How the García Girls Lost Their Accents was the winner of the 1991 PEN Oakland/Josephine Miles Literary Award for works that present a multicultural viewpoint. Yo! was selected as a notable book by the American Library Association in 1998. Before We Were Free won the Belpre Medal in 2004, and Return to Sender won the Belpre Medal in 2010. She also received the 2002 Hispanic Heritage Award in Literature.

== Works ==
=== Fiction ===
- How the García Girls Lost Their Accents. Chapel Hill, NC: Algonquin Books, 1991. ISBN 978-0-945575-57-3
- In the Time of the Butterflies. Chapel Hill, NC: Algonquin Books, 1994. ISBN 978-1-56512-038-9
- Yo!. Chapel Hill, NC: Algonquin Books, 1997. ISBN 978-0-452-27918-6
- In the Name of Salomé. Chapel Hill, NC: Algonquin Books, 2000. ISBN 978-1-56512-276-5
- Saving the World: A Novel. Chapel Hill, NC: Algonquin Books, 2006. ISBN 978-1-56512-510-0
- Afterlife: A Novel. Chapel Hill, NC: Algonquin Books, 2020. ISBN 978-1-64375-025-5
- The Cemetery of Untold Stories. Chapel Hill, NC: Algonquin Books, 2024. ISBN 978-1-64375-384-3

==== Children’s and young adult ====
- The Secret Footprints. New York: Knopf, 2000.
- A Cafecito Story. White River Junction, VT: Chelsea Green, 2001. ISBN 978-1-931498-00-5
- How Tia Lola Came to ~~visit~~ Stay. New York: Knopf, 2001. ISBN 978-0-375-90215-4
- Before We Were Free. New York: A. Knopf. 2002. ISBN 978-0-375-81544-7.
- Finding Miracles. New York: Knopf, 2004. ISBN 978-0-375-92760-7
- A Gift of Gracias: The Legend of Altagracia. New York: Knopf. 2005. ISBN 978-0-375-82425-8.
- El mejor regalo del mundo: la leyenda de la Vieja Belen / The Best Gift of All: The Legend of La Vieja Belen. Miami: Alfaguara, 2009. (bilingual book)
- Return to Sender. New York: Alfred A. Knopf. 2009. ISBN 978-0-375-85838-3.
- How Tia Lola Learned to Teach. New York: Knopf. 2010. ISBN 978-0-375-86460-5.
- How Tía Lola Saved the Summer. New York: Knopf. 2011. ISBN 978-0-375-86727-9.
- Where Do They Go?. New York: Seven Stories Press, 2016. ISBN 978-1-609-80670-5

=== Poetry ===
- The Other Side (El Cocko), Dutton, 1995, ISBN 978-0-525-93922-1
- Homecoming: New and Selected Poems, Plume, 1996, ISBN 978-0-452-27567-6 – reissue of 1984 volume, with new poems
- The Woman I Kept to Myself, Algonquin Books of Chapel Hill, 2004; 2011, ISBN 978-1-61620-072-5
- Visitations, Alfred E. Knopf, 2026, ISBN 978-0-5938-050-39

=== Nonfiction ===
- Something to Declare, Algonquin Books of Chapel Hill, 1998, ISBN 978-1-56512-193-5 (collected essays)
- Once Upon a Quinceañera: Coming of Age in the USA. Penguin. 2007. ISBN 978-0-670-03873-2.
- A Wedding in Haiti: The Story of a Friendship. 2012.

== See also ==
- Caribbean literature
- Latin American literature
- Latino literature
