= How the García Girls Lost Their Accents =

1991 novel written by Dominican-American poet

- First edition
- Author: Julia Alvarez
- Language: English
- Genre: Bildungsroman
- Publisher: Algonquin Books
- Publication date: 1991
- Publication place: United States
- Media type: Print (hardcover)
- Pages: 286 pp
- ISBN: 0-452-26806-0
- OCLC: 25025163
- Dewey Decimal: 813.54

How the García Girls Lost Their Accents is a 1991 novel written by Dominican-American poet, novelist, and essayist Julia Alvarez. Told in reverse chronological order and narrated from shifting perspectives, the story spans more than thirty years in the lives of four sisters, beginning with their adult lives in the United States and ending with their childhood in the Dominican Republic, a country from which their family was forced to flee due to the father's opposition to Rafael Leónidas Trujillo's dictatorship.

The novel's major themes include acculturation and coming of age. It deals with the myriad hardships of immigration, painting a vivid picture of the struggle to assimilate, the sense of displacement, and the confusion of identity suffered by the García family, as they are uprooted from familiarity and forced to begin a new life in New York City. The text consists of fifteen interconnected short stories, each of which focuses on one of the four daughters, and in a few instances, the García family as a whole. Although it is told from alternating perspectives there is particular focus throughout the text on the character of Yolanda, who is said to be both the protagonist and the author's alter ego.

== Background and historical context ==
The years between 1956 and 1970 were a period of oppression and instability in the Dominican Republic as the dictatorship of Rafael Trujillo came to an end with his assassination in 1961, only to be followed by military rule, revolution, intervention by the United States, and further dictatorship. Central control over the military, the economy, and the people meant that only a select few were allowed to leave the island. Critic William Luis describes the situation of immigrants from the Dominican Republic to the United States during the revolution: "The displacement of Caribbean people from their islands to the United States, for political or economical reasons, has produced a tension between the culture of the country of origin and that of the adopted homeland, one representing the past and the other future of the immigrant".

The García family is an example of this phenomenon. In How the García Girls Lost Their Accents, Alvarez succeeds in altering the events of her own life to create fiction. The family is displaced to the United States after living an established, upper-class life in the Dominican Republic, and is forced to face the challenges which come along with being an immigrant family in a foreign land. Julia Alvarez herself was not born in the Dominican Republic, but in the United States. After her parents' failed attempt at a life in America, she returned to the Dominican Republic at the age of three months as her parents preferred the dictatorship of Trujillo to the US. Clearly in the novel, this is not the case, however throughout, the reader witnesses the Garcia family assimilate into American society. Although their Hispanic roots are reflected in their personalities, it is evident that the stories which focus on the four daughters depict many problems that normal North American girls do.

Even though How the García Girls Lost Their Accents was written in the United States, there are significant historical ties between the novel and the author's country of origin. Alvarez wrote an essay entitled "An American Childhood in the Dominican Republic", in which she reveals some information about her own life. This is evidence that it may have served as the basis for the novel. For example, she mentions that it was Mr. Victor, of the US embassy and a member of the Central Intelligence Agency (CIA), who persuaded Carlos García to join the resistance against Trujillo, and later helped him in leaving the country, and obtaining a job with an international cardiovascular team. This is a parallel to the novel in which Carlos Garcia obtains work as a doctor in New York. Julia Alvarez emigrated to the United States at the age of 10 with her parents and three sisters as political refugees from the Dominican Republic. The novel is a variation of her real-life experiences, which have perhaps been slightly altered. The majority of her literature is constructed from multiple viewpoints and a strongly concealed political undercurrent is present in her literature. In this case, that undercurrent is her family fleeing the Trujillo revolution, something she did as a child. The novel encompasses the impact living under a regime can have on a family, and the way it shaped the four girls' upbringing. It is also an attempt to understand memory, the past, and a time before the sisters lost their innocence and accents.

== Plot summary ==
The novel is written episodically and in reverse-chronological order. It consists of fifteen chapters in three parts: Part I (1989–1972), Part II (1970–1960), and Part III (1960–1956). Part I is centered on the adult lives of the García sisters; Part II describes their immigration to the United States and their adolescence, and Part III recollects their early childhood on the island, in the Dominican Republic.

The Garcías are one of the Dominican Republic's prominent and wealthy families, tracing their roots back to the Conquistadores. Carlos García, a physician and the head of the family, is the youngest of 35 children his father sired during his lifetime, both in and out of wedlock. Laura, Carlos's wife, also comes from an important family: her father is a factory owner and a diplomat with the United Nations. Many members of the extended family live as neighbours in large houses on an expansive compound with numerous servants. In the early 1950s the García girls are born. Carla, Sandra, Yolanda and Sofía enjoy a happy, protected childhood and are brought up by their parents, aunts and uncles to preserve the family traditions. Their countless cousins serve them as playmates.

=== Part I ===
The first part of the novel establishes Yolanda at the centre of the story as she narrates the opening and closing chapter: "Antojos" and "The Rudy Elmenhurst Story", respectively. In third person, Yolanda's return to Dominican Republic as an adult is described in the context of a family birthday party and a road trip. Their unity as sisters as "The Four Girls" is introduced in the third chapter, which is communally narrated. They celebrate Carlos, the patriarch's, birthday, and Sofía introduces her baby son to his grandfather, helping to repair the father and daughter's relationship somewhat. During Sofía's chapter, "The Kiss", it is revealed that Carlos discovered a packet of love letters addressed to his daughter, enraging him and leading to a conflict which ends in Sofía running away to her German lover. A major focus in this section is the romantic relationships between the four sisters and their partners. Sofía is married to a "world-class chemist"; Carla and Sandra are in long-term relationships; and Yolanda is in love with her psychiatrist and has previously broken up with a man named John. Part I closes with "The Rudy Elmenhurst Story", narrated by Yolanda. This describes Yolanda's first real relationship, and the tension between her upbringing and American relationships: "I would never find someone who would understand my particular mix of Catholicism and agnosticism, Hispanic and American styles."

=== Part II ===
Part II details the family's collective experience of living in the United States as immigrants. The girls first attend a Catholic school in New York and later boarding school, and assimilate fairly well to their new environments, although meeting with a few set-backs along the way. Their time in the US begins with the opening chapter, "A Regular Revolution", and delivers the girls' (collective) opinion that "We didn't feel we had the best the United States had to offer. We had only second-hand stuff, rental houses in one redneck Catholic neighborhood after another". While during their first few months in New York they regularly pray to God that they will soon be able to return to their homeland, they quickly start appreciating the advantages of living in a "free country" so that even being sent back to the Dominican Republic for the summer becomes a form of punishment for them.

A major turning point in the novel comes with Laura's discovery of a bag of Sofía's marijuana, and her subsequent punishment of being removed from her boarding school and forced to spend a year in the Dominican Republic with family. This event is representative of the girls' transformation into Americans and away from the Dominican culture and Laura and Carlos' conflicted relationship with the assimilation. Laura "still did lip service to the old ways", and Carlos makes a point of educating the accents out of the girls, thus showing the tension between the cultures.

Carla becomes the victim of racism in the third chapter, "Trespass", with school boys telling her to "Go back to where you came from, you dirty spic!" Later she is subjected to a child molester who masturbates in his car while pulling up at the curb and talking lecherously to her through the open window. The second part of the novel finishes with the chapter "Floor Show", in which the García family goes to a Spanish restaurant and Sandra witnesses the host's wife amorously attempting to kiss her father on the way to the bathroom. Overall, Part II presents the unexpected aspects of living in the United States and becoming Americans, and explores the tensions that develop with the immigrant experience.

=== Part III ===
The Dominican Republic, in relation to the rest of the Caribbean

The five chapters in Part III, the concluding section, focus on the García family's early years in the Dominican Republic, and are the most political of the novel.

The first chapter, "The Blood of the Conquistadores", opens with an account of two of Trujillo's agents coming to the family home looking for Carlos. His revolutionary politics and work against the Chapitas made the family a target, and this chapter explicitly details the danger of their situation. The issues in past chapters appear superficial in comparison to the life-or-death nature of the conflicts that the Garcías face earlier in their lives. The family escapes persecution, but is forced to emigrate immediately, establishing their motive for relocating to New York.

The second chapter, "The Human Body", describes what happens to Mundin, Yolanda and Sofia in the dirty shed near the house. Yolanda plays with her boy cousin, Mundin, and in exchange for a Human Body doll and a modeling clay, shows him her genitals. Sofia also follows suit. ' "Go on," Mundin ordered impatiently. Fifi had caught on and lowered her pants and panties to her ankles. I gave my sister a defiant look as I lifted up my cowboy skirt, tucked it under my chin, and yanked my panties down (Alvarez, 235).'

As Part III progresses, the narrative switches to describing their upper-class life on the island, and filling details of the lifestyle the family was born into. The story of the voodoo practicing Haitian family maid is elucidated: she escaped Trujillo's massacre of Haitians and came to work for Laura, although much of her family was not so lucky.

In the last three chapters Carla, Yolanda and Sandra narrate stories from their childhood surrounded by the extended family, and the girls' relationship with the United States begins. "An American Surprise" tells of their early ideas of New York City, "where it was winter and the snow fell from heaven to earth like the Bible's little pieces of manna bread." The reader realizes that the innocence of childhood and idealized vision of their soon-to-be adopted country, given the reverse-chronological narration of How the García Girls Lost Their Accents, are left behind with the García's home in the Dominican Republic.

== Characters ==
=== Sofia ===
Sofia, "Fifi", is the youngest of the four girls, and is the maverick out of her sisters. She gains the attention of the reader multiple times throughout the book, as her stories are different in nature from those of the other García girls. In the book Alvarez quotes "Sofia was the one without the degrees. She had always gone her own way". Out of her sisters, she was the plain one but had consistent boyfriends and was always being asked advice about men from the other three girls. In the first chapter, "The Kiss", readers are told the story of her rebellious marriage to a "jolly and good natured" German man in Colombia during a rebellious vacation with her current boyfriend. After her marriage to him, her relationship with her father deteriorates significantly until her son is born. The family reunites to celebrate her father's birthday and son's christening, although Sofia still feels the same antagonism she felt towards him beforehand.

=== Sandra ===
Sandra is the second daughter in the novel, the pretty one who could "pass as an American, with soft blue eyes and fair skin". We see the loving and caring part of her personality emerge in "Floor Show" where at a very young age she decides that if her family got into a really bad financial situation, she would attempt to get adopted by a rich family, get an allowance "like other American girls got" which she would then pass onto her family. The spot-light falls on her again when she goes away to a graduate program and her parents receive a letter from the dean saying Sandra has been hospitalized after an extreme diet, revealing that she is anorexic. She dreams of being an artist. She broke her arm.

=== Yolanda ===
Yolanda is the third oldest and most imaginative of the four girls. She plays the most important role in the novel as Alvarez's alter ego. She is a schoolteacher, a poet and a writer. Her nicknames, which reflect and represent the different aspects of her personality, consist of "Joe", "Yosita", "Yoyo" and simply "Yo", which is also the title of the sequel to How the García Girls Lost Their Accents. Each of these nicknames are the product of one of Yolanda's multiple personalities. There is important significance in her character as "Yo", Spanish first person pronoun, the "I" of the narrator. The nickname "Yoyo" is reminiscent of the toy that goes up and down, back and forth, similar to Yolanda's bouncing from culture to culture, from one extreme to another. The last, "Joe" represents the American version of Yolanda. Her ultimate return to the Island "represents her desire to displace herself from the North American Joe to the Yolanda of her family and youth." These nicknames "act to properly define and name the many diverse facets of her complex personality". Her character is that whose voice and words are most frequently heard throughout the novel; she is the most developed character and her identity is the most explored of the four girls. She is best friends with her cousin Mundin.

=== Carla ===
Carla is the eldest of the four daughters. As is common for the oldest sibling, she is somewhat seen as the mediator between the four sisters in the novel. "As the therapist in the family, Carla likes to be the one who understands everything" and "has a tendency to lace all her compliments with calls to self-improvement". However to her sisters, this creates a somewhat dominating character at times reminiscent of their mother. Her criticism goes farther when she writes an autobiographical paper calling her mother mildly anal-retentive. In Carla's first and perhaps most prominent story in the novel, "Trespass", as she is walking home from school in New York, a man exposes himself to her and attempts to lure her into his car. Alvarez uses Carla's character to display the language difficulties faced with only having "classroom English", and how communication barriers affect immigrants.

== Style and structure ==
Alvarez defies the Aristotelian notion of a well-knit plot, as the story is told in reverse chronological order through a series of fifteen chapters, with no linear, unifying storyline. In Julia Alvarez: A critical companion, Scholar Silvio Sirias argues that "a well-constructed plot has an underlying structure that promises the reader that the author is in control, and that any event she is telling will eventually make sense". Sirias then goes on to explain how Alvarez's initial exposure of the girls to the reader in their somewhat adjusted, adult states enables her to first evoke certain assumptions in the reader and subsequently shatter these assumptions with the disclosure of the García family's troubled past. Scholar Julie Barak argues that the reverse chronological order Alvarez employs is actually a unique stylistic technique which adds "to the reader's uncertainty and instability, [allowing for the recreation] of the Garcia girls' own ambiguities".

Scholar William Luis observes a strong resemblance between the structure of Julia Alvarez's How the García Girls Lost Their Accents and Alejo Carpentier's Viaje a la Semilla as both employ the tactic of backwards narration and consequently lay claim to two beginnings and two endings. Alvarez has also been said to follow the stylistic traditions established by novels such as Pedro Juan Labarthe's The Son of Two Nations: The Private Life of a Columbia Student (1931), Marcio Veloz Maggiolo's El prófugo (1962), Humberto Cintrón's Frankie Cristo (1972), and Richard Ruiz's The Hungry American (1978). Despite the overtly North American stylistic qualities the book appears to boast at first glance, each of the aforementioned authors are of Hispanic descent.

Julie Barak emphasizes the significance of "one other stylistic idiosyncrasy of the work that adds to the sophistication of [Alvarez's] artistry" as there is a marked transition from third to first person narration for each girl in the last section of the novel. Luis describes this shift as a pivotal moment after which the events assume a chronological order and time accelerates, illuminating life in such a manner that it suddenly makes sense. The manner in which Alvarez alters the narrative voice is a stylistic expression of the extent to which each one of the girls "wants to be in control of her own version of her history... These first person narratives in the last section become, in effect, a defense offered by each girl in her own words, an explanation of who they have become in the present, of why they 'turned out' the way they have." The transition of narrative voice "changes the dynamic of the reader-character-author triad" and allows for the reader, who has been kept at a distance by the third person narrator, to relive "the memory with the character, closely connected to her, developing a strong empathy with a unified character".

Jacqueline Stefanko rationalizes Alvarez's decision to alternate amongst the varying voices of all four García girls, wither her assertion that "the amnesia produced by the diasporic cultures of Latinas gets negotiated within the text through polyphony". After significant observation, Stefanko has concluded that "as hybrid selves who cross and recross borders of language and culture, these Latina writers create hybrid texts in order to 'survive in diaspora,' to use Donna Haraway's term, seeking to heal the fractures and ruptures resulting from exile and dispersal". Through her creation of How the García Girls Lost Their Accents Alvarez has intentionally fictionalized her own life story in a polyphonous manner which extends beyond the boundaries of traditional style and genre, thus setting herself apart from the average author both stylistically and structurally.

== Major themes ==
=== Fragmentation of self ===
Perhaps one of the most prominent themes in How the García Girls Lost Their Accents is that of the fragmented concept of the self. The fragmentation of one's personal identity is a serious issue suffered by all four García girls throughout the course of the novel. Their immigration has left them as multiple beings, torn between their Dominican and American identities. As a college student, Yolanda encounters a boy named Rudy Elmenhurst, who is relentless in his attempts to pressure her into bed with him. When he can bear frustration no longer, Rudy lashes out and ends their relationship, leaving Yolanda devastated and hoping for his return. The inner turmoil evoked in Yolanda by this traumatic episode is evident through her realization of "what a cold lonely life awaited [her] in this country. [Yolanda] would never find someone who would understand [her] peculiar mix of Catholicism and agnosticism, Hispanic and American styles". Julie Barak, of Mesa State College, has described this passage as a poignant and elegant reprisal of the recurrent sense of being divided selves and speaking divided languages found throughout the majority of the text.

The Flamenco dance in the "Floor Show" chapter evokes similar feelings of desolation in Sandra, as Mrs. Fanning's drunken interruption of the distinctly Hispanic dance performance makes "a parody of it, a second-rate combination of cultures that Sandi cannot find fulfilling. She is searching for a unified self, something noble, true, beautiful. Just as she gets close to it, however, it is ruined, dissolving into a gauche pastiche too similar to her own divided life in the States".

Latin American literature scholar, Jacqueline Stefanko, along with several of her peers, has made pointed mention of the significant implications Yolanda's multiple nicknames hold for her fragile and fragmented sense of self. Stefanko observes that "as Yolanda's names proliferate on the page, we begin to see the multiplicity of her identity [and] realize the struggle Yolanda must engage in to not be fragmented in a society that marginalizes her". Scholar William Luis reinforces the notion that Yolanda's shattered identity stems largely from the "multiple names used [to refer to her]. She is Yolanda, Yoyo, Yosita, Yo and, last but not least the English Joe. And above all, she is 'Yo,' the Spanish first person pronoun, the 'I' of the narrator."

Julie Barak finds the wording of Yolanda's note to her husband, John, explaining why she must leave him, quite significant with reference to her divided self-concept. Yolanda began "I'm going home to my folks till my head-slash-heart clears. She revised the note. I'm needing some space, some time, until my head-slash-heart-slash-soul- No, no, no she didn't want to divide herself any-more, three persons in one Yo."

=== Quest for clarification of identity ===
The search for a clear and distinct personal identity is thematically quite closely related to that of the fragmented self. The quest undertaken by the García sisters for the clarification of their confused identities, however, is an attempt to achieve a solution to the problem posed by the fragmented self, and thus warrants separate categorization. Scholar William Luis reminds readers of Alvarez that "Yolanda's search for her Dominican identity must be understood within the context of the 1960s in the United States". As they begin to grow, the girls resent their parents who appear oblivious to their need to "fit in America among Americans; they needed help figuring out who they were, why the Irish kids whose grandparents had been micks were calling them spics".

Luis uses the term "onomastic displacement" with reference to the multiple nicknames that fragment Yolanda's concept of a whole and unified self. This continuous onomastic displacement incites in Yolanda the desire to question her divided identity, to seek unity, clarity and a coherent understanding of her circumstances. Yolanda achieves this clarity through the act of writing and even as a young girl she revels in the completion of her speech for the Teacher's Day address because "she finally sound[s] like herself in English!" Unlike her sister Sandi, "whose artistic predilections were crushed as a child, Yolanda faces and works through her identity problems in her writing". Barak views Yolanda's writing as a process that can be used to reunite the fragments of her identity; as an aid in the acceptance of "her own 'hybrid' nature... bringing both her worlds and all her selves into balance". It is thus only through writing, the expression of Yolanda's most intricately personal thoughts and revelations, that the protagonist can retain the hope of restoring her unified personal identity.

=== Assimilation ===
Assimilation is a particularly difficult process for Hispanic Americans because they have "old countries that are neither old nor remote. Even those born in North America travel to their parents' homeland, and constantly face a flow of friends and relatives from 'home' who keep the culture current. This constant cross-fertilization makes assimilation a more complicated process for them than for other minority groups". Julie Barak confirms Gonzalez Echevarria's assertions regarding Latin American immigration and continues on to demonstrate how the privileged, wealthy existence led by the García girls in the Dominican Republic serves to further complicate their process of assimilation. The girls are vastly unaware of their good fortune until they are faced with the economic hardships of immigration in the United States.

How the García Girls Lost Their Accents confirms the suspicion widely expressed in circles of Latin American literature that North Americans choose not to differentiate between political and economic exile. Alvarez pointedly demonstrates the North American tendency to undervalue cultural diversity by highlighting instances of American ignorance toward distinctions between different Hispanic-Caribbean groups. The García girls are quite conflicted upon their arrival in the United States as they find that distinct cultural groups are lumped together under one broad "immigrant" category and newcomers are encouraged to assimilate silently to the American norm. Yolanda's conflict with her father regarding the potentially controversial speech she has prepared for the Teacher's Day Address provides a classic example of the manner in which the García girls are pressured to conform to the norm. Yolanda feels as though she has sacrificed her principles and sold out to the hyper-sensitive authorities when her father forces her to discard her empowering, rebellious achievement of artistic self-expression for "two brief pages of stale compliments and the polite commonplaces on teachers. A speech wrought by necessity and without much invention". Julie Barak affirms that "although this incident is in many ways a defeat for both Yolanda and her mother, it does teach them the lesson of conformity that is so important to living peacefully in America. Yolanda learns to fit in, to do the expected". The girls go on to attend the best schools, lose their Spanish accents and acquire the same psychological disorders as their upper-class American counterparts. Sandra battles anorexia, Carla and Yolanda both have failed marriages, Yolanda and Sandra are both institutionalized for psychiatric issues at one time or another, and Sofía is impregnated out of wedlock.

=== Fear ===
How the García Girls Lost Their Accents is rife with the constant presence of fear which manifests itself in a seemingly endless variety of outlets. Alvarez depicts quite vividly the fear evoked in the girls' mother, Laura, near the chronological beginning of the book, as she "sees the black V.W. [the trademark of Dominican dictator Trujillo’s henchmen], and her heart plummets right down to her toes". Even after the García family has spent several years in the United States, safe from the threat of Trujillo's retribution, a relentless paranoia continues to plague Carlos, their father, "who still lives in fear of the SIM and who is afraid to speak of 'revolt' out loud". This initial fear of Carlos' punishment for his role in the attempted assassination of Trujillo is what originally prompted the García family's flight from the island and spawned the myriad other fears that would later plague their lives. The conflicted life the daughters would come to lead in the sexually liberated United States would be haunted by the fear of pregnancy and eternal damnation should they allow themselves to be seduced.

The Cuban Missile Crisis also becomes a significant source of fear for the girls. In a very brief chapter entitled "Snow", Alvarez reveals the impact of this widespread cultural paranoia through the character of Yolanda, who mistakes her first experience of snowfall for "the beginning of a much anticipated nuclear attack", causing a panicked outbreak of general hysteria in her classroom.

As they continue to grow and mature, the girls have many disappointing encounters which leave them fearful of the loneliness that must await them in this foreign country where they struggle hopelessly to fit in and be understood. Even as a grown woman, returning to her Dominican roots, Yolanda finds she can never truly escape the fear that has hovered over her for as long as she can remember. This is evident in the very first chapter, "Antojos", as Alvarez reveals the panic evoked in the adult Yolanda at the sudden realization that she is stranded in a guava field in the Dominican Republic, where women do not go about unchaperoned at night. Alvarez evokes Yolanda's fear as she reports that "the rustling leaves of the guava trees echo the warnings of her old aunts: you will get lost, you will get kidnapped, you will get raped, you will get killed".

As scholar Julie Barak has put it, "the vocabulary of fear that accompanies them is not only a part of their Spanish, but also of their English vocabulary" and the García family can therefore never hold legitimate hopes of escaping the fear.

=== Memory ===
William Luis argues that How the García Girls Lost Their Accents "is an attempt to understand memory, the past and a time before the sisters lost their innocence and accents". Memory plays a significant role in the text, as a means by which the girls can return to the past of their childhood in the attempt to make sense of their present-day realities. The youngest child, Sofía carries with her only a single memory of her brief childhood on the island, in which the García's Haitian maid, Chucha, says a voodoo goodbye to the girls before they leave for the United States. Sofía feels segregated and deprived "because she has only this one memory to help her reconstruct her bicultural, bilingual self. Though this lack of memory makes her the least divided of her sisters in many ways... the most disturbed, the most rebellious against her circumstances." Ironically enough, Chucha's voodoo prediction itself is largely concerned with the concept of memory, as she insists that after leaving the island the girls "will be haunted by what they do and don't remember. But they have spirit in them. They will invent what they need to survive". Julie Barak confirms this notion of memory as both a positive and negative force in the García girls’ constant struggle to unearth their true identities.

== Literary significance and reception ==
When How the García Girls Lost Their Accents was published in 1991, the book "made a resounding splash on the literary scene" according to Jonathan Bing in the 1996 Publishers Weekly review of the novel. Although it was her first novel, Alvarez gained significant attention for the book, including a part in the New York Public Library's 1991 exhibit "The Hand of the Poet from John Donne to Julia Alvarez". The Women's Review of Books also lauds the author, stating that "With this first novel, Julia Alvarez joins the rank of other Latina writers such as Nicholasa Mohr and Helena María Viramontes".

The novel was generally critically acclaimed, with Cecilia Rodríguez Milanés of The Women's Review of Books writing that "How the García Girls Lost Their Accents is a noteworthy book, demanding our attention." The Publishers Weekly article notes that "the novel provided a keen look at the island social structure they [the García family] wistfully remember and the political turmoil they escaped".

Since 1991, the book has become widely read and referenced; a well-known part of the canon of Latino literature. Julia Alvarez was awarded the status of Doctor Honoris Causa, Humanidades, by Pontificia Universidad Católica Madre y Maestra, Santiago, Dominican Republic on January 24, 2006 for How the García Girls Lost Their Accents.

In 1999, Library Journal reported that a "select cadre of librarians representing New York City's three public library systems have released their hand-picked list of '21 new classics for the 21st century'" and the novel was included on the list.

A number of scholarly articles and papers have been written on Alvarez's book since its publication, including "A Search for Identity in Julia Alvarez's How the García Girls Lost Their Accents" by William Luis and Joan Hoffman's "She Wants to be Called Yolanda Now: Identity, Language, and the Third Sister in How the García Girls Lost Their Accents", which was featured in the Bilingual Review.
