= Paola Corso =

American poet

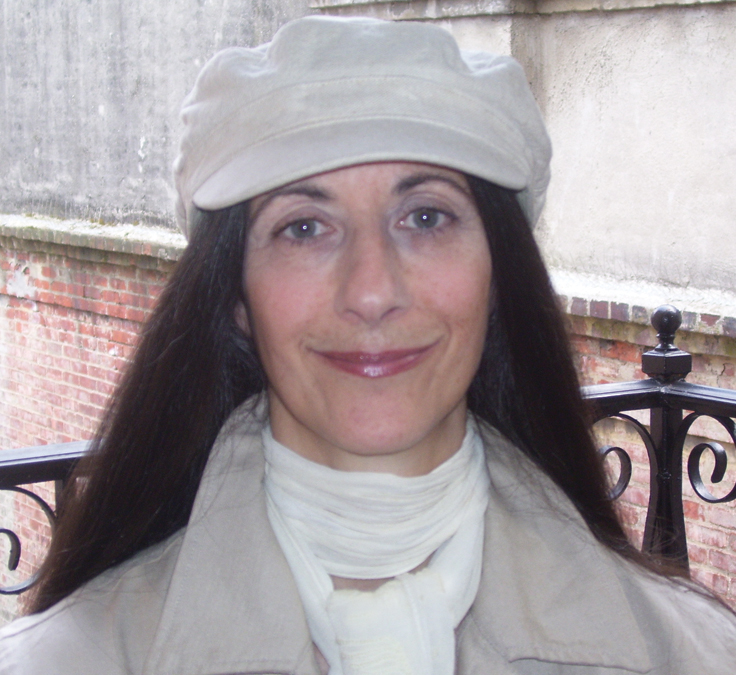
- Paola Jo (PJ) Corso
- Born: Pittsburgh, Pennsylvania, U.S.
- Education: Boston College (BA); San Francisco State University (MPA); City College of New York (MA)
- Occupations: Poet; fiction writer; essayist
- Notable work: The Laundress Catches Her Breath, Catina's Haircut
- Awards: New York Foundation for the Arts Poetry Fellow

Paola Jo (PJ) Corso (May 28, Pittsburgh, Pennsylvania) is an American fiction writer, poet, photographer and literary activist. Corso is a New York Foundation for the Arts Poetry Fellow, Sherwood Anderson Fiction Award Winner,, and included on the Pennsylvania Center for the Book's Literary Map. She is the author of eight books of fiction and poetry, including 'Vertical Bridges: Poems and Photographs of City Steps,' (2020) with original photos by the author and archival photographs from the University of Pittsburgh Library; Catina's Haircut: A Novel in Stories (2010) on Library Journal’s notable list of first novels; Giovanna's 86 Circles And Other Stories (2005), a Binghamton University's John Gardner Fiction Book Award Finalist; a book of poems, Death by Renaissance (2004), and award-winning poetry collections, The Laundress Catches Her Breath, winner of the Tillie Olsen Award for Creative Writing; and Once I Was Told the Air Was Not for Breathing (2012), about Pittsburgh steelworkers and garment workers in the Triangle Shirtwaist Factory fire and winner of a Triangle Fire Memorial Association Award.

Her books are set in the Pittsburgh area, where her Southern Italian immigrant family members worked in the steel mills. Her themes include ethnicity, the working class, social change, and magical leaps. Corso has also written poetry books about growing up near a toxic dump that was on the EPA's Superfund List, the city's history of water and air pollution, and the link between cancer and a polluted environment in the workplace. She co-edited an anthology, Politics of Water: A Confluence of Women's Voices and wrote an introductory personal essay on the subject of industrial pollution.

Corso is co-founder and resident artist of Steppin Stanzas and a member of the Park Slope Windsor Terrace Artists Collective. Formerly a writer-in-residence in Western Connecticut State University’s MFA Program in Creative and Professional Writing, Corso has also been a lecturer in Chatham University's MFA Program in Creative Writing. She splits her time between Pittsburgh and New York City, where she is on the faculty of the Languages and Literature Department at Touro College.

== Life, career, and community organizing ==
Corso was born in the Alle-Kiski Valley of Allegheny County, in the Pittsburgh area and lived as a young adult in the city's East End neighborhood, Squirrel Hill. She graduated from Boston College with her BA in Sociology. She continued her education at San Francisco State University, where she obtained an MPA in Public Administration/Community Organizing. In 1999, Corso received her MA in Creative Writing/English from City College of New York/ CUNY.

Prior to her teaching career, Corso was a community organizer and grant writer for non-profits. She created collaborative community arts projects. She partnered with Northside Common Ministries, a Pittsburgh ecumenical organization, and its members to co-write plays with Michael Winks about homelessness and hunger, based on interviews they conducted in shelters and food pantries. House of Cards was produced at Pittsburgh Public Theater and Leftovers was awarded a state grant from Pennsylvania Council on the Arts.

Corso was also a resident writer for the National Endowment for the Arts WritersCorps in the Bronx where she introduced literary arts in hospitals and senior centers. She co-founded the National Writers Union New York Local's Community Writing Project and led writing workshops in a Manhattan shelter for single mothers. Her community service earned her a place on the Mid Atlantic Arts Foundation Artist & Communities Short List. She co-curated the reading series, WORDsprouts at the Park Slope Food Coop in Brooklyn and founded Writers in the Wall, a creative writing workshop and reading series in the Pittsburgh river town of Aspinwall.

Most recently, she is cofounder and resident artist of Steppin Stanzas, which produced "On the Way Up: City Steps, City Immigrants," a short video paying tribute to early immigrants who built Pittsburgh public stairways, those who care for them, and new immigrants to the city. Other Steppin Stanzas community activities include a Step Quote Contest at Pittsburgh StepTrek to gather winning quotes. She is a member of the Park Slope Windsor Terrace Artists Collective.

She is the daughter of Vincenza Marie Calderone and Mario Procopio Corso. Corso is married to Michael Winks; the couple has two sons.

== Works ==
=== Books ===
- Corso, Paola (2020). Vertical Bridges: Poems and Photographs of City Steps. Six Gallery Press. ISBN 978-1-989305-05-8.
- Corso, Paola (2012). Once I Was Told the Air Was Not For Breathing. University of Wisconsin's Parallel Press. ISBN 978-1-934795-37-8.
- Corso, Paola (2012). The Laundress Catches Her Breath. CavanKerry Press. ISBN 978-1-933880-31-0.
- Corso, Paola (2010). Catina's Haircut: A Novel in Stories. University of Wisconsin Press. ISBN 978-0-299-24840-6.
- Corso, Paola (2007) [2005]. Giovanna's 86 Circles and Other Stories. University of Wisconsin Press. ISBN 978-0-299-21280-3.
- Corso, Paola (2004). Death by Renaissance. Bottom Dog Press. ISBN 0933087861.
- Corso, Paola (2003). A Proper Burial. Pudding House. ISBN 1-58998-145-6.

=== Editing ===
- Corso, Paola; Ghosh, Nandita (eds.). Politics of Water : A Confluence of Women's Voices. Routledge Press/ International Feminist Journal of Politics. 2007.

=== Poems ===
- "Dye House" and "Fannie's Hat," Women's Review of Books, January 2010.
- "The Laundress Catches Her Breath in Ten Seconds," Sentence: A Journal of Prose Poetics, Spring 2009.
- "Oxygen for Two," Beloit Poetry Journal, Winter 2008.
- "Step by Step with the Laundress," Subtropics (journal), Winter 2006.
- "Eyewitness" and "Identified," Feminist Studies Journal, Winter 2006.
- "Once I Was Told the Air Was Not for Breathing," The Progressive, 2004.
- "Four Hundred Tons or Twenty Five Thousand Dollars a Day," Women's Studies Quarterly, Spring 2004.

=== Stories ===
- "Unraveled," Wild Dreams: Best of Italian Americana, (Fordham University Press, Fall 2008).
- "Mirage," Best Travel Writing of 2006, (Traveler's Tales, 2006).
- "A Flower on the Riverbank Will Not Bloom, Will Not Die," Epiphany, Winter 2004.
- "The River Inside Her," Sudden Stories, (Mammoth Books, April 2003).
- "Jesus Behind Bars," U.S. Catholic, April 2000.

=== Non-fiction ===
- "What really happened: Despite her fictional license, a writer wrestles with the truth of how her great-grandparents were really killed," The Writer, April 2011.
- "From Without and From Within," Glimmer Train Press, Portland, OR, October 2010.
- "Coke, Clairton, and Cancer: A Three Decade Push for Reforms," Western Pennsylvania History, Winter 2007/2008.
- "On Writing Against Ethnic Stereotypes," The Writer, November 2008.
- "Piece by Piece: By putting it together carefully, you can create a short-story collection that adds up to more than the sum of its parts," Writer's Digest, June 2006.
- "Falling into Place: Arrange your poetry with a purpose to shape your collection into a cohesive, lyrical manuscript," Writer's Digest, April 2006.
- "Metered meditation: A writer takes poetic license with her prayer life," U.S. Catholic Magazine, April 2005.
- "From Pittsburgh to New York (But Never Really Leaving)," Western Pennsylvania History, Spring 2004.

=== Anthologies ===
- "Emissions Test" in Vando, Gloria; Miller, Phillip (eds.). In the Black; In the Red: Poems of Profit $ Loss. Helicon Nine Editions, (2012).
- "The Doctor Makes His Diagnosis" in Dennis Barone (ed.). New Hungers for Old: One-Hundred Years of Italian-American Poetry. Star Cloud Press, (2011).
- "Once I Was Told the Air Was Not for Breathing" in Adler, Frances Payne; Busman, Debra; Diana Garcia (eds.). Fire and Ink: An Anthology of Social Action Writing. The University of Arizona Press, (2009).
- "Hole" in Sweeney, Chad; West, Parthenon (eds.). Days I Moved Through Ordinary Sounds: The Teachers of WritersCorps in Poetry and Prose. City Light Books, (2009).

== Reviews ==
- Bill O'Driscoll's review of The Laundress Catches Her Breath in Pittsburgh City Paper, 2013.
- Amanda O’Connor's review, Word for Word Poetry, Poets of Cavan Kerry Press, 2012.
- Regis Behe's review of Catina's Haircut: A Novel in Stories in Pittsburgh Tribune-Review, 2010.
- Publishers Weekly review of Catina's Haircut: A Novel in Stories, 2010.
- Daniela Gioseffi's review of Giovanna's 86 Circles in Rain Taxi, 2006.
- Bill O'Driscoll's review of Giovanna's 86 Circles in the Pittsburgh City Paper, 2005.
- Publishers Weekly review of Giovanna's 86 Circles, 2005.
- Ann Curran's review of Death by Renaissance: Poems and Photos in the Pittsburgh Post-Gazette, 2004.
- Regis Behe's review of Death by Renaissance, in Pittsburgh Tribune-Review, 2004.

== Honors and awards ==
- Working Class Studies Association's Tillie Olsen Award for Creative Writing for "The Laundress Catches Her Breath," 2013.
- Sons of Italy National Book Club Selection for Catina's Haircut, 2010.
- Giovanna's 86 Circles and Other Stories selected for Public and Secondary School Libraries by the American Association of University Professors, 2008.
- New York Foundation for the Arts Fellow, 2003.
- Sherwood Anderson Foundation Fiction Award Winner, 2000.
- City College of New York's Jerome Lowell Dejur Award for Creative Writing, 1999.
