= The Cemetery of Untold Stories =

2024 novel by Julia Alvarez

- First edition cover
- Author: Julia Alvarez
- Language: English
- Genre: Magical realism, Fiction
- Publisher: Algonquin Books
- Publication date: April 2, 2024
- Media type: Novel
- Pages: 243
- ISBN: 979-8885798648

The Cemetery of Untold Stories: A Novel (2024) is a work of magical realism and the seventh novel by Dominican-American writer Julia Alvarez. The book follows Alma, a prolific author who, after retiring from her teaching job and writing career, inherits a plot of land in the Dominican Republic where she decides to create a cemetery for her unfinished manuscripts and notes.

== Plot ==
Sixty-something Alma Cruz has had a career as a novelist and professor. Upon retiring from academia, she says she’s done with writing as well. She wants most of all to return from the U.S. to her family’s homeland, the Dominican Republic, but she now has to deal with all her boxes full of notes and manuscripts for books she didn’t get around to writing. So, when Alma inherits a plot of land in the Dominican Republic, she builds there a cemetery for her untold stories and characters, whose lives she tried but failed to bring to life.

Alma hires a local woman called Filomena who lives nearby to guard and maintain the cemetery. She burns her boxes of notes and manuscripts except for two that won’t catch fire, one with notes for a book about Alma’s enigmatic father, Dr. Manuel Cruz; the other is research for a book about the second wife of the Dominican dictator Rafael Trujillo forgotten in history, Bienvenida Inocencia Ricardo Trujillo. Alma then decides to bury them in the cemetery using Filomena's help. However, while Alma wants peace for herself and her characters, once buried, the characters begin to make them known as they speak to each other and Filomena. The characters thus reconciliate themselves and take agency in telling their own stories when their storyteller never did.

== Development ==
The novel was written based on Alvarez's own experience as a successful author with "a basement full of [manuscripts]" of unwritten stories:

“When I lost sight in one eye, I felt heartbroken that all my unrealized characters and their unfinished stories might not find the light of day. So, very slowly, with great frustration at first as I learned to work in new ways with compromised vision, I created a place where they could finally be finished”.

In the act of burying stories, the novel connects to Alvarez's Dominican roots "of santería, [and a] spirit world that so much permeates our Caribbean cultures".

== Themes ==
The Cemetery of Untold Stories explores themes related to "friendship, love, sisterhood, living between cultures, and how people can be haunted by the things they don’t finish", as well as "subjects like misogyny, migration, infidelity, and injustice".

== Reception ==
Writing for The Boston Globe, Gabino Iglesias called the novel "a book about the power of narratives and the way they shape us," while NPR's Marcela Davison Avilés referred to it as "a story that's both languorous and urgent in conjuring a world from magical happenings [...] There is always something magical to discover in a story, and that is especially true in Alvarez's landing place".

According to Publishers Weekly, "Alvarez seamlessly melds magical realism with heartfelt character portraits. This brims with the intoxicating power of storytelling." Iglesias also discussed the novel's style, calling it "engaging and written in a playful, crystal-clear prose".
