= Debra Allbery =

American poet

- Born: March 3, 1957 (age 69); Lancaster, Ohio, U.S.
- Citizenship: American
- Occupation: Poet
- Notable work: Walking Distance
- Awards: Agnes Lynch Starrett Poetry Prize (1990)

Debra Allbery (born March 3, 1957, in Lancaster, Ohio) is an American poet.

== Life ==
Allbery is an Ohio native, though she currently lives in Fairview, North Carolina. She has graduated from the College of Wooster, the University of Virginia, and the University of Iowa, has taught at Dickinson College, Randolph College, the University of Michigan, and was the Director of the MFA Program for Writers at Warren Wilson College from 2009 to 2023, where she has served on the poetry faculty since 1995.

Her work has appeared in Crazy Horse, The Missouri Review, Ironwood, Iowa Review, Poetry, Ploughshares, TriQuarterly, The Kenyon Review, and The Yale Review, and she is among the poets included in The Broadview Anthology of Poetry, edited by Herbert Rosengarten and Amanda Goldrick-Jones.

== Awards ==
- 1990 Agnes Lynch Starrett Poetry Prize for Walking Distance
- 1994 Sherwood Anderson Fellowship
- Two NEA fellowships
- 1989 "Discovery"/The Nation prize
- 2010 Grub Street National Book Prize in Poetry

== Works ==
=== Poetry ===
- Walking Distance. University of Pittsburgh Press. 1991. ISBN 978-0-8229-3687-9.
- Fimbul-Winter. Four Way Books. 2010. ISBN 978-1-9355-3604-8.

=== Essays ===
- ""The Third Image": Constellations of Correspondence in Emily Dickinson, Joseph Cornell, and Charles Simic". The Cortland Review. Spring 2008. Archived from the original on 2009-03-17.
