= Nelly Rosario =

Dominican-American novelist

Nelly Rosario (born 1972) is a Dominican-American novelist and creative writing instructor in the Latina/o Studies Program at Williams College. She was born in the Dominican Republic and raised in the Williamsburg section of Brooklyn, NY. She earned an SB in civil/environmental engineering from MIT and an MFA in creative writing from Columbia University. She has taught in the Undergraduate Creative Writing Program at Columbia University, the MFA Program at Texas State University, and was a visiting scholar in the Comparative Media/Writing Program at MIT. Her fiction and creative nonfiction work has appeared in various anthologies and journals.

After the debut of her novel Song of the Water Saints, Rosario was described by Julia Alvarez as "a Caribbean Scheherazade."

== Awards and honors ==
- 1997: Winner, Hurston/Wright Foundation Award in Fiction
- 2001: Named a "Writer on the Verge" by the Village Voice Literary Supplement
- 2002: Winner, PEN Open Book Award
- 2003: Finalist, Hurston/Wright Legacy Award in Debut Fiction
- 2008: Recipient, The Sherwood Anderson Foundation Award for Fiction
- 2015: Recipient, Creative Capital Award
