= Dominican Americans =

Americans of Dominican (Dominican Republic) birth or descent

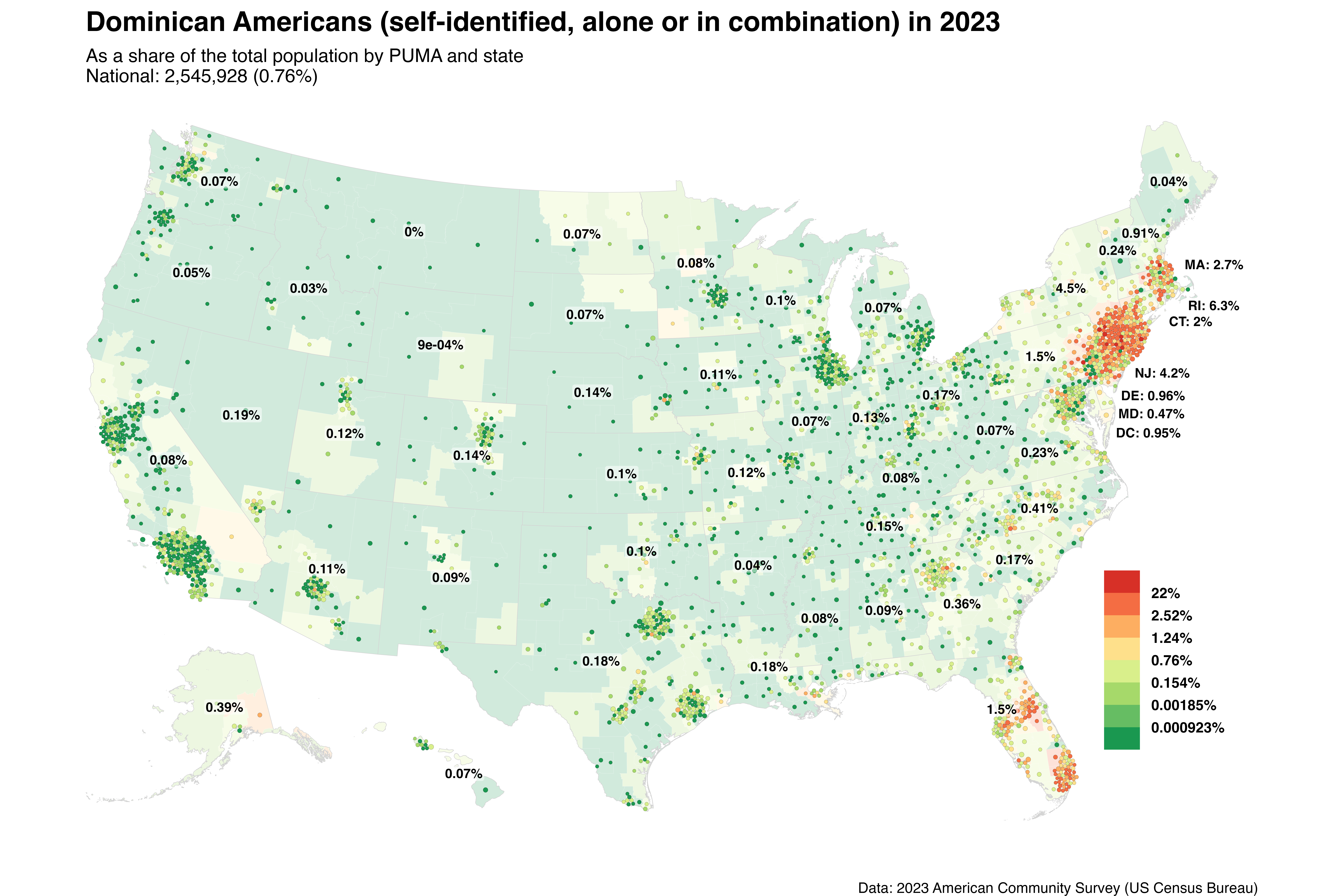

Total population
- 2,539,893; 0.74% of the U.S. population (2024)

Regions with significant populations
- Majority concentrated in New York, Massachusetts, Pennsylvania, New Jersey, Florida, Rhode Island and Connecticut; Smaller numbers in other parts of the country including New Hampshire, Ohio, Delaware, Maryland, Virginia, North Carolina, Georgia and Texas, among other areas.

Languages
- Dominican Spanish, American English, Spanglish

Religion
- Roman Catholicism; Protestantism

Related ethnic groups
- other Latin Americans, Taíno, Afro-Dominicans, White Dominicans, Italian Americans, Spanish Americans, Ukrainian Americans, German Americans, Indian Americans, Filipino Americans, Chinese Americans, Japanese Americans, Korean Americans, Indonesian Americans, Native Americans

Dominican Americans (Spanish: domínico-americanos, estadounidenses dominicanos) are Americans who trace their ancestry to the Dominican Republic. The term may refer to someone born in the United States of Dominican descent or to someone who has migrated to the United States from the Dominican Republic. As of 2024, there were approximately 2.5 million people of Dominican descent in the United States, including both native and foreign-born. They are the second largest Hispanic group in the Northeastern region of the United States after Puerto Ricans, and the fifth-largest Hispanic/Latino group nationwide.

The first Dominican to migrate into what is now known as the United States was sailor-turned-merchant Juan Rodríguez who arrived in Manhattan in 1613 from his home in Santo Domingo. Thousands of Dominicans also passed through the gates of Ellis Island in the 19th and early 20th centuries. The most recent movement of emigration to the United States began in the 1960s, after the fall of the dictatorial Trujillo regime.

== History ==
Since the establishment of the Spanish Empire, there have historically been immigrants from the former Captaincy General of Santo Domingo to other parts of New Spain which are now part of the United States, such as Florida, Louisiana and the Southwest. The first recorded person of Dominican descent to migrate into what is now known as the United States, outside of New Spain, was sailor-turned-merchant Juan Rodríguez. He arrived on Manhattan in 1613 from his home in Santo Domingo, which makes him the first non-Native American person to spend substantial time in the island. He also became the first Dominican, the first Hispanic and the first person with European (specifically Portuguese) and African ancestry to settle in what is present day New York City.

=== 20th century ===
Dominican emigration to the United States continued throughout the centuries. Recent studies from the CUNY Dominican studies Institute identified 5,000 Dominican nationals who were processed through Ellis Island between 1892 and 1924.

During the 1930s and 40s, the flow of Dominicans to the United States fluctuated after Rafael Trujillo, who rose to power in 1930, imposed heavy restrictions on the outward migration of his citizens. Many of the 1,150 Dominicans immigrating to the United States between 1931 and 1940, came as secondary labor migrants from Cuba, Puerto Rico and Panama.

A larger wave of Dominicans began after 1950, during a time when cracks began to appear in the Trujillo regime. Dominican immigrants during this period where largely classified as anti-Trujilo political exiles. During that decade, the United States admitted an average of 990 Dominican nationals per year.

During the second half of the twentieth century there were three significant waves of immigration to the United States. The first period began in 1961, when a coalition of high-ranking Dominicans, with assistance from the CIA, assassinated General Rafael Trujillo, the nation's military dictator. In the wake of his death, fear of retaliation by Trujillo's allies, and political uncertainty in general, spurred migration from the island. In 1965, the United States began a military occupation of the Dominican Republic and eased travel restrictions, making it easier for Dominicans to obtain American visas.

From 1966 to 1978, the exodus continued, fueled by high unemployment and political repression. Communities established by the first wave of immigrants to the U.S. created a network that assisted subsequent arrivals. In the early 1980s, unemployment, inflation and the rise in value of the dollar all contributed to the third and largest wave of emigration from the island nation, this time mostly from the lower-class. Today, emigration from the Dominican Republic remains high, facilitated by the social networks of now-established Dominican communities in the United States. Until about the early 2000s, the majority of immigration from the Dominican Republic came from the Cibao region and "La Capital" (Santo Domingo area). However now, Dominican immigrants are arriving to the United States from many parts of the country.

== Demographics ==
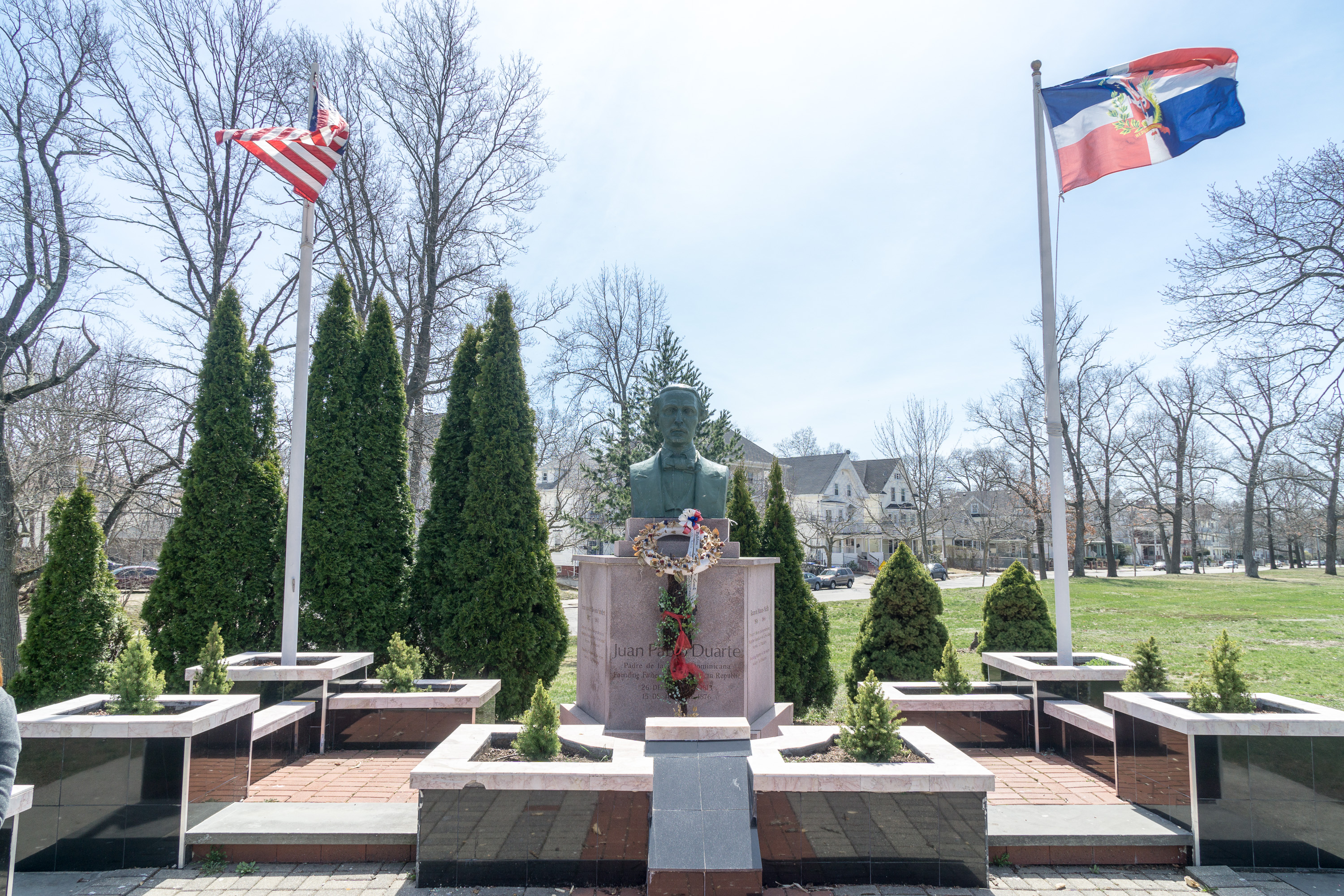
Juan Pablo Duarte memorial, Roger Williams Park, Providence, Rhode Island

Almost half of all the Dominican Americans today arrived since the 1990s, especially in the early part of that decade. There has been another surge of immigration in recent years as immigration from Mexico has declined, which allowed more backlogged Dominican applicants to obtain legal residence. Dominican Americans are the fifth-largest Hispanic American group, after Mexican Americans, Stateside Puerto Ricans, Cuban Americans and Salvadoran Americans.

Although Dominicans constitute 3.5 percent of the Hispanic/Latino population in the United States, there are some states where Dominicans make up a much larger portion of the Hispanic/Latino population, including Rhode Island, where 29.5 percent of the state's Hispanics/Latinos are of Dominican descent and New York, where Dominicans make up 22.0 percent of the Hispanics/Latinos. Other states where Dominicans make up a remarkably large portion of the Hispanic/Latino community include Massachusetts, where they make up 19.7 percent of all Hispanics, New Jersey at 16.4 percent, New Hampshire at 15.0 percent, Pennsylvania at 13.9 percent, Connecticut at 8.1 percent, and Florida at 4.8 percent of all Hispanics/Latinos in each respective state. U.S. states with higher percentages of Dominicans than the national average (0.6%) as of 2020, are Rhode Island (4.9%), New York (4.4%), New Jersey (3.5%), Massachusetts (2.6%), Connecticut (1.5%), Florida (1.3%), and Pennsylvania (1.2%).

As of 2017, the majority of Dominican Americans are in a handful of states, including New York (872,504; 4.4% of state population), New Jersey (301,655; 3.3%), Florida (259,799; 1.2%), Massachusetts (172,707; 2.5%), Pennsylvania (146,329; 1.0%), Rhode Island (52,100; 5.1%) and Connecticut (40,543; 1.1%). Around 47% of Dominican Americans live in New York state with 41% in New York City alone; close to 40% of all Dominicans in the city live in the Bronx. Rhode Island has the highest percentage of Dominicans in the country and it is the only state where Dominicans are the largest Hispanic group. Dominicans are the most dominant Hispanic group in most of southeastern New England (Rhode Island and eastern Massachusetts). Dominicans are also becoming more dominant in many areas in North Jersey and the Lower Hudson Valley, including the northern portion of the New York City area like the Bronx and Westchester. In New York City, the borough of Manhattan (New York County) is the only county in the country where Dominicans are the largest ancestral group and its Washington Heights neighborhood has long been considered the center of the Dominican American community. The 2010 Census estimated the nationwide Dominican American population at 1,414,703.

About 41% of Dominican Americans live in New York City alone. Many of New York's Dominicans live in the boroughs of the Bronx and Manhattan, and to a lesser degree in Queens and Brooklyn. There are also small populations in other parts of New York State, like Long Island in towns like Uniondale, Freeport and Brentwood being engulfed by the Salvadoran population, and the Hudson Valley including cities like Yonkers, Haverstraw, Sleepy Hollow and Newburgh. A rapidly growing population of up to 250,000 Dominicans reside across the Hudson River in New Jersey, topped by Paterson in absolute number and with Perth Amboy having the highest proportion in the U.S., alongside other areas of New Jersey, including cities like Jersey City, Union City (even though Union City is mostly Cuban descent) and Newark and many other areas in Passaic County and Hudson County. In Massachusetts, there is a very large Dominican population throughout the eastern part of the state, especially Boston, Lawrence, Lynn, Holyoke and many other parts of the Boston area. Lawrence in particular has one of the highest percentages of Dominicans in the nation alongside Perth Amboy, New Jersey; Haverstraw, New York; and Hazleton, Pennsylvania. In Rhode Island, there is a large Dominican population throughout the state, especially Providence County, including the cities of Providence, Cranston, and Pawtucket. To a lesser extent, Connecticut has small Dominican populations in Fairfield County, New Haven County, and New London County, including the cities of Waterbury, Danbury, Bridgeport, Stamford, and New London. In Pennsylvania, there are sizeable Dominican populations in the eastern portion of the state, including Philadelphia, Hazleton, Bethlehem, Allentown and Reading. Hazleton in Pennsylvania has one of the fastest growing Dominican communities in the nation, going from 1% in the 2000 census to about 35% according to the 2017 estimate. There are also large Dominican populations in Florida, including in Miami, Pembroke Pines, Orlando, Kissimmee, Tampa and many other parts of the Miami and Orlando metropolitan areas. There are also much smaller but growing Dominican populations in New Hampshire, Ohio, Delaware, Maryland, Virginia, North Carolina, Georgia, and Texas, as well as the U.S. territories of Puerto Rico and the U.S. Virgin Islands, in the former of which Dominicans make up the majority of recent immigrants. If Puerto Rico were to be counted among US states, it would have the 6th largest Dominican population, the city of San Juan would have the 8th largest Dominican population (27,641 Dominicans) compared to other US cities, and the San Juan metropolitan area would have the 7th largest Dominican population when comparing US metro areas, with 49,971 in the metro area as of 2020, most of Puerto Rico's Dominican population is in the San Juan metro area, roughly half in the city alone.

Since 2010, there has been huge increases in the Dominican population in New York City (especially the Bronx), but also significant increases in Boston, Philadelphia, Miami, Orlando and many smaller cities throughout the coastal Northeast. According to 2014 estimates, Boston and New York City are the only major cities where Dominicans are now the largest Hispanic group, recently surpassing Puerto Ricans in both cities, due to slower growth (Boston) or decline (New York City) of the Puerto Rican populations in those cities and much faster growing Dominican populations. However, in both cities, Dominicans make up only a plurality of the Hispanic population. As of 2017, the New York City Area, which includes southern New York state and North Jersey, has nearly 1.1 million Dominicans, making up about 5.3% of the New York metro area and nearly 60% of the Dominican American community, the highest percentage of any metropolitan area. However, even though Dominicans are now the largest Hispanic group in New York City itself, Dominicans are still second in size to Puerto Ricans in the New York metropolitan area as a whole. The Boston metropolitan area is the only major metropolitan area where Dominicans are the largest Hispanic group, recently surpassing Puerto Ricans. The Providence area also has a huge Dominican-dominant Hispanic community.

=== New York City ===
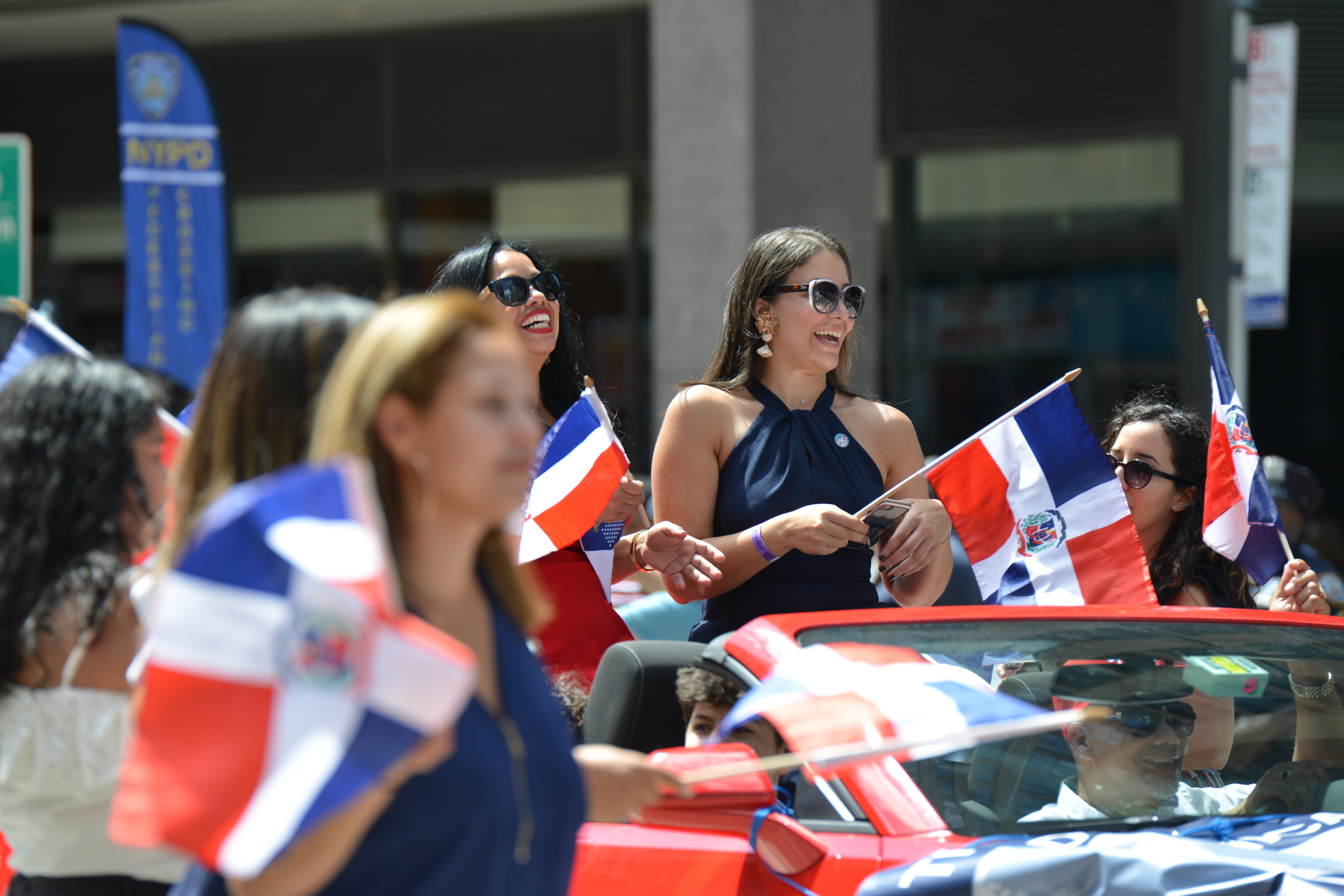
Dominicans in New York Dominican day parade.

New York City has had a large Dominican community since as early as the 1960s. However, the community did not start to boom until the 1980s. Since then, Washington Heights in Upper Manhattan has remained the center of the Dominican American community, often nicknamed "Little Santo Domingo". The eastern portions of Washington Heights and Inwood, as well as many western areas of the Bronx, such as Highbridge, University Heights, among others, have some of the largest urban concentration of Dominicans in the US.

Many other areas, like Cypress Hills and Bushwick in Brooklyn and Corona, Queens have strong Dominican populations. Despite strong segregation, Dominicans can be seen in many different neighborhoods throughout New York. New York City, as of 2017, has nearly 800,000 Dominicans, over half of them in the Bronx and Manhattan. New York Dominicans usually share communities with other Hispanics, particularly Puerto Ricans and other Hispanics from Mexico and South/Central America, African Americans, West Indian/African immigrants, and caucasian. Dominicans recently became the city's largest Hispanic population, dethroning the older longstanding Puerto Rican population, they now make up 9% of New York City and nearly 35% of New York Hispanics. Dominicans have strong and growing influential clout and political power in the New York City area.

=== Geographic distribution ===
State	Dominican Population (2020 census)	% (2020)	(2010 Census)	% (2010)
Alabama	2,498	0.0%	852	0.0%
Alaska	2,645	0.3%	1,909	0.3%
Arizona	6,732	0.0%	3,103	0.0%
Arkansas	965	0.0%	384	0.0%
California	23,250	0.0%	11,455	0.0%
Colorado	4,321	0.1%	1,744	0.0%
Connecticut	50,224	1.5%	26,093	0.7%
Delaware	4,189	0.4%	2,035	0.2%
District of Columbia	3,479	0.5%	2,508	0.4%
Florida	275,096	1.3%	172,451	0.9%
(Georgia (U.S. state)) Georgia	31,026	0.2%	14,941	0.2%
Hawaii	1,424	0.0%	600	0.0%
Idaho	528	0.0%	185	0.0%
Illinois	10,316	0.0%	5,691	0.0%
Indiana	5,594	0.0%	2,340	0.0%
Iowa	1,106	0.0%	429	0.0%
Kansas	1,435	0.0%	764	0.0%
Kentucky	2,055	0.0%	1,065	0.0%
Louisiana	6,946	0.1%	3,238	0.1%
Maine	1,057	0.0%	610	0.0%
Maryland	27,027	0.4%	14,873	0.3%
Massachusetts	175,130	2.6%	103,292	1.6%
Michigan	8,587	0.0%	5,012	0.1%
Minnesota	3,341	0.0%	1,294	0.0%
Mississippi	1,568	0.0%	733	0.0%
Missouri	2,918	0.0%	1,503	0.0%
Montana	203	0.0%	95	0.0%
Nebraska	871	0.0%	353	0.0%
Nevada	4,690	0.1%	2,446	0.1%
New Hampshire	8,914	0.6%	4,460	0.3%
New Jersey	328,092	3.5%	197,922	2.3%
New Mexico	1,478	0.0%	492	0.0%
New York	867,304	4.4%	674,787	3.5%
North Carolina	33,353	0.3%	15,225	0.2%
North Dakota	363	0.0%	90	0.0%
Ohio	13,999	0.1%	6,453	0.0%
Oklahoma	1,732	0.0%	727	0.0%
Oregon	1,552	0.0%	574	0.0%
Pennsylvania	146,329	1.2%	62,348	0.5%
Rhode Island	53,676	4.9%	35,008	3.3%
South Carolina	7,604	0.1%	3,018	0.1%
South Dakota	289	0.0%	79	0.0%
Tennessee	5,313	0.0%	2,113	0.0%
Texas	33,917	0.1%	13,353	0.0%
Utah	3,085	0.1%	1,252	0.0%
Vermont	550	0.0%	282	0.0%
Virginia	19,713	0.2%	10,504	0.1%
Washington	4,764	0.0%	1,819	0.0%
West Virginia	726	0.0%	363	0.0%
Wisconsin	3,881	0.0%	1,786	0.0%
Wyoming	129	0.0%	45	0.0%
Total U.S. Dominican population	2,196,076	0.6%	1,414,703	0.5%

The largest populations of Dominicans are in the following metropolitan areas, according to the 2020 ACS 5-Year Estimates:

1. New York-Northern New Jersey-Long Island, NY-NJ-PA MSA - 1,088,442
2. Boston-Cambridge-Quincy, MA-NH MSA - 137,310
3. Miami-Fort Lauderdale-Pompano Beach, FL MSA - 119,176
4. Philadelphia-Camden-Wilmington, PA-NJ-DE-MD MSA - 57,025
5. Providence-Warwick, RI-MA MSA - 56,945
6. Orlando-Kissimmee-Sanford, FL MSA - 53,694
7. Tampa-St. Petersburg-Clearwater, FL MSA - 30,678
8. Washington-Arlington-Alexandria, DC-VA-MD-WV MSA - 28,316
9. Allentown-Bethlehem-Easton, PA-NJ MSA - 27,564
10. Atlanta-Sandy Springs-Alpharetta MSA - 21,075

As of the 2020 census, the top 25 U.S. communities with the largest Dominican populations are the following:

1. New York City, NY – 702,330
2. Lawrence, MA – 48,135
3. Paterson, NJ – 44,226
4. Boston, MA – 37,067
5. Providence, RI – 34,832
6. Philadelphia, PA – 33,344
7. Yonkers, NY – 30,291
8. Perth Amboy, NJ – 23,362
9. Newark, NJ – 20,946
10. Allentown, PA – 20,646
11. Reading, PA – 18,575
12. Jersey City, NJ – 17,973
13. Passaic, NJ – 15,809
14. Lynn, MA – 13,995
15. Hazleton, PA – 13,646
16. Elizabeth, NJ – 13,075
17. Miami, FL – 11,990
18. Union City, NJ – 11,685
19. Methuen, MA – 8,772
20. Clifton, NJ – 8,558
21. Worcester, MA – 7,808
22. Pembroke Pines, FL – 7,557
23. Freeport, NY – 7,268
24. Orlando, FL – 7,161
25. Camden, NJ – 6,967

As of the 2020 census, the top 25 U.S. communities with the highest percentages of people claiming Dominican ancestry are the following:

1. Lawrence, MA – 53.9%
2. Hazleton, PA – 45.5%
3. Perth Amboy, NJ – 42.1%
4. Haverstraw, NY – 41.1%
5. Paterson, NJ – 27.6%
6. The Bronx (NYC borough), NY – 22.7%
7. Passaic, NJ – 22.4%
8. Sleepy Hollow, NY – 21.2%
9. Reading, PA – 19.5%
10. Providence, RI – 18.2%
11. Union City, NJ – 17.0%
12. Methuen, MA – 16.5%
13. Allentown, PA – 16.4%
14. Freeport, NY – 16.3%
15. Yonkers, NY – 14.3%
16. Lynn, MA – 13.8%
17. Salem, MA – 11.8%
18. West New York, NJ – 11.4%
19. Lodi, NJ – 10.3%
20. Bergenfield, NJ – 10.1%
21. Hackensack, NJ – 10.0%
22. Elizabeth, NJ – 9.9%
23. Camden, NJ – 9.7%
24. Haverhill, MA – 9.5%
25. Clifton, NJ – 9.4%

The 10 large cities (over 200,000 in population) with the highest percentages of Dominican residents include (2020 Census):

1. Yonkers, NY – 14.3%
2. New York City, NY – 7.9%
3. Newark, NJ – 6.7%
4. Jersey City, NJ – 6.1%
5. Boston, MA – 5.4%
6. Worcester, MA – 3.7%
7. Miami, FL – 2.7%
8. Orlando, FL – 2.3%
9. Philadelphia, PA – 2.0%
10. Hialeah, FL – 1.6%

== Race and identity ==
Since 1980, the Census Bureau has asked U.S. residents to classify their race separately from their Hispanic origin, if any.

In 2010, 29.6% of Dominican Americans responded that they were white, while 12.9% considered themselves black. A majority of 57.5% chose the category 'Other race'.

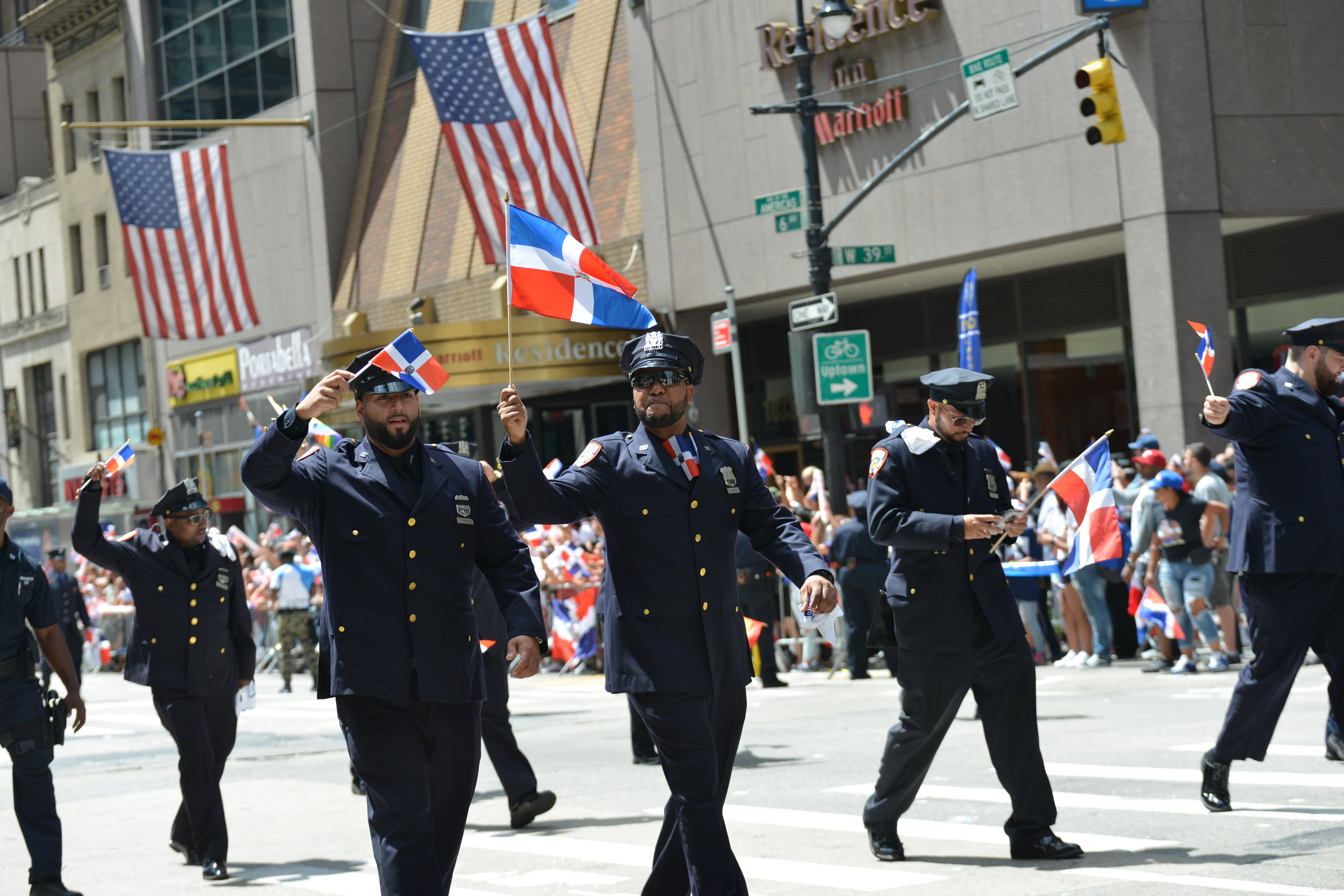
Dominican NYCDOC officers in the Dominican day parade, New York.

The prevalence of the 'other race' category probably reflects the large number of people who identify as mixed tri-racial ancestry in the Dominican Republic, where 73% of the population identified as of mixed, similar to other Caribbean Hispanics. According to recent genealogical DNA studies of Dominicans, the genetic makeup is predominantly European and Sub-Saharan African, with a lesser degree of Native American ancestry. Spaniard ancestry tends to be strongest in the interior Cibao region (60-80% average), while African is strongest in the southeast plain.

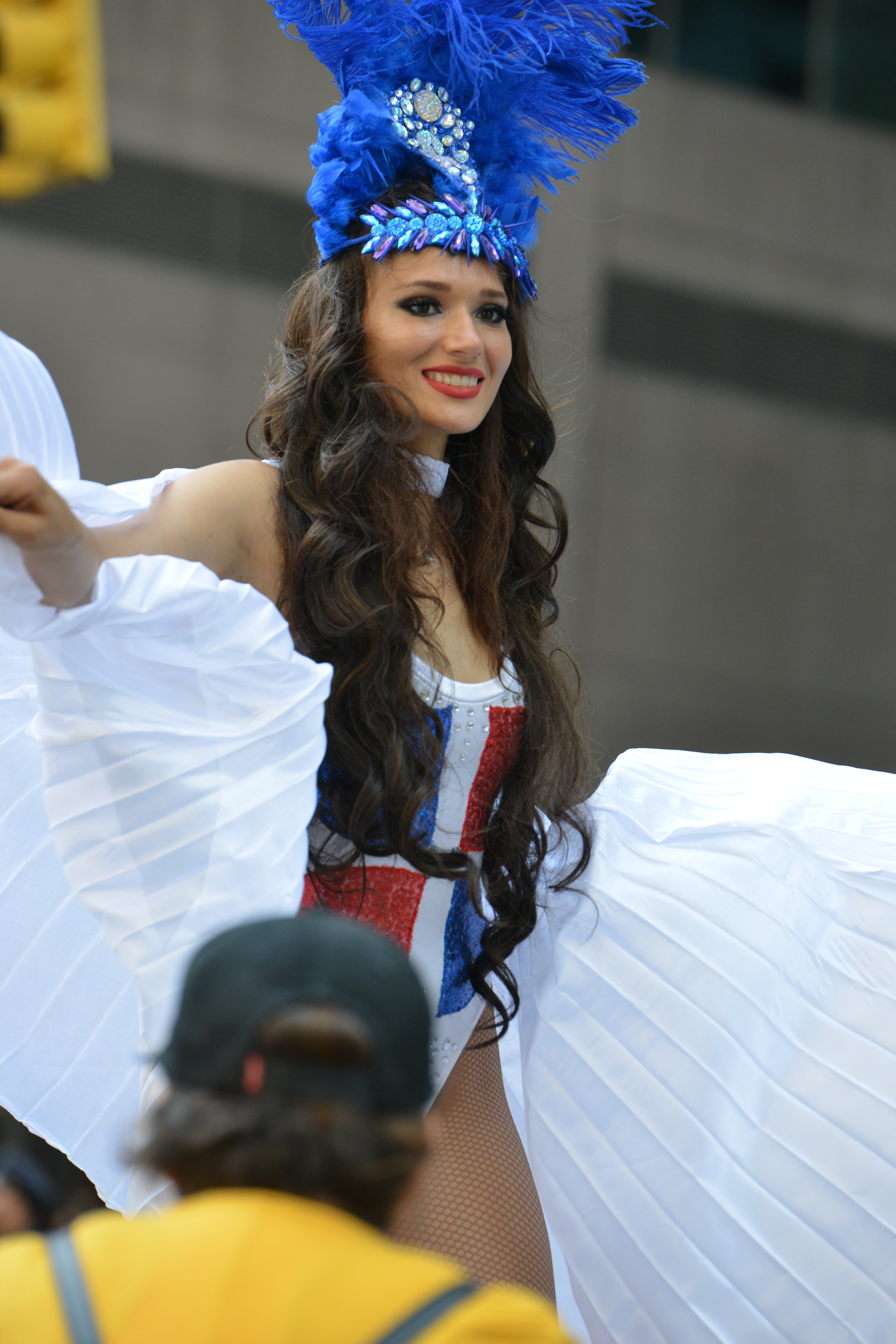
Dominican flag dress in Dominican Day Parade.

According to the 2013 Pew Research Center survey there is an estimation about 1.8 million of Dominican origin that are residing in the United States which account for 3.3% of the US Hispanic population in 2013. When they were asked to identify themselves about 66% of them said they used the term 'Dominican', 16% use 'Americans', and 17% use the terms 'Hispanic' or 'Latino'. Those that prefer the term Hispanic is 29%, 11% prefer the term 'Latino', and the rest have no preference for either of the terms 'Latino' and Hispanic. When they were asked if they believed to be American about 53% did see themselves as American, 49% Hispanic adults were more likely to see themselves as typical American than the 44% that saw themselves different from the typical American. More than 55% of Dominican Americans are foreign-born.

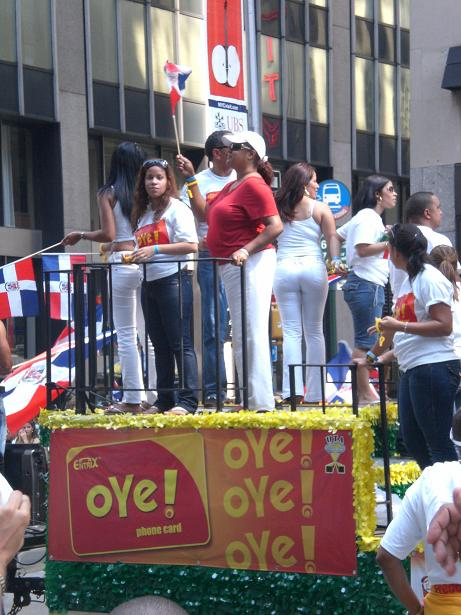
The Dominican Day Parade in New York City, a major destination for Dominican emigrants.

Dominican Americans have a Latin Caribbean culture similar to Puerto Ricans and Cubans, they also have very high intermarriage and procreation rates with Puerto Ricans. The intermarriage of Dominicans with partners of other ethnicities sometimes creates circumstances that, depending on the dominant ethnic presence in the environment surrounding the family, may lead the children to identify with the ancestry of one of their parents rather than the other. Poet Sandra Maria Esteves has identified mainly with the ethnicity of her Puerto Rican father rather than that of her Dominican mother.

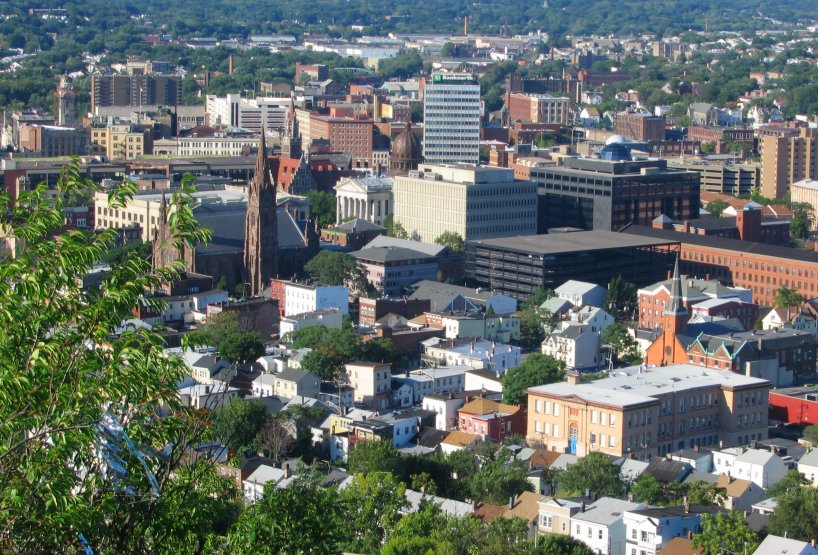
Paterson, New Jersey, known as the "Silk City" in the New York City Metropolitan Area, has become a prime destination for one of the fastest-growing communities of Dominican Americans, who have become the largest of more than 50 ethnic groups in the city, numbering in the tens of thousands.

In contrast to Puerto Ricans who have high overall intermarriage rates with non Hispanics, Dominican Americans have the lowest intermarriage and interracial reproduction rates of all major Hispanic groups with populations over 500,000. Majority of Dominican Americans marry and create families with other Dominican Americans, smaller numbers with other Hispanics especially Puerto Ricans as stated earlier. Only 2.8% of marriages involving a Dominican American are with a non-Hispanic partner.

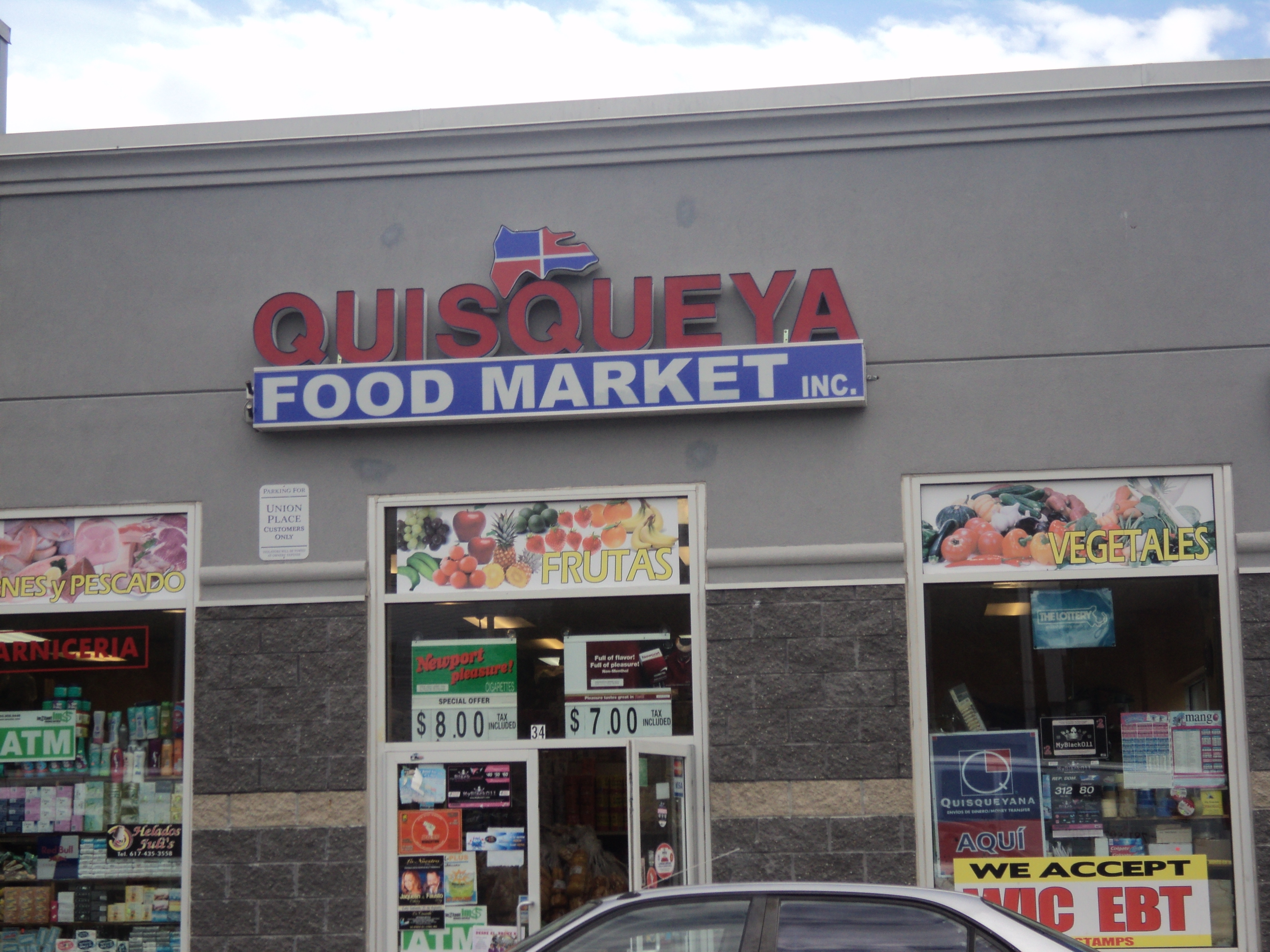
A Dominican American grocery store.

Cities with the highest percentages of Dominicans are usually smaller cities that are 40% Latino or higher, with large Dominican populations and many times larger numbers of other Hispanic groups as well, including Providence, Rhode Island; Allentown, Pennsylvania; Lawrence, Massachusetts; and Paterson, New Jersey, among others. Among neighborhoods in larger cities like New York City, Dominicans usually settle in neighborhoods that are majority Hispanic, like Washington Heights, Bushwick, Jackson Heights, and many areas of the Bronx. The South Bronx, west of the Bronx river and south of Fordham Road, is around 70% Hispanic, a majority of which is Dominicans and Puerto Ricans.

Dominican Americans tend to be heavily focused on issues in Dominican Republic, rather than that of the United States, with many having intentions of returning. It is normal in the Dominican American community to work in the United States and later invest the money in a house and business back in Dominican Republic. Dominican American investments are a major contribution to the economy of the Dominican Republic. A large portion of Dominican immigrants and Dominican Americans engage in circular migration, in which they would live the early years working in the United States to retire the later years in Dominican Republic, or frequently relocate between homes in the United States and the Dominican Republic, oftentimes a home of a family member.

Race by Latino Origin Group
U.S. Census Bureau	White	Black/African American	Asian; American Indian and Alaska Native; Native Hawaiian and other Pacific Islander	Some Other Race	Two or More Races (Multiracial)
1990	29.3%	24.6%	0.5%	44.8%	—
2000	22.7%	8.9%	1.1%	58.4%	9.0%
2010	29.6%	12.9%	1.8%	46.0%	9.7%

== Socioeconomics ==
A significant number of Dominican Americans are young, first-generation immigrants without a higher education, since many have roots in the country's rural areas. Second-generation Dominican Americans are more educated than their first-generation counterparts, a condition reflected in their higher incomes and employment in professional or skilled occupations and more of them pursuing undergraduate education and graduate degrees.

Over 21% of all second-generation Dominican Americans have college degrees, slightly below the average for all Americans (24%) but significantly higher than US-born Mexican Americans (14%) and Stateside Puerto Ricans (9%). In New York City, Dominican entrepreneurs have carved out roles in several industries, especially the bodega and supermarket and taxi and black car industries.

== Political participation ==
Over two dozen Dominican Americans are elected local or state legislators, mayors, or other in New York, New Jersey, Rhode Island, Maryland, Massachusetts, and Pennsylvania.

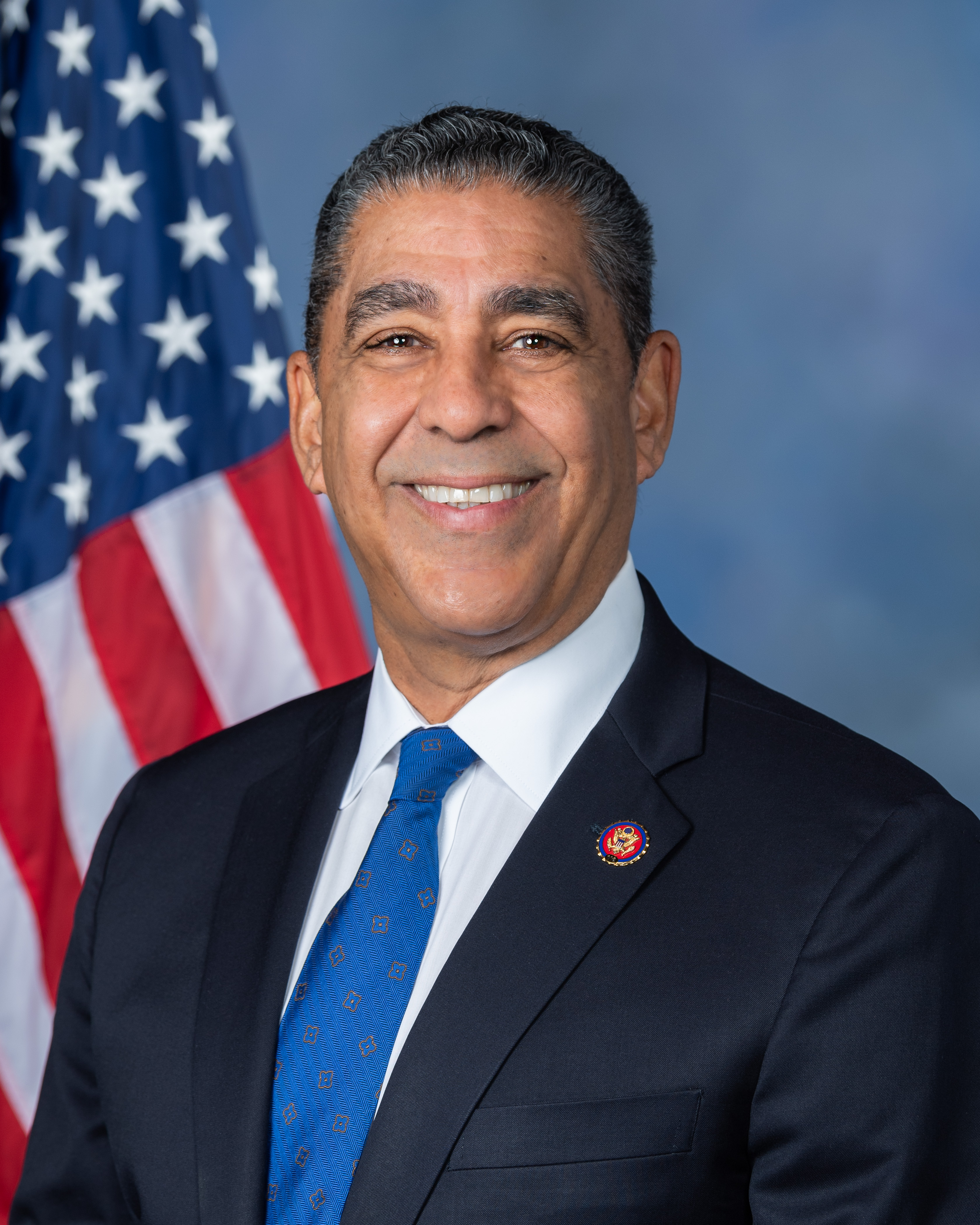
U.S. Congressman Adriano Espaillat

In November 2016, Adriano Espaillat became the first Dominican American to serve in the United States Congress. He represents New York's 13th congressional district, which is predominantly Dominican American. He also became the first formerly undocumented immigrant American to serve in Congress. Prior to being elected to the U.S. Congress, in 1997 he had also become the first Dominican-born member of the New York State Legislature, as well as the first Dominican elected to a state house in the United States.

Dr. Eduardo J. Sanchez was the Commissioner of Health for the state of Texas from 2001 to 2006, and Lorraine Cortés-Vázquez, of Puerto Rican and Dominican descent, held her post as New York Secretary of State from 2007 to 2010.

The electoral participation of Dominicans in the United States may improve as a result of the 1994 approval of dual citizenship by the Dominican legislature, which makes it easier for migrants to become U.S. citizens without relinquishing their Dominican nationality. A 1997 Dominican law, which took effect in 2004, allows Dominicans living abroad to retain their Dominican citizenship and voting rights even if they become citizens of another country.

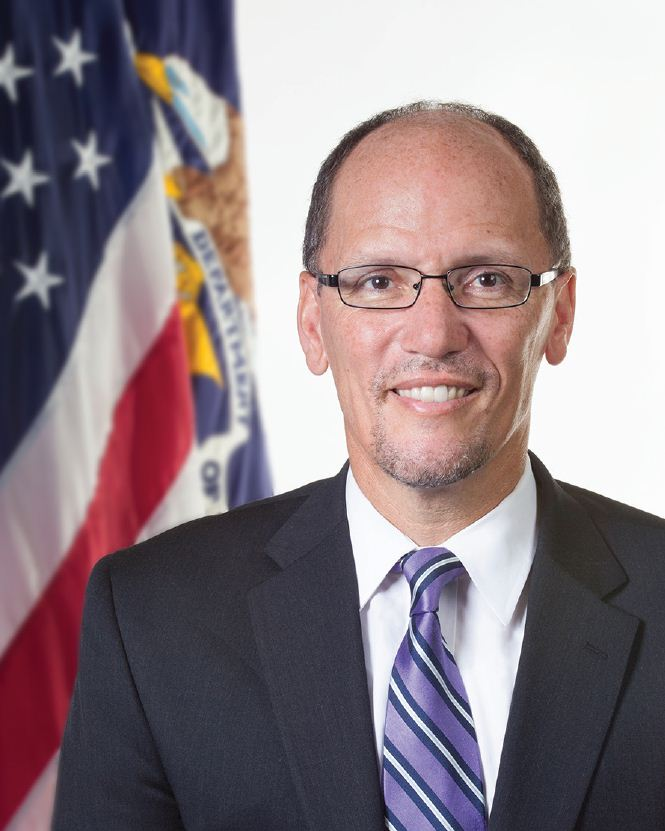
Tom Perez served as chairman of the Democratic party from 2017 to 2021.

Traditionally, Dominicans living in the United States are passionately involved in politics "back home", but unlike other Hispanic/Latino national groups, such as Cuban Americans and Mexican Americans, they are not as inclined to take an active part in U.S. politics, but recent research has shown an increasing involvement in this area.

Voter participation among Dominicans living in the U.S. is low, especially among the foreign-born. Foreign-born Dominicans are more involved in Dominican politics than U.S. politics. Most Foreign-born Dominicans and some U.S.-born Dominicans are more socially conservative, religious, very family-oriented, and exert Dominican nationalist and cultural pride, traits that align more with the U.S. Republican party. However, most U.S.-born Dominican Americans, especially in urban areas in the Northeast, tend to far more liberal than foreign-born Dominicans and Dominican Americans from other parts of the country, ones who are registered to vote tend to do so for the Democratic Party, though support for the Republican party has been growing among Dominican Americans and other Hispanic/Latino people. In 2020, Joe Biden carried Dominican American voters with 64% support to Trump's 33%, according to voter surveys conducted by the Associated Press. Biden won Dominican American neighborhoods of New York City 85%-15%, according to a post-election New York Times analysis of precincts.

== Culture and notable people ==
=== Arts and literature ===
Junot Díaz drew on his life and the Dominican American experience generally in authoring Drown and The Brief Wondrous Life of Oscar Wao, the latter of which won him the Pulitzer Prize for Fiction in 2008 and made him the first Dominican American and the second Hispanic American in history to win the Pulitzer Prize. Julia Alvarez is the nationally recognized author of In the Time of the Butterflies, a fictional book based on the lives of the Mirabal sisters, and How the García Girls Lost Their Accents. Nelly Rosario, born in the Dominican Republic and raised in New York City, also won critical acclaim for her debut novel Song of the Water Saints.

Héctor Rivera was a Dominican poet who lived in New York. He was born in Yamasá, República Dominicana in 1957 and died from cancer in July 2005. He lived during the diaspora, in which Dominican authors wrote about nostalgia that Dominican immigrants experienced in New York. Some of his works include: "Los emigrantes del siglo", Poemas no comunes para matar la muerte, and Biografía del silencio.

Another Dominican American writer and poet, Elizabeth Acevedo, was born in New York City. She is the winner 2018 National Book Award for Young People's Literature, the Boston Globe-Hornbook Award Prize for Best Children's Fiction, and the Pura Belpré Award. She also won the National Poetry Slam Competition. She received her bachelor's degree at The George Washington University in performing arts, and she received her MFA in creative writing at the University of Maryland. Some of her works include Beastgirl & Other Origin Myths, The Poet X, With The Fire On High, "Afro-Latina" and "Hair".

=== Business ===
Dominican Americans have increasingly made a presence in the financial industry. Cid Wilson was ranked #1 Wall Street financial analyst in the Specialty Retailing category by Forbes in 2006. On July 14, 2014, he was named President & CEO of the Hispanic Association on Corporate Responsibility (HACR) in Washington, DC, thus becoming the first Afro-Latino to lead a major national Latino organization in the U.S.

Julio A. Portalatin, chairman and CEO of Mercer LLC (subsidiary of Marsh & McLennan Companies), is the highest ranking Dominican American Fortune 500 executive in the U.S.

=== Cuisine ===
Traditional Dominican cuisine has translated well to the United States as Dominican Americans have opened reputable restaurants throughout the diasporic communities. Traditional cuisine is very colorful with red and green peppers and cilantro. Traditional cuisine consists of rice, beans, tostones (known as fritos), and a meat like chicharrón de pollo (deep-fried chicken), mangú (mashed green plantains served with sautéed onion), slices of avocado, fried eggs, salami, empanadas and pastelitos (fried meat pies), and sancocho (stew of meats and root vegetables).

The most well known drink is "Morir Soñando" which translates to "die dreaming". It is a drink of orange juice, cream and vanilla. Desserts include flan, bread pudding, rice pudding and tres leches.

=== Religion ===
The vast majority of Dominicans adhere to Christianity, with most being Roman Catholic and many others being Protestant. Some Dominican Americans are non-religious, while a few others practice African diasporic religions like Dominican Vudú. It is estimated that 59% of Dominican Americans are Catholic, 21% are Protestant, together Christianity makes up 80%. Another 16% are non-religious and 4% practice other religions.

=== Language ===
The Dominican American community is split between those that only know Spanish and little to no English, and those that are fully bilingual in both languages. Very few Dominican Americans speak English only and no Spanish, as preserving aspects of Dominican identity, including the Spanish language, is very important to Dominican Americans. About 51% of Dominican Americans are Spanish-dominant, 5% are English-dominant, and 44% are fully bilingual. Dominicans who only speak English fluently usually come from families that been in the United States for many generations. In many cities in the Northeast region, the Dominican dialect of Spanish is the most commonly heard. Spanish is spoken at home by 88% of Dominican American families, higher compared to 73% of the overall Latino community.

=== Film, stage, and television ===
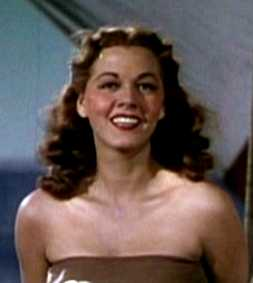
Dominican actress Maria Montez in 1944.

Maria Montez was dubbed "The Queen of Technicolor" for the numerous Hollywood adventure films that she starred in the 1940s. Zoe Saldaña, the female lead of the 2009 film Avatar, is an actress born in New Jersey, but raised in the Dominican Republic, to a Dominican father and a half-Dominican, half-Puerto Rican mother. Michelle Rodriguez, born of a Dominican mother and a Puerto Rican father, is known for her roles on the television series Lost and the films The Fast and the Furious, S.W.A.T. and Resident Evil.

Judy Reyes, best known for her roles as Carla Espinosa on the medical comedy series Scrubs (2001–2009) and Zoila Diaz in the Lifetime comedy-drama series Devious Maids (2013–2016) are both actresses born in The Bronx, New York to Dominican immigrants.

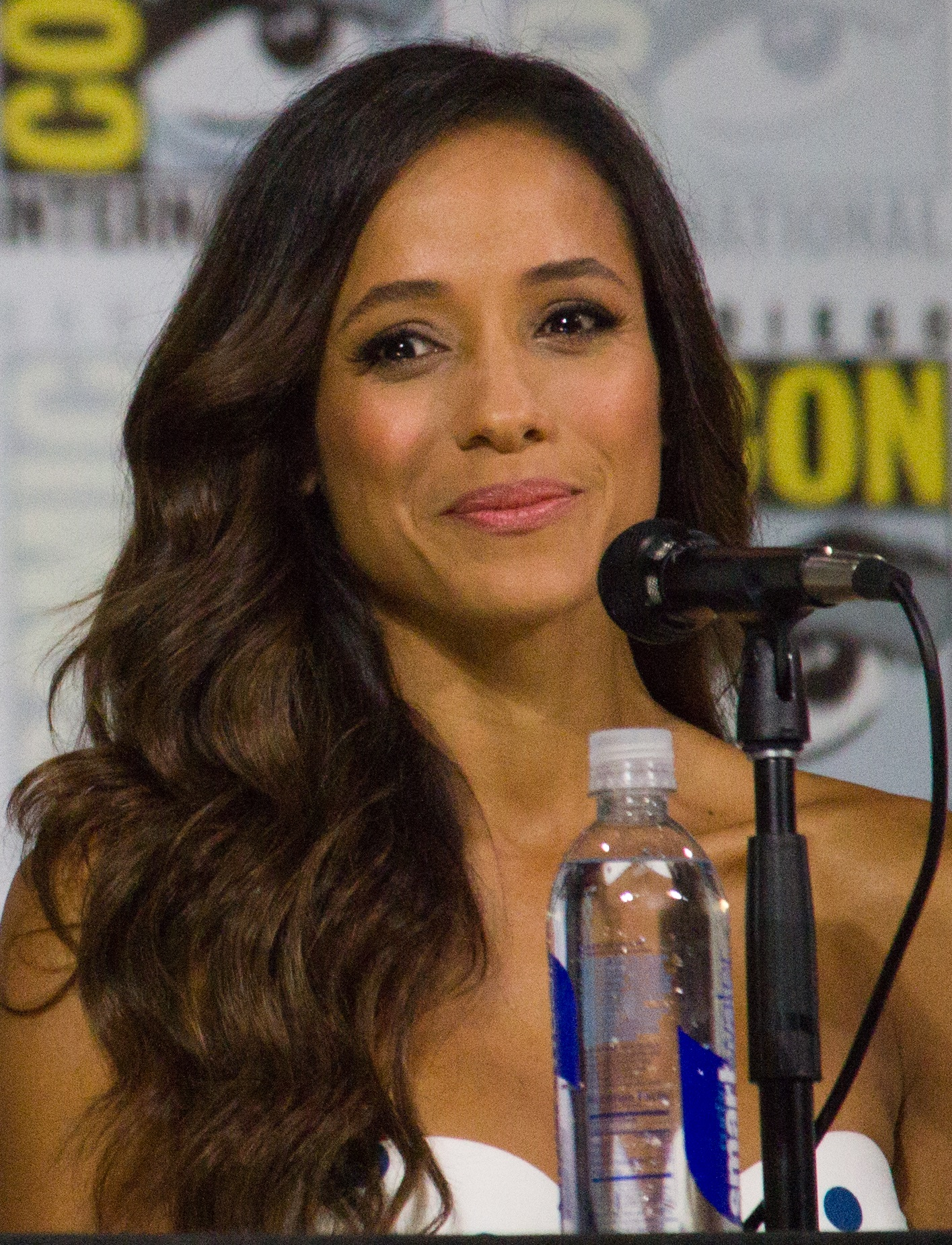
Dania Ramirez

Dania Ramirez is known for playing Callisto in X-Men: The Last Stand, Sadie in Quarantine, Alex on Entourage and Maya Herrera on Heroes. Merlin Santana was a New Yorker whose most notable role was as Romeo on The Steve Harvey Show. Carlos De La Mota, born in New York to Dominican parents and raised in La Vega, and José Guillermo Cortines are popular telenovela actors who often work stateside.

Claudette Lali is a former model turned actress also born in New York and raised in the Dominican Republic. Charytín is an actress, singer, dancer, and television host who has been a longtime fixture in the U.S. Latino media. Tina Aumont, Miguel A. Nuñez, Karen Olivo (a Tony Award winner), Victor Rasuk, Shalim Ortiz (son of Charytín) and Tristan Wilds also have Dominican origin.

Machel Ross, a theatre director and costume designer is Dominican American.

=== Education ===
For Dominican Americans, there is a disparity between men and women in terms of access and ability to complete education.

=== Government and politics ===
Also increasing is the Dominican American profile in government and politics. Milestones along the way have been marked, among others, by Guillermo Linares and Kay Palacios, the first Dominican Americans elected in the United States, as former New York City Council Member and former Englewood Cliffs, New Jersey city council respectively; Marcos Devers, the first Dominican American mayor in the U.S., who was appointed as Acting Mayor of Lawrence, Massachusetts; Passaic, New Jersey mayor Dr. Alex D. Blanco, the first Dominican American mayor ever elected in the United States; Robert Uribe became the first Afro-Latino mayor of Douglas, Arizona, serving from 2016 to 2020; the first person of Dominican descent elected anywhere in the U.S. was former New York assemblyman Arthur O. Eve, serving parts of Buffalo, New York from 1966 to 2002. The first Dominican American New York County Supreme Court Judge was Rolando T. Acosta; Camelia Valdes, the first Dominican American to become a head prosecutor or district attorney in U.S. history; Adriano Espaillat and Grace Diaz, respectively the first Dominican American person and the first Dominican American woman to be elected to a state legislature in the United States; Juan Pichardo, Rhode Island State Senator, the first Dominican American to be elected State Senator in the United States.

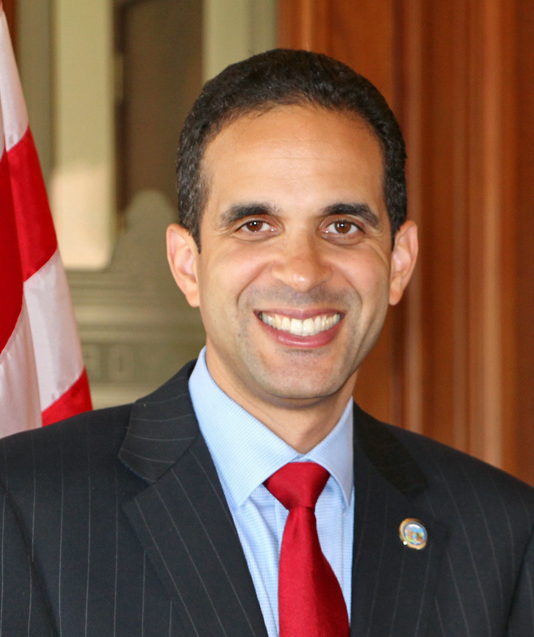
Angel Taveras, first Hispanic mayor of Providence, Rhode Island

President Barack Obama made his first major Dominican American appointment on March 13, 2009, when he nominated Thomas E. Perez to be Assistant Attorney General for Civil Rights and later United States Secretary of Labor. Perez was confirmed by the U.S. Senate on October 6, 2009. Angel Taveras, mayor of Providence, Rhode Island, is the first Latino mayor of the city, the third elected, and the fourth serving Dominican American mayor in the United States.

=== Medicine ===
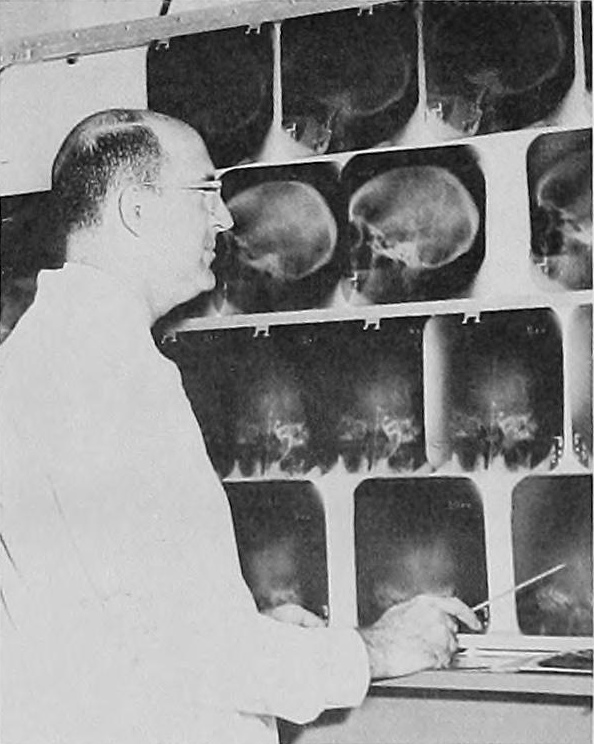
Juan Manuel Taveras Rodríguez.

Sarah Loguen Fraser (1850–1933) was the first female doctor in the Dominican Republic. She obtained her medical degree from the State University of New York Upstate Medical University in 1876. Fraser is believed to be only the fourth African-American woman to become a licensed physician at the time. When she died in 1933, the Dominican Republic declared a nine-day period of national mourning with flags flown at half-mast. A small park in Syracuse honors the Loguen family, while the Child Care Center at Upstate Medical University is named in Sarah's honor.

=== Music ===
Dominican music includes above all merengue and bachata. Bachata, as well as reggaeton, are very popular among many Dominican Americans. Along with Bachata and Reggaeton, Dominican American youth also enjoy Dembow and Latin trap. To a lesser degree, house, salsa, rock, hip hop and other musical genres are also commonly enjoyed.

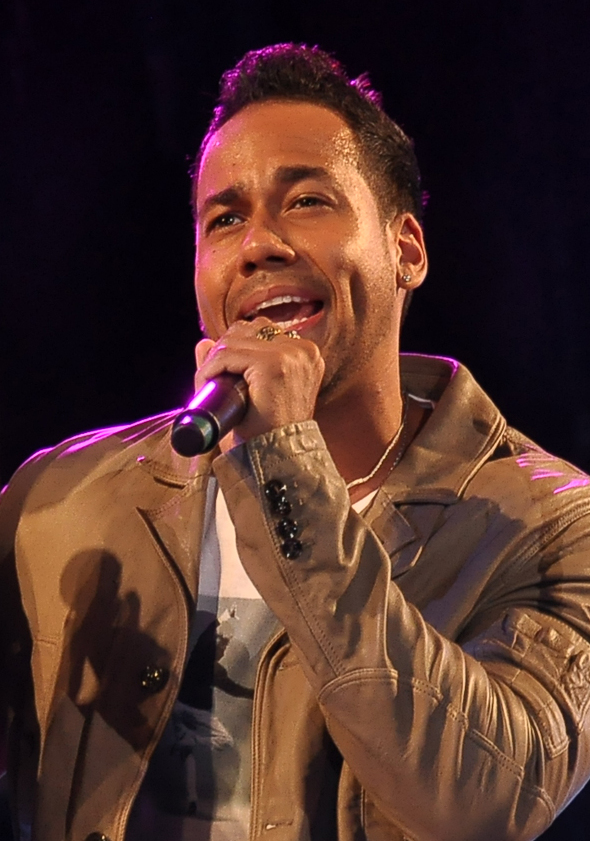
Romeo Santos

Some notables in the music industry include: bachata singers Romeo Santos, Prince Royce and Leslie Grace, Fuego Merengue singer, Ralph Mercado, founder of RMM Records and music producer; Johnny Pacheco, singer, godfather of New York salsa; Karina Pasian, singer and pianist; Kat DeLuna; Proyecto Uno, merengue hip-hop group; Anthony Romeo Santos, singer and songwriter; Rosanna Tavarez, Rita Indiana, singer and songwriter, singer and television host; Ivan Barias, music producer and songwriter; Richard Camacho, member of CNCO.

In September 2017, New York-based rapper Cardi B became the first person of partial Dominican descent to reach number one in the history of the US Billboard Hot 100 chart, since it was launched in 1958.

American rapper Ice Spice, whose drill song, "Munch (Feelin' U)", went viral in late 2022, tweeted that she is Dominican and African American. Respectively, fellow rapper Fabolous and R&B singer Brent Faiyaz are also of Afro-Dominican descent.

=== Sports ===
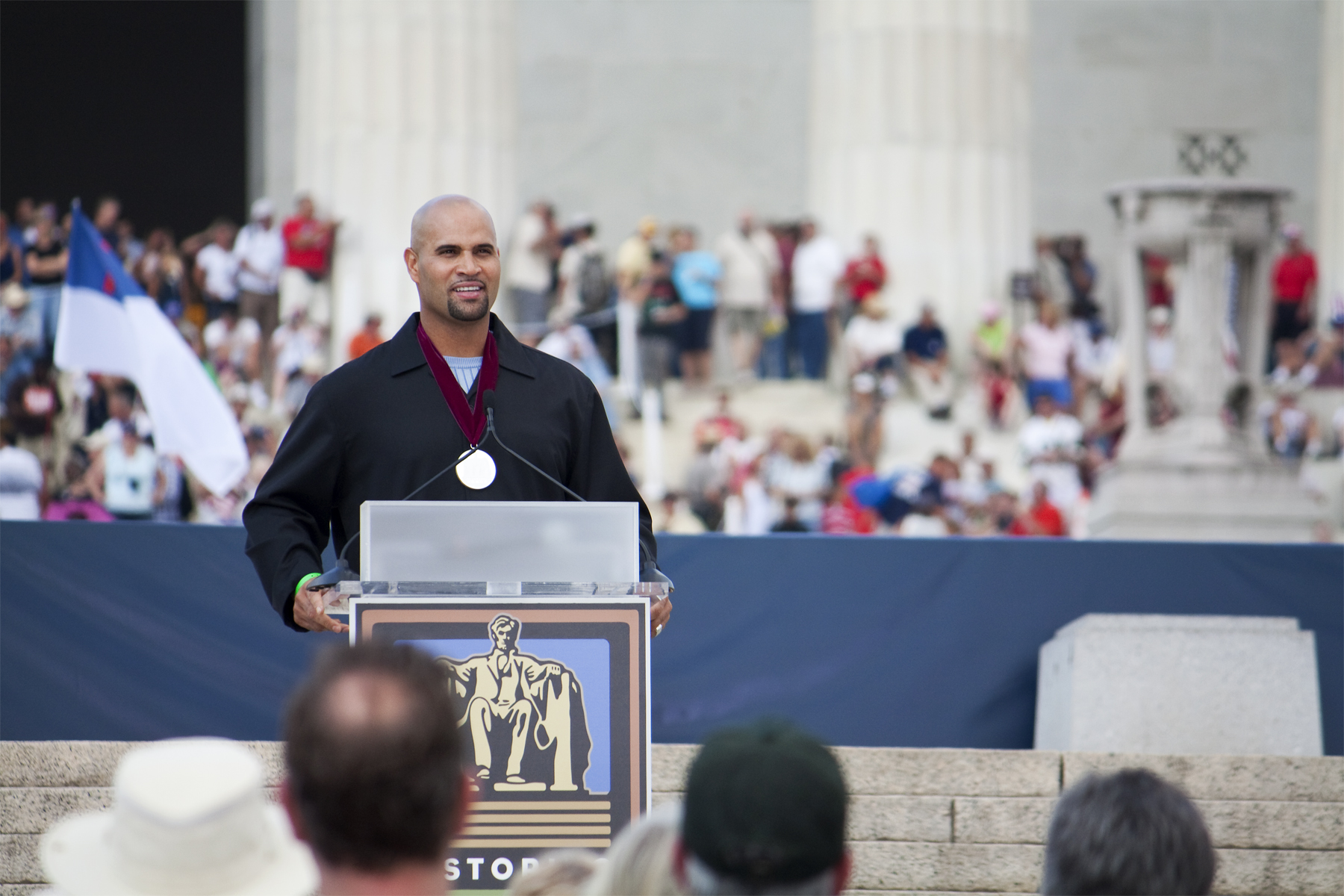
Dominican American baseball player Albert Pujols.

Dominican Americans have made great strides in the field of baseball, the community's favored sport. Alex Rodriguez, New York-born, is the most well-known Dominican American in this field. He was the highest-paid player in Major League Baseball (MLB), and one of the most famous athletes in the United States. The larger portion of MLB players of Dominican origin immigrated from the Dominican Republic, number in the hundreds, and count among them Robinson Canó, José Bautista, Rafael Soriano, David Ortiz, Albert Pujols, Edwin Encarnación, Hanley Ramírez, Manny Ramirez, Bartolo Colón and Hall of Fame members Juan Marichal, Vladimir Guerrero and Pedro Martínez.

Some of them, including Manny (2004), Pujols (2007), Ortiz (2008), Canó (2012), Colón (2014), Hanley (2019), and Carlos Santana (2019) have obtained U.S. citizenship. Dominican natives Felipe Alou and Tony Peña were managers and Omar Minaya is a general manager in (MLB). Basketball has seen the likes of Felipe López, Francisco Garcia and the father-son pair of Tito and Al Horford, all originally from the Dominican Republic, as well as Charlie Villanueva and 2015 NBA draft top pick Karl-Anthony Towns from the New York area. In the National Football League (NFL) there are Luis Castillo, Tutan Reyes and Dante Rosario.

Baseball is a lifestyle among many in the Dominican community, and most Dominican American MLB fans are split between the New York Yankees and the Boston Red Sox. Basketball is also a popular sport among Dominicans.

=== Other ===
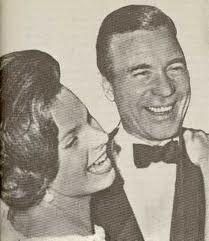
Porfirio Rubirosa, diplomatic and socialite who inspired the James Bond film character.

Among other notables of full or partial Dominican origins are Nancy Alvarez, sexologist and talk show host in Spanish-language media; Susie Castillo, Miss USA 2003; Mary Joe Fernández, a tennis player and television commentator; CNN columnist Geovanny Vicente, a community leader and political strategist in Washington, D.C.; Providencia Paredes, an assistant and confidante to Jacqueline Kennedy Onassis; and Ilka Tanya Payan, an AIDS/HIV activist, actress and attorney.

== See also ==
- Dominican people
- Dominican Republic
- Demographics of the Dominican Republic
- Culture of the Dominican Republic
- Mixed Dominicans
- White Dominicans
- Dominican Day Parade
- Dominicans in New York City
- Dominican immigration to Puerto Rico
- Hispanic Americans
- Latin American Canadians
- Dominicans in Spain
- Stateside Puerto Ricans
- Cuban Americans
- Haitian Americans
- West Indian Americans
- Spanish Caribbean
- Dominican Republic–United States relations
