= Rebellion of the Pilots =

Date	19 November 1961
Location	Dominican Republic
Result	Decisive rebel victory Trujillo family forced to flee the country

Belligerents
Elements of the Armed Forces still loyal to Trujillo	Dominican Air Force

Commanders and leaders
(Dominican Republic) Ramfis Trujillo	Manuel Durán Guzmán; Raymundo Polanco Alegría; Nelton González Pomares; Pedro Rafael Rodríguez Echavarría

The Rebellion of the Pilots was a military uprising carried out by six members of the Dominican Military Aviation (today the Dominican Air Force) on November 19, 1961, that put a definitive end to the rule of 31 years of the Trujillo dictatorship by forcing the exile of the Trujillo family from the country. It prevented Ramfis Trujillo, José Arismendy Trujillo and Héctor Bienvenido Trujillo Molina from returning to power and restoring the regime led by their brother Rafael Trujillo.

The timely rebellion marked the end of one of the bloodiest dictatorships of the twentieth century and the beginning of the transition to democracy in the Dominican Republic, preventing the elimination of the political class that opposed the Trujillo regime.

== Background ==
On the night of May 30, 1961, Juan Tomás Díaz, his brother Modesto Díaz, Antonio de la Maza, Antonio Imbert Barrera, Salvador Estrella Sadhalá, Amado García Guerrero, Huáscar Tejeda, Pedro Livio Cedeño, Luis Amiama Tio, Luis Manuel Cáceres Michel and Roberto Pastoriza Neret assassinated dictator Rafael Leónidas Trujillo as part of a plot supported by the CIA.

Even though the regime was severely weakened due to Trujillo's assassination, for the most part it remained alive, thanks to the strong hand of Ramfis Trujillo (who was in Paris by the time his father was killed, but was swift in returning home, taking power and launching a manhunt for the assassins) and the support of the army. Within the next 5 months, Ramfis launched strong reprisals against those suspected of killing his father, neutralizing 3 of the 11 conspirators within 10 days after his father's death and imprisoning the Secretary of the Armed forces, General José René Román 'Pupo' and killing him 4 months later. But there was one major obstacle in his journey to revive the regime to its full extent, and that was President Joaquín Balaguer, who was a close friend of the dead dictator, but once he was killed, he conceded some civil liberties, relaxed the strong censorship of the press and allowed the return of many political exiles, mostly against the will of Ramfis.

On the night of November 18th, Ramfis, his uncles, and the high command of the Armed Forces met at the San Isidro Air Base. There they laid out a plan to launch a coup d'état against President Balaguer (and possibly kill him), take control of the country, and finish off the National Civic Union and the Cuban-backed 14 of June Movement by conducting massacres against their leaders and members. The plan was codenamed Operación Luz Verde.

== Rebellion ==
On the morning of November 19, 1961, the artillery and the tank squadrons of the San Isidro Air Base were bombed, as well as other military installations that remained loyal to Trujillo across the country, such as the Mao and Puerto Plata fortresses. These attacks, well organized and well coordinated, were successful, and any resistance to the insurrection was swiftly neutralized.

The Rebellion of the Pilots was devised and executed by Lieutenant Colonels Manuel Durán Guzmán, ideologue of the plot, Raymundo Polanco Alegría, commander of the Ramfis Hunting Squadron, and Nelton González Pomares. It was led by General Pedro Rodríguez Echavarria, at that time commander of the Santiago air base and the superior officers Pedro Santiago Rodríguez Echavarría and Federico Fernández Smester.

== Aftermath ==
The rebellion prevented the execution of Operación Luz Verde and forced the Trujillo family to flee into exile within the next 3 days to Guadeloupe, and later France, never to return to the Dominican Republic again. Although now Balaguer was free from his puppet masters, his position was still delicate and precarious, as unrest against him, especially in the military, was rising, and finally, on January 16, 1962, Balaguer was forced to resign in what was a soft coup after 3 days of intense protests and General Echavarría turning on him and seizing power.

== Members of the plot ==
Manuel Durán Guzmán was born on September 28, 1924, in Villa Riva. He studied at the Padre Fantino Jesuit seminary in Santo Cerro as a young man, then ventured into a military career in 1945. He was the ideological leader and originator of the conspiracy. His plan was to carry it out in the months following Rafael Trujillo's death but he could not do so due to the high risk in those early days of being denounced and arrested.

Raymundo Polanco Alegría was Durán Guzmán's first contact. A member of Durán Guzmán's graduating class in 1948, Polanco-Alegría, of Almerian descent, was commander of the Ramfis Hunt Squadron and had under his command sixty aircraft of all types during the golden age of the Dominican Military Aviation. He was one of the great aces of the Dominican Military Aviation. After the November 19 plot, he retired from military aviation and was designated as a military attaché in Europe.

Nelton González Pomares was another of Durán Guzmán's first contacts. He was the commander of the Hunting and Bombing Group. After the uprising, he was appointed as a military attache to Washington and later was Director of Dominicana de Aviacion.

Pedro Rafael Rodríguez Echavarría, brigadier general and commander of the Santiago Air Base, was convinced by Durán Guzmán to lead the plot due to the quality of his leadership, his prestige and his good relationships with other political and military leaders. He supported Balaguer in the creation of the first State Council. It is said that at the request of President John F. Kennedy, he was appointed on November 22 Secretary of State of the Armed Forces and his brother Pedro Santiago Rodríguez Echavarría as Chief of Staff of the Dominican Air Force.
