= The Feast of the Goat (film) =

- Directed by: Luis Llosa
- Screenplay by: Luis Llosa; Augusto Cabada; Zachary Sklar
- Based on: The Feast of the Goat by Mario Vargas Llosa
- Produced by: Andrés Vicente Gómez
- Starring: Tomas Milian; Isabella Rossellini; Paul Freeman; Juan Diego Botto; Stephanie Leonidas
- Cinematography: Javier Salmones
- Edited by: Alejandro Lázaro
- Music by: José Antonio Molina
- Release date: 23 September 2005 (Santo Domingo)
- Running time: 132 minutes
- Countries: Dominican Republic; Spain; United Kingdom
- Language: English
- Budget: RD$8,000,000

The Feast of the Goat (Spanish: La fiesta del chivo) is a 2005 Dominican-Spanish-British drama film directed by Luis Llosa and starring Tomas Milian, Isabella Rossellini, Paul Freeman, Juan Diego Botto and Stephanie Leonidas. It is based on Mario Vargas Llosa's 2000 novel of the same name.

== Plot ==
Urania Cabral returns to Santo Domingo, after several years, and remembers her and her family's relationship to Rafael Leonidas Trujillo, the Dominican dictator, as well as the events surrounding his assassination.

== Cast ==
- Tomas Milian as Rafael Leonidas Trujillo
- Isabella Rossellini as Urania
- Paul Freeman as Agustín Cabral
- Juan Diego Botto as Amadito García Guerrero
- Stephanie Leonidas as Uranita
- Shawn Elliott as Johnny Abbes García
- Murphy Guyer as Turk
- Richard Bekins as Manuel Alfonso
- Jordan Lage as Gral. Pupo Román
- Carlos Miranda as Antonio Imbert Barrera
- Steven Bauer as Juan José Viñas
- David Zayas as Antonio de la Maza
- Eileen Atkins as Aunt Adelina
- Ricardo Álamo as Ramfis Trujillo
- Stephen C. Bradbury as American Senator
- Gary Piquer as Galindez

== Production ==
Filming began in Santo Domingo in the first weeks of October 2004. After several weeks of filming, the production continued in Spain. Several locations used for filming were located in La Romana and Jarabacoa (north of Capital). The executive in charge of production was the Spaniard Andrés Vicente Gómez, chairman of Lola Films. The budget was RD$8,000,000.

The movie was released in Madrid on February 24, 2006, but first had a screening in the Berlin International Film Festival. It was released in Peru on 30 March 2006.

== Reception ==
Writing for Variety Magazine, Jonathan Holland described the film as "rushed, but thoroughly enjoyable" and executed with "clinical skill". Holland complained that the film lacked the nuance and strong characterization of Vargas Llosa's novel.
