= Amado García Guerrero =

Soldier in Dominican Republic

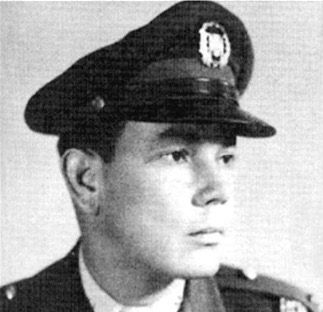
Amado García Guerrero

Amado García Guerrero (June 2, 1931 – June 2, 1961) was one of the conspirators against, and killers of, Dominican dictator Rafael Leónidas Trujillo.

== Assassination of Rafael Trujillo ==
He was a soldier in the Dominican Republic. A member of the Military Aides-de-Camp of Rafael Leonidas Trujillo, he was the person who informed the other conspirators that Trujillo would later leave that night for San Cristóbal. He also was one of the assassins in the ambush on the highway. The story of the revolutionaries and their personal motivations for participating in the assassination of Trujillo, serves to writers as Mario Vargas Llosa, as examples of the experiences with atrocities of the general population suffered during the Trujillo's regime.

The reasons for Amado García's actions against Trujillo were:

1. Trujillo officially denied García permission to marry the girl he loved, Luisa, because she happened to be sister of René Gil a "dangerous communist rebel" (who searched for refuge in a foreign embassy in Santo Domingo).
2. Military police forced García to kill a young prisoner, who he later discovered was the brother of his fiancée.

As is described by Vargas Llosa in La Fiesta del Chivo, Amado García Guerrero was a soldier who, due to a capricious test of his loyalty, executed a man with the bandaged eyes. Soon, he was told that the man he just executed was the brother of his ex-fiancée. Later, Salvador Sadhalá tried to console him by saying, "It's a lie, Amadito... It could be any other [man]. He deceived you... Forget about what was said to you. Forget about what you did."

According to Bernard Diederich, the reason for Trujillo's refusal of García's marriage request was that his fiancé's brother had looked for asylum in a foreign embassy in the capital. Later, Amadito received the order to shoot (some say to merely watch the execution of) a victim seated in the jail of the SIM. García followed orders, hoping that it would save himself and the man further torture. Later, García recounted his troubles to Estrella Sadhalá and swore to assassinate Trujillo (Diederich 74). Following this oath, Amado, youngest of the conspirators, joined his new comrades in a plan to kill Trujillo.

On May 30, 1961, the men regrouped and awaited Trujillo on the side of a highway, where they knew from inside intelligence that the dictator would be passing by on his way to visit his family and he wouldn't have many security surrounding him. The men were: Modesto Díaz Quezada, Luis Manuel Cáceres Michel, Juan Tomás Diaz, Manuel de Ovín Filpo (Spaniard immigrant and agronomist technician), Salvador Estrella Sadhalá (a.k.a. "El Turco"), Huáscar Antonio Tejeda Pimentel, Luis Amiama Tió, Antonio Imbert Barrera, Antonio de la Maza, Roberto Pastoriza Neret, Pedro Livio Cedeño Herrera, and Amado García Guerrero.

There, on San Cristóbal Highway in Santo Domingo, the men ambushed Trujillo's car and assassinated the dictator.

On June 2, agents of the Servicio de Inteligencia Militar (SIM; the secret police) entered house #59 of Avenue San Martín, (a residence owned by García's relatives) and found Lieutenant Amado García Guerrero in hiding, where he was discovered by a female supporter of Trujillo. After resisting the attacks of the SIM agents, García was mortally wounded and died at the age of 30.

== Memorials ==
A bust of his likeness is memorialized in Avenida San Martín 59 Villa Consuelo within Santo Domingo unveiled on his birthday, June 2 where he died.
