= Jesús Galíndez =

Spanish politician (1915–1956)

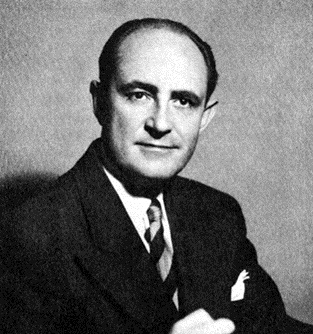
- Born: Jesús (de) Galíndez Suárez; October 12, 1915; Madrid or Amurrio, Spain
- Disappeared: March 12, 1956 (aged 40); New York City, U.S.
- Status: Presumed dead
- Occupations: Politician, writer, law professor
- Known for: Opposition to Francisco Franco and Rafael Trujillo

Academic work
- Discipline: Law
- Institutions: Columbia University

Jesús (de) Galíndez Suárez (October 12, 1915 – disappeared March 12, 1956) was a Basque Spanish politician, writer and Columbia University international law professor of Basque nationalist ideology who disappeared in New York City. He was allegedly kidnapped and murdered by intelligence operatives of the Servicio de Inteligencia Militar, based on a direct order from Rafael Trujillo, the caudillo of the Dominican Republic.

== Early life ==
Galíndez was born in Madrid or Amurrio, Alava, and, as a Basque Nationalist Party member, took part on the Republican side in the Spanish Civil War. In 1939 he fled to Ciudad Trujillo, now Santo Domingo, where he lectured and represented the Basque government as a delegate. He started to investigate Trujillo and his government, encountered problems, and fled again, moving to New York City in 1946. Through the network he met with Ibero-American Poets, the Writers Guild, the International League for the Rights of Man, and the Inter-American Association for Democracy and Freedom. At Columbia University, he lectured on international law and completed his doctoral thesis on Trujillo and his regime. Galíndez allegedly became an informant for the FBI.

== Disappearance ==
Galíndez was last seen at 10 PM on March 12, 1956, as he entered the subway station at 57th Street and Eighth Avenue in Manhattan. TIME magazine indicated that he disappeared near a subway station at 116th Street and Broadway.

It was well known that Galíndez feared that Dominican agents might kill him. On the night of his disappearance, two Dominican ships were in New York; one put out that night and returned after 5 hours, the other leaving later. However, investigations initially went nowhere. His body was never found, but the unraveling of the Murphy disappearance shed further light on his case.

== Murphy case ==
Gerald Lester Murphy was an American airline pilot for the Dominican airline, CDA. On December 4, 1956, his car was found abandoned near Ciudad Trujillo, without a trace of him.

Under pressure from relatives, their Congressional representatives, and the US State Department, the Dominican government became involved. It was suggested that Octavio de la Maza, also a pilot with CDA, and Murphy had a brawl, and Murphy fell from a cliff into the ocean. De la Maza was arrested and jailed, but refused to admit any involvement. On January 7, 1957, he was found hanging in his cell with a suicide note and an admission of involvement. However, circumstances of his "suicide" implied that it was staged and his note was declared a forgery by the FBI.

The trial in the US of John J. Frank in November 1956 as an unregistered agent for the Dominican government provided further insights into the Galíndez–Murphy connection. He stated that Galíndez had been under Dominican supervision for some time, and it was feared that he was writing a critical volume about Trujillo and his family. Agents offered US$25,000 (equivalent to $296,053 in 2025) to buy the manuscript, but Galíndez refused. Thus, Trujillo decided that Galíndez had to be killed.

A plan was hatched to use an American pilot, Murphy, who rented a Beech aircraft, equipped it for long-distance flight and landed on March 12 in Amityville. That night, an ambulance arrived and a "patient" was moved on the airplane. The plane, piloted by Murphy, flew to West Palm Beach to refuel. Then, Murphy flew to the Dominican Republic carrying the "patient," who subsequently disappeared. Murphy initially had plenty of money but may have talked too much and disappeared. It is alleged that Galíndez was the "patient."

== Consequences ==
De la Maza's death created friction between Trujillo and his son Ramfis who had been a close friend to de la Maza. In the US, Trujillo hired Sydney S. Baron and Co. to counteract the negative publicity and reactions that the case had evoked. Baron hired Morris Ernst to investigate the Galíndez disappearance. With the help of the Dominican government, they produced a report in May 1958 that whitewashed the Dominican government of any involvement. Nevertheless, Crassweller sees the Galíndez case as one factor in the deteriorating relationship between the United States and Trujillo.

The elder brother of Octavio de la Maza, Antonio de la Maza, who was allegedly convinced of the regime's guilt in his brother's death, became one of the assassins of Trujillo in 1961.

The CUNY Dominican Studies Institute published an investigation in 2018 titled Professor Galíndez: Disappearing from Earth: Governments, Complicity, and How a Kidnapping in the Midst of American Democracy Went Unsolved.

== Literature and movies ==
Galíndez's book, La era de Trujillo: un estudio casuístico de dictadura hispanoamericana, was published in Buenos Aires and Santiago de Chile in 1956, a few months after his disappearance. Translations were later published in France and in the United States.

The Galíndez case inspired the 1961 novel, Ciudad Trujillo, by Andrzej Wydrzyński, a Polish novelist.

Julia Alvarez references the disappearance of Galíndez in her 1994 novel In the Time of the Butterflies during a section from María Teresa Mirabal's perspective.

The Galíndez case also inspired the 1991 novel Galíndez by Manuel Vázquez Montalbán, which led to the 2003 movie El misterio Galíndez ("The Galíndez File") with Eduard Fernández playing his role.

In the 2000 novel, The Feast of the Goat, Nobel laureate Mario Vargas Llosa writes at length about Galíndez and his disappearance.

In 2002 Ana Diez directed the documentary, Galíndez, about the affair.

The 2003 film, El misterio Galíndez (The Galíndez File) directors, Gerardo Herrero and Leigh Romero (Barcelona: Magna Films, 2003).

Junot Díaz briefly relates the Galíndez case in a footnote to his 2007 novel The Brief Wondrous Life of Oscar Wao.

== See also ==
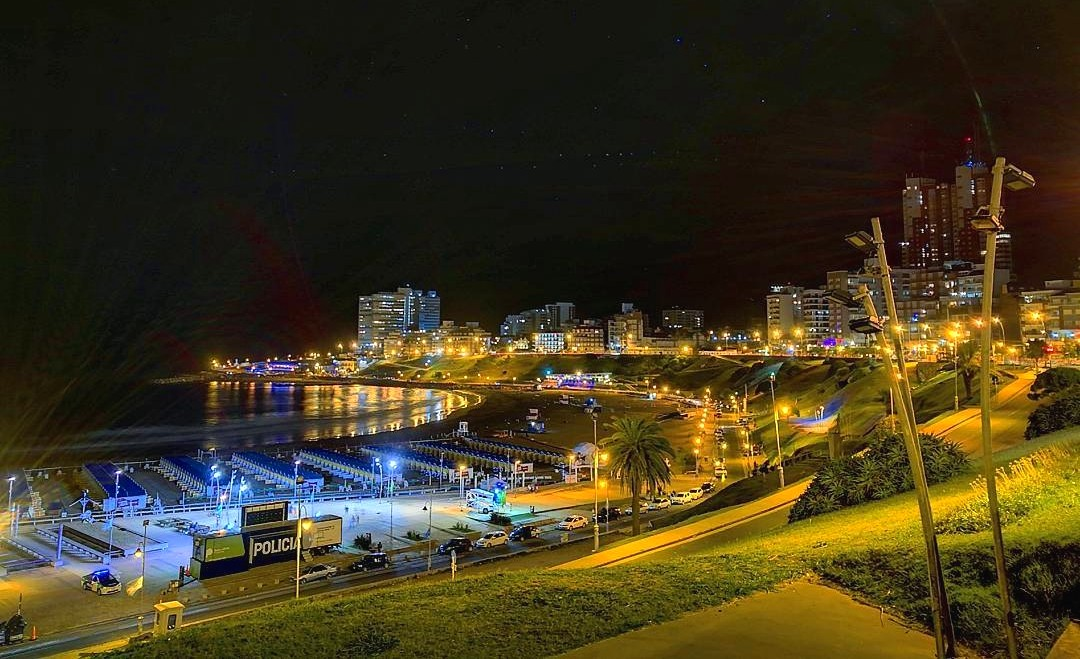
Paseo Jesús de Galíndez in Mar del Plata, Argentina

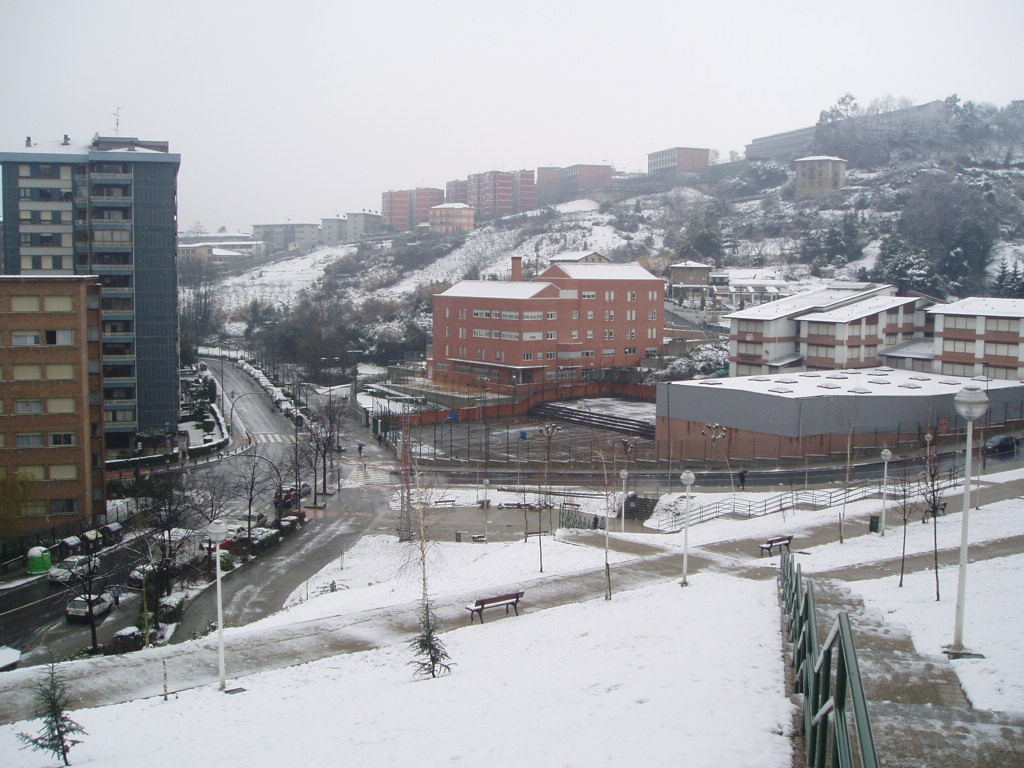
Jesús de Galíndez avenue in Bilbao, Spain

- List of people who disappeared
