= Antonio Imbert Barrera =

Dominican army general (1920–2016)

Major General Antonio Imbert Barrera

President of the Dominican Republic (parallel to the Constitutionalist Government)
- In office May 7, 1965 – August 30, 1965
- Vice President: None
- Preceded by: Pedro Bartolomé Benoit
- Succeeded by: Héctor García-Godoy

Minister of Defense of the Dominican Republic
- In office October 8, 1986 – June 17, 1988
- President: Joaquín Balaguer
- Preceded by: Víctor M. Barjan Muffdi
- Succeeded by: Elías Wessin y Wessin

Personal details
- Born: December 3, 1920 San Felipe de Puerto Plata, Dominican Republic
- Died: May 31, 2016 (aged 95) Santo Domingo, Dominican Republic
- Spouses: Giralda Busto Sánchez; Guarina Mercedes Tessón Hurtado; María Sánchez
- Relations: Carmen Imbert Brugal (niece) Segundo Imbert (grandfather) José María Imbert (great-grandfather)
- Children: 4
- Parents: Segundo Manuel Imbert Mesnier (father); María del Consuelo Barrera Steinkopf (mother)
- Profession: Army Major General

Major General Antonio Cosme Imbert Barrera (December 3, 1920 – May 31, 2016) was a Dominican military officer and the 44th President of the Dominican Republic from May to August 1965.

Imbert, who plotted to assassinate dictator Rafael Trujillo in 1961, was one of the two rival rulers in the Dominican Republic from May 7, 1965, until August 30, 1965, amid the Dominican Civil War. He had succeeded General Pedro B. Benoit van der Horst who ruled for less than a week. After the civil war ended, both General Imbert and his rival Colonel Francisco Caamaño resigned, and Héctor García-Godoy, a civilian, was sworn as interim president.

According to Imbert, he fired the fatal shot at Trujillo.

== Early life ==
Imbert was born into a prominent family of military tradition: his father, Brigadier General Segundo Manuel Imbert Mesnier had a leading role in the northern region of the Dominican Republic; Brigadier General Segundo Francisco Imbert, Imbert Barrera's grandfather, was Vice-President of the Dominican Republic and candidate for president, and fought in the Dominican Restoration War; meanwhile his great-grandfather, Major General José María Imbert, who was a French migrant, achieved important victories against Haiti in the Dominican War of Independence.

Imbert's first significant position was as governor of Puerto Plata in 1940. He was removed from the post by then president Rafael Trujillo for sending him a telegram informing upon the names of the survivors of the failed Luperón invasion. This caused, in a personal manner, the beginning of the assassination plan against Trujillo.

His brother Segundo, an army official too, was imprisoned in 1956 by Trujillo's regime. Segundo was convicted for murder; implicated in the murder of Domingo Marión in 1943.

== Assassination of Trujillo ==
On May 30, 1961, Trujillo was shot dead when his car was ambushed on a road outside the Dominican capital. Imbert, the driver of the ambushing vehicle, was accompanied by Antonio de la Maza, Salvador Estrella Sadhalá and Amado García Guerrero - the active participants who carried out the plot. Most of those involved in the assassination plot were subsequently captured and executed, with the exception of Imbert and Luis Amiama Tió. Imbert went into hiding until December 2.

After Joaquín Balaguer, Trujillo's figurehead president, was overthrown in 1962 and the Trujillo family was ousted, Imbert was declared a "National Hero" and was promoted to Major General with the special grant of it being ad vitam or lifelong. In the Civil War in the Dominican Republic of 1965 he led one of the factions in the struggle which faced the constitutionalist government led by Colonel Francisco Caamaño, who tried to bring back Juan Bosch to the country's presidency. Imbert's faction, called the Government of National Reconstruction was endorsed by the U.S. troops inspectors, in addition, he was one of the collaborators with the Americans, finally signing a peace act that put an end to the April war.

== Later life ==
On March 21, 1967, he was shot in Santo Domingo while traveling with Marino García, in an attempted assassination made by the late dictator Trujillo's supporters. He survived by driving himself to a medical clinic. On February 15, 1970, the Dominicana de Aviación flight wherein his sister Aída Imbert Barrera, his wife Guarina Tessón Hurtado, and his daughter, sportswoman Leslie Imbert Tessón, were travelling, crashed into the Caribbean Sea.

He was Minister of Defense of the Dominican Republic from 1986 to 1988 (period in which he held the rank of Lieutenant General as incumbent of Defense); earlier that decade, his second-cousin Mario Imbert McGregor was also Minister of Defense. In 1989 he was assigned chairman of the board of directors of Rosario Dominicana. In September 2013, the Constitutionalist Soldiers of 25 April 1965 Foundation asked the National Congress of the Dominican Republic to explore the possibility of stripping Imbert his status of national hero as it considered that he went against constitutional precepts when he supported the coup against Bosch and the U.S. occupation of the country, among other accusations.

Imbert died on May 31, 2016, the day following the fifty-fifth anniversary of Trujillo's assassination, at the age of 95. Dominican President Danilo Medina declared three days of mourning. His niece, Carmen Imbert Brugal, said that cause of his death was complications of pneumonia.

=== Marriages and family ===
He married Guarina Tessón Hurtado on September 10, 1939, in Puerto Plata. They had three children:

- Antonio Segundo Imbert Tessón (born June 9, 1940), army general. He married Victoria Isabel Pellerano Amiama (niece of Luis Amiama Tió) and had 3 children.
- Leslie Imbert Tessón (1949–February 15, 1970), sportswoman. Died childless in an aircraft accident.
- Oscar José Antonio Imbert Tessón (born December 30, 1953), architect. He designed the Punta Cana International Airport. He married Margarita Pou Guerra and had 1 child and divorced. He remarried to Solange Juliette Martín-Caro Lithgow, but later divorced with no children from this marriage.

He had a liaison with María Sánchez, from Sosúa, and begat Manuel Antonio Imbert Sánchez (born April 1, 1939), police officer and former diplomat; Imbert Sánchez is a colonel and is married (to Josefina López Henríquez) with 4 children and he is since 2012 the chief of the Special Police Corps for State Banks, he also was consul to the United States in Charlotte Amalie, U.S. Virgin Islands in the 1980s and the 1990s.

His wife died in 1970 in an aircraft accident. After widowing Imbert Barrera remarried to Giralda Busto Sánchez, but had no children from this marriage.

== Cultural references ==
Antonio Imbert is a character of Mario Vargas Llosa's novel The Feast of the Goat. In the film adaptation, he was played by Carlos Miranda.

== Ancestry ==
Family tree of Antonio Imbert Barrera

16. Simon Imbert; Le Plessis-Grammoire, Kingdom of France
8. José María Bartolomé Imbert Duplessis (1798–1847); Le Plessis-Grammoire, France
17. Marie Anne du Plessis; Le Plessis-Grammoire, Kingdom of France
4. Segundo Francisco Imbert del Monte (1837–1905); Moca, Dominican Republic
18. Francisco del Monte
9. María Francisca del Monte Sánchez (1807–1876); Moca, French Santo Domingo
19. María Sánchez
2. Segundo Manuel Imbert Mesnier (1876–1921); Puerto Plata, Dominican Republic
10. Antonio Mesnier Antoinet (né Antoin Mesnier); France
5. Manuela Mesnier Román (1842–1893); Puerto Plata, Cibao Department, Haitian Santo Domingo
11. Felipa Román
1. Antonio Cosme Imbert Barrera (1920–2016); Puerto Plata, Dominican Republic
12. (Galicia (Spain)) Modesto de la Barrera Luaces; Spain
6. (Galicia (Spain)) Antonio de la Barrera Pasarín (1844–1920); Spain
13. (Galicia (Spain)) Francisca Pasarín Ibáñez; Spain
3. María del Consuelo Barrera Steinkopf (1894–1980); Puerto Plata, Dominican Republic
28. Cristoph Ludwig Gottfried Steinkopf (1776–?); Stuttgart, Holy Roman Empire
14. Carlos Luis Geraldo Steinkopf Bauer (1830–1862); Kingdom of Württemberg
29. Adelaide Bauer; Holy Roman Empire
7. Adriana Isabel Steinkopf Jannaut (1858–1909); Puerto Plata, Dominican Republic
30. Juan Amado Jannaut (né Jean Aimé Jannaut; ca. 1805– ?); France
15. Luisa Cornelia Jannaut Arredondo
31. Gumercinda Arredondo (ca. 1813– ?)

Government offices
| Preceded by Pedro Bartolomé Benoit | President of the Dominican Republic; 1965 | Succeeded by Héctor García-Godoy |
| Preceded by not available | Governor of Puerto Plata; 1940–? | Succeeded by not available |
Military offices
| Preceded by Víctor M. Barjan Muffdi | Minister of Defense of the Dominican Republic; 1986–1988 | Succeeded by Elías Wessin y Wessin |
