= The Galíndez File =

- Theatrical release poster
- Spanish: El misterio Galíndez
- Directed by: Gerardo Herrero
- Screenplay by: Ángeles González-Sinde; Luis Marías
- Based on: Galíndez by Manuel Vázquez Montalbán
- Produced by: Gerardo Herrero; Javier López Blanco; Tedy Villalba
- Starring: Saffron Burrows; Harvey Keitel; Eduard Fernández; Guillermo Toledo
- Cinematography: Alfredo F. Mayo
- Edited by: Carmen Frías
- Music by: Patrick Doyle
- Production companies: DMVB Films; Ensueño Films; Greenpoint Films; Instituto Cubano de Artas e Industrias Cinematográficos; Storie S.r.l. Tornasol Films
- Release date: 8 September 2003 (Toronto)
- Running time: 124 minutes
- Countries: Spain; United Kingdom; Italy; Portugal; Cuba; France
- Languages: English; Spanish

The Galíndez File (Spanish: El misterio Galíndez, lit. 'The Galíndez Mystery') is a 2003 drama film directed by Gerardo Herrero and starring Saffron Burrows, Harvey Keitel, Eduard Fernández and Guillermo Toledo. It is based on Manuel Vázquez Montalbán's 1991 novel Galíndez.

== Cast ==
- Saffron Burrows as Muriel Colber
- Harvey Keitel as Edward Robards
- Eduard Fernández as Galíndez
- Guillermo Toledo as Ricardo
- Reynaldo Miravalles as Don Angelito
- John Furey as Norman Radcliffe
- Chete Lera as Diplomático
- Enrique Almirante as Trujillo
- Txema Blasco as Ricardo's Uncle

== Accolades ==
Year	Award	Category	Nominee(s)	Result	Ref.
2002	18th Goya Awards	Best Production Supervision	Josean Gómez	Nominated	
2002	18th Goya Awards	Best Cinematography	Alfredo Mayo	Nominated	

== See also ==
- List of Spanish films of 2003
