= Carles Buïgas =

Catalan architect, engineer, inventor and author

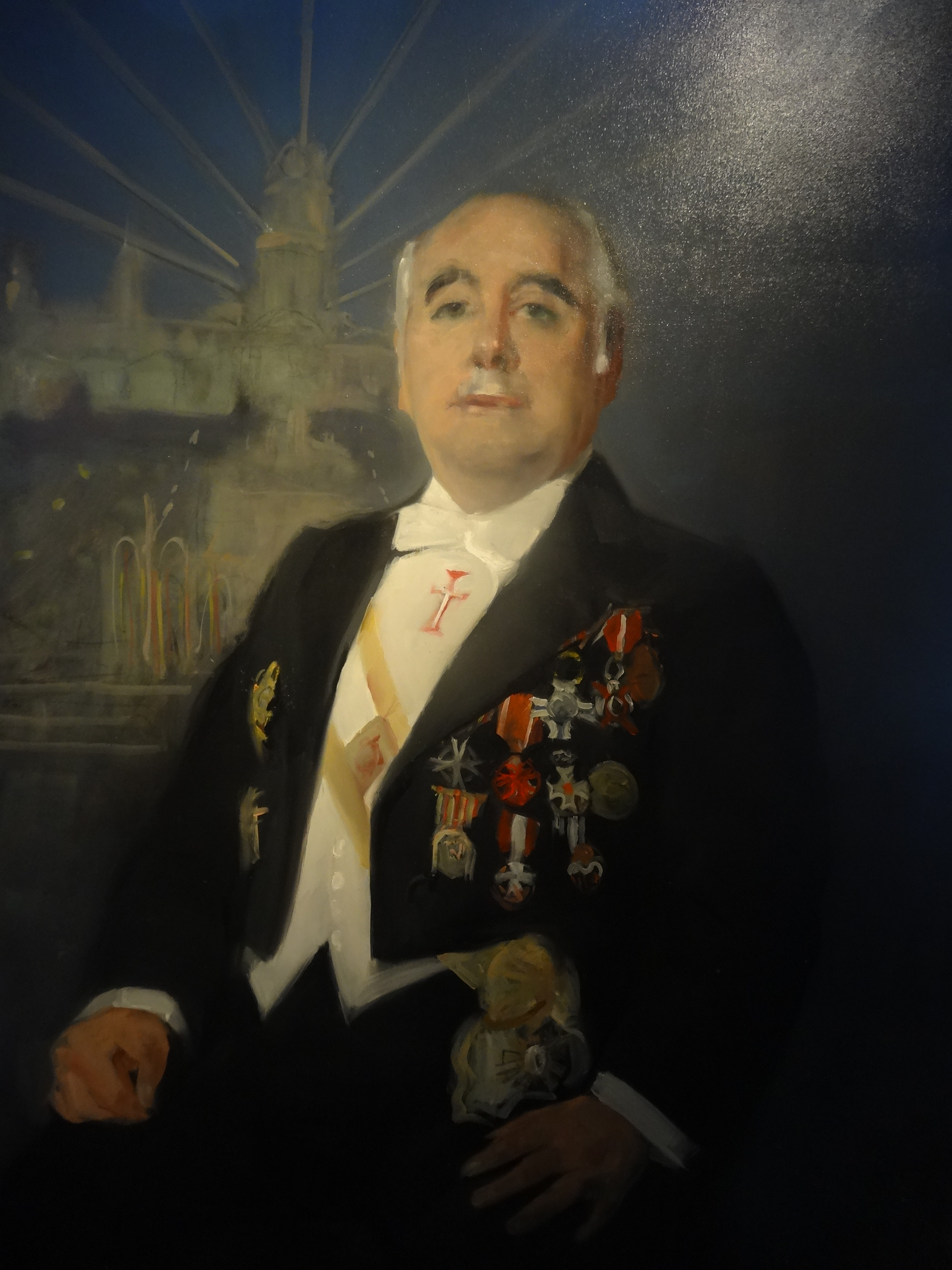
Portrait of Carles Buïgas

Carles Buïgas i Sans (18 January 1898 in Barcelona – 27 August 1979 in Cerdanyola del Vallès) was a Catalan architect, engineer, inventor and author.

== Biography ==
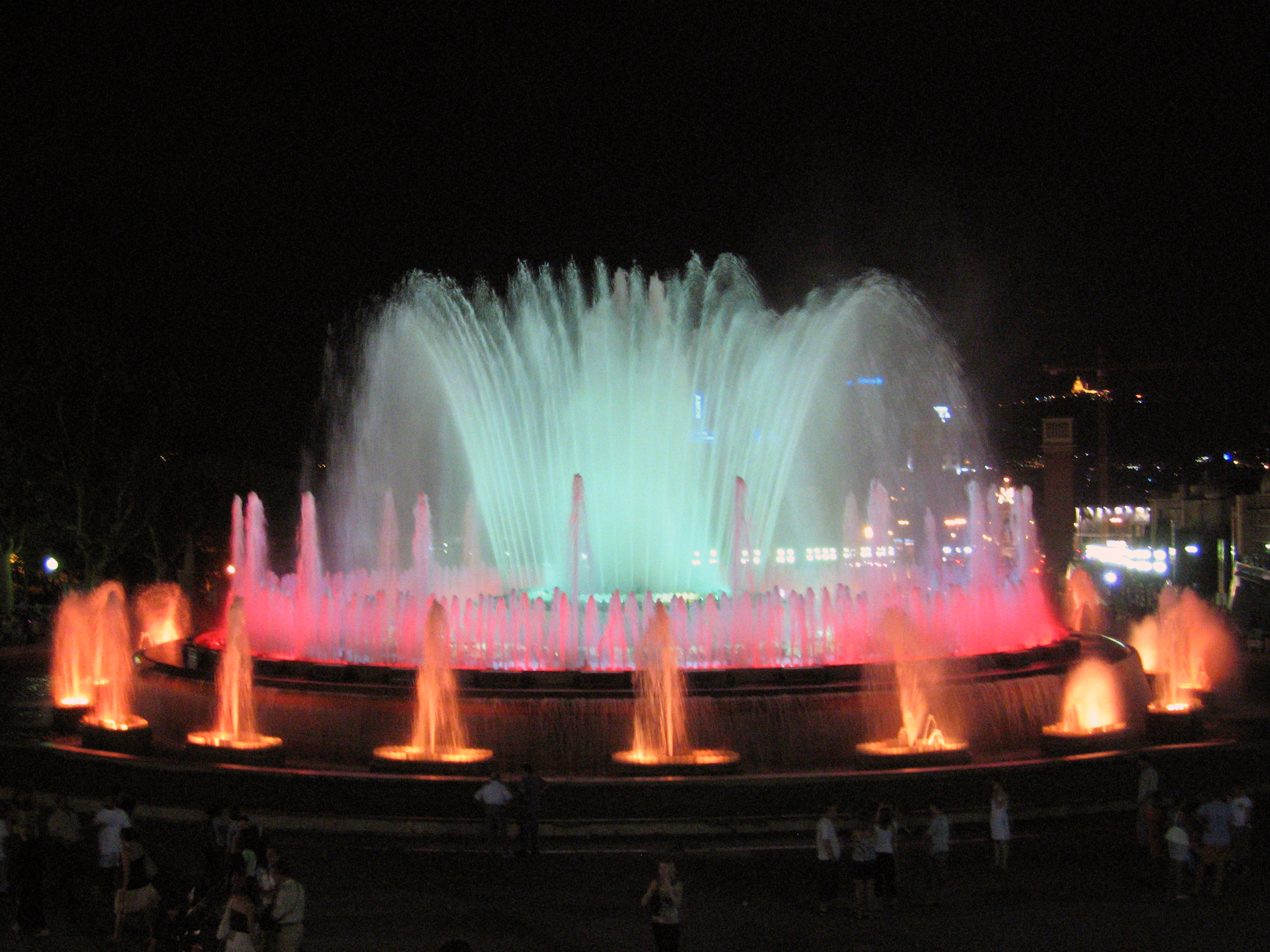
Magic Fountain, Montjuic

Buïgas was born into an educated family in Barcelona, the son of the architect Gaietà Buïgas. When he was seven, his family moved to Montevideo (Uruguay) but returned to Barcelona in 1910. In 1916, he entered the School of Industrial Engineers of Barcelona; he did not graduate, but he started to work as an assistant for the Exhibition of Electrical Industries of Barcelona. Later he continued to study at the École de Civil Génie in Paris.

In 1922 Buïgas designed his first project with illuminated water fountains for the Royal Palace of Pedralbes. Eugenio d'Ors described his work as a new style of art, the art of agualuz. His most famous work is the Magic Fountain of Montjuic, created for the International Exposition in Barcelona in 1929.

During the Spanish Civil War he settled in Paris, where he resided until 1942. During these years he gained an international reputation and he obtained commissions for projects for international expositions in Paris (1937), Liege (1939), Lisbon (1940), Rome (1953), and the Expo 58 at Brussels. In 1955, he designed the Teatro del Aqua y Luz for the international fair in Santo Domingo. As an inventor he designed a torpedo bomber seaplane in 1914, a device to recover sea sand for construction (1922), a one-person midget submarine (1932), a remote-controlled torpedo guided by ultrasound (1931–1933) and other devices.

Besides his architectural works, Buïgas wrote for magazines and published a number of books. He spent the last years of his life in Cerdanyola del Vallès, where he died and is buried.

== Works ==
1. Magic Fountain, Montjuïc, Barcelona
2. Teleférico del puerto, Barcelona
3. Fountain, Barcelona Airport, Barcelona
4. Illumination, Sagrada Família, Barcelona
5. Teatro del Aqua y Luz, Santo Domingo
6. Copy of magic fountain Montjuïc, Salou

== Books ==
- 1943 - Bajo las constelaciones.
- 1946 - El hombre entre enigmas y prodigios.
- 1960 - La Nave Luminosa.
- 1966 - El teatre integral amb escenari d'Aigua-Llum-Música.
- 1973 - Viajes interplanetarios y algo más.
- 1973 - Hechos, ideas y proyectos.
- 1975 - La extraordinaria aventura.
- 1975 - La gran revolución.
- 1976 - El día 41

== Sources ==
Caralt, David (2010). Agualuz: de pirotecnias a mundos flotantes : visiones de Carles Buïgas. Siruela. ISBN 9788498413922.
