= The South Seas (novel) =

1979 novel by Manuel Vázquez Montalbán

- Author: Manuel Vázquez Montalbán
- Original title: Los mares del Sur
- Language: Spanish
- Subject: Pepe Carvalho
- Genre: Detective novel
- Publication place: Spain
- Awards: 1979 Premio Planeta

The South Seas (Spanish: Los mares del Sur) is a 1979 Spanish novel written by Manuel Vázquez Montalbán. It was listed as one of the best hundred Spanish novels of the 20th century. In 1979 it received the Premio Planeta.
