= El estrangulador =

Book by Manuel Vázquez Montalbán

- Author: Manuel Vázquez Montalbán
- Language: Spanish
- Publisher: Grijalbo Mondadori
- Publication date: Oct 31, 1994
- Media type: Print

El estrangulador (English, The Strangler) is a 1994 novel by Manuel Vázquez Montalbán. The book was published on Oct 31, 1994 through Grijalbo Mondadori and focuses around a psychiatric patient that gives a potentially unreliable narration of his life. The book has received some praise for its content and won the Premio de la Crítica Española award in 1995.

== Synopsis ==
The book follows an unnamed narrator that is currently living in a psychiatric hospital. Through the book the narrator talks about the people he has killed and claims to be responsible for a series of murders in Boston. Vázquez Montalbán wrote the book in such a manner that the reader is left to decide whether or not the narrator has committed as many or any of the murders he claims to have performed.
