= El delantero centro fue asesinado al atardecer =

1989 novel by Manuel Vázquez Montalbán

Offside
- Author: Manuel Vázquez Montalbán
- Original title: El delantero centro fue asesinado al atardecer
- Translator: Ed Emery
- Language: Spanish
- Genre: Novel
- Publication date: 1989
- Publication place: Spain
- Preceded by: Murder in Prado del Rey and other sleazy short-stories
- Followed by: Carvalho's recipes

El delantero centro fue asesinado al atardecer (1989) (English, Offside) is a novel from Manuel Vázquez Montalbán.

== Plot ==
The private detective Pepe Carvalho is enquiring about a list of death threats arriving after that FC Barcelona purchases the football star Jack Mortimer.
