= José Rafael Molina Ureña =

Dominican Republic politician (1921–2000)

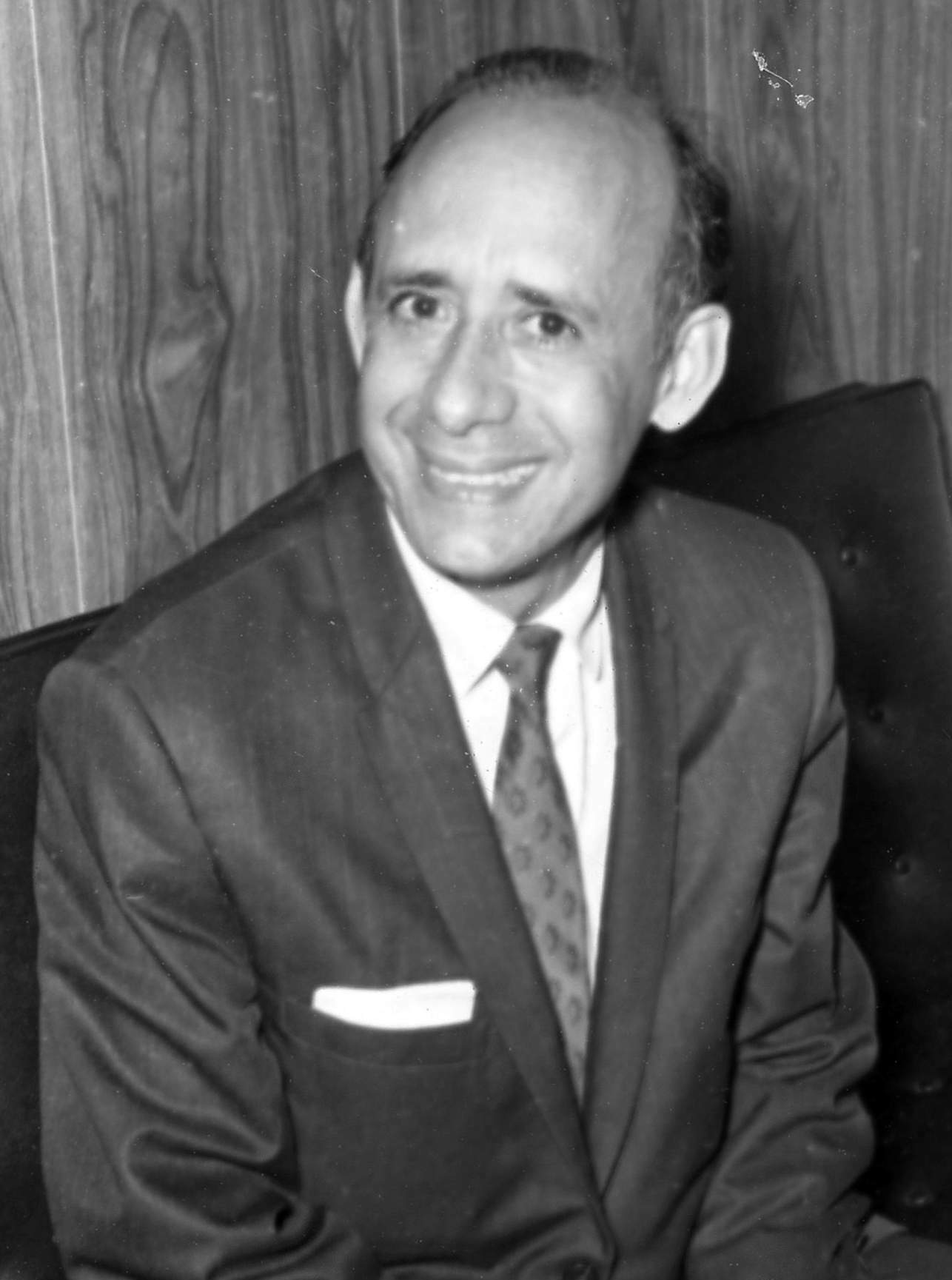

President of the Dominican Republic
- In office 25 April 1965 – 27 April 1965
- Preceded by: Donald Reid Cabral
- Succeeded by: Pedro Bartolomé Benoit

Personal details
- Born: 21 January 1921 Santo Domingo, Dominican Republic
- Died: 22 May 2000 (aged 79)
- Party: Dominican Revolutionary Party
- Spouse: Flor Pulgar

José Rafael Molina Ureña (April 30, 1921 – May 22, 2000) was a Dominican politician, who served as president of the Dominican Republic 25 April to 27 April 1965. After his brief stint as President, he was appointed Permanent Representative of the Dominican Republic to the United Nations from 1966 to 1968 and Ambassador to France from 1968 to 1971.

He was married to Flor Pulgar, who became the First Lady of the Dominican Republic during Molina's three-day presidency.
