= The Feast of the Goat =

2000 novel by Mario Vargas Llosa

- First edition (Spanish)
- Author: Mario Vargas Llosa
- Original title: La Fiesta del Chivo
- Translator: Edith Grossman
- Language: Spanish
- Genre: Historical novel Dictator novel
- Publisher: Alfaguara (Spanish); Picador (imprint) (English)
- Publication date: 2000
- Publication place: Peru
- English publication date: 2001
- Media type: Print (hardback & paperback)
- ISBN: 978-950-511-584-6 (Spanish); ISBN 0-374-15476-7 (English)

The Feast of the Goat (Spanish: La Fiesta del Chivo) is a 2000 novel by the Peruvian Nobel Prize in Literature laureate Mario Vargas Llosa. The book is set in the Dominican Republic and portrays the assassination of Dominican dictator Rafael Trujillo, and its aftermath, from two distinct standpoints a generation apart: during and immediately after the assassination itself, in May 1961; and thirty-five years later, in 1996. Throughout, there is also extensive reflection on the heyday of the dictatorship, in the 1950s, and its significance for the island and its inhabitants.

The novel follows three interwoven storylines. The first concerns a woman, Urania Cabral, who is back in the Dominican Republic, after a long absence, to visit her ailing father. Eventually, she ends up recalling incidents from her youth before recounting a long-held secret to her aunt and cousins. The second story line focuses on the last day in Trujillo's life from the moment he wakes up onwards, and shows us the regime's inner circle, to which Urania's father once belonged. The third strand depicts Trujillo's assassins, many of whom had previously been government loyalists, as they wait for his car late that night; after the assassination, this story line shows us the assassins' persecution. Each aspect of the book's plot reveals a different viewpoint on the Dominican Republic's political and social environment, past and present.

Readers are shown the regime's downward spiral, Trujillo's assassination, and its aftermath through the eyes of insiders, conspirators, and a middle-aged woman looking back. The novel is therefore a kaleidoscopic portrait of dictatorial power, including its psychological effects and its long-term impact. The novel's themes include the nature of power and corruption, and their relationship to machismo or sexual perversion in a rigidly hierarchical society with strongly gendered roles. Memory, and the process of remembering, is also an important theme, especially in Urania's narrative as she recalls her youth in the Dominican Republic. Her story (and the book as a whole) ends when she recounts the terrible events that led to her leaving the country at the age of 14.

Vargas Llosa interlaces fictional elements and historical events: the book is not a documentary and the Cabral family, for instance, is completely fictional. On the other hand, the characters of Trujillo and Trujillo's assassins are drawn from the historical record; Vargas Llosa weaves real historical incidents of brutality and oppression into these people's stories, to further illuminate the nature of the regime and the responses it provoked. In Vargas Llosa's words, "It's a novel, not a history book, so I took many, many liberties. [. . .] I have respected the basic facts, but I have changed and deformed many things in order to make the story more persuasive—and I have not exaggerated."

The Feast of the Goat received largely positive reviews, with several reviewers commenting on the book's depiction of the relationship between sexuality and power, as well as the graphic descriptions of violent events. It has been described as a powerful exploration of the atrocities associated with dictatorship, and a testament to the dangers of absolute power.

A film version of the novel was released in 2005, starring Isabella Rossellini, Paul Freeman, and Tomas Milian. Jorge Alí Triana and his daughter, Veronica Triana, wrote a theatrical adaptation in 2003.

== Background ==
The Feast of the Goat is only the second of Vargas Llosa's novels to be set outside Peru (the first being The War of the End of the World). It is also unusual because it's the first to have a female protagonist: as critic Lynn Walford writes of the leading character in The Feast of the Goat, and also Vargas Llosa's subsequent book The Way to Paradise, "both are utterly unlike any of the other female characters in his previous novels".

The people celebrate
and go all the way
for the Feast of the Goat
the Thirtieth of May

—"They Killed the Goat"
A Dominican merengue

— Lyrics from Mataron al Chivo, as quoted at the beginning of the novel.

The novel examines the dictatorial regime of Rafael Leónidas Trujillo Molina in the Dominican Republic. Trujillo was, in historian Eric Roorda's words, "a towering influence in Dominican and Caribbean history" who presided over "one of the most durable regimes of the twentieth century" during the thirty-one years between his seizure of power in 1930 and his assassination in 1961. Trujillo had trained with the United States Marine Corps during the United States occupation of the island, and graduated from the Haina Military Academy in 1921. After the U.S. departed in 1924, he became head of the Dominican National Police which, under his command, was transformed into the Dominican National Army and Trujillo's personal "virtually autonomous power base".

Trujillo was officially dictator only from 1930 to 1938, and from 1942 to 1952, but remained in effective power throughout the entire period. Though his regime was broadly nationalist, Daniel Chirot comments that he had "no particular ideology" and his economic and social policies were basically progressive.

The novel's title is taken from the popular Dominican merengue Mataron al Chivo ("They Killed the Goat"), which refers to Trujillo's assassination on May 30, 1961. Merengue is a style of music created by Ñico Lora in the 1920s and actively promoted by Trujillo himself. It's now considered the country's national music. Cultural critics Julie Sellers and Stephen Ropp comment about this particular merengue that, by envisaging the dictator as an animal who could be turned into a stew (as frequently happened with goats struck down on the Dominican Republic's highways), the song "gave those performing, listening to, and dancing to this merengue a sense of control over him and over themselves that they had not experienced for over three decades." Vargas Llosa quotes the lyrics to Mataron al Chivo at the beginning of his novel.

== Plot summary ==
The novel's narrative is divided into three distinct strands. One is centred on Urania Cabral, a fictional Dominican character; another deals with the conspirators involved in Trujillo's assassination; and the third focuses on Trujillo himself. The novel alternates between these storylines, while jumping back and forth from 1961 to 1996, with frequent flashbacks to periods earlier in Trujillo's regime.

The Feast of the Goat begins with the return of Urania to her hometown of Santo Domingo, a city which had been renamed Ciudad Trujillo during Trujillo's time in power. This storyline is largely introspective, dealing with Urania's memories and her inner turmoil over the events preceding her departure from the Dominican Republic thirty-five years earlier. Urania escaped the crumbling Trujillo regime in 1961 by claiming she planned to study under a tutelage of nuns in Michigan. In the following decades, she becomes a prominent and successful New York lawyer. She finally returns to the Dominican Republic in 1996, on a whim, before finding herself compelled to confront her father and elements of her past she has long ignored. As Urania speaks to her ailing father, Agustin Cabral, she recalls more and more of the anger and disgust that led to her thirty-five years of silence. Urania retells her father's descent into political disgrace, while revealing the betrayal that forms a crux between both Urania's storyline and that of Trujillo himself.

The second and third storylines are set in 1961, in the weeks prior to and following Trujillo's assassination on May 30. Each assassin has his own background story, explaining his motivation for their involvement in the assassination plot. Each has been wronged by Trujillo and his regime, by torture and brutality, or through assaults on their pride, religious faith, morality, and loved ones. Vargas Llosa weaves the tale of the men as memories recalled on the night of Trujillo's death, as the conspirators lie in wait for "The Goat". Interconnected with these stories are the actions of other famous Trujillistas of the time: Joaquín Balaguer, the puppet president; Johnny Abbes García, the merciless head of the Military Intelligence Service (SIM); and various others—some real, some composites of historical figures, and some purely fictional.

The third storyline is concerned with the thoughts and motives of Rafael Leónidas Trujillo Molina himself. The chapters concerning The Goat recall the major events of his time, including the slaughter of thousands of Dominican Haitians in 1937. They also deal with the Dominican Republic's tense international relationships during the Cold War, especially with the United States under the presidency of John F. Kennedy and Cuba under Castro. Vargas Llosa also speculates upon Trujillo's innermost thoughts and paints a picture of a man whose physical body is slowly failing him. Trujillo is tormented by both his incontinence and impotence. Eventually, his storyline intersects with Urania's narrative when it's revealed that Urania was sexually assaulted by Trujillo. He is unable to achieve an erection with Urania and, in frustration, rapes her with his bare hands. This event is the core of Urania's shame and hatred towards her own father. In addition, it's the cause of Trujillo's repeated anger over the "anemic little bitch" who witnessed his impotence and emotion, as well as the reason he's en route to sleep with another girl on the night of his assassination.

In the novel's final chapters, the three storylines intersect with increasing frequency. The tone of these chapters is especially dark as they deal primarily with the horrific torture and death of the assassins at the hands of government agents, the failure of the coup, the rape of Urania, and the concessions made to Trujillo's most vicious supporters allowing them to enact their horrific revenge on the conspirators and escape the country. The book ends as Urania prepares to return home, determined this time to keep in touch with her family back on the island.

== Characters ==
=== Modern day ===
Urania Cabral and her father Agustín Cabral appear in both the modern day and historical portions of the novel. In the year 1996, Urania returns to the Dominican Republic for the first time since her departure at the age of 14. She is a successful New York lawyer who has spent most of the past 35 years trying to overcome the traumas of her childhood, a goal she pursues through an academic fascination with Trujillo and Dominican history. Urania is deeply troubled by the events of her past, and is compelled to confront her father Agustín about his role in those events. Urania visits her father, finding him weakened by age and a severe stroke, so much so that he is barely able to respond physically to her presence, let alone speak. Agustín listens helplessly as Urania recounts his past as "Egghead Cabral", a high-ranking member of Trujillo's inner circle, and his drastic fall from grace. Urania details Agustín's role in the events that led to her rape by the Dominican leader, and subsequent lifetime of celibacy and emotional trauma. Agustín's character in the modern day portion of the novel serves primarily as a sounding board for Urania's recollections of the Trujillo era, and the events that surrounded both Agustín Cabral's disgrace and Urania's escape from the country. His responses are usually minimal or non-vocal, despite the ardency of Urania's accusations and the enormity of his own actions during Trujillo's reign.

=== The Trujillo regime ===
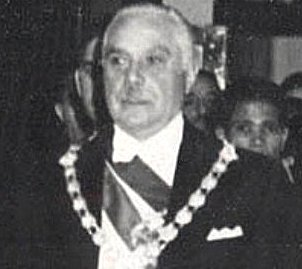
The Dominican Republic's dictator, and the central figure of The Feast of the Goat, Rafael Leónidas Trujillo

Rafael Trujillo, known also as The Goat, The Chief, and The Benefactor, is a fictionalized character based on the real dictator of the Dominican Republic from 1930 to 1961 and the official President of the Republic from 1930 to 1938 and 1943 to 1952. In The Feast of the Goat, Vargas Llosa imagines the innermost thoughts of the dictator, and retells the Goat's last hours from his own perspective.

Trujillo's character struggles with aging and the physical problems of incontinence and impotence. Through fictional events and first person narrative, the reader is given insight into the man who, during his "thirty-one years of horrendous political crimes", modernized the country's infrastructure and military, but whose regime's attack against its enemies overseas (particularly the attempted assassination of Rómulo Betancourt, president of Venezuela) led to the imposition of economic sanctions on the Dominican Republic by the Organization of American States in the 1950s. The resultant economic downturn, in conjunction with other factors, leads to the CIA-supported assassination plot that ended Trujillo's life on May 30, 1961.

Trujillo's regime is supported by Johnny Abbes García, the head of the Military Intelligence Service (SIM), a brutal man to whom many "disappearances, ... executions, ... sudden falls into disgrace" are attributed. Abbes and his intelligence officers are notorious for their cruelty, particularly their habit of killing dissidents by throwing them into shark-infested waters. Colonel Abbes "may be the devil, but he's useful to the Chief; everything bad is attributed to him and only the good to Trujillo". Trujillo's son, Ramfis Trujillo, is a loyal supporter of the Chief. After unsuccessful attempts at schooling in the United States, Ramfis returns to the Dominican Republic to serve in his father's military. He's a well-known womanizer. Upon Trujillo's death, Ramfis seeks revenge, even going so far as to torture and kill his uncle by marriage, General Jose Roman, for his part in the assassination conspiracy.

Joaquín Balaguer, Trujillo's puppet president, is also a supporter, and initially his seemingly innocuous character holds no real power. Following Trujillo's death, the calm and serenity of Balaguer bring about real change in his character, and General Román comments that "this insignificant man whom everyone had always considered a mere clerk, a purely decorative figure in the regime, began to acquire surprising authority". It's Balaguer who guides much of the action in the last sections of the book.

=== Conspirators ===
The storyline concerning the assassination primarily follows the four conspirators who directly participate in Trujillo's death. Antonio Imbert Barrera is one of the few conspirators who survives the violent reprisals that follow Trujillo's assassination. Imbert is a politician who becomes disillusioned with the deception and cruelty of Trujillo's regime. His first plan to kill Trujillo was foiled by the unsuccessful attempted overthrow of the regime by Cuban paramilitary forces. Now convinced of the difficulty of his task, Imbert joins the other conspirators in plotting Trujillo's death. Among the others is Antonio de la Maza, one of Trujillo's personal guards. Antonio's brother is killed as part of a government cover-up and Antonio swears revenge upon Trujillo. Salvador Estrella Sadhalá, known as "Turk", is a devout Catholic who, in indignation at the regime's many crimes against God, swears an oath against Trujillo. Turk eventually turns himself in for fear that the regime was torturing his family. Both Turk and his innocent brother are then tortured for months. His father remains loyal to Trujillo and disowns Turk in his face. Despite all of this, Turk refuses to commit suicide and doesn't lose faith in God. He is later executed by Ramfis and other high level government men. Turk's close friend, Amado García Guerrero, known as Amadito, is a Lieutenant in the army who gave up his beloved as proof of his loyalty to Trujillo, and then later was forced to kill her brother to prove himself to Trujillo. Amadito's disgust with himself and disillusionment with the regime lead to his decision to help kill Trujillo. Following the assassination, he hides out with de la Maza and dies fighting. In the aftermath of the assassination, Amadito and Antonio de la Maza choose to fight the members of SIM who come to arrest them, opting to die in battle rather than be captured and tortured.

== Major themes ==
The Feast of the Goat's major themes include political corruption, machismo, memory, and writing and power. Olga Lorenzo, reviewer for The Melbourne Age, suggests that overall Vargas Llosa's aim is to reveal the irrational forces of Latin tradition that give rise to despotism.

=== Political corruption ===
The structure of Dominican society was hierarchical, with strongly gendered roles. Rafael Trujillo, the ruler, was a cruel dictator who haunts the people of Santo Domingo even 35 years after his death. He is a true caudillo, ruling with brutality and corruption. He creates a personality cult in his capitalist society and encourages decadence within his regime. Prior to their promotion for a position of responsibility, an officer is required to pass a "test of loyalty". His people must remain loyal to him all cost. Their obedience is periodically tested by public humiliation and censure, even though acts of disloyalty were rare. Trujillo violates both women and children as an expression of his political/sexual power. In some cases, he sexually assaults the wife or child of his own lieutenants, many of whom still remain blindly loyal. Even the church and military institutions are employed to give women to the tyrant for pleasure.

Many of the assassins had belonged to Trujillo's regime or had at one point been his staunch supporters, only to find their support for him eroded by the state's crimes against its own citizens. Imbert, one of the assassins, sums up this realization in a comment prompted by the murder of the Mirabal sisters: "They kill our fathers, our brothers, our friends. And now they're killing our women. And here we sit, resigned, waiting our turn." In an interview, Vargas Llosa describes the corruption and brutality of Trujillo's regime: "He had more or less all the common traits of a Latin American dictator, but pushed to the extreme. In cruelty, I think he went far far away from the rest—and in corruption, too."

=== Machismo ===
According to literary scholar Peter Anthony Neissa, the two important components of machismo are aggressive behaviour and hyper-sexuality. Aggressive behaviour is exhibited by displays of power and strength, while hyper-sexuality is revealed through sexual activity with as many partners as possible. These two components shape the portrayal of Trujillo and his regime in The Feast of the Goat. As Lorenzo observes, Vargas Llosa "reveals traditions of machismo, of abusive fathers, and of child-rearing practices that repeat the shaming of children, so that each generation bequeaths a withering of the soul to the subsequent one."

In a display of both aspects of machismo, Trujillo demanded that his aides and cabinet provide him with sexual access to their wives or daughters. Mario Vargas Llosa wrote of Trujillo's machismo and treatment of women, "[h]e went to bed with his ministers' wives, not only because he liked these ladies but because it was a way to test his ministers. He wanted to know if they were ready to accept this extreme humiliation. Mainly the ministers were prepared to play this grotesque role—and they remained loyal to Trujillo even after his death." Trujillo's sexual conquests and public humiliations of his enemies also serve to affirm his political power and machismo. In Neissa's words, "The implication is that maximum virility equals political dominance."

Trujillo's attempted sexual conquest of Urania is an example of both political manipulation of Agustín Cabral and sexual power over young women. However, as Trujillo's penis remains flaccid throughout the encounter and he is humiliated in front of the young girl, the encounter fails to satisfy his requirements for machismo.

=== Memory ===
All of the novel's storylines concern memory in some sense or another. The most apparent confrontation of memory is on the part of Urania Cabral, who has returned to the Dominican Republic for the first time in 30 years. Soon, Urania is forced to confront her father and the traumas that led her to leave the country at 14. She was the victim of sexual abuse at the hands of Trujillo himself, a sacrifice her father made to try to gain favor with the dictator again (a fact to which she alludes throughout the book, but which is only revealed at the very end). The book concludes with her recounting the memory of that night to her aunt and cousins, who never knew the true reason she left the country. When her aunt is surprised that she remembers all these details, Urania responds that while she forgets many things, "I remember everything about that night." For Urania, forgetting the atrocities committed by the regime is unacceptable. Her father, on the other hand, is not capable of joining her in this process of remembering, since he has suffered a stroke and is not capable of speaking. However, Urania is angry that he chose to forget these things while he was still capable of acknowledging them.

Memory is also important in the sections of the novel that deal with the assassins. Each recalls the events that led him to take part in the assassination of Trujillo. These incidents included the 1956 Galindez kidnapping and murder, the 1960 murder of the Mirabal sisters, and the 1961 split with the Catholic Church. These historical events are used by Vargas Llosa to connect the assassins with specific moments that demonstrate the violence of Trujillo's regime. Trujillo, too, is shown reflecting on the past, not least his own formation and training at the hands of the US Marines.

But above all, Mario Vargas Llosa uses the fictional Urania to facilitate the novel's attempt at remembering the regime. The novel opens and closes with Urania's story, effectively framing the narrative in the terms of remembering the past and understanding its legacy in the present. In addition, because of her academic study of the history of the Trujillo regime, Urania is also confronting the memory of the regime for the country as a whole. This is in keeping with one purpose of the book, which is to ensure that the atrocities of the dictatorship and the dangers of absolute power will be remembered by a new generation.

=== Writing and power ===
In her treatment of the novel, María Regina Ruiz claims that "power gives its wielder the ability to make prohibitions; prohibitions that are reflected in history, the study of which reveals what is and what is not told." The government's actions in The Feast of the Goat demonstrate the discourse of prohibition: foreign newspapers and magazines were prohibited from entering Trujillo's country as they were seen as a threat to the government's ideas. Mario Vargas Llosa takes part in this discourse by recounting what was prohibited.

Ruiz notes that writing also has the power to transform reality. It brings the reader back to the past, allowing the reader to comprehend myths or distorted stories told by historians. Ruiz contends that knowing the past is crucial to one's understanding of the present that takes us to postmodernism, and argues that The Feast of the Goat can thus be seen as a postmodern discourse that gives power to history recreation.

The construction of fictions surrounding the events of Trujillo's regime allow a degree of freedom from the horrors that took places. Author Julia Alvarez contends that these events can "only finally be understood by fiction, only finally be redeemed by the imagination", while Richard Patterson claims that Vargas Llosa "reconfigures, and to a large degree demythologizes" Trujillo and his brutal reign through use of narrative structure. Vargas Llosa's writing acts as a cathartic force for this period in history.

== Fact and fiction ==
The novel is a combination of fact and fiction. Blending together these two elements is important in any historical novel, but especially in The Feast of the Goat because Vargas Llosa chose to narrate an actual event through the minds of both real and fictional characters. Some characters are fictional, and those that are non-fictional still have fictionalized aspects in the book. The general details of the assassination are true, and the assassins are all real people. While they lie in wait for the Dictator to arrive, they recount actual crimes of the regime, such as the murder of the Mirabal sisters. However, other details are invented by Vargas Llosa, such as Amadito's murder of the brother of the woman he loved.

Those within the regime are also a mix of fictional characters and real people. President Balaguer is real, but the entire Cabral family is completely fictional. According to Wolff, Vargas Llosa "uses history as a starting point in constructing a fictionalized account of Trujillo's "spiritual colonization" of the Dominican Republic as experienced by one Dominican family. The fictional Cabral family allows Vargas Llosa to show two sides of the Trujillo regime: through Agustin, the reader sees ultimate dedication and sacrifice to the leader of the nation; through Urania, the violence of the regime and the legacy of pain it left behind. Vargas Llosa also fictionalized the internal thoughts of the characters who were non-fictional, especially those of the Goat himself. According to literary scholar Richard Patterson, "Vargas Llosa's expands all the way into the very "dark area" of Trujillo's consciousness (as the storyteller dares to conceive it)."

Vargas Llosa also built an image of the regime with the troubled historical events. With regard to the historical accuracy of the book, Vargas Llosa has said "It's a novel, not a history book, so I took many, many liberties. The only limitation I imposed on myself was that I was not going to invent anything that couldn't have happened within the framework of life in the Dominican Republic. I have respected the basic facts, but I have changed and deformed many things in order to make the story more persuasive—and I have not exaggerated."

== Critical reception ==
The realist style of The Feast of the Goat is recognized by some reviewers as being a break from a more allegorical approach to the dictator novel. The novel received largely positive reviews, most of which were willing to accept sacrifices of historical accuracy in favour of good storytelling.

A common comment on the novel is the graphic nature of the many acts of torture and murder, which are depicted in the novel. Vargas lets the reader see the realities of an oppressive regime with a degree of detail not often used by his compatriots in Latin American literature, as Michael Wood suggests in the London Review of Books: "Vargas Llosa ... tells us far more about the details of day-to-day intrigue, and the sordid, sadistic minutiae of torture and murder." Walter Kirn of The New York Times suggests that the "grisly scenes of dungeon interrogations and torture sessions" cast other aspects of the novel in a pale light, draining them of their significance and impact. Similarly, Kirn implies that the "narrative machinery" mentioned by Wood as being somewhat unwieldy also produces a largely superfluous storyline. The plot line centered on Urania Cabral is described by Sturrock as being an emotional centre that focuses the novel, and Wood agrees that her confrontations with past demons hold the readers attention. In contrast, Kirn's review states that Urania's segments are "talky and atmospheric ... [and] seem to be on loan from another sort of book."

Most reviews of The Feast of the Goat make either indirect of direct reference to the relationship between sexuality and power. Salon reviewer Laura Miller, writer for The Observer Jonathan Heawood, Walter Kirn, and Michael Wood each detail the connection between Trujillo's gradual loss of ultimate control, both over his body and his followers. The means by which Trujillo reinforces political power through sexual acts and begins to lose personal conviction as his body fails him, are topics of frequent discussion among reviewers.

In 2011 Bernard Diederich, author of the 1978 non-fiction book Trujillo: The Death of the Goat, accused Vargas-Llosa of plagiarism.

== Adaptations ==
An English-language film adaptation of the novel was made in 2005, directed by Luis Llosa, Mario Vargas Llosa's cousin. It stars Isabella Rossellini as Urania Cabral, Paul Freeman as her father Agustin, Stephanie Leonidas as Uranita and Tomas Milian as Rafael Leonidas Trujillo. It was filmed in both the Dominican Republic and in Spain. Reviewing the film for the trade paper Variety, critic Jonathan Holland called it "less a feast than a somewhat rushed, but thoroughly enjoyable, three-course meal", commenting that the main difference from the source novel was the sacrifice of psychological nuance.

The novel has also been adapted for the stage, by Jorge Alí Triana and his daughter Veronica Triana, directed by Jorge Triana: the play was put on (in Spanish, but with simultaneous translation to English) at Repertorio Español (www.repertorio.org/chivo) in New York in 2003; and the production moved to Lima in 2007. A feature of the novel's stage version is that the same actor plays both Agustin Cabral and Rafael Trujillo. For reviewer Bruce Weber, this makes the point "that Trujillo's control of the nation depended on gutless collaborators".
