= Autobiografía del general Franco =

1992 novel by Manuel Vázquez Montalbán

Autobiography of general Franco
- Author: Manuel Vázquez Montalbán
- Original title: Autobiografía del general Franco
- Language: Spanish
- Genre: Novel
- Publication date: 1992
- Publication place: Spain

Autobiografía del general Franco (1992) (English, Autobiography of general Franco) is a novel by Manuel Vázquez Montalbán. In 1994 it was awarded the international prize Premio Internacional de Literatura Ennio Flaiano.

== Translations ==
The novel has not yet been translated into English. Published translations are:

- 1994 (French, Bernard Cohen) Moi, Franco
- 1994 (Italian, Hado Lyria) Io, Franco
- 1995 (Dutch) Autobiografie van generaal Franco
- 1996 (Portuguese, Ricardo de Azevedo) Autobiografia do general Franco
