= Pedro Bartolomé Benoit =

Dominican Republic politician and military officer

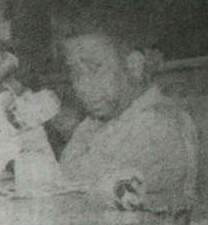

President of the Dominican Republic
- In office 1 May 1965 – 5 May 1965
- Preceded by: José Rafael Molina Ureña
- Succeeded by: Antonio Imbert Barrera

Personal details
- Born: 13 February 1921 Samaná, Samaná Province, Dominican Republic
- Died: 5 April 2012 (aged 91) Santo Domingo Este, Santo Domingo Province, Dominican Republic

Pedro Bartolomé Benoit Vanderhorst (February 13, 1921, Samaná – April 5, 2012) was a politician and military officer from the Dominican Republic. He served as the 7th provisional president of the Dominican Republic from 1 May until 7 May 1965. He was also a member of the Revolutionary Committee, which ruled the country for about few hours on 25 April 1965.
