= Fair of Peace and Fraternity of the Free World =

1955-1956 Santo Domingo
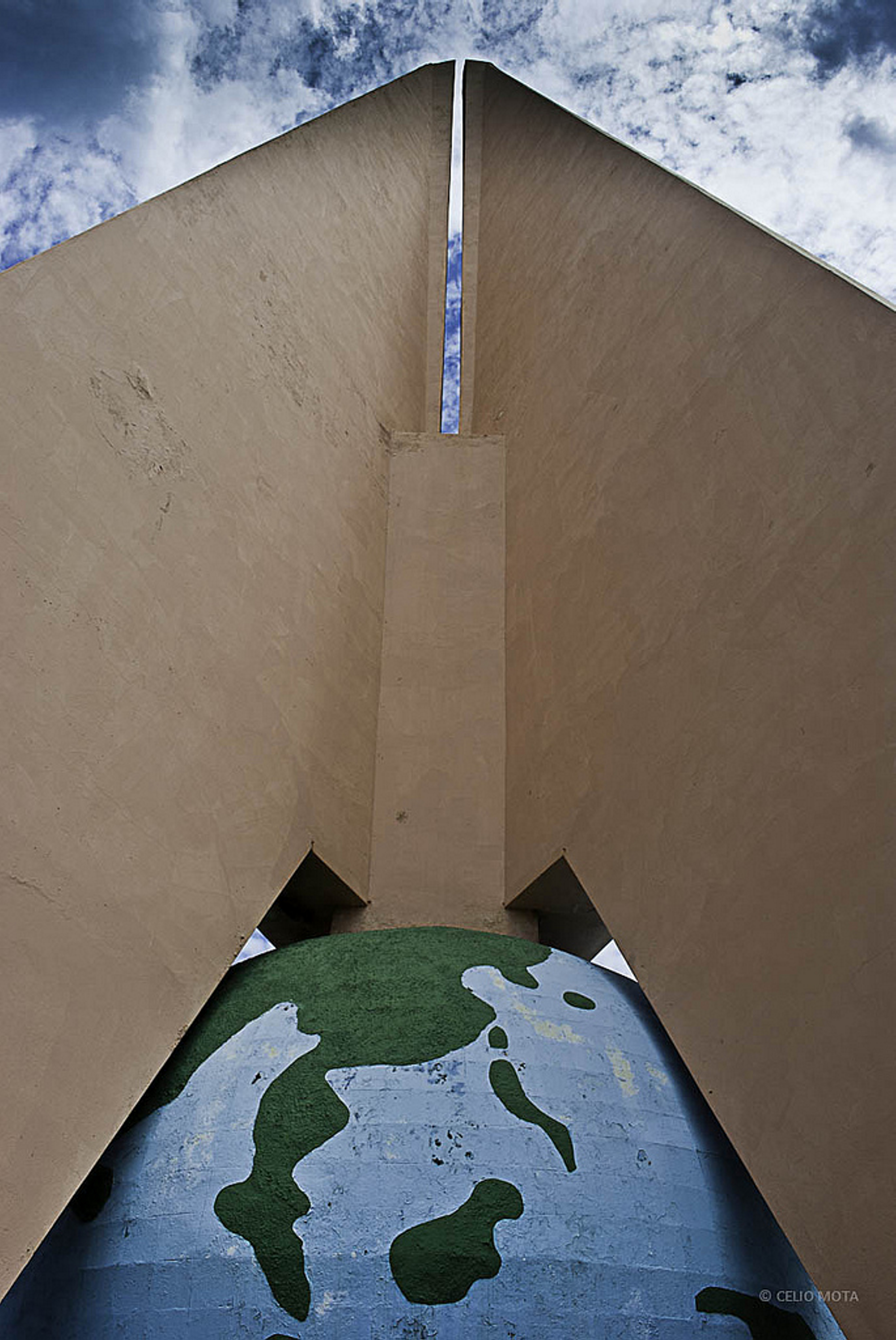
- Feria de la Paz

Overview
- BIE-class: Unrecognized exposition
- Name: Fair of Peace and Fraternity of the Free World
- Area: 125 acres (51 ha)

Participant(s)
- Countries: 42

Location
- Country: Dominican Republic
- City: Santo Domingo
- Coordinates: 18°28′35″N 69°53′35″W

Timeline
- Opening: 20 December 1955
- Closure: 16 August 1956

The Fair of Peace and Fraternity of the Free World (Feria de la Paz y Confraternidad del Mundo Libre) was an international world's fair that took place during the Trujillo Era in Santo Domingo, Dominican Republic (then called Ciudad Trujillo) in 1955–56.

== Planning ==
The fair was organized to honor Rafael Trujillo and his regime at the twenty-fifth anniversary of their rule Alvarez Pina was nominated as president of the organizing commission in July 1955. A tract of land on the western edge of the capital was set aside for the fair grounds. Forty-two nations agreed to participate. A new hotel, the El Embajador, was built with the penthouse for Trujillo's personal use. In the short time of only six months a majority of the construction was completed. However, at the deadline of December 20, a third of the planned structures and exhibits were not yet ready.

== The Fair ==
On December 20, 1955 Hector Trujillo cut the opening ribbon and Rafael Trujillo delivered the address summarizing his achievements. Trujillo's daughter, the 16-year-old Angelita, was crowned as "Queen Angelita I" to preside over the fair. Accompanied by 150 "princesses" she wore a white satin dress bordered with 600 Russian ermine furs and a 75-foot train that had been commissioned for $80,000 at Fontana from Rome. A military parade impressed the strength of the Dominican military.

At the Plaza de las Naciones, the entry to the exhibition, two large sculptural pieces were erected, a harp intoning the winds and a colossus (Atlas or Apollo) with raised arms holding a dove and the universe; both structures were destroyed by Hurricane David in 1979. Seventy-five permanent buildings were constructed for the fair. Xavier Cugat and his New York City Latin Band were contracted among others for entertainment. Notable permanent buildings include the City Hall and the National Congress, both by Guillermo González Sánchez, and the endangered Teatro Agua Y Luz by Carles Buïgas. Industrial and agricultural exhibits accompanied the fair. A cattle exhibition was of special interest to Trujillo with his interest in cattle breeding.

Visitors included president Kubitschek of Brasil and dignitaries from many nations.

== Aftermath ==
Many physical structures of the fair survived; a number of the permanent buildings were turned over for use as government offices. Financially, however, the result was disappointing as attendance was below what had been expected and investments failed to materialize. The cost of $30 million was a sizable expense equal to a third of the annual budget. Crassweller judged the fair to be "a costly misfortune".

== Literature ==
- Album de oro de la Feria de la Paz y Confraternidad del Mundo Libre. Editora del caribe, Ciudad Trujillo, 1956
