= Reconoci.do =

Activists of Haitian descent in the Dominican Republic

reconoci.do is an activist group in the Dominican Republic, fighting discrimination against Dominicans who have ancestors from Haiti.

== Background ==
There is a long history of this kind of discrimination in the Dominican Republic. In the 1930s, the country even massacred people it thought were Haitian. Recently, the Republic attempted to strip citizenship from people it believes are Haitian.

== History ==
Reconci.do was founded in November 2011, after the Dominican Central Electoral Board suspended the validity of birth certificates and identity papers of Dominicans of Haitian descent.

In March 2013, a protest was organised by reconoci.do outside the Dominican Central Electoral Board in Santo Domingo over the Board's refusal to provide Dominicans of Haitian descent with identity documents. The protest was violently broken up by police, with 15 activists being arrested and at least one injured after being tear-gassed while lying prone on the ground. The arrests were condemned by Amnesty International.

In March 2015, an exhibition was held at the Jordan Schnitzer Museum of Art on the group.

In June 2020, the group organised a solidarity protest called "A flower for Floyd" after the murder of George Floyd, but were attacked by the far-right Old Dominican Order and several reconoci.do organisers were arrested by police.
