= Galíndez =

Historical novel by Manuel Vázquez Montalbán

- First edition (publ. Seix Barral)
- Author: Manuel Vázquez Montalbán
- Translator: Carol & Thomas Christensen
- Language: Spanish
- Publisher: Seix Barral, Atheneum
- Publication date: 1990
- Publication place: Spain
- English publication date: 1992
- Media type: Print
- Pages: 343 p.
- ISBN: 9788432206238
- OCLC: 1024348007

Galíndez is a novel by Manuel Vázquez Montalbán, published in 1990. It centres on a real, dramatic and dark episode of the history of the Dominican Republic: the kidnapping, torturing and murdering of Jesús de Galíndez in 1956, representative of the Basque government in exile before the U.S. State Department and the involvement and cover-up by the CIA. The novel received Spain's National Literary Award in 1991 and the Europa Prize.

The detective and narrator of the novel is Muriel Corbert. She is a history graduate who seeks out the truth of Galíndez' fate. In doing so she travels from the United States, to Spain and then the Dominican Republic, and uncovers a conspiracy between Dominican dictator Rafael Trujillo, the CIA and Francoist Spain.

The novel was made into a film in 2003, called El Misterio Galíndez (literally "The Galindez Mystery", but also known as "The Galíndez File"). The film stars Saffron Burrows and Harvey Keitel.
