= Pepe Carvalho =

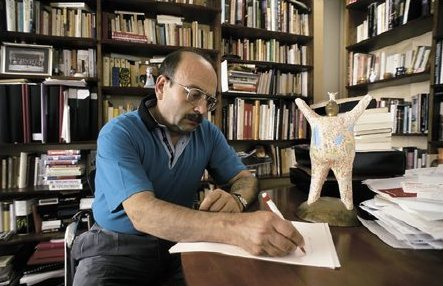
- Manuel Vázquez Montalbán, author of the Pepe Carvalho books
- First appearance: Yo maté a Kennedy (I killed Kennedy)
- Last appearance: Milenio Carvalho (Carvalho Millennium)
- Created by: Manuel Vázquez Montalbán

In-universe information
- Gender: Male
- Occupation: Private detective
- Nationality: Spanish

Pepe Carvalho is a fictional private detective, the protagonist of a series of novels written by Spanish writer Manuel Vázquez Montalbán.

== The character ==
Carvalho has a rich, complex and contradictory personality. The author uses his adventures to describe, and in many instances criticize, the political and cultural situation of Spanish society during the last half of the 20th century. For example, the self-destructive process of the Communist Party during the early period of the transition is being described in Asesinato en el Comité Central (Murder in the Central Committee); the fall of Felipism in the nineties is the background of El Premio (The Prize); and the changes which took place in Barcelona on the occasion of the Olympic Games in 1992 feature in Sabotaje Olímpico (An Olympic Death).

The Carvalho saga came to an end with the posthumous publication of Milenio Carvalho (Carvalho Millennium), in which the detective, accompanied by his inseparable partner Biscuter, imposes on himself one last adventure in the form of a world-trip that ends up being a bitter and melancholic glance at the sociopolitical situation in the world and the passing of time.

== Curiosities ==
- Carvalho was a communist in his youth, but also a CIA agent.
- The gastronomic passion of Carvalho and Biscuter reflects that of the author, so every novel includes passionate culinary descriptions of the most diverse dishes.
- Though Carvalho is a man of vast culture, a shocking feature of his personality is his frequent use of books from his extensive library as firewood.
- Though he is of Galician origin, Barcelona is his city. Although Carvalho is a great traveller and many of his adventures take place in other locations, the importance of the character has given the Catalan capital that mythical literary city air that Carvalho so much loves in other cities, such as the Singapore of William Somerset Maugham.

== Screen adaptations ==
Various novels starring Carvalho have been adapted for television, although none of the TV adaptations were as successful as the books. An eight-part TVE series starring Eusebio Poncela (with Ovidi Montlor as Biscuter) appeared in 1986, followed by an Argentinian-Spanish co-production with Juan Diego that was cancelled after the first episode; and finally, a ten-part Italian-Spanish co-production starring Juanjo Puigcorbé and Jean Benguigui in 1999.

Carvalho novels have been adapted to film on four occasions:

- Tatuaje (Tattoo, 1976), by Bigas Luna, starring Carlos Esteban.
- Asesinato en el Comité Central (Murder in the Central Committee, 1983), by Vicente Aranda, starring Patxi Andión in the role of the detective.
- El laberinto griego (The Greek labyrinth, 1990), by Rafael Alcázar, starring Omero Antonutti (in a character who changed the name Carvalho for Bardón).
- Los mares del sur (The Southern Seas, 1991), by Manuel Esteban, with Juan Luis Galiardo in the role of Carvalho and Carlos Lucena as Biscuter.

== Bibliography ==
1. Yo maté a Kennedy. Impresiones, observaciones y memorias de un guardaespaldas (I killed Kennedy: Impressions, observations and memories of a bodyguard, 1972)
2. Tatuaje (Tattoo, 1974)
3. La soledad del manager (The Angst-Ridden Executive, 1977)
4. Los mares del Sur (The Southern Seas,1979)
5. Asesinato en el comité central (Murder in the Central Committee, 1981)
6. Los pájaros de Bangkok (The birds of Bangkok, 1983)
7. La Rosa de Alejandría (Alexandria's Rose, 1984)
8. El balneario (The Spa, 1986)
9. Historias de fantasmas (Ghost stories, 1987)
10. Historias de padres e hijos (Father and child stories, 1987)
11. Tres historias de amor (Three love stories, 1987)
12. Historias de política ficción (Politic fiction stories, 1987)
13. Asesinato en Prado del Rey y otras historias sórdidas (Murder in Prado del Rey and other sleazy short-stories, 1987)
14. El delantero centro fue asesinado al atardecer (Offside, 1988)
15. Las recetas de Carvalho (Carvalho's recipes, 1989; compilation of all the recipes that appear in the Carvalho novels).
16. El laberinto griego (The Greek labyrinth, 1991)
17. Sabotaje olímpico (An Olympic Death, 1993)
18. El hermano pequeño (The Small Brother, 1994)
19. Roldán, ni vivo ni muerto (Roldán, neither dead nor alive, 1994)
20. El premio (The prize, 1996)
21. El caso de la muchacha que pudo ser Emmmanuelle (The case of the girl who could have been Emmanuelle, 1997)
22. Quinteto en Buenos Aires (The Buenos Aires Quintet, 1997)
23. El hombre de mi vida (The Man of My Life, 2000)
24. Rumbo a Kabul - Milenio Carvalho, Vol. 1 (Direction Kabul - Carvalho Millennium, Vol. 1 - 2004)
25. En las antípodas - Milenio Carvalho, Vol 2 (In the Antipodes - Carvalho Millennium, Vol. 2 - 2004)
