= Carmen Imbert Brugal =

Dominican jurist, author, journalist and columnist

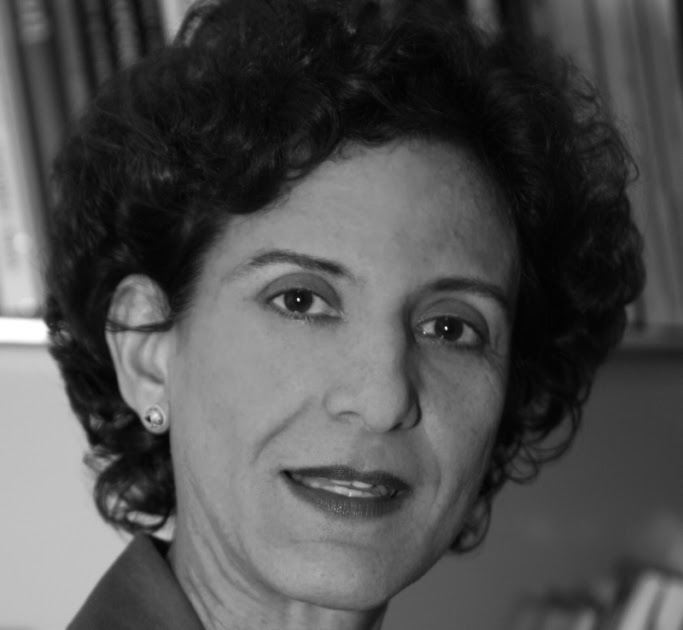

Member of the Central Electoral Board
- Incumbent
- Assumed office 21 November 2016

Personal details
- Born: 25 November 1955 (age 70) Ponce, Puerto Rico
- Children: 1
- Parent(s): Martha Brugal Mateos (mother), Segundo Imbert Barrera (father)
- Relatives: Antonio Imbert Barrera (uncle)
- Carmen Imbert Brugal on X

Carmen Altagracia Imbert Brugal (born 25 November 1955), is a Dominican jurist, author, journalist and columnist.

== Biography ==
=== Early life and family ===
Imbert was born during her mother's exile in Ponce, Puerto Rico. Her parents were Segundo Manuel Imbert Barrera (Major of the Dominican Army and the elder brother of General Antonio Imbert Barrera) and Martha Beatriz Brugal Mateos who was herself the daughter of immigrants from Spain and Cuba; her father was murdered by the Trujillo regime in 1961.

She is the great-granddaughter of both Segundo Imbert (former Vice President of the Dominican Republic) and Andrés Brugal (a rum businessman born in Spain), and great-great-granddaughter of José María Imbert (a native of France).

=== Career ===
Imbert holds a law degree magna cum laude from the Universidad Nacional Pedro Henríquez Ureña university (1978).

Imbert Brugal has been a professor at Universidad Nacional Pedro Henríquez Ureña, Universidad Iberoamericana (UNIBE), and Santo Domingo Institute of Technology.

In November 2016, Imbert was designated a member of the Central Electoral Board.

=== Later life ===
In 1983, she gave birth to her only child, Carlos Manuel Delgado Imbert.

== Works ==
- Palabras de Otros Tiempos y de Siempre (poetry; 1983)
- Prostitución: Esclavitud Sexual Femenina (essay; 1985)
- Infidencias (short stories; 1986)
- Tráfico de Mujeres: Visión de una Nación Explotada (essay; 1991)
- Distinguida Señora (novel; 1995)
- El Ministerio Público (essay; 1998)
- Volver Al Frío (novel; 2003)

Some writings authored by Imbert were published in Daisy Cocco de Filippis's anthologies like Combatidas, Combativas y Combatientes and Sin Otro Profeta que su Canto.
