= Ramfis Domínguez-Trujillo =

Dominican politician (born 1970)

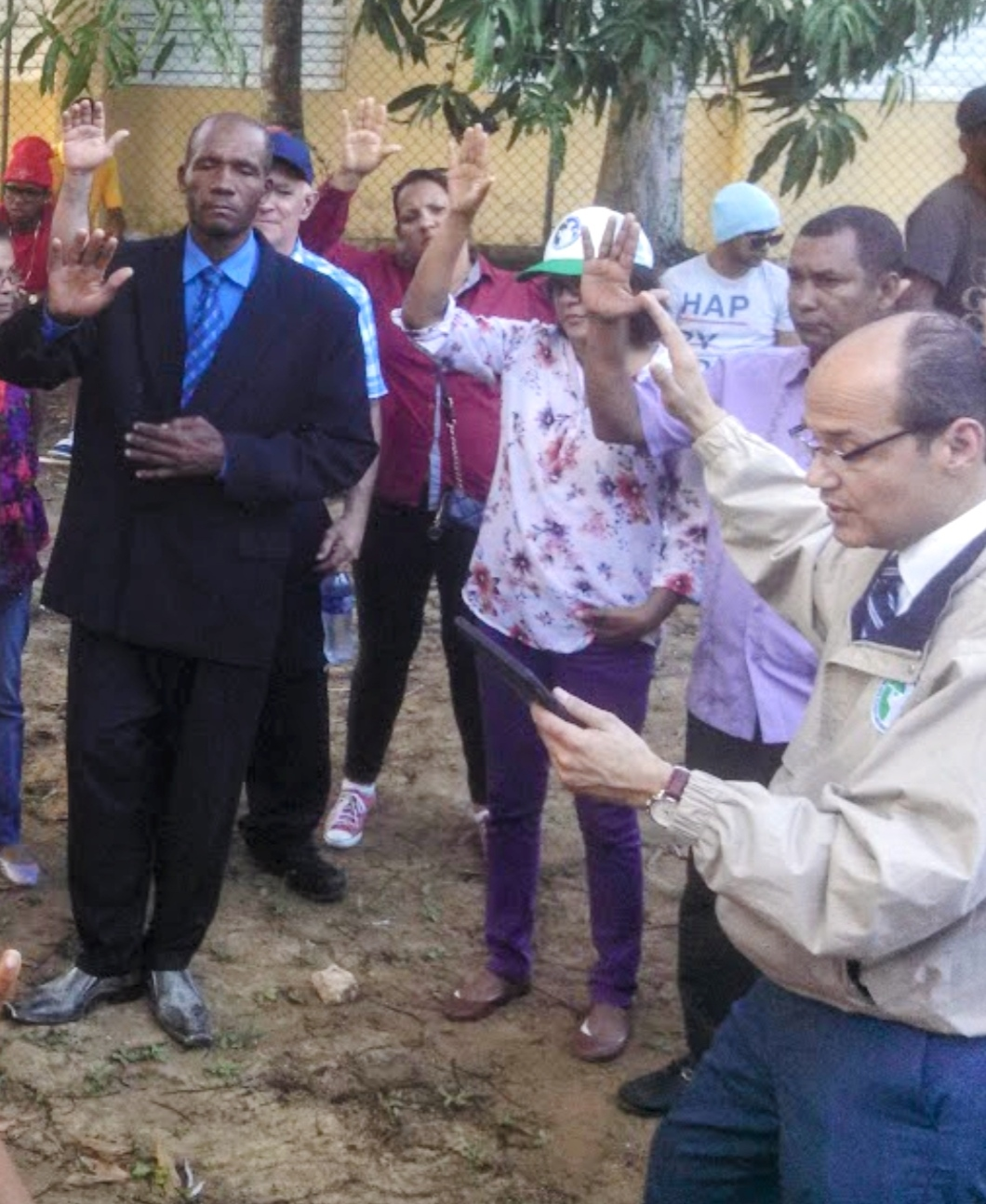
- Leader: Partido Esperanza Democrática

Personal details
- Born: Luis José Ramfis Rafael Domínguez-Trujillo; 22 May 1970 (age 56) New York City, U.S.
- Party: Partido Esperanza Democrática (PED)
- Children: 3
- Parents: Ret. Lt. Col. Luis José Domínguez Taveras (father); María de los Angeles Trujillo Martínez (mother)
- Education: University of Miami
- Occupation: politician
- Profession: businessman
- Website: Official website

Luis José Ramfis Rafael Domínguez-Trujillo, also known as Ramfis Domínguez-Trujillo (born May 22, 1970) is a Dominican politician.

== Biography ==
Domínguez-Trujillo is known for being the grandson of Dominican dictator Rafael Trujillo, who ruled the Dominican Republic from 1930 to 1961. He is the son of Trujillo's daughter, Angelita Trujillo and Luis José Domínguez Taveras, a retired Lieutenant Colonel of the Dominican Air Force. He is father to three daughters, all born in the United States.

Domínguez-Trujillo went to high school in Miami and went on to study business administration and international and comparative studies. In 2016, he announced his intentions to become candidate for President of the Dominican Republic in 2020. The candidacy was initially and unofficially held under the PDI (Partido Demócrata Institucional), but he left the ticket in 2019, calling out the party for its complicity with the corrupt political system, and wherein he decided to pursue his presidential candidacy as an independent, making him the first candidate to do so in all of the country's history. In late 2019, he reached a political agreement with the National Citizen Will Party, in order to present his candidacy through them, as a result of the electoral board’s failure to recognize independent candidacies.

However, in early 2020, the Junta Central Electoral, the electoral board charged with organizing the country's general elections, did not accept his candidacy, alleging that his dual nationality was not permitted under to the country's constitution, despite the fact that numerous presidential candidates have held and currently hold dual citizenship.

After the 2020 electoral process, he pursued the certification of the Partido Esperanza Democrática, and obtained official recognition from the JCE on June 9, 2023. He made his bid for the presidential candidacy, which was officially presented under his political organization to the JCE, in order to compete in the Dominican elections on May 19, 2024. He was again rejected by this Dominican electoral board, and although he pursued his case before the Tribunal Superior Electoral (the Dominican electoral tribunal), the case was intentionally extended beyond the deadline for the filing of all national candidacies, thereby forcing Domínguez-Trujillo to quickly find a last-minute replacement candidate.

Despite all the obstacles, and with Domínguez-Trujillo at the helm, the Partido Esperanza Democrática was able to move up in the rankings from the 32nd position to the 4th position at both the presidential level and the overseas Dominican congressional seats level, making his party one of the top political organizations of the Dominican Republic, with less than a year of having achieved official recognition.

In a post-election press conference in 2024 held at the party headquarters, Domínguez-Trujillo maintained that he has always qualified under the country’s constitution to be a presidential candidate for the Dominican Republic, and stated the only reason for his continued rejection was his tough stance on political corruption, and his unwillingness to pursue alliances with the established political system that, according to him, has done so much damage to the country and its people. He also said however, that he would not present his presidential candidacy again, until such time as he was able to obtain the necessary accreditation from the Dominican courts, while affirming his willingness to engage international tribunals if necessary. He claimed this process was in the works and hoped to obtain certification by 2026.

== Family tree ==
Ancestors of Ramfis Domínguez-Trujillo

8. Abraham Domínguez
4. Abraham Domínguez Batista
9. Ercilia Batista
2. Lt. Col. Luis José Domínguez Tavera
10. Félix Taveras Guzmán
5. Elodia Taveras Rodríguez
11. Josefa Rodríguez García
1. Luis José Ramfis Domínguez-Trujillo
12. José Juan de Dios Trujillo Valdez (1864–1935)
6. Gralmo. Rafael Leónidas Trujillo Molina (1891–1961)
13. Altagracia Julia Molina Chevalier (1865–1963)
3. María de los Ángeles del Sagrado Corazón de Jesús Trujillo Martínez (b. 1939)
14. Francisco de Paula del Sagrado Corazón de Jesús Martínez de Peña
7. María de la Paz del Sagrado Corazón de Jesús Martínez Alba (1899–1989)
15. Sebastiana de los Dolores Alba Martínez
