= Le Plessis-Grammoire =

- Commune
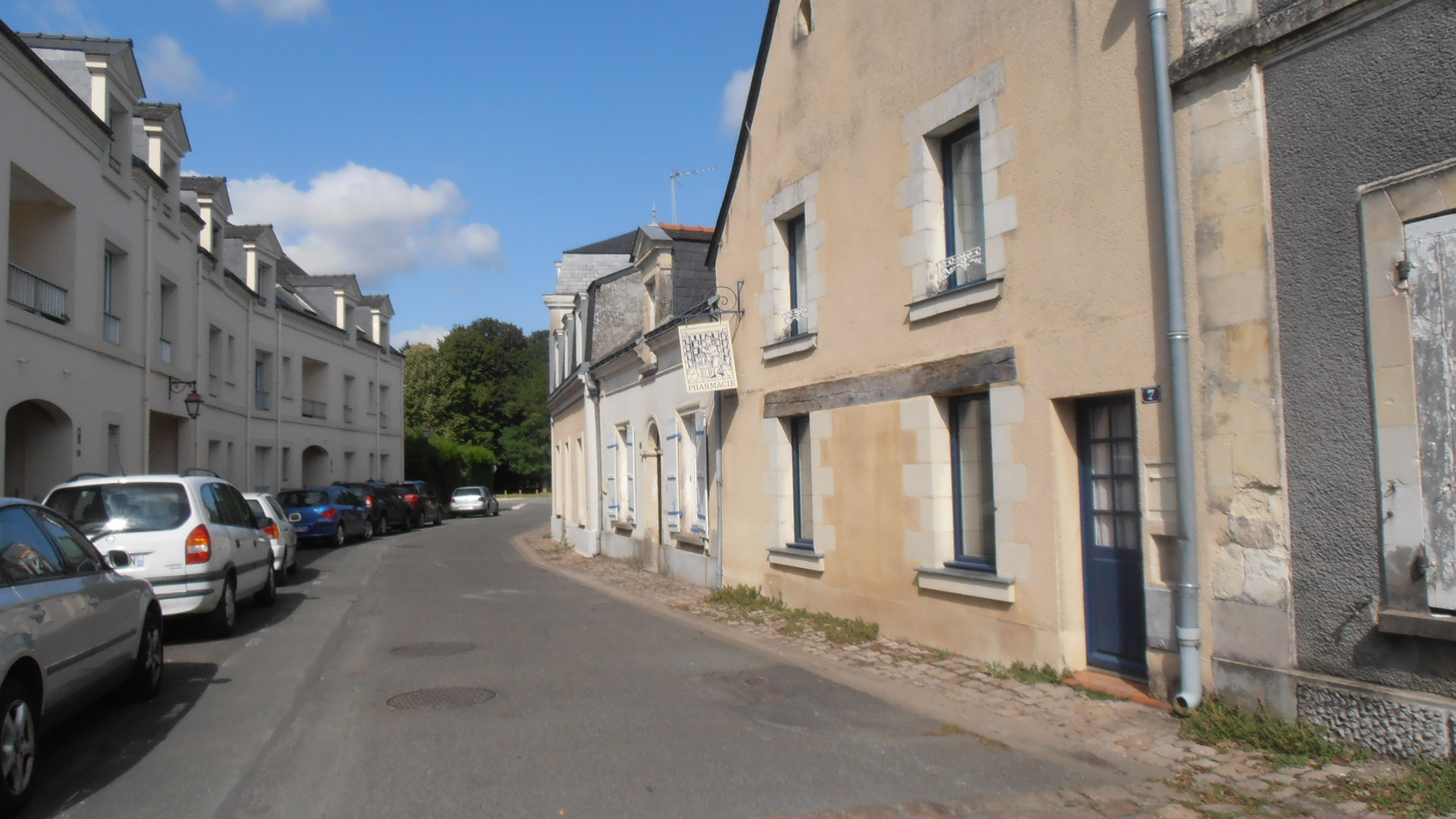
- A street in the centre of Le Plessis-Grammoire
- Location of Le Plessis-Grammoire
- Location within France Location within Pays de la Loire
- Coordinates: 47°30′04″N 0°25′43″W
- Country: France
- Region: Pays de la Loire
- Department: Maine-et-Loire
- Arrondissement: Angers
- Canton: Angers-7
- Intercommunality: CU Angers Loire Métropole

Government
  - Mayor (2020–2026): Philippe Abellard
- Area^{1}: 9.14 km^{2} (3.53 sq mi)
- Elevation: 34 m (112 ft)
- Highest elevation: 42 m (138 ft)
- Lowest elevation: 25 m (82 ft)
- Population (2023): 2,664
  - Density: 291/km^{2} (755/sq mi)
- Demonym(s): Plessiais, Plessiaise
- Time zone: UTC+01:00 (CET)
  - Summer (DST): UTC+02:00 (CEST)
- INSEE/Postal code: 49241 /49124
- ^{1} French Land Register data, which excludes lakes, ponds, glaciers > 1 km^{2} (0.386 sq mi or 247 acres) and river estuaries.

Le Plessis-Grammoire (French pronunciation: [lə plɛsi ɡʁamwaʁ]) is a commune in the Maine-et-Loire department in western France.

== Population ==
Historical population
Year	Pop.	±% p.a.
1968	780	—
1975	1,157	+5.79%
1982	1,545	+4.22%
1990	1,718	+1.34%
1999	2,013	+1.78%
2007	2,219	+1.23%
2012	2,295	+0.68%
2017	2,381	+0.74%
2023	2,664	+1.89%
Source: INSEE

== See also ==
- Communes of the Maine-et-Loire department
