= Johnny Abbes =

Dominican politician (1924–1967)

Johnny Abbes García (27 March 1924, Santo Domingo – 30 May 1967, Haiti) was the chief of the governmental intelligence office – the Servicio de Inteligencia Militar (Military Intelligence Service) – during the dictatorship of Rafael Trujillo in the Dominican Republic.

== Rise to power ==
Abbes was born in 1924 in Santo Domingo, Dominican Republic, the son of a German American accountant and a Dominican woman. As a young man he was interested in sports, and one of his first jobs was as a sports reporter. In the mid-fifties, he moved to Mexico, where he worked as an official in the Dominican embassy. He started to gather information on anti-Trujillo dissidents and relayed this information to the island. Abbes also studied the technical aspects of spying and intelligence gathering. In 1956 he returned to the Dominican Republic and, after Trujillo's half-brother Nene introduced him to the dictator, quickly rose to power.

== Head of SIM ==
In 1958 he became the head of the newly created Servicio de Inteligencia Militar (SIM) and the chief planner of assassinations of the regime's adversaries abroad. SIM employed thousands of people and was involved in immigration, passports, censorship, supervision of aliens, and undercover work, including foreign operations. Thus he was instrumental in the two attempts to kill Venezuela's then-president Rómulo Betancourt; first there was an attack on Betancourt in the streets of Havana to inject him with poison, later a car bomb blew up his Cadillac in Caracas, killing the driver and a bystander, while Betancourt survived.

== After Trujillo ==
After Trujillo's assassination in May 1961, Abbes moved quickly to hunt down the assassins. Trujillo's son, Ramfis Trujillo, returned from Paris, supposedly with the help of Abbes, and attempted to step into the place of his father, but his attempt ultimately failed, and he left the country, together with most members of the Trujillo family, later that year. Following the Trujillos' departure, President Joaquín Balaguer appointed Abbes consul to Japan, but Abbes soon left the post and spent several years in Europe. He returned to the Caribbean in 1966, moving to Haiti, where he worked for then-President François 'Papa Doc' Duvalier as a security advisor. Abbes disappeared in June 1967. According to journalist Bernard Diedrich, Abbes and his wife had come under suspicion for plotting against Duvalier, but the reasons for his disappearance, and those responsible, remain unknown.

Mario Vargas Llosa's historical novels The Feast of the Goat, about Trujillo's Dominican Republic, and Harsh Times, about Arbenz's Guatemala, devote much space to Abbes.
