= Servicio de Inteligencia Militar =

Secret police force in the Dominican Republic

The Servicio de Inteligencia Militar (SIM) (English: Military Intelligence Service) was the main secret police force and death squad during the later part of the dictatorship of Rafael Trujillo to keep control within the Dominican Republic.

== Operation ==
Around 1957 the Department of State for Security, headed by General Arturo Espaillat was dissolved, replaced by SIM and its sister agency, the Servicio Central de Inteligencia (SCI). Under the leadership of Johnny Abbes García, SIM employed thousands of people and was involved in immigration, passports, censorship, supervision of aliens, and undercover work. At the Palace of Communications some fifty people intercepted and recorded domestic and foreign phone conversations. Its secret activities used murder, kidnapping, extortion and terror to achieve its goals. Money was spent to lobby American legislators.

In the population members of SIM were known as "caliés" (Thugs), they patrolled the streets in their black VW beetles called "cepillos" (brushes). Infamous detention centers were La Nueve (The Nine) and La Cuarenta (The Forty) where prisoners were tortured and killed.

SIM was dissolved in 1962, after the fall of the Trujillo regime.

== Directors ==
| No. | Portrait | Director | Took office | Left office | Time in office |
|---|---|---|---|---|---|
| 1 | Johnny Abbes García | Colonel; Johnny Abbes García (1924–1967) | 1957 | 1960 | 2–3 years |
| 2 | Cándido Torres | Colonel; Cándido Torres | 1960 | 1960 | 0 years |
| 3 | Roberto Figueroa Carrión | Colonel; Roberto Figueroa Carrión | 1961 | 1962 | 0–1 years |

== Famous operations ==
- 1956: Murder of Jesús Galíndez
- 1958: Murder of Octavio de la Maza
- 1959: Attempt to invade Cuba
- 1960: Murder of the Mirabal sisters
- 1960: Attempt to assassinate Rómulo Betancourt
- 1961: Murder of assassins of Trujillo

== Cultural references ==
SIM and its leader Johnny Abbes García are frequently mentioned in Mario Vargas Llosa's historical novel The Feast of the Goat and in Julia Alvarez's novel In the Time of the Butterflies.
