= Angelita Trujillo =

Dominican writer (1939–2023)

Angelita Trujillo (10 June 1939 – 21 August 2023) was a Dominican writer who was most known as the daughter of the former Dominican dictator Rafael Trujillo.

== Early life ==
Angelita Trujillo was born María de los Ángeles del Sagrado Corazón de Jesús Trujillo Martínez on June 10, 1939 in the affluent Parisien suburb of Neuilly-sur-Seine, France. Daughter of the Dominican Republic dictator Rafael Trujillo and his third wife María de los Ángeles Martínez y Alba, known as la Españolita because of her Spanish origin, Trujillo enjoyed a privileged childhood. She was a special envoy of the Dominican government to the coronation of Queen Elizabeth II of the United Kingdom in 1953. Two years later, the Fair for the Peace and Fraternity of the Free World, was held in Trujillo City (present-day Santo Domingo) where the 16-year-old Angelita, was crowned as "Queen Angelita I" to preside over the world's fair.

== Exile ==
After her father’s assassination in 1961, the Trujillo family went into exile to Paris and later to Madrid. In Spain, Trujillo divorced Colonel Luis José León Estévez. After seven years in Madrid, Trujillo moved to New York City, where she met Colonel Luis José Domínguez Rodríguez, and married him.

== Personal life ==
Trujillo married Luis José León Estévez and Luis José Domínguez Rodríguez, both colonels of the Dominican Air Force. León Estévez hailed from Canca La Piedra in Tamboril (Santiago Province) and was the son of Manuel de Jesús León Jimenes and Dolores Ercilia Estévez Cabrera; Domínguez Rodríguez was native to Gurabo (Santiago Province) and his parents were José Ramón Domínguez Méndez and Mercedes Cervanda Rodríguez Taveras.

From her first marriage, she had three children: Luis José, Rafael Leónidas, and María de los Ángeles (b. Santo Domingo, April 1961; federal attorney and lawyer in the United States, she changed her surnames to "Domínguez Trujillo");, from her second marriage, she had a daughter María Mercedes, son Ramfis Domínguez-Trujillo (b. New York, 1970; presidential candidate to the Dominican Republic general election, 2020), and daughters María Laura and María Julia Domínguez-Trujillo.

Angelita Trujillo lived in Miami, Florida during most of her exile. She died there, on 21 August 2023, at the age of 84.

== Works ==
- "Trujillo, mi padre, en mis memorias" (2010)

Ancestors of Angelita Trujillo

8. José Trujillo Monagas (1841–circa 1890)
4. José Juan de Dios Trujillo Valdez (1865–1935)
9. Silveria Valdez Méndez
2. Rafael Leónidas Trujillo Molina (1891–1961)
10. Pedro Molina Peña (1840–?)
5. Altagracia Julia Molina Chevalier (1865–1963)
11. Luisa Erciná Chevalier (?–1940)
1. María de los Ángeles del Sagrado Corazón de Jesús Trujillo Martínez (born 1939)
12. Agustín Martínez
6. Francisco de Paula Martínez de Peña
13. Ana de Peña
3. María de los Ángeles Martínez Alba (circa 1915–?)
14. Andrés de Alba
7. Sebastiana de los Dolores Alba Martínez
15. Manuela Martínez

== Bibliography ==
- Crassweller, Robert D. Trujillo. The Life and Times of a Caribbean Dictator. The MacMIllan Co, New York, 1966. pp. 293–299.
- Espinal Hernández, Edwin Rafael (21 February 2009). "Descendencias Presidenciales: Trujillo" (in Spanish). Instituto Dominicano de Genealogía. Archived from the original on 14 October 2014.
- Thomas, Juan Eduardo (12 February 2015). "Nieto de Trujillo anuncia formación partido político" (in Spanish). Santo Domingo: Listín Diario. Archived from the original on 25 February 2015.
- Peña, Ángela (24 May 2008). "El abuelo valiente en la estirpe de Trujillo" (in Spanish). Hoy.
- Trujillo Ledesma, Flor de Oro; Vega, Bernardo. "Trujillo en la intimidad de según su hija Flor". (1965)
- Franjul, Miguel (25 May 2011). "Con la hija del Jefe: "No siento ningún odio por Imbert Barrera"" (in Spanish). Miami, Florida: Listín Diario. Archived from the original on 3 October 2015.
- Liberato, Ana S. Q. (2013). Joaquín Balaguer, Memory, and Diaspora: The Lasting Political Legacies of an American Protégé. Lexington Books. pp. 19–20. ISBN 9780739176474.
