= Bernard Diederich =

New Zealand-born, American journalist

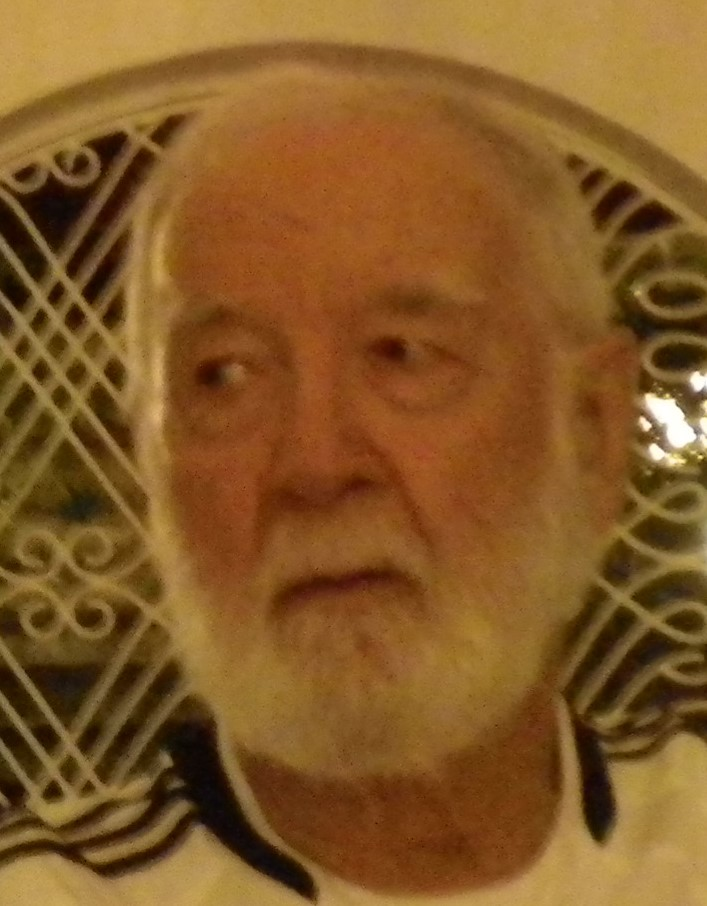
Bernard Diederich

Bernard Diederich (18 July 1926 – 14 January 2020) was a New Zealand-born author, journalist, and historian.

Diederich was born into an Irish-German family in Christchurch, where his father was a barman at the Empire Hotel. The family moved to rural Mākara, near Wellington, when he was 2, and he lived there until he was 16. In 2002 he wrote The Ghosts of Makara: Growing Up Down-Under in a Lost World of Yesteryears about his childhood. He attended Makara Primary School, then Marist Brothers' School in Thorndon and St Patrick's College for two years in the early 1940s, playing in the 1st XV rugby team and representing the school in boxing.

Diederich left school aged 16 to become a shipping clerk to prepare to join the crew of the barque Pamir, which left for San Francisco in early 1943. He was one of 12 boys in a crew of 40. He contributed to the ship's newsletter the Pamir Press. Upon arrival in the U.S., he enlisted in the United States Merchant Marine, serving aboard armed T2 oil tankers, including the Camas Meadows and Port Republic, in the Pacific theater until his discharge in Houston, Texas, in June 1946.

Diederich studied in England in the early postwar years after having participated in World War II in the Pacific. In 1949, Diederich started a sailing trip with two friends that brought him to Haiti, a country that since stayed close to his heart. He stayed and settled down, while his partners continued their trip.

In Port-au-Prince, he founded and edited the Haiti Sun, a weekly English newspaper about Haitian events. As a journalist he also became a freelance correspondent for the Associated Press, The New York Times, and The Daily Telegraph and others.

In 1961 he covered the assassination of Rafael Trujillo in the neighboring Dominican Republic. Two years later, after having displeased Haiti's dictator François "Papa Doc" Duvalier, he was briefly imprisoned and expelled. In the Dominican Republic he established himself as a staff correspondent for Time-Life News.

In 1966 Diederich moved to Mexico working for Time magazine covering Caribbean affairs. In 1981 the office was moved to Miami, and he worked there until his retirement in 1989. The author continued to publish after retirement with the focus on the political and historical developments in the Caribbean, notably in Haiti.

In 1954 Diederich met Graham Greene and the two became friends; later, as a result of their travel along the Haitian border Diederich wrote The Seeds of Fiction: Graham Greene's Adventures in Haiti and Central America 1954–1983, while Greene published The Comedians.

Diederich published a detailed account of Trujillo's assassination in Trujillo: Death of the Goat in 1978. After Mario Vargas Llosa published The Feast of the Goat, a fictionalized novel about Trujillo's death, in 2000, Diederich accused Vargas Llosa of plagiarism.

He died at his home in Frères, Port-au-Prince, on 14 January 2020, aged 93.

== Awards ==
- 1976 Maria Moors Cabot Gold Medal, Columbia University in New York
- 1983 Overseas Press Club's Mary Hemingway citation for the best reporting from abroad
- 2003 James Nelson Goodsell Award, Florida International University
- 2003 Caonabo de Oro Award, Dominican Journalist Association

== Books ==
- Trujillo: Death of the Goat, 1978
- Somoza and the Legacy of U.S. Involvement in Central America, 1981
- The Ghosts of Makara: Growing Up Down-Under in a Lost World of Yesteryears, 2002
- Diederich, Bernard; Burt, Al (2005). Papa Doc & the Tontons Macoutes. Introduction by Graham Greene. Princeton, N.J.: Markus Wiener Publishers. ISBN 978-1-55876-290-9. OCLC 493419840.
- Bon Papa, 2007
- The Prize: Haiti's National Palace, 2007
- 1959: The Year that Changed Our World, 2007
- Bon Papa's Golden Years, 2008
- The Price of Blood: History of Repression and Rebellion in Haiti Under Dr François Duvalier, 1957–1962, 2011
- The Murderers Among Us: History of Repression and Rebellion in Haiti Under Dr. François Duvalier, 1962–1971, 2011
- Diederich, Bernard (2012). Seeds of Fiction: Graham Greene's Adventures in Haiti and Central America 1954–1983. London: Peter Owen. ISBN 978-0-7206-1488-6.
