= Modesto Díaz =

Dominican general and soldier of the Cuban Army (1826–1892)

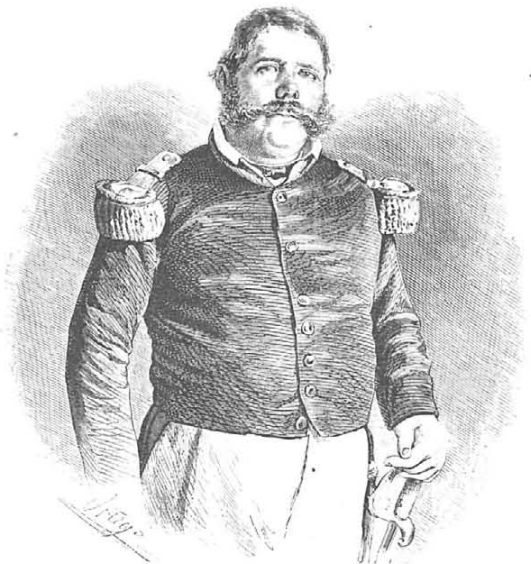
- General Díaz c. 1862
- Born: 1826; Baní, Dominican Republic
- Died: August 28, 1892 (aged 66); Yaguate, Dominican Republic
- Military career
- Allegiance: Spain (1861–1868); Cuba (1868–1878)
- Branch: Army
- Rank: Major General
- Conflicts: Dominican Restoration War; Ten Years' War

Modesto Díaz (1826 – August 28, 1892) was a Dominican Major General of the Cuban Liberation Army. He was a member of the Spanish Army in his country of origin during the Dominican Restoration War (1863–1865). He settled in Cuba and was reinstated to active service after the Carlos Manuel de Céspedes uprising. At the suggestion of Luis Marcano, he went to the side of the Cubans, and conducted several victorious battles against the Spanish during the Ten Years' War (1868–1878).

== Early years ==
He was born in Baní, Dominican Republic, in 1826. In 1861, the country was occupied by Spanish forces, in which Díaz served as member of the Spanish army in his country and came to serve as military chief of the province of San Cristóbal. After the Dominican Restoration War, he arrived in Cuba together with the last military personnel who left the island in 1865, being a Brigadier of the Dominican Reserves in the service of Spain.

== Ten Years' War ==
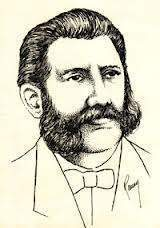
By the end of the 1860's, Díaz began to switch sides to Cuba in the Ten Years' War.

Due to the uprising of October 10, 1868, he was mobilized by the colonial regime and given the mission of defending the Bayamo prison against the Cuban attack on that city, but from the first moments he joined the insurgent forces. Carlos Manuel de Céspedes, Cuba's Father of the Nation, granted him the rank of Lieutenant General. At the head of a group of poorly armed men, he ambushed a Spanish column heading from Manzanillo to Bayamo on the Babatuaba River, forcing it to retreat without achieving its objective of capturing the rebel capital. In November, he attacked the Finca de Chapala, near Jiguaní. A few days later, his military rank was rectified, receiving that of Major General, and he was given command of the forces led by Vicente García González in the territory of Las Tunas. Together with him, he carried out two attacks on the column of the Blas Villate, Count of Valmaceda, when it was advancing from Camagüey to reconquer Bayamo.

In February 1869, he successfully attacked Guisa. On June 9 of the same year, he was named chief of the Bayamo district. In 1870, he fought in Paso del Cauto, took the captaincy of Horno, defeated the San Quintín Battalion in El Macío, occupied the town of Guá, defeated the Spanish in the Battle of Buey and seized Cuartón El Congo.

In 1871, he was replaced in office and in March 1872 he returned to the head of the Bayamo district. In October 1873, he was in charge of the Manzanillo district and in December of that year he was inspector general of the Cuban Liberation Army. On August 15, 1875 he attacked a column in Maniabón, Puerto Padre. In that month he was named head of the First Eastern Corps, but did not take up the post until January 23, 1876.

He accepted the Pact of Zanjón and laid down his arms in Yara, together with the forces of Bayamo in March 1878.

== Death ==
He returned to the Dominican Republic, at some point, living the rest of his life until he died on August 28, 1892, in Yaguate, province of San Cristóbal. He was 66 years old.

== See also ==
- Carlos Manuel de Céspedes
- Máximo Gómez
- Ten Years' War
- Dominican Restoration War

== Sources ==
- Collective of authors of the Center for Military Studies of the FAR (CEMI) Encyclopedic Dictionary of Military History of Cuba. Part One (1510 - 1898). Volume I Biographies. Ediciones Verde Olivo, City of Havana, 2014. Page 97
