= Manuel Vázquez Montalbán =

Spanish novelist (1939–2003)

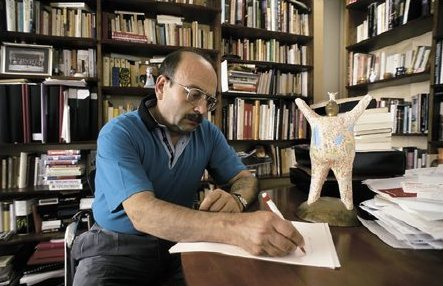
- Born: Manuel Vázquez Montalbán; 14 June 1939; Barcelona, Spain
- Died: 18 October 2003 (aged 64); Bangkok, Thailand
- Citizenship: Spaniard
- Occupation: Author
- Writing career
- Language: Spanish
- Notable work: Pepe Carvalho

Manuel Vázquez Montalbán (14 June 1939–18 October 2003) was a prolific Spanish writer from Barcelona: journalist, novelist, poet, essayist, anthologue, prologist, humorist, critic and political prisoner as well as a gastronome and an FC Barcelona supporter.

== Biography ==
Vázquez Montalbán was born in Barcelona on 14 June 1939. His parents did not register his birth until 27 July; many sources show 27 July or 14 July as his birth date. He studied philosophy at the Autonomous University of Barcelona and was also a member of the Unified Socialist Party of Catalonia. He spent 18 months in prison after participating in a 1962 miner's strike.

He began writing poetry in 1967. He is one of the Novísimos from Jose María Castellet. His poetic works until 1986 are collected in Memoria y deseo ("Memory and desire").

The same characteristic features of his poetry appear in his novels. Los mares del Sur, part of the Pepe Carvalho series, won the Planeta Award in 1979, bringing fame for both the writer and the fictional detective, who would later be portrayed in films, TV series and comic strips. In 1988, he wrote and published a children's book called, Escenas de la Literatura Universal y Retratos de Grandes Autores (English version as "Scenes from World Literature and Portraits of Greatest Authors"), which is illustrated by Willi Glasauer, and published by Círculo de Lectores. This children's book includes fun facts, trivia, and information accompanied by photos and Willi Glasauer's illustrations of the likes of Ramón del Valle-Inclán, Gabriel García Márquez, Hermann Hesse, Agatha Christie, Federico García Lorca, William Shakespeare, Samuel Beckett, Günter Grass, Marguerite Duras, Miguel de Cervantes, Elias Canetti, Johann Wolfgang von Goethe, Albert Camus, Jonathan Swift, Virginia Woolf, Franz Kafka, Doris Lessing, Vladimir Nabokov, Jorge Luis Borges, James Joyce, Jean-Paul Sartre, Thomas Mann, William Faulkner, and Ernest Hemingway.

Other narrative works include narrative productions Galíndez (1991), winner of the National Narrative Award; El estrangulador (The strangler) (1994) and Erec y Enide (Erec and Enide) (2002). In 1992 he published Autobiografía del general Franco, which was awarded the 1994 international prize Premio Internacional de Literatura Ennio Flaiano. He also wrote non-literary works in Catalan, notably L'art del menjar a Catalunya (1977). For many years, he contributed columns and articles to the Madrid-based daily newspaper El País.

In 1974, he wrote the libretto for Salvador Dalí's opera-poem Être Dieu (To Be God), with music by French avant-garde composer Igor Wakhévitch.

He died in Bangkok, Thailand, while returning to his home country from a speaking tour of Australia. His last book, La aznaridad, was published posthumously.

== Detective Carvalho saga ==
The first novel featuring the 50-year-old gastronome-detective Pepe Carvalho is Yo maté a Kennedy (I Killed Kennedy) in 1972, followed by Tatuaje (Tattoo) in 1975 and La soledad del manager (The Angst-Ridden Executive) in 1977.

The rest of the Pepe Carvalho saga is as follows:

- Los mares del Sur (Southern Seas) 1979
- Asesinato en el Comité Central (Murder in the Central Committee) 1981
- Los pájaros de Bangkok (The Birds of Bangkok) 1983
- La rosa de Alejandría (Alexandria's Rose) 1984
- El balneario (The Spa) 1986
- El delantero centro fue asesinado al atardecer (Offside) 1989
- El laberinto griego (The Greek Labyrinth) 1991
- Sabotaje olímpico (Olympic Sabotage) 1993
- El hermano pequeño (The Little Brother) 1994
- El Premio (The Prize) 1996
- Quinteto de Buenos Aires (Buenos Aires Quintet) 1997
- El hombre de mi vida (The Man of My Life) 2000
- Milenio Carvalho (Carvalho Millennium) 2004, edited in two parts.

== Other prose fiction ==
- Recordando a Dardé (in Recordando a Dardé y otros relatos, Seix Barral, 1969, and in Tres novelas ejemplares, Bruguera, 1983, Espasa-Calpe, 1988)
- Happy end, Gaya Ciencia, 1974 (also in Tres novelas ejemplares, Bruguera, 1983, Espasa-Calpe, 1988, and in Escritos subnormales, Seix Barral, 1989, Mondadori, 2000)
- La vida privada del doctor Betriu (in Tres novelas ejemplares, Bruguera, 1983, Espasa-Calpe, 1988)
- El pianista, Círculo de Lectores, 1985, Mondadori, 1996
- El matarife, Almarabu, 1986 (also in Pigmalión y otros relatos, Seix Barral, 1987, Mondadori, 2000)
- Los alegres muchachos de Atzavara, Seix Barral, 1987, Mondadori, 2000
- Pigmalión (in Pigmalión y otros relatos, Seix Barral, 1987, Mondadori, 2000)
- Cuarteto, Mondadori, 1988 and 2001
- Autobiografía del general Franco, Planeta, 1992
- El estrangulador, Mondadori, 1994 and 2000
- O César o nada, Planeta, 1998
- El señor de los bonsáis, Alfaguara, 1999
- Erec y Enide, Planeta, 2002
- Los papeles de Admunsen, Navona, 2023 (posthumous)

== The gastronome ==
Vázquez Montalbán was also a gastronome. Gastronomical references can be found in all the novels of the Pepe Carvalho series, which include some recipes such as the "rice tagliatelle fideuà" that Carvalho prepares in Los pájaros de Bangkok. He displays all his gastronomic knowledge, with erudition and humility, in Contra los Gourmets (Against Gourmets), an initiation in the world of gastronomy. Contra los Gourmets concentrates on Spanish cuisine, but covers international cuisine, traditional cuisine and nouvelle cuisine. He also considers eating fashions such as "healthy food" and "light products". Other gastronomic works by Montalbán are L'art del menjar a Catalunya (Cocina Catalana), Recetas inmorales (Immoral recipes) and Reflexiones de Robinsón ante un bacalao.

== Essays ==
He wrote essays about journalism, politics, sociology, sports, history, cuisine, biographies, literature and music.His first essay, Informe sobre la Información (Report about Information) (1963) is still one of the best studies on journalism ever published in Spain. Some of his other works are:

- Crónica sentimental de España (Sentimental Chronicle of Spain), 1971
- Joan Manuel Serrat, 1972
- El libro gris de Televisión Española (The Grey TV Book), 1973
- Diccionario del Franquismo, (Dictionary of the Franco times) 1977
- Panfleto desde el planeta de los simios (Pamphlet from the Planet of the Apes), 1995
- Un polaco en la corte del rey Juan Carlos (A Pole - meaning a Catalan, here used ironically - in the Court of King Juan Carlos), 1996, an analysis of the political life in Madrid, in the last years of Felipe González's government.
- Y Dios entró en La Habana (And God entered La Habana), 1998, about Cuba, Fidel Castro and the visit of the Pope John Paul II.
- Marcos: el señor de los espejos (Marcos: the Lord of the Mirrors), 1999.
- Geometría y compasión, Mondadori, 2003. ISBN 9788439709657
- La aznaridad, Mondadori, 2003. ISBN 9788439710172
- Fútbol. Una religión en busca de un Dios, Arena Abierta, 2005. ISBN 9788483066119
- Jack el Decorador, De Bolsillo, 2008. ISBN 9788483465356

== Legacy ==
To commemorate him, the FC Barcelona Foundation and the Catalan College of Journalists have awarded the Manuel Vázquez Montalbán International Journalism Award since 2004. The award includes two categories:

- Sport Journalism.
- Cultural and/or Political Journalism.

Italian writer Andrea Camilleri called his main character Salvo Montalbano in honour of him.
