= Ramfis Trujillo =

Dominican dictator and playboy (1929–1969)

- Trujillo in the mid-1950s.

2nd Generalissimo of the Dominican Republic
- In office 1 June – 19 November 1961
- Preceded by: Rafael Trujillo
- Succeeded by: Position abolished, succeeded by President Joaquín Balaguer

Personal details
- Born: Rafael Leónidas Trujillo Martínez; 5 June 1929 Madrid, Spain
- Died: 27 December 1969 (aged 40) Madrid, Spain
- Spouse: Lita Milan (m. 1960)
- Relations: Rafael Trujillo (father); Héctor Trujillo (uncle); Alma McLaughlin (aunt-in-law); Angelita Trujillo (sister); Porfirio Rubirosa (brother-in-law); Ramfis Domínguez-Trujillo (nephew)
- Children: 6

Military service
- Allegiance: Dominican Republic
- Branch/service: Dominican Army
- Rank: General

Rafael Leónidas Trujillo Martínez (5 June 1929 – 27 December 1969), better known as Ramfis Trujillo, was the son of Rafael Leónidas Trujillo, dictator of the Dominican Republic, after whose 1961 assassination he briefly held power. Nominally an army general, he lived a playboy lifestyle similar to his friend and brother-in-law Porfirio Rubirosa. Remembered for his repression of political opponents, he went into exile in Spain, where he died from his injuries 10 days after crashing a sports car.

== Early life ==
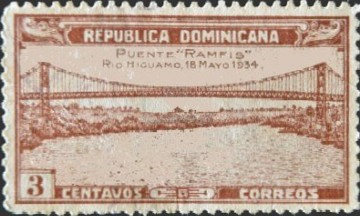
Ramfis Bridge, named in honor of not yet 5-year-old Ramfis Trujillo.

Ramfis was born in 1929, his mother was María de los Angeles Martínez Alba, nicknamed La Españolita "the little Spaniard" as her parents were from Spain. By the age 14, his father Rafael Trujillo had made him a colonel, with equivalent pay and privileges. Some say he received this appointment aged just four and that he had become a brigadier general by the age of nine. He was nicknamed Ramfis after the high priest in Giuseppe Verdi's opera Aida.

In the early 1950s, he married his first wife, Octavia Ricart, they had six children.

In the mid-1950s, he was sent to study at the United States Army Command and General Staff College in Fort Leavenworth, Kansas. While there, and with Rubirosa as his liaison, Trujillo skipped class and took off for Hollywood, eventually embarking on an affair with actress Kim Novak. Trujillo became notorious for buying luxury cars, mink coats, and jewelry for beautiful girls during his stay. Trujillo's flashy gift-giving made the national news and members of the United States Congress were openly questioned by the press about what real use was being made of foreign aid given to the Dominican Republic. At one point a bumper sticker began appearing on the cars of girls in Los Angeles that read: "This Car Is Not A Gift From Trujillo".

Since his attendance at the military school was erratic at best, he was denied his diploma after completion. This fact greatly infuriated, and at the same time, humiliated his father.

When he returned home, his wife Octavia filed for divorce. His behavior forced his father to send him to a sanatorium in Belgium. Dominican historian Bernardo Vega has documented Trujillo's history of mental hospital stays, and Robert Crassweller also wrote about it in his Trujillo's biography. Trujillo received electroshock treatments in Belgium as early as 1958; there were also stays in mental hospitals after that.

Not long after all this, he moved to Paris to resume his socialite lifestyle. Many of these actions have most historians convinced that Trujillo never wanted to be a ruler like his father and that he just wanted to live the carefree and bon vivant life of a playboy, shunning any sort of responsibility. Lita Milan (née Iris Lia Menshell) became his second official wife during these years. She was an American of Hungarian immigrant parents, who had a short but relatively successful film career in Hollywood, most notably in The Left Handed Gun, opposite Paul Newman. They had two children.

== Influential years ==
On 30 May 1961, Rafael Trujillo was assassinated in a plot to end his 31-year rule. Ramfis quickly returned to the country and, with the help of Johnny Abbes García, the ruthless intelligence chief, brutally repressed any elements believed to be connected with his father's death, murdering many of the suspects himself.

Afterward, he and puppet president Joaquín Balaguer took some steps to open up the regime. Ramfis eased his father's harsh censorship of the press, and also granted some civil liberties. However, these concessions were rejected as insufficient by a people whose only memories had been the Trujillo era, rather than the decades of poverty and instability which had preceded it (bankruptcy in 1902–1905, civil war in 1911—12 & 1914, U.S. occupation in 1916–1924). At the same time, even these meager reforms were opposed by the hardline trujillistas gathered around Ramfis' uncles.

Both internal and external pressures forced him into exile late in 1961, when he fled back to France, along with all of the surviving Trujillos, aboard the famed yacht Angelita (still sailing today as the cruise ship Sea Cloud), with his father's casket, which was allegedly lined with $4 million (equivalent to $32 million in 2024) in cash, jewels and important papers.

In 1962, he settled down in Spain where he was protected by Generalisimo Francisco Franco. There he continued with his jet-set lifestyle, which included flying planes as a hobby.

He died on 27 December 1969 in a Spanish hospital due to complications from pneumonia after being severely injured in a car crash ten days earlier in the outskirts of Madrid. The person in the car he hit, Teresa Bertrán de Lis, the Duchess-consort of Alburquerque, died instantly. Trujillo was initially buried in Madrid's Almudena cemetery, but his remains were subsequently moved to Mingorrubio Cemetery in El Pardo to accompany his father's remains. Trujillo was driving a Ferrari 330GT sports car (s/n 9151), a blue 2-door purchased in 1966. The car sat unrestored in Spain from 1969 and finally was offered for sale in early 2013 for £50,000.

Ramfis Trujillo's children and grandchildren are still alive, some of them living in Spain.
