= Antonio de la Maza =

Dominican Republic businessman, oppositor to the Trujillo dictatorship and conspirator

Antonio de la Maza (May 24, 1912 – June 4, 1961) was a Dominican businessman based in Santo Domingo. He was an opponent of Rafael Trujillo, and was one of the principal conspirators in the assassination of the aforementioned dictator which took place on May 30, 1961.

== Life ==
De la Maza was born in Moca, Espaillat. His family had ties to Horacio Vásquez who was ousted by Trujillo when he started his reign in 1930. After attending the Corps of Military Aides, De la Maza became manager of a Trujillo-owned sawmill near Restauracion. In the context of the 1956 Galindez case, his brother, Octavio, was used as a scapegoat by Trujillo's henchmen; he was presented to the American Government as the murderer of Gerry Murphy and killed.

During the assassination De la Maza left Juan Tomás Díaz's .45 automatic pistol at the scene, a complication that facilitated the Servicio de Inteligencia Militar's work as they could identify the owner. A few days later De la Maza and General Juan Tomás Díaz were killed in a gun battle with the SIM after coming out of hiding.

Ancestors of Antonio de la Maza

8. Ambrosio de la Maza
4. Blas de la Maza Acosta; Cuba
9. Gertrudis Acosta
2. Vicente de la Maza Rosario (1879–1967); Moca, Dominican Republic
5. Matilde Rosario
1. Antonio de la Maza Vásquez (1912–1961); Moca, Dominican Republic
12. Eulogio Vásquez
6. Ernesto Vásquez Rivas
13. Amalia Rivas
3. Ernestina Vásquez y Vásquez (1888–1935); Moca, Dominican Republic
28. Ramón Vásquez (†1860); Spain
14. Basilio Vásquez Lizardo (1832–?); Moca, Cibao Department, Haiti (Haitian annexation of Santo Domingo)
29. María Lizardo Caba (†1860); Moca, Colony of Santo Domingo
7. Hortensia Vásquez Lajara; Moca, Dominican Republic
30. Pedro Lajara; Azua, Colony of Santo Domingo
15. Ramona Lajara Gómez (†1884); Moca, Cibao Department, Haiti
31. Tomasa Gómez
