= Georges Khabbaz =

Lebanese actor and filmmaker

Georges Khabbaz جورج خباز
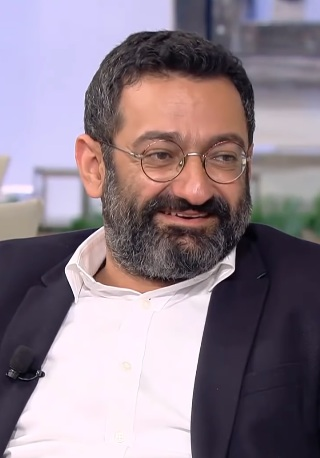
- Georges Khabbaz in 2020
- Born: 5 December 1976 (age 49); Hasbaya, Lebanon
- Occupations: Actor and Theater Professor
- Years active: 1991-present
- Height: 167 cm (5 ft 6 in)
- Website: www.georgeskhabbaz.com

Georges Khabbaz (Arabic: جورج خبّاز; born 5 November 1976) is a Lebanese actor and theater professor.

He is best known for playing the lead role in Under the Bombs (2007) and Silina. He is also known for writing Ghadi (2013), in which he also played the lead role, and Waynon (2014).

== Early life ==
Khabbaz was born into a family of artists. His father, Georges Joubran Khabbaz, has starred in plays like Sahriyyi for Ziad Rahbani and has appeared on television in Les Miserables and Youth 73. His mother Odette Atiyyeh is also a theatre person, frequently performing at local festivals.

Georges Khabbaz studied at the Holy Spirit University of Kaslik where he obtained a degree in musical comedy. He was four years old when he first appeared on stage in a school play called The Life of St. Maron. Professionally, his theatre career began in 1994.

== Career ==
=== Films ===
In 2006, Georges Khabbaz starred with Nada Abou Farhat in the film Under the Bombs (or Sous Les Bombes) directed by Philippe Aractingi. The film, which used "real shots of the war and of the horrors it created among the civilian population", follows a Muslim woman as she tries to find her son in the immediate aftermath of the 2006 Lebanon War, accompanied by a Christian taxi driver named Georges Khabbaz. London Evening Standard reviewer Derek Malcolm praised Georges Khabbaz's performance as "excellent". However, Time Out London reviewer Dave Calhoun described the film as "deeply flawed". The film was one of 16 out of 983 submissions to be selected for screening at the 2008 Sundance Film Festival in the World Cinema Dramatic Competition. Khabbaz was awarded Best Actor in a Feature at the 8th Annual Rotterdam Film Festival for the role. Alain Spira wrote in Paris Match on May 5, 2008, that Georges Khabbaz the star in his country is "literally Al Pacinesque."

The 2008 film Silina, directed by Hatem Ali, saw Khabbaz together with Duraid Lahham and Myriam Fares in a film retelling of the operetta Hala and the King (originally by Mansour and Assi Rahbani). Khabbaz plays the King of Silina, who is tricked by his entourage. This results in him proposing marriage to a rich woman, believing her to be the princess he is destined to marry.

In 2012 Khabbaz wrote and starred in the film Ghadi directed by Amin Dora and produced by The Talkies. In a small coastal town, Leba Georges Khabbaz a music instructor marries his childhood sweetheart Lara. Medical tests show that his newborn has unique needs. The townspeople are quickly rejecting the tiny Ghadi. Leba and his friends must find a way to convince his neighbours to accept his young son. Their solution is genius, heartwarming and redemptive. The Hollywood Reporter said, "The polished production and adamant view of a better human nature make Ghadi hard to resist." Dora and Khabbaz have delivered a sly and absorbing comedy whose particular resonance for Arab viewers never undercuts its essential appeal to a potentially broad array of audiences. Ghadi was selected to represent Lebanon in the foreign-language Oscar race 2015 (it was initially chosen last year but opened too late at home to qualify). Ghadi won the Audience Award at the International Film Festival Mannheim-Heidelberg 2014, the KNN Audience Award at the International Busan Film Festival 2014, the Audience Award at the Arabian Sights Film Festival Washington 2014, the Best Fiction and Best Actor at La Nuit Des Mabrouk 2014 and the Best Lebanese Movie and Best Cinema Actor at Murex d'Or 2013.

In 2013 Khabbaz wrote the film Waynon (Void) produced by NDU University, which is a film that portrays the tragedy of the Lebanese Civil War.

Waynon has participated in many festivals worldwide and received numerous international awards such as the Special Jury Award at the Alexandria International Film Festival Egypt 2014, Best Feature at Silk Road Film Festival 2014, Official Selection at Dubai International Film Festival 2013 and Best Screenplay at Malmö Arab Film Festival 2014.

=== Theater ===
- 2005: Msibe Jdideh - مصيبة جديدة (New Calamity)
- 2006: Kezzeb Kbir - كذاب كبير (Big Liar)
- 2007: Hala2 Wa2ta - هلٌق وقتا (It's Time)
- 2008: Chou El Adieh? - شو القضيٌة (What's the Case?)
- 2009: 3al Tari2 - عالطريق ( On the Way )
- 2010: Le Professeur - البروفيسور (The Professor)
- 2011: Matloub - مطلوب (Wanted)
- 2012: El Awwal Bel Saf - الأٌول بالصف (The First in Class)
- 2013: Mech Mekhtelfin - مش مختلفين (We're not Different)
- 2014: Natrino - ناطرينو (Waiting For Him)
- 2014: Rafka - رفقا (Rafka Musical)
- 2014-2015: Wara El Beb - ورا الباب (Behind The Door)
- 2015: Ma3 El Wa2t ... Yemkin - مع الوقت... يمكن(With Time... Maybe)
- 2016: Bel Kawalis - بالكواليس (At The Backstage)
- 2017-2018: Ella Eza - ...إلّا إذا (Unless...)
- 2019: Yawmyet Masrahje - يوميات مسرحجي (The Diaries of a Theater Actor)
- 2024: Khyel Sahra - خيال صحرا (The shadow of a desert)

== Awards ==
- Khabbaz has won the Murex d'Or award several times: in 2004 for the top sitcom Abdo w Abdo, in 2006 for an outstanding theatrical play in (Kezzeb Kbir), in 2008 for the outstanding polyvalent artist.,[1] in 2011 for leading actor in (To Yara) and in 2013 for acclaimed cinema actor in Ghadi.
- Best Actor at Rotterdam Film Festival 2008 for his role in Under the Bombs.
- Best Play "Kezzeb Kbir" at Festival de Molière - Paris 2007.
- Best Actor at La Nuit Des Mabrouk 2014 for his role in Ghadi.
- Honorary doctorate degree from USEK-2024
