= Kurdish theatre in Turkey =

Kurdish theatre is theatre including Kurdish themes and or the Kurdish language. Early figures in supporting the Kurdish theatre can be seen in Mehdi Zana from Diyarbakir and the Theatre Companies in Istanbul. In Turkey, the existence of Kurds was denied and their language banned for many years.

== Early beginnings in 1960s – 1970s ==
In 1965 the first Kurdish play, Birîna Reş (Black wound) was published, it was written by the at the time imprisoned author and poet Musa Anter. To organize a theatre tour in the Kurdish language was attempted during the Eastern Meetings in the late 1960s, when Mehdi Zana requested the play Before the Ice Melts (Turkish: Buzlar Çözülmeden) of Cevat Fehmi Baskut to be performed with Mamoste Celil in four villages. The plan was not executed. Also in the late 1960s in events hosted by the Revolutionary Cultural Eastern Hearths short Kurdish language sketches were performed. In 1970s, while acting as chairman of the local branch of the Workers' Party of Turkey (TIP) Zana would support the formation of a Theatre Group in Silvan, Diyarbakir in order to raise awareness on the Kurdishness of the people. A play that included Kurdish themes, Kurdish songs and phrases was Deprem ve Zülüm (Earthquake and Cruelty) on the earthquake in Muradiye of 1976, staged at the Ankara Revolutionary Art Theater (DAST). Kemal Burkay wrote the only known and also performed theatre play in the Kurdish language before the military coup of 1980. It was Dawiya Dehaq (The Fall of Dehak) and was staged on Newroz 1978 by a theatre group linked to the Socialist Party of Kurdistan. The play was performed until 1980 in the Dilan Cinema in Dyarbakir but was also staged cities like Ceyhan, Adana or Istanbul.

== 1980s ==
After the language ban, an underground theatre culture emerged in Istanbul around Mamoste Celil, one of the prominent names of Kurdish theatre. From 1985 onwards, Celil and others acted in events in private houses. Those events were held in secret and during the theater performances fairy tales in the Kurdish language were told to children in room beside the stage. Before the actuations, Kurdish songs and anthems were sung by spectators. The plays to be performed at the next event would be discussed at the end of each theater play. The underground theater group was able to organize such events for about 5 years.

== 1990s ==
After the ban on the Kurdish language was alleviated in 1991, the Mesopotamia Culture Center (Kurdish: Navenda Çanda Mezopotamya, NÇM; Turkish: Mezopotamya Kültür Merkezi, MKM) in Istanbul. The art departments director was Mamoste Celil. A theater school was created and the rehearsals were held in the centers basements. Misko (Mouse) was the first play of the group and performed at the Ortaköy community center in Istanbul. After a theater festival in Adana before five-thousand spectators, the theater group Teatra Jiyana Nû (Theatre New Life, TJN) was established. Throughout the 1990s the MKM expanded its activities and founded branches in Izmir, Adana, or Mersin. In each of these cities a local theatre company was established as well. At the inauguration of MKMs Urfa branch in October 1997, the TJN performed the play Guşto. In the late 1990s the police executed raids on Kurdish theaters and the venues in Istanbul and Adana were closed down. Following the TJN organized a theatre tour with their play Bridge of Culture with stops in over ten cities in Germany.

=== In Kurdish provinces ===
In the Kurdish provinces, Kurdish theatre culture was experienced in clandestinity during the state of emergency. By 1998, plays were rehearsed and performed in the basements of what would become the Diyarbakir branch of the Mesopotamia Culture Center. Performances were also held, but actors often concealed their faces due to the prohibition of Kurdish theater. When the pro-Kurdish DEHAP won the local elections in 1999, the Diyarbakir Municipality Theatre (DBŞT) was reopened (closed by the Refah Party in 1995).

== 2000s ==
Several actors trained by the MKM founded independent theatre companies such as the first private Kurdish Theatre company Seyr-î Mesel in 2003. Seyr-î Mesel became well known in Turkey and Iraqi Kurdistan and also performed in the Zaza language. In 2003 also Avesta was established, which toured Turkey and Sweden with the play Diary of a Madman by Nikolai Gogol for four years. Later plays included Kurdish adaptions of Harold Pinter's Mountain Language, or You Are Not Gara by Aziz Nesin.

In Kurdish provinces, legal Kurdish theatre was possible only after the state of emergency was liftet. In 2003, the first theatre play in the Kurdish language was performed at the DBŞT. It was Taziye from Murathan Mungan.

== 2010s ==
In Hakkari the Feqiyê Teyran Arts and Culture Centre which included a theatre group was founded in 2010. In Batman a city theater was established in 2012. In 2009 the Turkish Ministry of Culture supported a Kurdish play for the first time also financially. Subsequently, the theater company Destar received governmental subsidies until it was accused of supporting the Gezi Park protests. In February 2012 a Kurdish translation of William Shakespeare's Hamlet by Kawa Nemir, was staged in the Netherlands within the framework of the 400 year celebration of diplomatic relations between Turkey and the Netherlands. Hamlet was translated by Kawa Nemir and performed by the Diyarbakir Municipality Theatre under the direction of Celil Toksöz from the Dutch Theater Rast. The Kurdish adaption also included Dengbêjs as narrators. After the failed military coup of 2016 the situation for Kurdish theatre turned dire as most of the arrested actors were Kurdish and the Government shut down the three city theaters in Diyarbakir, Hakkari and Batman which all staged plays in the Kurdish language. In Diyarbakir the dismissed actors then founded the Amed City Theatre with which they organized several performances starting from 2017 with Dawiya Dawi (Finally).
