= Simshar =

Simshar can refer to:

- Simshar incident, a ship explosion incident off the eastern coast of Malta
- Simshar (film), a 2014 Maltese film based on the above
