= List of submissions to the 87th Academy Awards for Best Foreign Language Film =

2014 Best Foreign Language Film submissions
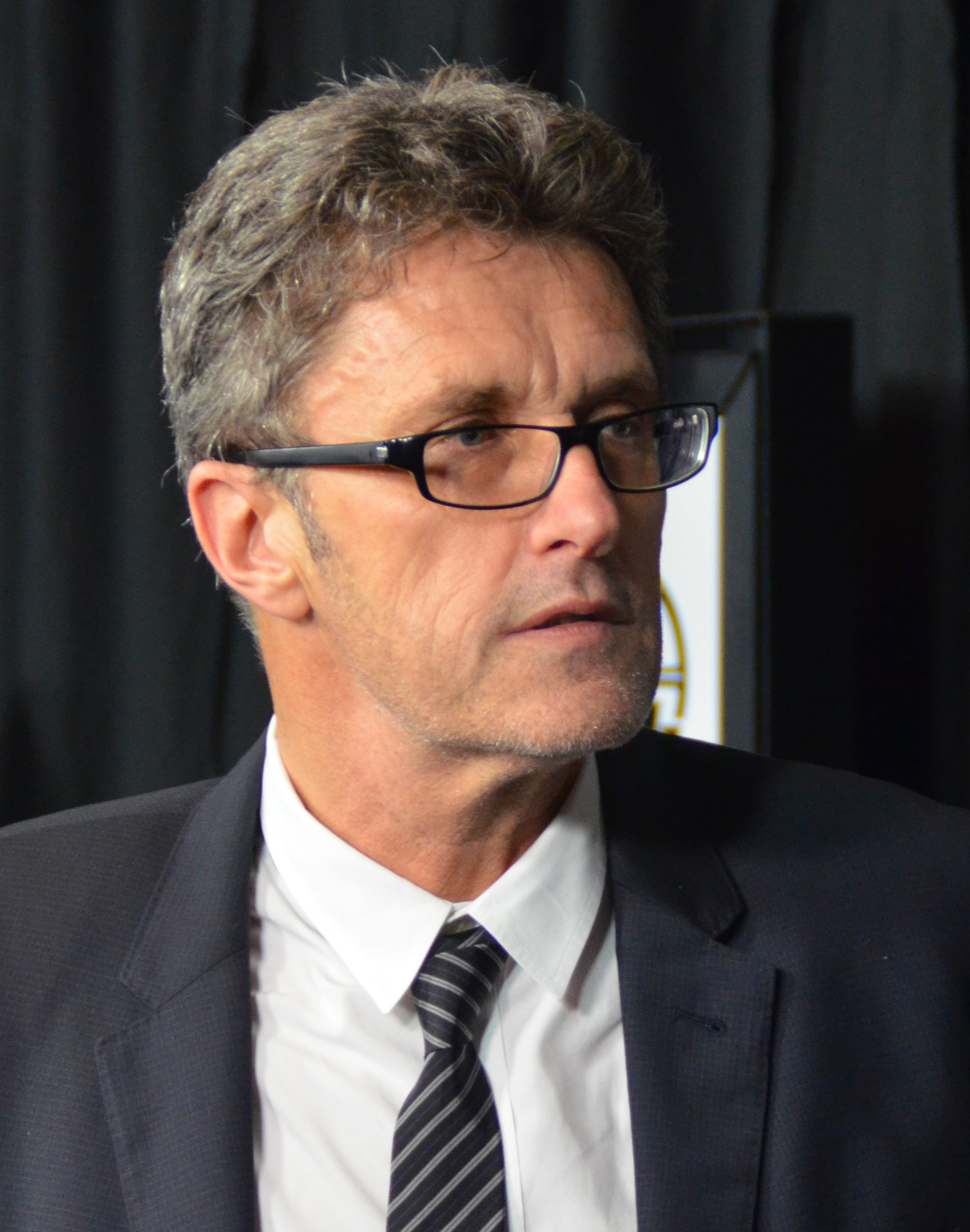
- Paweł Pawlikowski directed Ida, which won the year's award.

Highlights
- Oscar winner: (Poland) Ida
- Submissions: 83
- Debuts: 4
- Total eligible: 76

This is a list of submissions to the 87th Academy Awards for the Best Foreign Language Film. The Academy of Motion Picture Arts and Sciences (AMPAS) has invited the film industries of various countries to submit their best film for the Academy Award for Best Foreign Language Film every year since the award was created in 1956. The award is presented annually by the Academy to a feature-length motion picture produced outside the United States that contains primarily non-English dialogue. The Foreign Language Film Award Committee oversees the process and reviews all the submitted films.

For the 87th Academy Awards, the submitted motion pictures must have first been released theatrically in their respective countries between 1 October 2013 and 30 September 2014. The deadline for submissions to the Academy 1 October 2014. 83 countries submitted films, and 76 were found to be eligible by AMPAS and screened for voters. Kosovo, Malta, Mauritania, and Panama submitted films for the first time. After the 9-film shortlist was announced on 19 December 2014, the five nominees were announced on 15 January 2015.

Poland won the award for the first time with Ida by Paweł Pawlikowski, which was also nominated for Best Cinematography. For the first time, the director's name would be engraved on the Oscar statuette in addition to the country name.

== Submissions ==
Submitting country	Film title used in nomination	Original title	Language(s)	Director(s)	Result
Afghanistan	A Few Cubic Meters of Love	چند متر مکعب عشق	Persian, Dari	Jamshid Mahmoudi	Not nominated
Argentina	Wild Tales	Relatos salvajes	Spanish	Damián Szifrón	Nominated
Australia	Charlie's Country		Mandjalpiŋu, English	Rolf de Heer	Not nominated
Austria	The Dark Valley	Das finstere Tal	South Tyrolean German, German, English	Andreas Prochaska	Not nominated
Azerbaijan	Nabat		Azerbaijani, Turkish	Elchin Musaoglu	Not nominated
Bangladesh	Glow of the Firefly	জোনাকির আলো	Bengali	Khalid Mahmud Mithu	Not nominated
Belgium	Two Days, One Night	Deux jours, une nuit	French, Arabic	Jean-Pierre and Luc Dardenne	Not nominated
Bolivia	Forgotten	Olvidados	Spanish	Carlos Bolado	Not nominated
Bosnia and Herzegovina	With Mum	Sa mamom	Bosnian	Faruk Lončarević	Not nominated
Brazil	The Way He Looks	Hoje Eu Quero Voltar Sozinho	Brazilian Portuguese	Daniel Ribeiro	Not nominated
Bulgaria	Bulgarian Rhapsody	Българска Рапсодия	Bulgarian, German, Judaeo-Spanish	Ivan Nitchev	Not nominated
Canada	Mommy		French, Joual, English	Xavier Dolan	Not nominated
Chile	To Kill a Man	Matar a un hombre	Spanish	Alejandro Fernández Almendras	Not nominated
China	The Nightingale	夜莺	Mandarin, Southwestern Mandarin, French	Philippe Muyl	Not nominated
Colombia	Mateo		Spanish	María Gamboa	Not nominated
Costa Rica	Red Princesses	Princesas rojas	Spanish	Laura Astorga	Not nominated
Croatia	Cowboys	Kauboji	Croatian	Tomislav Mršić	Not nominated
Cuba	Behavior	Conducta	Spanish	Ernesto Daranas	Not nominated
Czech Republic	Fair Play		Czech	Andrea Sedláčková	Not nominated
Denmark	Sorrow and Joy	Sorg og glæde	Danish	Nils Malmros	Not nominated
Dominican Republic	Cristo Rey		Spanish, Haitian Creole	Leticia Tonos	Not nominated
Ecuador	Silence in Dreamland	Silencio en la tierra de los sueños	Spanish	Tito Molina	Not nominated
Egypt	Factory Girl	فتاة المصنع	Arabic	Mohamed Khan	Not nominated
Estonia	Tangerines	Mandariinid / მანდარინები	Estonian, Russian, Georgian	Zaza Urushadze	Nominated
Ethiopia	Difret	ድፍረት	Amharic	Zeresenay Berhane Mehari	Not nominated
Finland	Concrete Night	Betoniyö	Finnish	Pirjo Honkasalo	Not nominated
France	Saint Laurent		French, English	Bertrand Bonello	Not nominated
Georgia	Corn Island	სიმინდის კუნძული	Abkhaz, Georgian, Russian	Giorgi Ovashvili	Made shortlist
Germany	Beloved Sisters	Die geliebten Schwestern	German, French	Dominik Graf	Not nominated
Greece	Little England	Μικρά Αγγλία	Greek	Pantelis Voulgaris	Not nominated
Hong Kong	The Golden Era	黃金時代	Mandarin, Cantonese	Ann Hui	Not nominated
Hungary	White God	Fehér isten	Hungarian, English	Kornél Mundruczó	Not nominated
Iceland	Life in a Fishbowl	Vonarstræti	Icelandic, English	Baldvin Zophoníasson	Not nominated
India	Liar's Dice	लायर्स डाइस	Hindi, Chitkuli Kinnauri	Geetu Mohandas	Not nominated
Indonesia	Soekarno		Indonesian, Dutch, Javanese, Bengkulu Malay, Minangkabau, Sundanese	Hanung Bramantyo	Not nominated
Iran	Today	امروز	Persian	Reza Mirkarimi	Not nominated
Iraq	Mardan	مەردان	Central Kurdish	Batin Ghobadi	Not nominated
Ireland	The Gift	An Bronntanas	Irish, English, Polish	Tommy Collins	Not nominated
Israel	Gett: The Trial of Viviane Amsalem	גט - המשפט של ויויאן אמסאלם	Hebrew, French, Judeo-Moroccan Arabic	Ronit Elkabetz and Shlomi Elkabetz	Not nominated
Italy	Human Capital	Il capitale umano	Italian	Paolo Virzì	Not nominated
Japan	The Light Shines Only There	そこのみにて光輝く	Hokkaido Japanese	Mipo O	Not nominated
Kosovo	Three Windows and a Hanging	Tri dritare dhe një varje	Albanian	Isa Qosja	Not nominated
Kyrgyzstan	Kurmanjan Datka: Queen of the Mountains	Курманжан Датка	Kyrgyz, Russian	Sadyk Sher-Niyaz	Not nominated
Latvia	Rocks in My Pockets	Akmeņi manās kabatās	Latvian	Signe Baumane	Not nominated
Lebanon	Ghadi	غدي	Arabic	Amin Dora	Not nominated
Lithuania	The Gambler	Lošėjas	Lithuanian	Ignas Jonynas	Not nominated
Luxembourg	Never Die Young		French	Pol Cruchten	Not nominated
(North Macedonia) Macedonia	To the Hilt	До балчак	Macedonian, French, English, Turkish	Stole Popov	Not nominated
Malta	Simshar		Maltese, English	Rebecca Cremona	Not nominated
Mauritania	Timbuktu		Arabic, English, French, Tamasheq, Bambara, Koyra Chiini	Abderrahmane Sissako	Nominated
Mexico	Cantinflas		Spanish, English	Sebastian del Amo	Not nominated
Moldova	The Unsaved	La limita de jos a cerului	Moldavian Romanian	Igor Cobileanski	Not nominated
Montenegro	The Kids from the Marx and Engels Street	Dječaci iz ulice Marksa i Engelsa	Montenegrin	Nikola Vukčević	Not nominated
Morocco	The Red Moon	القمر الأحمر / La lune rouge	Arabic	Hassan Benjelloun	Not nominated
Nepal	Jhola	झोला	Nepali	Yadavkumar Bhattarai	Not nominated
Netherlands	Accused	Lucia de B.	Dutch	Paula van der Oest	Made shortlist
New Zealand	The Dead Lands		Māori	Toa Fraser	Not nominated
Norway	1001 Grams	1001 gram	Norwegian, French, English	Bent Hamer	Not nominated
Pakistan	Dukhtar	دختر	Urdu, Pashto	Afia Nathaniel	Not nominated
Palestine	Eyes of a Thief	عيون الحراميه	Arabic, Hebrew	Najwa Najjar	Not nominated
Panama	Invasion	Invasión	Spanish	Abner Benaim	Not nominated
Peru	The Gospel of the Flesh	El evangelio de la carne	Spanish	Eduardo Mendoza de Echave	Not nominated
Philippines	Norte, the End of History	Norte, Hangganan ng Kasaysayan	Filipino, English	Lav Diaz	Not nominated
Poland	Ida		Polish, French, Latin	Paweł Pawlikowski	Won Academy Award
Portugal	What Now? Remind Me	E Agora? Lembra-me	Portuguese	Joaquim Pinto	Not nominated
Romania	The Japanese Dog	Câinele japonez	Romanian, Japanese	Tudor Cristian Jurgiu	Not nominated
Russia	Leviathan	Левиафан	Russian	Andrey Zvyagintsev	Nominated
Serbia	See You in Montevideo	Монтевидео, видимо се!	Serbian, English, French, Spanish	Dragan Bjelogrlić	Not nominated
Singapore	My Beloved Dearest	Sayang Disayang	Malay, Indonesian	Sanif Olek	Not nominated
Slovakia	A Step into the Dark	Krok do tmy	Slovak	Miloslav Luther	Not nominated
Slovenia	Seduce Me	Zapelji me	Slovene	Marko Šantić	Not nominated
South Africa	Elelwani		Venda	Ntshavheni wa Luruli	Not nominated
South Korea	Haemoo	해무	Korean	Shim Sung-bo	Not nominated
Spain	Living Is Easy with Eyes Closed	Vivir es fácil con los ojos cerrados	Spanish, English	David Trueba	Not nominated
Sweden	Force Majeure	Turist	Swedish, English, French, Norwegian, Italian	Ruben Östlund	Made shortlist
Switzerland	The Circle	Der Kreis	Swiss German, German, French	Stefan Haupt	Not nominated
Taiwan	Ice Poison	冰毒	Southwestern Mandarin, Burmese	Midi Z	Not nominated
Thailand	The Teacher's Diary	คิดถึงวิทยา	Thai, Lanna	Nithiwat Tharathorn	Not nominated
Turkey	Winter Sleep	Kış Uykusu	Turkish, English	Nuri Bilge Ceylan	Not nominated
Ukraine	The Guide	Поводир	Ukrainian, Russian, English	Oles Sanin	Not nominated
United Kingdom	Little Happiness	Uzun Yol	Turkish	Nihat Seven	Not nominated
Uruguay	Mr. Kaplan		Spanish, Yiddish	Álvaro Brechner	Not nominated
Venezuela	The Liberator	Libertador	Spanish, English, French	Alberto Arvelo	Made shortlist

== Notes ==
- Lebanon initially selected Ghadi by Amin Dora as their entry for the 86th Academy Awards in a two-way race over Blind Intersections by Lara Saba. When the film's release date was moved from 26 September 2013 to 31 October 2013, it no longer met the eligibility dates and Blind Intersections was submitted instead.
- In May 2014, Nigeria announced that AMPAS had approved the first-ever Nigerian Oscar selection committee and they would make their first Oscar submission; however, they did not submit a film by the deadline.
