= International Filmfestival Mannheim-Heidelberg =

Annual film festival

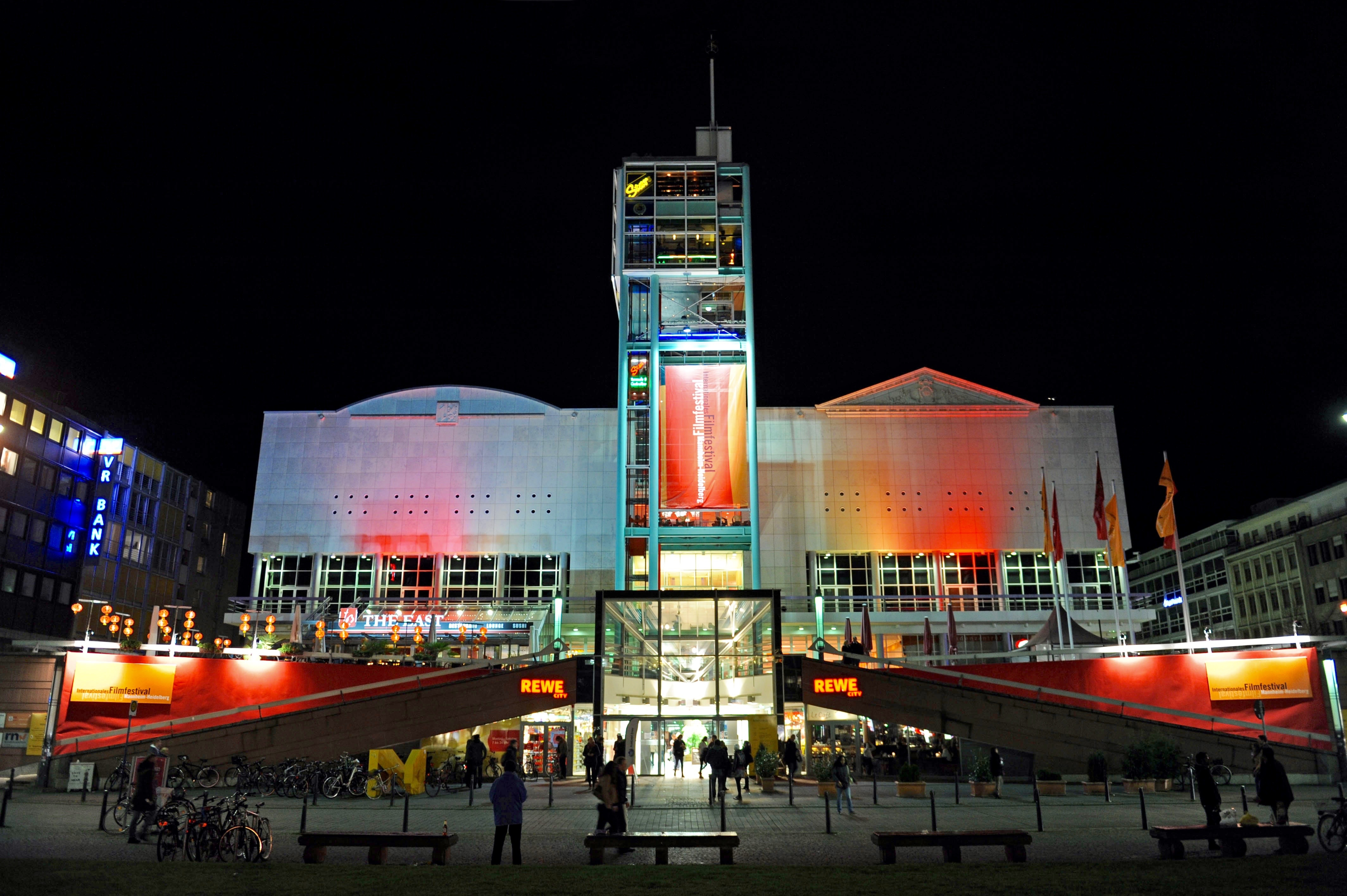
- Stadthaus N1 in Mannheim, the main festival venue, pictured here in 2014 for the 63rd IFFMH
- Location: Mannheim and Heidelberg, Germany
- Founded: 1952
- Awards: International Newcomer Award Mannheim-Heidelberg
- Artistic director: Sascha Keilholz
- Website: iffmh.de

The Mannheim-Heidelberg International Film Festival (German: Internationales Filmfestival Mannheim-Heidelberg), often referred to by the German-language initialism IFFMH, is an annual film festival established in 1952 hosted jointly by the cities of Mannheim and Heidelberg in Baden-Württemberg, the southwest region of Germany.

The festival focuses on arthouse and auteur cinema produced by international newcomer directors, and historically it served as a springboard for many experimental filmmakers from cinemas that have been overlooked by Western audiences. It is the second-oldest film festival in Germany, behind only the Berlinale. Originally held in Mannheim, since 1994 is co-hosted by Mannheim and Heidelberg, two neighboring cities which are less than 20 kilometers away from each other. The festival usually takes places in October or November.

The last edition, the 70th IFFMH, was held in November 2021, and the next edition is scheduled to take place on 17–27 November 2022.

== Background ==
The International Filmfestival Mannheim-Heidelberg is aimed at industry professionals as well as cinema enthusiasts, with about 300 professional participants and approximately 50,000 visitors each year, it is one of the largest film festivals in Germany. After several screenings there are public panel discussions with the film's representatives (e. g. directors, actors or producers).

The festival presents films of independent newcomer directors and who are internationally widely-unknown, focussing on arthouse and auteur films. The films selected must be premieres and thus films screened at Cannes, Locarno, Venice and any German festival are excluded for the International Competition.

In 2010, the MANNHEIM MEETING PLACE was launched. The project succeeds the Festival's former co-production market MANNHEIM MEETINGS, focusing on the improvement of marketing opportunities of completed film projects. However, co-production meetings will still take place.

During the history of the festival, feature films by now-famous directors such as François Truffaut, Helke Sander, Rainer Werner Fassbinder, Kalthoum Bornaz, Jim Jarmusch, Béla Tarr, Shelley Saywell, Atom Egoyan, Krzysztof Kieślowski, Bryan Singer, Guillaume Nicloux, Lou Ye, Rafi Pitts, Thomas Vinterberg, Derek Cianfrance, Luca Guadagnino and Rahmin Bahrani were first introduced to an international public at the festival.

== Competition and awards ==
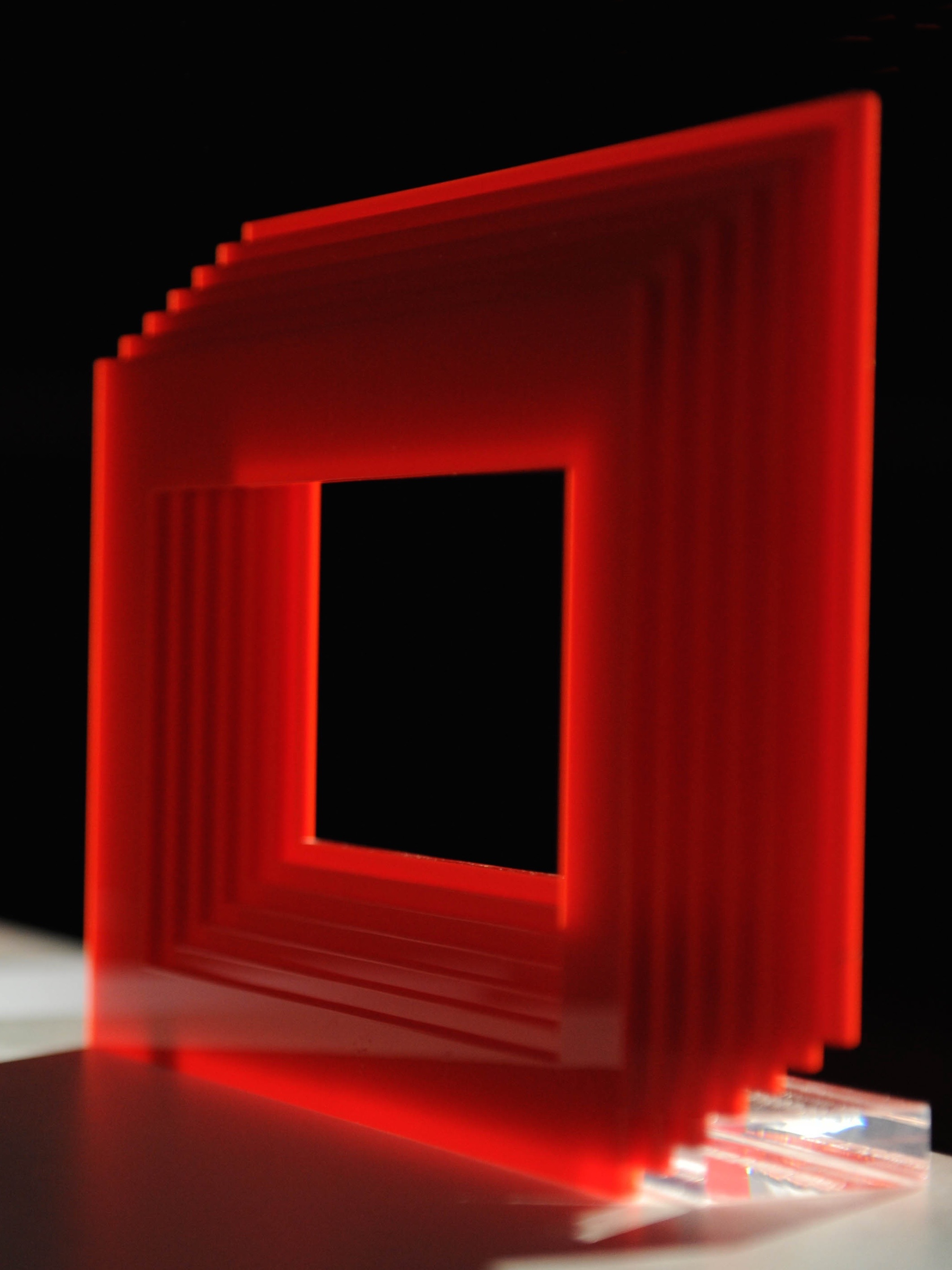
The main award of the International Filmfestival Mannheim-Heidelberg

- Grand Newcomer Award Mannheim-Heidelberg for the best fiction feature film with a minimum length of 70 minutes.
- Talent Award Mannheim-Heidelberg for the best unconventionally narrated feature film with a minimum length of 70 minutes. The prize can not be awarded ex aequo.
- Special Jury Award of Mannheim-Heidelberg for a film with the minimum length of 70 minutes, or for an extraordinary performance as actor, writer, director etc. This prize can be awarded twice if required.
- Special Mentions of Mannheim-Heidelberg for a memorial film or special achievements like acting, photography, music, and montage. Up to three special mentions can be awarded.
- The International Film Critics Prize given by the FIPRESCI Jury for a film of the competition.
- Prize of the Ecumenical Jury given by the Ecumenical Jury for a film of the competition.
- Audience Award of Mannheim-Heidelberg for the film most liked by the Festival audience, regardless of genre and length.
- Recommendations of the Jury of Cinema Owners for a film of the competition which should be released theatrically in Germany.
- Rainer Werner Fassbinder Award – Best Screenplay given by the jury for the best screenplay in the competition.

=== Master of Cinema Award ===
In addition, since 1998 in sporadic intervals, the honorary Master of Cinema Award is issued to outstanding cineastic artist:

- 2017 – István Szabó
- 2015 – Olivier Assayas
- 2009 – Atom Egoyan
- 2006 – Aleksandr Sokurov
- 2004 – Wim Wenders, Edgar Reitz
- 2003 – Raoul Ruiz
- 2002 – Zhang Yimou
- 1999 – Otar Iosseliani
- 1998 – Theo Angelopoulos

=== New Master of Cinema Award ===
In addition, since 2013, the honorary New Master of Cinema Award is issued:

- 2014 – Geoffrey Enthoven
- 2013 – Frédéric Fonteyne

== List of award winners ==
=== 2021 ===
- Grand Newcomer Award Mannheim-Heidelberg Il Buco, Michelangelo Frammartino, Italy
- Rainer Werner Fassbinder Award – Best Screenplay Zero Fucks Given, Julie Lecoustre and Emmanuel Marre, France/Belgium
- Rainer Werner Fassbinder Award – Best Screenplay – Special Mention Haruhara-san's Recorder, Kyoshi Sugita, Japan
- FIPRESCI International Film Critics' Prize The Sleeping Negro, Skinner Myers, USA
- Prize of the Ecumenical Jury My Night, Antoinette Boulat, France/Belgium
- Award of the Student Jury The First Fallen, Rodrigo de Oliveira, Brazil
- Audience Award The First Fallen, Rodrigo de Oliveira, Brazil

=== 2020 ===
- Grand Newcomer Award Mannheim-Heidelberg My Mexican Breztel, Nuria Giménez Lorang, Spain
- Rainer Werner Fassbinder Award – Best Screenplay Single Cycle, Zhang Qi, China
- Rainer Werner Fassbinder Award – Best Screenplay – Special Mentions Come Closer, Saskia Walker and Ralf Walker, Germany; Beginning, Dea Kulumbegashvili, Georgia/France
- FIPRESCI International Film Critics' Prize My Mexican Breztel, Nuria Giménez Lorang, Spain
- Prize of the Ecumenical Jury Una promessa, Gianluca and Massimiliano De Serio, Italy/France/Belgium
- Prize of Ecumenical Jury – Special Mention The Slaughterhouse, Abbas Amini, Iran
- Award of the Student Jury Lorelei, Sabrina Doyle, USA
- Award of the Student Jury – Special Mention Shithouse, Cooper Raiff, USA
- Audience Award Lorelei, Sabrina Doyle, USA

=== 2019 ===
- Grand Newcomer Award Mannheim-Heidelberg (ex aequo) The Grizzlies, Miranda de Pencier, Canada; On The Roof, Jirí Mádl, Czech Republic
- Talent Award Mannheim-Heidelberg Under the Turquoise Sky, KENTARO, Japan/Mongolia
- Special Award Mannheim-Heidelberg End of Sentence, Elfar Adalsteins, Iceland/Ireland/USA
- FIPRESCI International Film Critics' Prize Under the Turquoise Sky, KENTARO, Japan/Mongolia
- Prize of the Ecumenical Jury Rona Azim's Mother, Jamshid Mahmoudi, Afghanistan/Iran
- Special Mention of Mannheim-Heidelberg The Grizzlies, Miranda de Pencier, Canada
- Recommendations of the Jury of Cinema Owners The Grizzlies, Miranda de Pencier, Canada; On The Roof, Jirí Mádl, Czech Republic; Good Morning Son, Sharon Bar Ziv, Israel

=== 2018 ===
- Grand Newcomer Award Mannheim-Heidelberg Orange Days, Arash Lahooti, Iran
- Talent Award Mannheim-Heidelberg The Fireflies Are Gone, Sébastien Pilote, Canada
- Special Award Mannheim-Heidelberg to the actor Christian Malheiros, Socrates, Brazil
- Special Mention Mannheim-Heidelberg to the actress Vivian Wu, Dead Pigs, China
- FIPRESCI International Film Critics' Prize Orange Days, Arash Lahooti, Iran
- Audience Award (International Competition Newcomer Films) Tazzeka, Jean-Philippe Gaud, France/Morocco
- Prize of the Ecumenical Jury Orange Days, Arash Lahooti, Iran
- Recommendations of the Jury of Cinema Owners The Fireflies Are Gone, Sébastien Pilote, Canada; Tazzeka, Jean-Philippe Gaud, France/Morocco; Orange Days by Arash Lahooti, Iran

=== 2017 ===
- Grand Newcomer Award Mannheim-Heidelberg See you in Texas, Vito Palmieri, Italy
- Special Newcomer Award Mannheim-Heidelberg Wailings in the forest, Bagane Fiola, The Philippines
- Special Achievement Award Mannheim-Heidelberg to Sabit Kurmanbekov for the film Returnee, Kasachstan
- Special Mention of Mannheim-Heidelberg to Alejandro Andujar for the film The Watchman, Dominican Republic
- Special Mention of Mannheim-Heidelberg to Shady Srour for the screenplay to Holy Air, Israel
- Special Mention of Mannheim-Heidelberg to Cezmi Baskin for the film Murtaza, Turkey
- Audience Award (International Competition Newcomer Films) Life beyond me, Olivier Peyon, France/Uruguay
- Audience Award (International Competition Newcomer Films) Zer, Kazim Öz, Turkey/Germany
- FIPRESCI International Film Critics' Prize Zer, Kazim Öz, Turkey/Germany
- Prize of the Ecumenical Jury Life beyond me, Olivier Peyon, France/Uruguay
- Recommendation of the Jury of Cinema Owners Holy Air, Shady Srour, Israel, Origami, Patrick Demers, Canada, While we live, Mehdi Avaz, Denmark

=== 2016 ===
- Grand Newcomer Award Mannheim-Heidelberg Reseba- The Dark Wind, Hussain Hassan Ali, Irak, Germany
- Special Newcomer Award Mannheim-Heidelberg Wedding Dance - Kasap Havasi, Cigdem Sezgin, Turkey
- Special Achievement Award Mannheim-Heidelberg to the actress Rimma Zyubina The Nest of the Turtledove, Ukraine
- Special Achievement Award Mannheim-Heidelberg to the actor Majid Potki Another Time, Iran
- Special Mentions of Mannheim-Heidelberg Train Driver's Diary, Milos Radovic, Serbia
- Audience Award (International Competition Newcomer Films) Train Driver's Diary, Milos Radovic, Serbia
- Audience Award (International Competition Newcomer Films) Moon Dog, Philipp John, Ireland
- FIPRESCI International Film Critics' Prize To keep the light Erica Fae, USA
- Prize of the Ecumenical Jury The Nest of the Turtledove Taras Tkachenko, Ukraine
- Recommendation of the Jury of Cinema Owners Calico Skies Valerio Esposito, USA, Moon Dogs, Philipp John, Ireland, Train Driver's Diary Milos Radovic, Serbia

=== 2015 ===
- Grand Newcomer Award Mannheim-Heidelberg The Thin Yellow Line, Celso R. Garcia, Mexico
- Special Newcomer Award Mannheim-Heidelberg 12 Months in 1 Day, Margot Schaap, The Netherlands
- Special Achievement Award Mannheim-Heidelberg to the director Rebecca Cremona Simshar, Malta
- Audience Award (International Competition Newcomer Films) Jeremy, Anwar Safa, Mexico
- FIPRESCI International Film Critics' Prize 12 Months in 1 Day Margot Schaap, The Netherlands
- Prize of the Ecumenical Jury Walking Distance Alejandro Guzmán Álvarez, Mexico
- Recommendation of the Jury of Cinema Owners Home Care Slavek Horak, Czech Republic; Paradise Trips, Raf Reyntjens, Belgium; Jeremy Anwar Safa, Mexico
- New Creators Award Mannheim-Heidelberg Occupied, Karianne Lund and Erik Skjoldbjærg, Norway
- Audience Award (International Competition Serial Dramas) Familie Braun, Manuel Meimberg and Uwe Urbas , Germany

=== 2014 ===
- Newcomer of the Year – Main Award of Mannheim-Heidelberg 23 Segundos (23 Seconds), Dimitry Rudakov, Uruguay
- Special Award of Mannheim-Heidelberg Nabat, Elchin Musaoglu, Azerbaijan
- Special Award of the International Jury A Despedida (Farewell), Marcelo Galvao, Brazil
- Audience Award Ghadi, Amin Dora, Lebanon
- FIPRESCI International Film Critics' Prize Nabat, Elchin Musaoglu, Azerbaijan
- Prize of the Ecumenical Jury Nabat, Elchin Musaoglu, Azerbaijan
- Recommendation of the Jury of Cinema Owners Patrick's Day Terry McMahon, Ireland, In the Crosswind, Martti Helde, Estonia

=== 2013 ===
- Newcomer of the Year – Main Award of Mannheim-Heidelberg Melaza (Molasses), Carlos Lechuga, Cuba/France/Panama
- Special Award of Mannheim-Heidelberg Madariinid (Tangerines), Zaza Urushadze, Estonia, Georgia
- Special Award of the International Jury Før Snøen Faller Before Snowfall, Hisham Zaman, Norway/Germany/Iraq
- Special Award of the International Jury Ghaedeye Tasadof (Bending the Rules), Behnam Behzadi, Iran
- Special Mention of the International Jury De Nieuwe Wereld (The New World), Jaap van Heusden, Netherlands
- Audience Award Mandariinid (Tangerines), Zaza Urushadze, Estonia, Georgia
- FIPRESCI International Film Critics' Prize Drift Benny Vandendrissche, Belgium
- Prize of the Ecumenical Jury Hemma (Home) Maximilian Hult, Sweden/Iceland
- Recommendation of the Jury of Cinema Owners Razredni sovražnik (Class Enemy) Rok Biček, Slowenia; Mandariinid (Tangerines) Zaza Urushadze, Estonia/Georgia; Cyanure (Cyanide) Séverine Cornamusaz, Switzerland/Canada

=== 2012 ===
- Newcomer of the Year – Main Award of Mannheim-Heidelberg Soote Payan (Final Whistle), Niki Karimi, Iran
- Rainer Werner Fassbinder Prize Lycka Till Och ta Hand om Varandra (Good Luck. And Take Care of Each Other), Jens Sjögren, Sweden
- Special Award of the International Jury Tiempos Menos Modernos (Not So Modern Times), Simón Franco, Argentina/Chile
- Special Mention of the International Jury When Yesterday Comes Hsiu-Chiung Chiang, Singing Chen, Wi-Ding Ho, Ko-Shang Shen, Taiwan
- Audience Award Now, Forager. A Film About Love and Fungi, Jason Cortlund, Julia Halperin, USA/Poland
- FIPRESCI International Film Critics' Prize Seenelkäik (Mushrooming) Toomas Hussar, Estonia
- Prize of the Ecumenical Jury Le Sac de Farine (The Bag of Flour) Kadija Leclere, Belgium, Morocco
- Special Mention of the Ecumenical Jury W Sypialni (In a Bedroom) Tomasz Wasilewski, Poland
- Recommendation of the Jury of Cinema Owners La Niña (The Girl) David Riker, USA/UK/Mexico; Now, Forager. A Film About Love and Fungi, Jason Cortlund, Julia Halperin, USA/Poland; Silent City, Threes Anna, Netherlands/Belgium/Luxembourg

=== 2011 ===
- Main Award of Mannheim-Heidelberg Parked, by Darragh Byrne, Ireland
- Rainer Werner Fassbinder Prize Un Cuento Chino (Chinese Take-Away), Sebastián Borensztein, Argentina
- Special Award of the International Jury Le Vendeur (The Salesman), Sébastien Pilote, Canada
- Special Mention of the International Jury Rah Raftan Rouye Rail (Walking on the Rail), by Babak Shirinsefat, Iran; Laurent Capelluto for his performance in Fils unique (My Only Son) by Miel van Hoogenbemt, Belgium; and Piotr Niemyjski, director of photography, Lęk wysokości (Fear of Falling) by Bartosz Konopka, Poland
- Audience Award Un Cuento Chino (Chinese Take-Away), Sebastián Borensztein, Argentina
- FIPRESCI International Film Critics' Prize Le Vendeur (The Salesman), Sébastien Pilote, Canada
- Prize of the Ecumenical Jury Bein Hashmashot (Dusk), by Alon Zingman, Israel
- Recommendations of the Jury of Cinema Owners Bein Hashmashot (Dusk), Alon Zingman, Israel; Elle ne pleure pas, elle chante (She's not crying, she's singing), Philippe de Pierpont, Belgium; Un Amor (One Love), Paula Hernández, Argentina

=== 2010 ===
- Main Award of Mannheim-Heidelberg 10½, by Daniel Grou, Canada
- Rainer Werner Fassbinder Prize Xun huan zuo le (The High Life), by Zhao Dayong, China
- Special Award of the International Jury Siyah Beyaz (Black and White), by Ahmet Boyacioglu, Turkey
- Special Mention of the International Jury Act of Dishonour, by Nelofer Pazira, Canada and Alicia Vikander for her performance in Till det som är vackert (Pure), by Lisa Langseth, Sweden
- Audience Award Eva y Lola by Sabrina Farji, Argentina and Hold om mig (Hold me tight), by Kaspar Munk, Denmark
- FIPRESCI International Film Critics' Prize Xun huan zuo le (The High Life), by Zhao Dayong, China
- Prize of the Ecumenical Jury Hold om mig (Hold me tight), by Kaspar Munk, Denmark
- Recommendations of the Jury of Cinema Owners Till det som är vackert (Pure), Lisa Langseth, Sweden; Win/Win, Jaap van Heusden, The Netherlands; Planes para Mañana, Juana Macías, Spain

=== 2009 ===
- Main Award of Mannheim-Heidelberg Postia Pappi Jaakobille (Letters to Father Jacob), Klaus Härö, Finland
- Rainer Werner Fassbinder Prize Miss Kicki, Hakon Liu, Sweden
- Special Award of the International Jury Demsala Dawî: Sewaxan (The Last Season: Shawaks), Kazim Öz, Turkey
- Special Mention of the International Jury Jonathan Parker for (Untitled), USA; Séverine Cornamusaz for Coeur Animal (Animal Heart), Switzerland
- Audience Award Nurse.Fighter.Boy, Charles Officer, Canada
- FIPRESCI International Film Critics' Prize Coeur Animal (Animal Heart), Séverine Cornamusaz, Switzerland
- Prize of the Ecumenical Jury Coeur Animal (Animal Heart), Séverine Cornamusaz, Switzerland
- Recommendations of the Jury of Cinema Owners Retorno a Hansala (Return to Hansala), Chus Gutiérrez, Spain; (Untitled), Jonathan Parker, USA; Nurse.Fighter.Boy, Charles Officer, Canada

=== 2008 ===
- Main Award of Mannheim-Heidelberg Lluvia (Rain), Paula Hernández, Argentina
- Rainer Werner Fassbinder Prize Un roman policier (A Police Romance), Stéphanie Duvivier, France
- Special Award of the International Jury Másik Bolygó (Another Planet), Ferenc Moldoványi, Hungary
- Special Mention of the International Jury Isabelle Blais for outstanding performance in Borderline, Canada; Lee Chi Yuan for Luan Qing Chun (Beautiful Crazy), Taiwan; K. M. Madhusudhanan for Bioscope, India
- Audience Award Amanecer de un sueño (Awaking From a Dream), Freddy Mas Franqueza, Spain
- FIPRESCI International Film Critics' Prize Borderline, Lyne Charlebois, Canada
- Prize of the Ecumenical Jury Borderline, Lyne Charlebois, Canada
- Recommendations of the Jury of Cinema Owners 14 kilometros (14 Kilometers), Gerardo Olivares, Spain; Borderline, Lyne Charlebois, Canada; Les murs porteurs (Cycles), Cyril Gelblat, France
