= Samira Kawas =

- Occupation(s): Producer, actress, vice president
- Known for: The Hollywood Pop Up Comedy Club

Samira Kawas is a producer and actress based in Beirut. She is the vice president of Symply Entertainment, a production company co-founded by her and American writer, director and producer Ron Senkowski. In 2018 they founded The Hollywood Pop Up Comedy Club.

== Education ==
Samira Kawas is an Antonine University alumna.

== Career ==
Throughout her career Samira Kawas has directed and produced for MBC, Dubai TV, MTV Lebanon, the Travel Channel, and Al Jazeera among other studios. In front of the camera, Kawas starred as Rowieda in the International Digital Emmy Award-winning web comedy series Shankaboot (2011).

Kawas' and Senkowski's production company Symply Entertainment operates internationally from offices in Los Angeles, Dubai and Beirut. Their focus is on adapting internationally acclaimed novels that have multi-cultural components to the storylines. In 2018 they founded The Hollywood Pop Up Comedy Club. Together they bring American A-list comedians to the Middle East, mostly to cities which do not have comedy clubs yet. Their first stand-up comedy event was held in Beirut at the St. Georges Yacht Club in April 2018. Ever since they have produced over 60 shows throughout the Middle East, including the Maz Jobrani "Peaceful Warrior" Tour 2019.

== Filmography ==
| Year | Title | Credits | Notes |
|---|---|---|---|
| 2017 | Life is a Cabaret | Executive producer | TV series |
| 2014 | Only Happens in Dubai | Executive producer | TV special |
| 2014 | The Prophet | Cultural Consultant | |
| 2010 | Shankaboot | Actress | Web Series |
