= Silina =

Silina (Russian: Силина) is the name of several rural localities in Russia:

- Silina (Beloyevskoye Rural Settlement), Kudymkarsky District, Perm Krai, a village in Kudymkarsky District, Perm Krai
- Silina (Verkh-Invenskoye Rural Settlement), Kudymkarsky District, Perm Krai, a village in Kudymkarsky District, Perm Krai

== See also ==
- Evelyn Šilina (born 2001), Estonian footballer
- Evika Siliņa (born 1975), Latvian lawyer and politician
- Tīna Siliņa (born 1995), Latvian curler
- Yelena Silina (born 1987), Russian ice hockey player
