= Let's kill all the lawyers (disambiguation) =

"Let's kill all the lawyers" is a quotation from the William Shakespeare play Henry VI, Part 2. It may also refer to:

- Let's Kill All the Lawyers, a 1992 American film
- "...Let's Kill All The Lawyers!", an issue of The Trial of James T. Kirk series of Star Trek comics
- Kill All the Lawyers, a novel by Paul Levine
- "First Thing We Do, Let's Kill All the Lawyers", an episode from season 2 of the American television series The Newsroom
