= Lotfi Abdelli =

Tunisian actor and comedian (born 1970)

- لطفي العبدلي
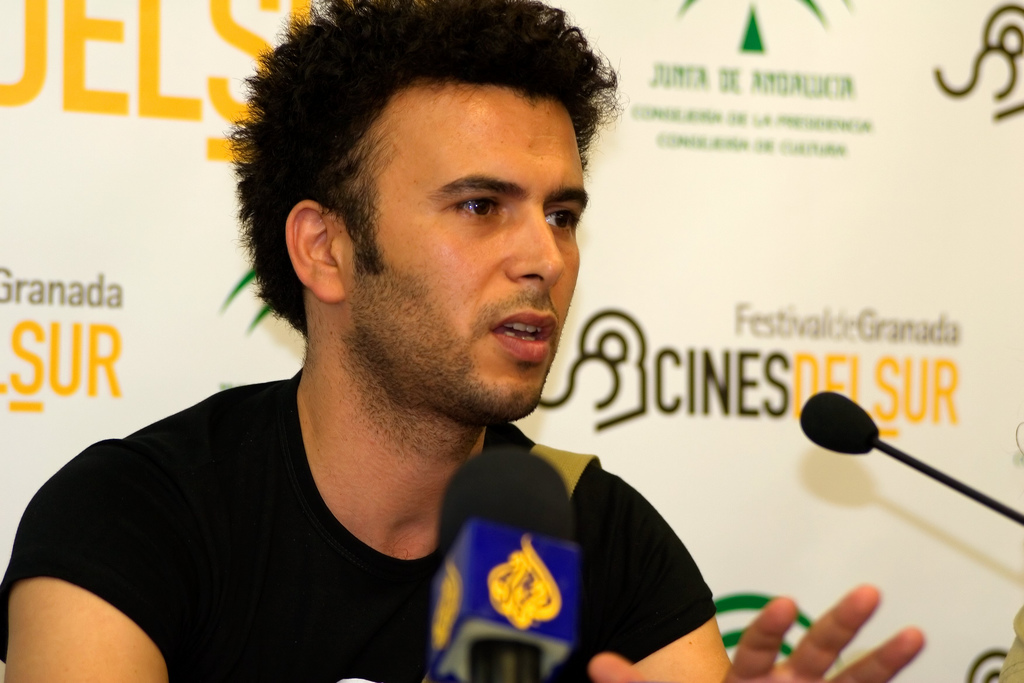
- Lotfi Abdelli in 2007
- Born: March 14, 1970 (age 56); Tunis, Tunisia
- Occupations: Actor, dancer, comedian, television presenter
- Years active: 1991–2022

Lotfi Abdelli (Arabic: لطفي العبدلي, born March 14, 1970, in Tunis) is a Tunisian actor and comedian.

== Biography ==
Lotfi Abdelli started his artistic career as a dancer in Tunis Conservatory, under the direction of Anne-Marie Sellami, and then in the ballet of the National Theatre of Tunisia, under the direction of Mohamed Driss, also in the Tunisian national ballet, under the direction of Odile Cougoule (Histoires d'elles show in 1991), Nawel Skandrani and Imed Jemâa in her company, the Dance Theater. He participated as a dancer in the show of Hadhra by Fadhel Jaziri.

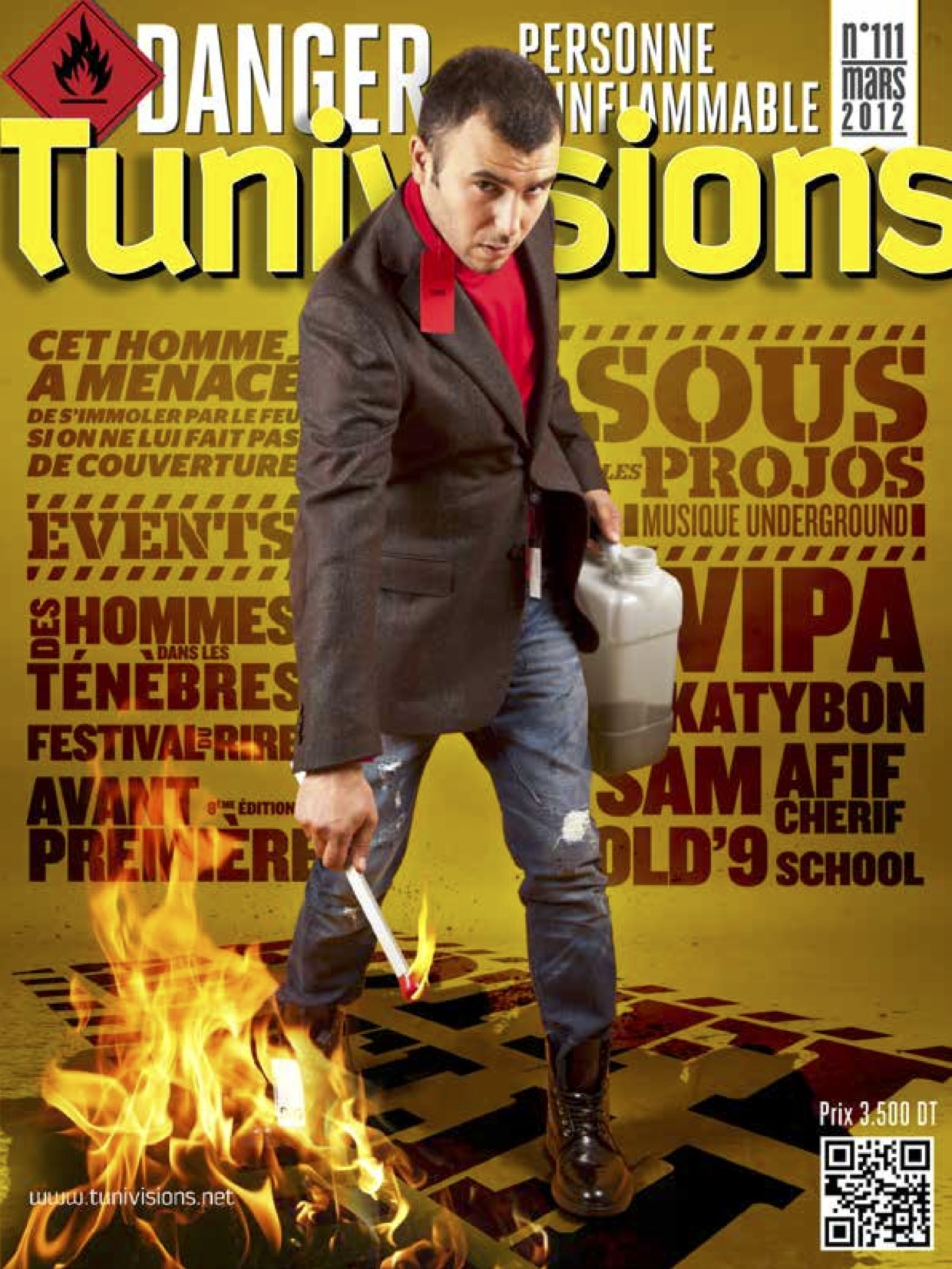
Lotfi Abdelli on the February 2012 cover of Tunivisions

In film acting, he won the award of best performance by an actor in the Carthage Film Festival of 2006 for his role in the film Making Of by Nouri Bouzid.

In August 2012, his one-man show 100% Hallal was cancelled by salafist protesters, who claimed they wanted to pray in the room that was reserved for the show as a way of disrupting it.

In June 2015, he presented the show Chich Bich on the Attessia TV channel. He took advantage to be reconciled with Samir Dilou three years later, an altercation with him on the show Sans éloge on Hannibal TV.

In 2015 and 2016, Abdelli received the award of the best comedian for his role in Bolice and the award of the Ramadan star in Romdhane Awards, organized by Mosaïque FM.

In December 2015, he won the prize for best actor for his performance in Farès Naânaâ's film Les Frontières du ciel at the twelfth Dubai International Film Festival.

In September 2017, Abdelli opened a tea room. And then in December he launched a new television show called Abdelli ShowTime broadcast on the Attessia TV channel. In June 2019 he announced that he wants to become a shareholder in the channel.

In 2019, Lotfi created his one-man show Just Abdelli 100% Tabou.

== Cinema ==
=== Feature films ===
| Year | Title | Role | Director |
|---|---|---|---|
| 1998 | No man's love | Hakim | Nidhal Chatta |
| 2002 | Poupées d'argile | Riva | Nouri Bouzid |
| 2002 | The Assassinated Sun | Zine | Abdelkrim Bahloul |
| 2004 | La Villa | Hédi | Mohamed Damak |
| 2006 | Noce d'été | Sami | Mohktar Ladjimi |
| 2006 | Making Of | Bahta | Nouri Bouzid |
| 2007 | Le Sacre de l'homme | | |
| 2010 | City of Shadows (La Cité) | Soufik | |
| 2010 | Fin décembre | Sofiane | Moez Kammoun |
| 2011 | L'Infiltré | Hamza | |
| 2011 | Always Brando | Lamine | Ridha Béhi |
| 2011 | Le Cochon de Gaza | Young policeman | Sylvain Estibal |
| 2012 | Fausse note | Lotfi Abdelli | Majdi Smiri |
| 2012 | Millefeuille | Brahim | Nouri Bouzid |
| 2014 | Simshar | Simon | Rebecca Cremona |
| 2015 | Les Frontières du ciel | Sami | Fares Naânaâ |
| 2019 | Noura Rêve | Jamel | Hinde Boujenaâ |

=== Medium-length films ===
- 2008: Penalty (Dharbet Jazzaa) by Nouri Bouzid

=== Short films ===
- 2005: Normal (Nesma wa Rih) by Lassaad Dkhili
- 2006: Le Rendez-vous (Ahlem) by Sarra Abidi
- 2006: Ordure by Lotfi Achour
- 2006: Il faut que je leur dise by Amel Smaoui
- 2006: Train Train by Taoufik Béhi
- 2008: Évasion by Mohamed Ajbouni
- 2009: Lee Amel by Jamil Najjar
- 2013: N'importe quoi by Ismahane Lahmar: Paco
- 2015: Ghasra by Jamil Najjar

== Television ==
=== TV series ===
- 1998: Îchqa wa Hkayet of Slaheddine Essid: Zouhair
- 1999: Ghalia of Moncef Kateb and Jamel Eddine Khelif: Kaïs
- 2001: I Didn't Tell You
- 2002: The Kiosk Girl of Khaled Barsaoui: Soltan
- 2003: Chez Azaïez of Hatem Bel Hadj and Slaheddine Essid: Nammoussa
- 2003: Sun & Shadows of Abdellatif Ben Ammar & Mohamed Mongi Ben Tara: Hichem
- 2004: Footsteps on the clouds: Adel
- 2006: Hayet & Amani of Mohamed Ghodbane: Kamel
- 2007–2008: Choufli Hal of Slaheddine Essid & Abdelkader Jerbi: Mohamed Ali – Mido
- 2008: House of Saddam of Jim O'Hanlon: Abdul Samad
- 2008: Sayd Errim of Ali Mansur: Souhail Hannashy
- 2010: Garage Lekrik of Ridha Béhi: Sofien Boulon
- 2011: Njoum Ellil of Mahdi Nasra: Marouen
- 2012: Pour les beaux yeux de Catherine (For Katherine Beautiful Eyes) of Hamadi Arafa: Mr Imed
- 2013–2014: Happy Ness of Majdi Smiri: Hssouna
- 2013–2014: Camera Cafe of Ibrahim Letaief: Dali
- 2015–2018: Bolice of Majdi Smiri: Ammar
- 2015: School of Karim Ben Rhouma: Mr Berjab (Philosophy Professor)
- 2015: Tunisian Histories of Nada Mezni Hfaiedh: Si Mo
- 2015: Lilet Chak (ep.16) (Doubt Night) of Majdi Smiri: Detective
- 2016: The President of Jamil Najjar: Najm
- 2016–2017: Flashback of Mourad Bechikh: Mr Sadok Mahwachi
- 2018–2019: Ali Chouerreb of Rabii Tekali & Madih Belaid: Ali Chouerreb
- 2019: The Affaire 460 of Majdi Smiri: Mr Lamjed – Glanza
- 2019: Nouba (ep.20) of Abdelhamid Bouchnak: Son of Gannouch
- 2021: The Spy of Rabii Tekali: Ziyad

=== TV shows ===
- 1999–2001: Chams Alik of Nejib Belkadhi on Canal+ Horizons
- 2011: Ness El Can on Nessma TV: Guest
- 2012: The Crocodile of Moez Ben Gharbia: Guest
- 2012: Dhouk Tohsol of Kaouther Belhaj on Tunisna TV: Guest
- 2012: Star Time on Tunisna TV : Guest
- 2015: Klem Ennes of Ala Chebbi on El Hiwar Ettounsi TV: Guest
- 2015: Labès of Naoufel Ouertani on Attessia TV: Guest
- 2015: Ça Me Dit Rien (It Doen't Mean Anything For Me) of Amine Gara sur Hannibal TV: Guest
- 2016: Chich Bich on Attessia TV: TV presenter
- 2016: Bayt El Kassid of Zahi Wahbi sur Al Mayadin Culture: Guest
- 2017: Labès (Everything is fine) (TV Show) (Season 8) of Naoufel Ouertani on Attessia TV: Guest
- 2017–2020: Abdelli Showtime: TV presenter
- 2018: Klem Ness (The People's Talk) of Ala Chebbi: Guest
- 2018: Culture of Liana Salah on France 24: Guest
- 2020: Binetna (Between Us) (Episode 1) of Ala Chebbi on El Hiwar El Tounsi: Guest
- 2021: Dari Darek (Web Show) (My Home is Yours) with Amel Smaoui on YouTube Channel of IFM: Guest
- 2021: Wahch Shasha (Screen Monster) of Samir Wafi on Attessia TV: Guest of Episode 27 of Season 3
- 2021 + 2022: Abdelli Big Show on Attessia TV: TV Presenter
- Sayafi

== Theater ==
- 2006: Borj Eddalou by Taoufik El Ayeb
- 2009: Made in Tunisia by Chedly Arfaoui
- 2015: Abdelli Best Of Show
- 2019: Just Abdelli 100% Tabou by Rabi Tekali
