= Making Of (disambiguation) =

The making-of is a documentary genre about the production of a film or television program.

Making Of may also refer to:

- Making Of (2006 film), Tunisian film
- Making Of (2023 film), French film
