= Bell Fund =

Canadian digital content fund

- Industry: Television, Digital Media
- Founded: August 1997
- Headquarters: Toronto, Ontario, Montreal, Quebec
- Area served: Canada
- Key people: Nancy Chapelle, Executive Director Claire Dion, Associate Director
- Owner: Bell Canada
- Website: bellfund.ca

The Bell Fund (formerly the Bell Broadcast and New Media Fund) is an independent private Canadian fund that finances interactive digital content associated with Canadian television programs owned by Bell. These digital extensions can include things such as: web games, mobile apps, mobile games, websites, iTV apps, eBooks and webisodes. Established in 1997, the fund has supported over 1,400 projects with the total amount granted exceeding $150,000,000 as of December 2014.

== History ==
The fund was established in 1997 by Bell Canada and receives annual contributions from Bell Satellite TV and Bell Aliant. It was certified by the CRTC as an independent private fund. The fund was mandated by Bell Canada "To encourage the production of world-class Canadian content for the new media and broadcasting marketplace and to stimulate partnerships between new media and broadcast producers." More specifically, the Fund's mandate has been to help support Canadian companies that create web content that complements Canadian television programs The original funding program provided a grant of up to $250,000 for the digital media project and up to $75,000 for the television component of each project. In 1998 17 projects received funding and a total of $3,288,181 was given out. By 2013 that number had grown significantly with the fund supporting 188 individual projects with grants over $16,500,000. Originally the fund just had one funding program, it now has nine.

== Mandate ==
The purpose of the Bell Fund is to "advance the Canadian broadcasting system." It does this by encouraging relationships between broadcasters, producers and digital media companies. The fund also supports mentorship programs industry research studies and conferences as well as creation of policies and a framework for funding and international co-productions. Additionally, the Bell Fund organizes missions for digital media producers to meet potential co-production companies and international broadcasters including to Australia (2005), Power to the Pixel in London (2013) and Forum Blanc (2014).

== Awards ==
Over the years, projects supported by the Bell Fund have been recognized by many different award organizations including the International Digital Emmy Awards and the Academy of Canadian Cinema & Television. Shane Kinnear, Shaftesbury VP sales and marketing (ReGenesis Extended Reality Game), on being awarded their International Emmy, was quoted saying that support from the Bell Fund allowed Regenesistv.com to be more innovative than other sites being developed at the time. "Site developers and series writers worked together to make the site more than just a promotional tool. For example, elements of the script are created specifically to provide clues for playing the online game."

International Digital Emmy Awards
Project	Award	Year
Endgame Interactive: Facebook Episode	Digital Program: Fiction (nominee)	2012
Endgame Interactive: Facebook Episode	Digital Program: Fiction	2012
ReGenesis Extended Reality Game	Interactive Program	2007

Gemini Awards
Project	Award	Year
Storming Juno Interactive	Best Cross-Platform Project - Non-Fiction	2011
DatingGuy.com	Best Cross-Platform Project - Fiction	2011
Babar and the Adventures of Badou Interactive	Best Cross-Platform Project - Children's and Youth	2011
Taste Buds	Best Cross-Platform Project - Children's and Youth	2010

Canadian Screen Awards
Project	Award	Year
Grojband – the Show Must Go On!	Best Cross-Platform - Children's and Youth	2015
Played – Interference	Best Cross-Platform Project – Fiction	2015
Big Brother Canada Digital	Best Cross-Platform Project – Non-Fiction	2015
My Babysitter's a Vampire Interactive: Humans vs Vampires	Best Cross-Platform - Children's and Youth	2013
The Drunk and On Drugs Happy Fun Time Hour - Digital	Best Cross-Platform Project - Fiction	2013

== Projects ==
Since its creation in 1997, the fund has supported more than 1,400 Canadian television shows and their digital extensions. This includes factual television shows such as The Amazing Race Canada, Eat St. and Big Brother Canada. Additionally, a number of Canadian dramas have received funding including Being Erica, Degrassi: The Next Generation, Murdoch Mysteries, Heartland and Primeval: New World

== See also ==
- Bell Canada
- Bell Media
