= Zer =

Zer or ZER may refer to:

- Zer or Tser (צֵר), name of a city of the Naphtalites in Joshua 19:35
- Zer, the name of the letter zayn (ز) in the Urdu alphabet
- Djer, the third pharaoh of the First Dynasty of Egypt
- Zer (film), a 2017 film by Kazim Öz
- Schuylkill County Airport, the IATA code for the airport in the United States
- Zero Airport, the IATA code for the airport in India
