= Ron Senkowski =

Writer and producer

- Born: United States
- Occupations: Writer, producer, director, executive
- Known for: The Hollywood Pop Up Comedy Club

Ron Senkowski is a writer and producer based in Los Angeles. He is the chief executive officer and president of Symply Entertainment, a production company he founded with Lebanese producer and actress Samira Kawas. Together they also founded The Hollywood Pop Up Comedy Club in 2018.

== Education ==
Senkowski possesses an MBA from the University of Tennessee and an MFA from the University of Michigan.

== Career ==
His directorial debut Let's Kill All the Lawyers (1992) was the first feature film edited using Avid. For a long time Senkowski was Michael Mann's head of development. Furthermore, he wrote features for most of the major studios, as well as for Adam Sandler, Quentin Tarantino and Barry Levinson. He directed and produced several TV shows and features. In 2013 he produced Decoding Annie Parker starring Helen Hunt and Aaron Paul. In 2014 together with actress and producer Salma Hayek Senkowski adapted the worldwide bestseller The Prophet by author Kahlil Gibran. The animated drama film was directed by Roger Allers who is known for his work on some of the biggest Disney hits such as The Lion King and Beauty and the Beast. An in-progress preview of The Prophet took place at the 2014 Cannes Film Festival. The film had its premiere at the Toronto International Film Festival in 2015.

Senkowski is an active member of the Writers Guild of America and Producers Guild of America, where he is on the International Committee. He is also a member of the Academy of Television Arts and Sciences.

Senkowski's production company Symply Entertainment operates internationally from offices in Los Angeles, Dubai and Beirut. Their focus is on adapting internationally acclaimed novels that have multi-cultural components to the storylines. In 2018 Ron Senkowski and Samira Kawas, who is also the Vice President of Symply Entertainment, founded the brand The Hollywood Pop Up Comedy Club. Together they bring American A-list comedians to the Middle East, mostly to cities which do not have comedy clubs yet. Their first stand-up comedy event was held in Beirut at the St. Georges Yacht Club in April 2018. Ever since they have produced over 60 shows throughout the Middle East, including the Maz Jobrani "Peaceful Warrior" Tour 2019.

== Filmography ==
Year	Title	Credits	Notes
2017	Life is a Cabaret	Director; Executive Producer	TV series
2014	Only Happens in Dubai	Director; Executive Producer	TV special
2014	The Prophet	Producer	
2013	Decoding Annie Parker	Producer	
2006	Farmers' Almanac TV	Writer	TV series documentary
2003	American Almanacs: A Living History	Director	Video documentary
1999	Under Contract	Writer; Director; Producer	
1999	Wicked Ways	Writer; Director	
1992	Let's Kill All the Lawyers	Writer; Director; Producer	
