= Under the Bombs =

Under the bombs - تحت القصف
- Poster used in the Venice days
- Directed by: Philippe Aractingi
- Written by: Philippe Aractingi; Michel Leviant
- Produced by: Philippe Aractingi; Hervé Chabalier; François Cohen-Séat; Henri Magalon; Paul Raphaël
- Starring: Nada Abou Farhat; Georges Khabbaz
- Cinematography: Nidal Abdel Khalek
- Music by: René Aubry; Lazare Boghossian
- Distributed by: Lions Gate Films {US}
- Release dates: September 2, 2007 (Venice Film Festival); December 13, 2007 (Lebanon)
- Running time: 98 minutes
- Country: Lebanon
- Languages: Arabic; French
- Box office: $488,227

Under the Bombs (French: Sous les bombes, Arabic: تحت القصف; taht alqasf) is a 2007 Lebanese drama film directed by Philippe Aractingi. The film is set in Lebanon at the end of the 2006 Lebanon War.

== Plot ==
Although she grew up in Lebanon, wealthy Lebanese Muslim Zeina Nasrueddi (Nada Abu Farhat) has been living in Dubai with her architect husband and son, Karim. Marital difficulties led her to send her son to spend the summer with her sister Maha in Lebanon. When the 2006 Lebanon War began she traveled to Beirut via Turkey. In order to find her son, she hires Lebanese Christian taxi driver Tony (Georges Khabbaz) to drive her to Southern Lebanon. In their search for Maha and Karim, they encounter the devastation wrought by the war and learn each other's personal secrets, including the fact that Tony's brother was a member of the South Lebanon Army and is now living in exile in Israel.

== Cast ==
- Nada Abou Farhat as Zeina
- Georges Khabbaz as Tony

== Release ==
Under the Bombs was one of two films shown at the 2008 Sundance Film Festival on the 2006 Lebanon War. The other was Guy Nattiv and Erez Tadmor's Strangers.

The film was presented in 2008 as part of the Giornate degli Autori - Venice days, a parallel section of the Venice film festival.

== Critical response ==
Jonathan Curiel of the San Francisco Chronicle gave the film the Chronicle's highest rating, stating that "Aractingi, a Lebanese director, has - with the help of superb performances by Khabbaz and Abou Farhat - made a work that deftly navigates complicated truths."

== Awards ==
- 2008: Venice Days – Giornate degli Autori—Arca Cinema Giovani Award: Best Film “Other Visions” and the Eiuc Human Rights Film Award
- Jury Junior Prize at Festival International du Film Francophone de Namur
- Critics Prize and NETPAC Prize NETPAC at International Antalya Golden Orange Film Festival
- Gold Muhr and the Best Actress Award (Nada Abou Farhat) at the Dubai Film Festival
- Prix Coup de Coeur, Best Music Award and Audience Award at Luchon International Film and TV Festival.
