= Simshar (film) =

2014 film

- Film poster
- Directed by: Rebecca Cremona
- Written by: David Grech; Rebecca Cremona
- Starring: Lotfi Abdelli
- Edited by: Daniel Lapira
- Release date: 27 April 2014
- Running time: 101 minutes
- Country: Malta
- Language: Maltese

Simshar is a 2014 Maltese drama film directed by Rebecca Cremona. It was selected as the Maltese entry for the Best Foreign Language Film at the 87th Academy Awards, but was not nominated. It was the first time that Malta submitted a film for the Best Foreign Language Oscar. The film tells the story of the Simshar incident.

During 2015 and 2016, Simshar entered the global festival circuit, collecting several awards including the Special Achievement Award at the International Filmfestival Mannheim-Heidelberg and Best International Feature at Edmonton International Film Festival. In 2015 Gravitas Ventures (US) obtained the worldwide distribution rights for the film including for VOD platforms.

== Cast ==
- Lotfi Abdelli as Simon
- Jimi Busuttil as Karmenu
- Sékouba Doucouré as Moussa
- Chrysander Agius as John
- Adrian Farrugia as Theo
- Clare Agius as Sharin
- Mark Mifsud as Alex

== See also ==
- List of submissions to the 87th Academy Awards for Best Foreign Language Film
- List of Maltese submissions for the Academy Award for Best Foreign Language Film
