= The Last Season: Shawaks =

Documentary by Kazim Öz

- Directed by: Kazim Öz
- Release date: 2009
- Running time: 93 minutes

The Last Season: Shawaks (Kurdish:Demsala Dawî: Sewaxan) is a documentary by Kazim Öz released in 2009. For a duration of 93 minutes, it focuses on the lives of the nomadic tribe of the Shawaks in Eastern Turkey.

== Production ==
For the film, Öz accompanied the tribe for the duration of one year with a translator. The film plays in the Dersim region, where Öz lived until the age of seven-teen. The film was pre-purchased by the German-French television network arte and counted with funding by the Dutch documentary agency.

== Synopsis ==
The film describes the nomadic lives of the Shawak (also spelled Shekak) a community comprising about 3500 people living in 15 villages in the Dersim region. The film encompasses the four seasons and begins with the narration of a folktale about the cycle of life. It starts in winter and after having passed spring summer and the fall, ends in again in Winter. The Shawak are observed making bread, taking care of the children, herding their livestock or trading with merchants. In one scene men acknowledge that they beat their women, and women protest against this. The film does not have many spoken passages and the few are predominantly in Kurdish.

== Screenings ==
The film was acclaimed by the documentary film community and premiered at the Swiss Visions du Réel in Nyon, a prominent film festival for the documentary film. It was introduced as a "cosmic ode to a yet unchanged world" by the festival director Jean Perret. It received the International Jury award of the International Filmfestival Mannheim-Heidelberg, where it competed as the only documentary film in the segment international feature film. it was not included in the prestigious Golden Orange Film Festival in Antalya, one of the most prominent ones in Turkey. It was condemned as censorship by Kazim Öz and the Mesopotamia Center. They jointly released a statement accusing the festival of excluding an international successful film which depicts a reality contradicting the official discourse.
