= Luzzu (film) =

2021 film directed by Alex Camilleri

- Theatrical release poster
- Directed by: Alex Camilleri
- Written by: Alex Camilleri
- Produced by: Rebecca Anastasi; Ramin Bahrani; Oliver Mallia; Alex Camilleri
- Starring: Jesmark Scicluna; Michela Farrugia; David Scicluna
- Cinematography: Léo Lefèvre
- Edited by: Alex Camilleri
- Production company: Memento Films International
- Distributed by: Kino Lorber (United States); Peccadillo Pictures (United Kingdom)
- Release date: January 29, 2021 (Sundance)
- Running time: 94 minutes
- Country: Malta
- Language: Maltese
- Box office: $39,948

Luzzu is a 2021 Maltese drama film written and directed by Alex Camilleri. The film stars Jesmark Scicluna, Michela Farrugia and David Scicluna.

Luzzu had its world premiere at the 2021 Sundance Film Festival on January 29, 2021. It was selected as the Maltese entry for the Best International Feature Film at the 94th Academy Awards.

== Plot ==
To support his wife and child, a Maltese fisherman enters the world of black market fishing.

== Cast ==
The cast include:

- Jesmark Scicluna as Jesmark
- Michela Farrugia as Denise
- David Scicluna
- Frida Cauchi
- Uday McLean
- Stephen Buhagiar

== Release ==
Luzzu had its world premiere at the 2021 Sundance Film Festival on January 29, 2021 in the World Cinema Dramatic Competition section. The following month, Kino Lorber acquired the US distribution rights to the film, while Peccadillo Pictures acquired the UK distribution rights.

== Reception ==
On the review aggregator website Rotten Tomatoes, the film has an approval rating of 98% based on reviews from 60 critics, with an average rating of 7.8/10. The website's consensus reads, "Beautifully filmed and emotionally impactful, Luzzu uses one man's story to capture the struggles of a region at a cultural crossroads." On Metacritic, the film has a weighted average score of 78 out of 100 based on 16 critical reviews, indicating "generally favorable reviews".

Malcolm Scerri-Ferrante, writing for the Times of Malta, commended the film's story, cinematography, score, and sound design, as well as Scicluna's performance: "Sometimes a filmmaker needs to strike gold and some luck is usually needed. Jesmark Scicluna was Camilleri's strike." He added, "Camilleri managed to create a story that resonates or is easily imaginable. Adding the fisheries industry into the background was a smart move as there are not enough films that reveal the world of traditional fisherman. [...] I find the making of a successful film is about reaching two goals. Does the film tell me something I did not know and does the film touch my heart? Luzzu managed to do both, easily."

The New York Times' Natalia Winkelman praised Camilleri's direction, writing that he "demonstrates a sophisticated understanding of how small moments can build a sense of place: sandals on the salty floor of a fishery; a metal scraper peeling paint from a hull; a priest blessing boats for safe passage. Malta's views are arresting, but the images Camilleri chooses would never be found in a travel brochure. In his subtle, vérité approach, he captures something special — not one man's crisis, but a community's culture." Carlos Aguilar of the Los Angeles Times called the film a "terrific debut", lauding Scicluna's performance, as well as the cinematography and score. He concluded that the film is "made vividly compelling in the hand of a new storyteller with classically honed sensibilities."

== See also ==
- List of submissions to the 94th Academy Awards for Best International Feature Film
- List of Maltese submissions for the Academy Award for Best International Feature Film
