= Void (film) =

2013 film

- Film poster
- Directed by: Tarek Korkomaz; Zeina Makki; Jad Beyrouthy; Christelle Ighniades; Salim Habr; Maria Abdel Karim; Naji Bechara
- Written by: Georges Khabbaz
- Produced by: Sam Lahoud; Nicolas Khabbaz
- Starring: Carol Abboud; Latife Moultaka
- Cinematography: Kamal Bou Nassar
- Edited by: Salim Habr
- Music by: Cedric Kayem
- Release date: 16 November 2013
- Running time: 78 minutes
- Country: Lebanon
- Language: Arabic

Void (Arabic: وينن) is a 2013 Lebanese drama film written by Georges Khabbaz and directed by seven different directors, who are all graduates from Notre Dame University. The film was nominated as the Lebanese entry for the Best Foreign Language Film at the 88th Academy Awards but it was not selected.

== Cast ==
- Carol Abboud
- Rodrigue Sleiman
- Latifeh Moultaka
- Antoine Moultaka
- Takla Chamoun
- Liliane Nemri
- Ziad Soueiby
- Diamand Bou Abboud
- Elie Metri
- Carmen Lebbos
- Julian Farhat
- Nada Abou Farhat
- Talal El-Jordi
- Lara Khabbaz

== See also ==
- List of submissions to the 88th Academy Awards for Best Foreign Language Film
- List of Lebanese submissions for the Academy Award for Best Foreign Language Film
