= The Hollywood Pop Up Comedy Club =

International comedy venue chain

- Status: Active
- Genre: Comedy
- Date: April 2018
- Locations: Los Angeles; Beirut
- Country: United States; Beirut
- Founders: Ron Senkowski; Samira Kawas
- Major events: Stand-up comedy
- Website: hollywoodpopupentertainment.com

The Hollywood Pop Up Comedy Club is a Los Angeles and Beirut based brand which brings U.S. comedians to cities where they do not have comedy clubs yet. It was launched by co-founders Ron Senkowski and Samira Kawas in April 2018.

== History ==
The first stand-up comedy event was held in Beirut at the St. Georges Yacht Club. After a year of shows in Beirut, the company expanded to Saudi Arabia by bringing six U.S.-based comedians to perform during the first ever Jeddah Season in June 2019. After this, the company has produced Maz Jobrani's Middle Eastern Peaceful Warrior tour and events in Bahrain, Dubai, Oman, Jordan, Kuwait, Doha, Riyadh, and Jeddah. At the 2019 inaugural edition of Riyadh Season, the team brought Eddie Griffin to perform for two nights in the Boulevard zone.

== Events (2018–present) ==
Comedians	Date	Year	City	Country	Note
Harland Williams, Jade Catta-Preta, Jamie Kennedy, Skyler Stone	April 23–26	2018	Beirut	Lebanon	
Amir K, Byron Bowers, Jessimae Peluso, Skyler Stone	July 20–22	2018	Beirut	Lebanon	
Bret Ernst, Chinedu Unaka, Crystal Marie Denha, Justin Martindale	November 30 – December 1	2018	Beirut	Lebanon	
Kate Quiqley, Rene Vaca, Tehran	June 6–7	2019	Beirut	Lebanon	
Dean Edwards, Godfrey, Harland Williams, Pauly Shore, Pete Lee, Vincent O'Shana		2019	Jeddah	Saudi Arabia	
Eddie Griffin		2019	Riyadh	Saudi Arabia	
Ahmed Ahmed, Jason Collings, Reem Edan		2019	Manama	Bahrain	
Maz Jobrani "Peaceful Warrior" Tour		2019		Kuwait Katar Jordan UAE Bahrain Oman	
Max Amini	January 19	2020	Manama	Bahrain	
