= Shankaboot =

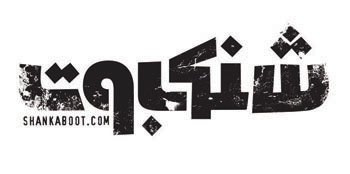
- Also known as: Shankaboot
- Genre: Web series, drama, comedy
- Created by: Bassem Breish, Ashraf Nasr, Leila Mroueh, Basima Takrori, Jamal Ghosn, Nadim Deaibes, Katia Saleh, Chris Carey & James Payne
- Developed by: James Payne
- Directed by: Amin Dora
- Starring: Hassan Akil; Samira Kawas; Nasry El Sayegh; Latifa Saade; Juliana Yazbeck; Saseen Kawzally; Moudi Hamadi
- Composer: Rayess Bek
- Country of origin: Lebanon
- Original language: Arabic
- No. of seasons: 5
- No. of episodes: 52

Production
- Executive producer: Chris Carey
- Producer: Katia Saleh
- Production location: Saseen Kawzally
- Cinematography: Muriel Aboulrouss
- Editors: Rana Sabbagha; Wajdi Elian; Simon El Habre Christian Bitsch
- Running time: Approx 5 minutes
- Production company: Batoota Films

Original release
- Network: YouTube; Facebook
- Release: 13 March 2010 – 2010

Shankabout is an interactive web series filmed in and around Beirut, Lebanon. It is the world's first Arabic web drama series.

== Series overview ==
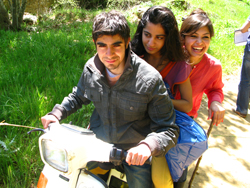
Delivery Boy Suleiman on the Shankaboot

Shankabout follows Suleiman, a 15-year-old, delivery boy. Other characters include 19-year-old Ruwaida and the mysterious 20-something Chadi. The show presents Beirut life and the life in Lebanon in a realistic style. The show's creators cast actors with little to no prior acting experience for a naturalistic acting style.

== Additional elements in Shankaboot ==
Between seasons, weekly episodes called “Inside Shankabout” were released. These short videos provided insight on the characters’ thoughts, desires, explanations to events and the comical endeavors that surrounded the production of the series.

In Autumn 2010, Shankabout released “Shankactive”, an online forum and showcase platform for creative talent in the Middle East. This platform enabled Shankaboot viewers to participate in creating their own stories through various media and visual means. In parallel with the launch of “Shankactive”, young Lebanese were trained in video production and storytelling through a series of workshops.

== Production ==
The production of the first season of Shankabout took place in Beirut in December, 2009, largely in the area of Burj-Hammoud, a densely populated town on the Eastern borders of Beirut. The second season of Shankaboot was filmed in Beirut and the Bekaa Valley. The third season was filmed again in Beirut during July 2010. The fourth and fifth seasons were released in 2011. Shankaboot was produced by Batoota Films in Association the BBC World Service Trust and The Welded Tandem Picture Company.
