= Ghadi (film) =

2013 film

- Film poster
- Arabic: غدي
- Directed by: Amin Dora
- Written by: Georges Khabbaz
- Produced by: Gabriel Chamoun
- Starring: Georges Khabbaz
- Cinematography: Karim Ghorayeb
- Release date: 31 October 2013
- Running time: 95 minutes
- Country: Lebanon
- Language: Arabic

Ghadi (Arabic: غدي) is a 2013 Lebanese drama film directed by Amin Dora. The film was originally selected as the Lebanese entry for the Best Foreign Language Film at the 86th Academy Awards in a two-way race over Lara Saba's Blind Intersections. When the film's release date was moved from 26 September 2013 to 31 October 2013, it no longer met the eligibility dates and Blind Intersections became the official submission from Lebanon. The film was submitted the following year as Lebanon's official submission, but was not nominated.

== Cast ==
- Georges Khabbaz as Leba Saba
- Lara Matar as Lara, Leba's Wife
- Christine Choueiri as Sophie
- Emmanuel Khairallah as Ghadi
- Camille Salemeh as the Barber
- Samir Youssef as Lello
- Caroline Labaki as Nisrine
- Rodrigue sleimen as Gerard
- Gizelle Bouez as Neighbour
- Emile Chahine as Hassan
- Tarek Basha as the Police Officer

== See also ==
- List of submissions to the 87th Academy Awards for Best Foreign Language Film
- List of Lebanese submissions for the Academy Award for Best Foreign Language Film
