= Let's Kill All the Lawyers =

- Directed by: Ron Senkowski
- Written by: Ron Senkowski
- Produced by: Shannon Hamed; Ron Senkowski
- Starring: Ron Senkowski
- Cinematography: Lon Stratton
- Edited by: Christa Kindt
- Music by: Martin Liebman
- Release date: April 27, 1992 (WorldFest-Houston)
- Running time: 100 minutes
- Country: United States
- Language: English

Let's Kill All the Lawyers is a 1992 American independent comedy-drama film written by, directed by and starring Ron Senkowski. It is Senkowski's directorial debut and was the first feature film edited using Avid.

== Cast ==
- Rick Frederick as Foster Merkul
- James Vezina as Junior Rawley
- Michelle DeVuono as Satori Bunko
- Lee Gusta as Pope
- Cheryl Roy as Larissa
- Joanne Long as Penelope
- Sonya A. Avakian as Tortuously Intricate Lawyer
- Ron Senkowski as Crazy Mikey
- Lewis Arquette as Antinus
- Dick Butkus as The Turnkey
- Hamilton Camp as Marcus
- Richard Moll as The Centurian
- Felton Perry as Cyrus

== Production ==
The film was shot in Michigan.
