= Simshar incident =

2008 maritime incident in Malta

Coordinates: 35°50′30″N 14°32′41″E

Simshar incident refers to an incident whereby four people died before or after an explosion took place aboard a fishing vessel named Simshar off the eastern coast of Malta. The incident took place on July 11, 2008.

== Incident ==
On the morning of 7 July 2008, Simshar departed the coast of Marsaxlokk, a small, traditional fishing village in the South Eastern Region of Malta on a fishing trip, expected to return on 11 July. The boat was carrying five people - its owner, Simon Bugeja, his father Karmenu Bugeja, his 11-year-old son Theo Bugeja, a Maltese man named Noel Carabott, and a Somali man named Abdulrahman Abdala Gedi. It is believed that a blast took place on board the vessel on 11 July, destroying the boat. The five people on board survived the blast and survived for several days adrift a makeshift raft made of floating debris from the blast.

== Victims ==
Four of the five people on board the Simshar died in the days following the incident, Simon Bugeja being the sole survivor. According to Simon Bugeja, Abdulrahman Abdala Gedi died on 12 July, followed by Noel Carabott on 13 July, Karmenu Bugeja on 14 July, and Theo Bugeja on 18 July. The bodies of three of the victims were recovered, however that of Theo Bugeja was never found. Following an extensive search by the Armed Forces of Malta, and the Maltese fishing community, a fishing vessel called the Grecale found Simon Bugeja alive on 18 July.

== In popular culture ==
The incident was dramatised by Maltese director Rebecca Cremona through a 2014 film titled Simshar.
