= Amin Dora =

- Born: Amin Dora; 1980; Zahle, Lebanon
- Education: Lebanese Academy of Fine Arts
- Occupations: Film director, Visual artist
- Years active: 2003–present
- Website: amindora.com

Amin Dora (Arabic: أمين درة, born 1980 in Zahle, Lebanon) is a film director, visual artist and professor at the Lebanese Academy of Fine Arts. In 2010, he directed the first Arabic web drama series, Shankaboot, winner of the Digital Emmy Award.

== Career ==
Dora's film career began with his stop motion animated short film Greyscale, which won the audience award at the Zinebi - Bilbao International Documentary and Short Film Festival. In 2011, he won a Digital Emmy Award for Shankaboot, the world's first Arabic web series. Composed of 5-minute episodes, the series explores ways of portraying real life in Beirut through the eyes of 15-year-old delivery boy. His next project, Undocumented: Bidune Kaid, is an interactive drama specifically designed for social media and internet viewing. In the course of the episodes, that last from two to five minutes each, the viewer is allowed to choose the storyline. Created by Syrian artist Rafi Wahbi, the story follows three Syrian separate characters in their journey of self discovery amidst civil war.

Ghadi, Dora's debut feature film, premiered in 2013 at the Busan International Film Festival and received the prestigious KNN Audience Award. Following its release, the film was selected as the Lebanese entry for the Best Foreign Language Film at the 86th Academy Awards. In 2014, the film is recipient of the Murex d'Or for Best Lebanese Film and won the audience award at the International Filmfestival Mannheim-Heidelberg in Germany.

In 2021, Dora is the director of Shahid series Hell’s Gate, the world's first Arabic sci-fi action drama, set in Beirut in the year 2052.

== Filmography ==
Year	Title	Director	Writer	Notes
2003	Greyscale	Yes	Yes	short film
2010	Shankaboot	Yes	No	web series
2013	Ghadi	Yes	No	feature film
2017	Undocumented: Bidune Kaid	Yes	No	web series
2021	Hell's Gate	Yes	No	web series

== Awards and nominations ==
Year	Organization	Award	Work	Result	Ref.
2003	Festival Unimovie	Special Jury Prize	Greyscale	Won	
2003	Zinebi - Bilbao International Documentary and Short Film Festival	Cine Club Jury Prize	Greyscale	Won	
2010	Geneva International Film Festival	Best web series	Shankaboot	Won	
2011	International Emmy Awards	Best Digital fiction show	Shankaboot	Won	
2014	Los Angeles Web Series Festival	Outstanding Director	Shankaboot	Won	
2014	Murex d'Or	Best Lebanese Film	Ghadi	Won	
2014	International Filmfestival Mannheim-Heidelberg	Audience Award	Ghadi	Won	
2014	Arabian Sights Film Festival	Audience Award	Ghadi	Won	
2014	Busan International Film Festival	KNN Audience Choice Award	Ghadi	Won	
2015	Minneapolis–Saint Paul International Film Festival	Best feature by Emerging filmmaker	Ghadi	Nominated	
2015	Skip City International D-Cinema Festival	Best Film	Ghadi	Nominated	
2018	Bilbao Seriesland Festival	Best series	Undocumented: Bidune Kaid	Won	
2018	Top Short Film Festival	Best web series	Undocumented: Bidune Kaid	Won	
2018	Webfest Berlin	Best suspense series	Undocumented: Bidune Kaid	Won	
