= Making Of (2006 film) =

Making of
- Directed by: Nouri Bouzid
- Screenplay by: Nouri Bouzid
- Produced by: C.T.V. Services
- Starring: Lotfi Abdelli, Fatima Saïdane, Afef Ben Mahmoud, Lotfi Dziri, Foued Litaiem
- Cinematography: Michel Baudour
- Edited by: Karim Hamouda
- Music by: Néjib Charradi
- Release date: 2006
- Running time: 115 minutes
- Country: Tunisia

Making of is a 2006 Tunisian film.

== Synopsis ==
After failing sentimentally, with his family and at school, Bahta, a 25 years old breakdancer, feels down and, due to the Iraq war, reconsiders his clandestine escape. A rebel and disobedient by nature, the leader of a little breakdancer band, accomplishes many fearless deeds, provoking the police's anger. Wanted, he falls in with fundamentalists. The brainwashing process will not take place without mishaps.

== Awards ==
- Cartago 2006
- FESPACO 2007
- Tetuán 2007
- TRIBECA 2007
- Taormina 2007
- Festival de New Delhi
- Festival de Orán
- FCAT 2008
