= Kawa Nemir =

Kurdish writer and translator (born 1974)

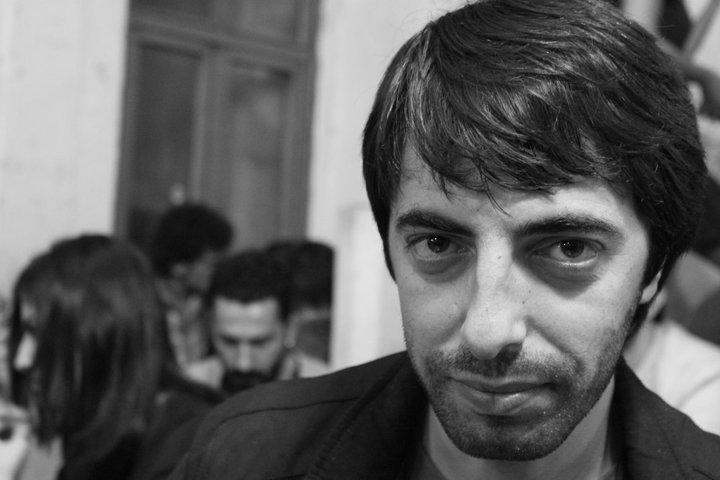
- Kawa Nemir
- Born: 29 May 1974 (age 52); Iğdır, Turkey
- Citizenship: Dutch
- Occupations: Writer, publisher and translator
- Writing career
- Language: Kurdish language

Kawa Nemir (born 29 May 1974, Iğdir, Turkey) is a Kurdish writer and translator of English language works into the Kurdish language. His translations include Ulysses by James Joyce and the play Hamlet of William Shakespeare. He was also the editor-in-chief of the Kurdish literary magazine Jiyana Rewşen.

== Early life and education ==
He was born in 1974 in Iğdir into an upper-class family and attended schools for primary education both in Iğdir and Istanbul. According to an interview published in Voice of America, he was faced with assimilation and denial of the Kurdish nation in school. After he studied English language and literature at the Universities Hacettepe and Istanbul he also studied Ancient Greek at the University of Istanbul until 2002. He did not like several of his friends join the Kurdistan Workers' Party (PKK), which fight against the Turkish Army but chose to become a writer. In the early 2000s he moved to Diyarbakır.

== Professional career ==
Since 1997 Nemir was the editor-in-chief of a prominent cultural and literary magazine in the Kurdish language, the Jiyana Rewşen. Under his lead, the magazine published fifty-two issues on a monthly basis until 2003. In 2012, his translation of Shakespeare's Hamlet premiered in the RAST theatre of Amsterdam, Netherlands. It was the first Kurdish adaption of Hamlet. and was later staged on several locations and occasions by the Municipally City Theatre of Diyarbakir. In 2019, his translation of Giacomo Puccini's opera Tosca premiered in the Amsterdam City theatre. Besides having translated many classics of Greek and Roman literature into the Kurdish language, he is also playwright and has adapted the Kurdish classic Mem u Zin by Ehmedê Xhanî for theatre.

== Recognition ==
- 2010 Feqî Huseyîn Sagniç award by the Kurdish Institute of Istanbul.
- 2018 Resident in the former home of Anne Frank by the Dutch Foundation of Literature
