= The Prophet (2014 film) =

2014 animated drama film

- Theatrical release poster
- Directed by: Roger Allers
- Screenplay by: Roger Allers
- Based on: The Prophet by Kahlil Gibran
- Produced by: Salma Hayek; Clark Peterson; Jose Tamez; Ron Senkowski
- Starring: Liam Neeson; Salma Hayek; John Krasinski; Frank Langella; Alfred Molina; Quvenzhané Wallis
- Edited by: Jennifer Dolce
- Music by: Gabriel Yared; Damien Rice; Glen Hansard; Lisa Hannigan
- Production companies: Ventanarosa; FFA Private Bank; MYGROUP; Doha Film Institute; Financière Pinault; Participant Media; Bardel Entertainment
- Distributed by: Pathé Distribution (France); GKIDS (United States)
- Release dates: September 6, 2014 (TIFF); August 7, 2015 (United States)
- Running time: 85 minutes
- Countries: Canada; France; Lebanon; Qatar; United States
- Language: English
- Budget: $12 million
- Box office: $725,489

The Prophet (full title Kahlil Gibran's The Prophet) is a 2014 animated anthology drama film written and directed by Roger Allers, based on the 1923 book by Kahlil Gibran. The production consisted of different directors for each of the film's collective essays, including Paul and Gaëtan Brizzi, Joan C. Gratz, Mohammed Saeed Harib, Tomm Moore, Nina Paley, Bill Plympton, Joann Sfar and Michal Socha. The film stars Liam Neeson, Salma Hayek (also a producer), John Krasinski, Frank Langella, Alfred Molina and Quvenzhané Wallis.

The film had an in-progress preview at the 2014 Cannes Film Festival and its world premiere at the 2014 Toronto International Film Festival. It was released in the United States on 7 August 2015 by GKIDS, and received generally positive reviews from critics. It was submitted to the Academy of Motion Picture Arts and Sciences to be considered for a nomination for Best Animated Feature, but was ultimately not nominated for the award. It was Allers' final film as director before his death in 2026.

== Plot ==
Set in Lebanon under the Ottoman Empire, Kamila, a widowed mother, works as the housekeeper for Mustafa, a foreign poet, painter and political activist being held under house arrest. Mustafa is guarded by the soldier Halim, who secretly pines for Kamila. Kamila's young daughter, Almitra, has stopped talking due to her father's death, and has become a troublemaker who frequently steals from local merchants. Almitra has seagulls for her only friends; she even seems able to talk to them by making birdlike noises.

When Halim's pompous Sergeant arrives to tell Mustafa that he is now free, he must board a ship to his home country by day's end. The Sergeant escorts Mustafa to the ship, and Mustafa spends the time conversing with Kamila, Almitra and Halim, as well as with the townspeople, who regard him a hero. Mustafa's conversations, ranging in topics from freedom, parenthood and marriage, to working, eating, love, and good and evil are animated by the film's various directors in their own unique styles.

Once they reach the ship, the army imprisons Mustafa in a fortress instead of allowing him to board. The commanding officer labels Mustafa's writings as seditious, and demands that he retract his statements. Mustafa refuses, asserting that his writings are not seditious. Thus, the commanding officer sentences Mustafa to death by firing squad the next morning unless he disavows his writings. That evening, Kamila, Almitra and Halim try to help Mustafa escape.

Almitra sees Mustafa through his prison cell window, and talks for the first time since her father's death. Mustafa refuses to try to escape, giving his final animated poem, this time on death. His final wish is that his friends return to the house and rescue all his paintings and writings before the army can destroy them. The next day, Mustafa once again refuses to renounce his writings as he is being led to the firing squad in the fortress's open yard. A large flock of seagulls surround him as he is being placed in position.

Over at the house, Kamila and Almitra retrieve all of Mustafa's writings and drawings right before the army arrives, and they hide in the woods. Suddenly, they hear loud gunfire and see the flock of seagulls flee the fortress but Almitra insists that Mustafa is all right. As she sees the flock circle around the now departing ship, Almitra sees Mustafa's spirit aboard the homebound ship.

== Voice cast ==
- Liam Neeson as Mustafa
- Salma Hayek as Kamila
- John Krasinski as Halim
- Frank Langella as Pasha
- Alfred Molina as Sergeant
- John Rhys-Davies as Yousef
- Quvenzhané Wallis as Almitra

Additional voices by Assaf Cohen, John Kassir, Nick Jameson, Fred Tatasciore, Terri Douglas, Lynnanne Zager, Leah Allers, Caden Armstrong, Gunnar Sizemore, Mona Marshall, Rajia Baroudi and Michael Bell.

French version

- Mika as Mustafa

== Release ==
The film was released on-demand on 19 January 2016, and on Blu-ray/DVD on 2 February 2016.

== Reception ==
On the review aggregator website Rotten Tomatoes, the film holds an approval rating of 65% based on 72 reviews, with an average rating of 6.60/10. The website's critical consensus reads, "Kahlil Gibran's the Prophet is a thrillingly lovely adaptation of the classic text, albeit one that doesn't quite capture the magic of its source material." Metacritic gives the film a weighted average score of 61 out of 100 based on reviews from 21 critics, indicating "generally favorable reviews".

Peter Sobczynski of RogerEbert.com gave it three and a half stars out of four and called it "a wildly ambitious and frequently fascinating film that moviegoers of all ages should find both entertaining and provocative in equal measure." Peter Debruge of Variety wrote, "As if it weren't special enough to hear Neeson recite Gibran's sentiments amidst such striking visuals, the addition of music further elevates verses that so many have already committed to memory and which a whole new audience can now discover for the first time." Joe McGovern of Entertainment Weekly gave the film a "B" grade, saying, "Each one [of the individual sequences] soars (especially clay painter Joan Gratz's color-bursting snippet, "On Work"), even if the plot holding them together is frustratingly Disneyish." Roger Moore of Movie Nation gave the film three stars out of four and described it in his review as "a lovely work, imbued with all the sweetness a Who's Who of great animators can give it."

Writing for TheWrap, James Rocchi called the film "well intentioned, but not especially well executed". Matthew Kassel of The Observer gave the film two stars out of four and wrote, "Often, Mustafa's musings come unbeckoned—and mostly feel pedantic, like a kind of philosophical mansplaining. You get the gist of what he's saying, but at a certain point—near the third quarter of the film, I'd say—the prophet's ambiguous words start to grate." In her review for The New York Times, Jeannette Catsoulis described the film as a "collection of eight mini-sermons [that] falls flat."
