= Teatra Jiyana Nû =

Kurdish language theatre group

Teatra Jiyana Nû is a Kurdish Theatre Company based in Istanbul, Turkey established in 1992. It is one of the best known theatre groups in the Kurdish language and several of their former actors founded new theatre groups in other cities.

== Origins ==
Kurdish Theatre was for long prohibited in Turkey just as was the Kurdish language. In the Kurdish provinces in Turkey, Kurdish language plays were not able to be performed legally. A legal Kurdish theatre culture was first known in Istanbul, after the Kurdish language was allowed to be spoken in 1991. The same year, the Mesopatamia Cultural Center (Kurdish: Navenda Çanda Mezopotamya, NÇM; Turkish: Mezopotamya Kültür Merkezi, MKM) was established in Istanbul. The MKM had an art department which included a theatre group. The first theatre play performed in 1991 was Misko (mouse).

== History ==
After a theatre festival in Adana the next year in which the theatre group of the MKM consisting of Kazim Öz and Kemal Organ among others performed Bu Şivan (Two shepherds), the Teatra Jiyana Nu was founded and in June 1992. In the TJN subdivision Theatre Helin apprentices were trained for two years after which they were able to try their acting at the Sarya Halk Sahnesi which staged short agitprop sketches on strikes or union gatherings. Several plays written by Hüseyin Kaytan such as Daweya Cenaralê Teneke (Tin General Case) were performed by the TJN until 1995. But according to Erdal Ceviz, the successor of Kaytan, his play were too poetic and complex for the actors who were not used to read Kurdish texts. Therefore for the TJN began a new era with no pre-written texts but plays developed through collective brainstorming under Ceviz. In the late 1990s the police executed several raids on Kurdish theatre venues and the theatre stage in Istanbul was closed down in 1998. As a result, the TJN organized a theatre tour through more than ten cities in Germany with their play Bridge of Culture. In 2003 the TJN performed their first foreign piece with Aeschylus' play Prometheus bound. A Kurdish adaption of the South African Athol Fugards Island in 2004 and the Accidental Death of an Anarchist by Dario Fo in 2005 were other foreign adaptions.
