= Kazim Öz =

Kurdish film director, scriptwriter and producer

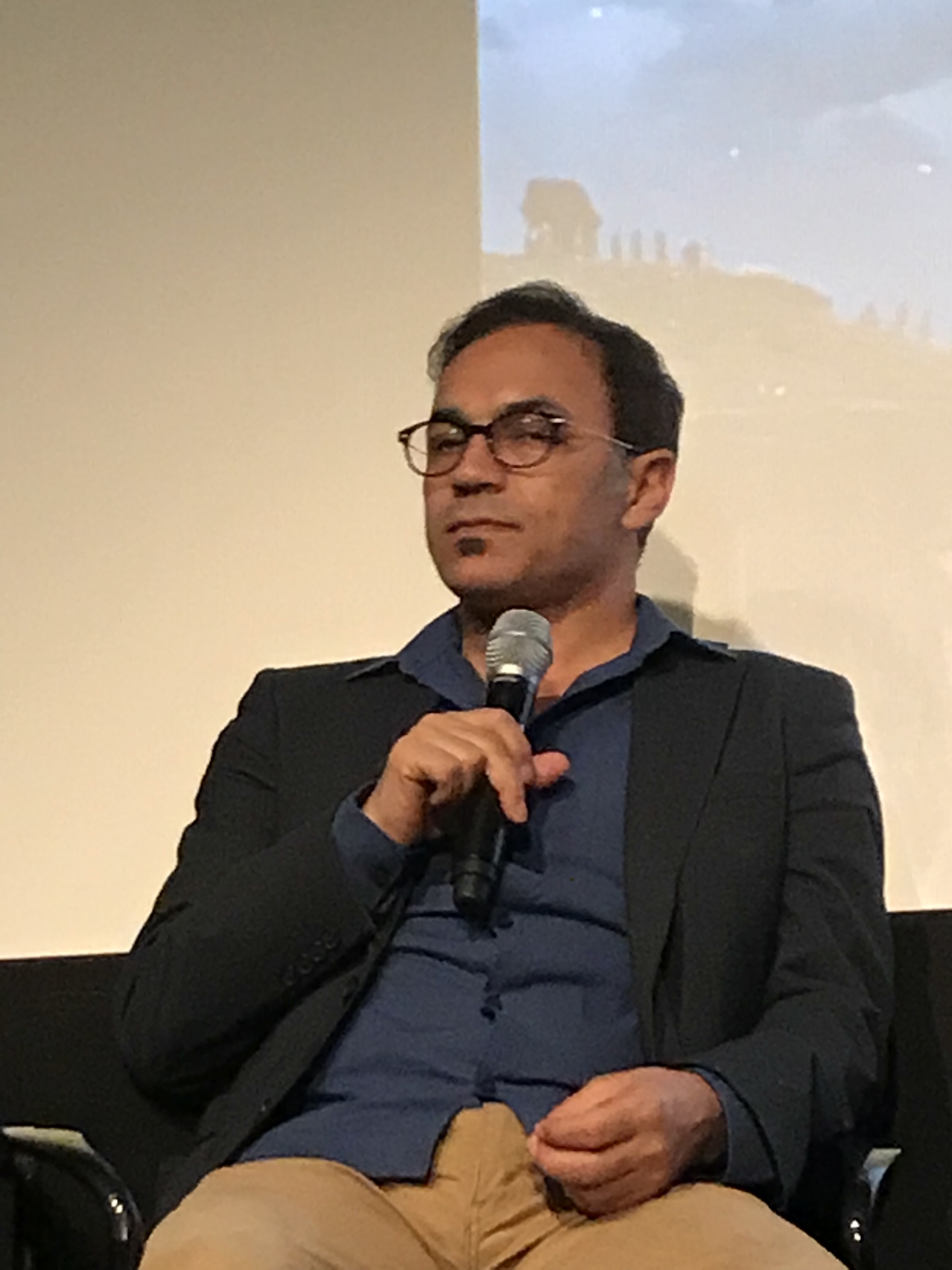
Kazim Öz at New York University's Cantor Center

Kazim Öz (born 1973 in Dersim) is a Kurdish film director, scriptwriter and producer. In 1992 he began acting at Teatra Jiyana Nû, while also working on movies.

== Early life and education ==
Kazim Öz lived in the countryside in the Dersim region until he was seventeen years old. In his childhood he took care of the families goats. He studied civil engineering at the Yildiz Technical University in Istanbul, and following Television and Cinema at the Marmara University, from where he also received his master's degree in 2003. His first documentary Destên Me Wê Bibin Bask Emê Bifirin Herin... was released in 1996. Since 1996, he was involved in the activities of the movie department of the Mesopotamia Culture Center, which today is known as the Mesopotamian Cinema Collective.

== Professional career ==
Since 1996 until today he stayed attached to the films. His most acclaimed movies are Bahoz, Zer, Son Mevsim: Şavaklar (Documentary) amongst others. Kazim Öz's movies often get censored. The movie Ax got first censored and then banned by the Turkish Ministry of Culture and Tourism. When the film was to be shipped from Turkey to Europe, the courier was detained and suspected of being a sympathizer of the Kurdistan Workers Party (PKK), which is an illegal organization in Turkey. Following the film having been screened successfully on several European festivals, the ban on the film Ax was also lifted in Turkey. The movie The Photograph was removed from a film festival in Poland due to the intervention of the Ministry of Culture and Tourism, who was a sponsor of the Film Festival. Kazım Öz's movie Zer premiered at the 36th Istanbul Film Festival in April 2017. The movie included two censored scenes by the Ministry of Culture and Tourism, which he blacked out. In November 2022, his film Elif Ana premiered in Paris.

=== Prosecution ===
In November 2018 he was detained by the Turkish authorities and charged with membership in an illegal organization, but released after two days. He then left Turkey. In September 2019 the Turkish juridical authorities made public that the prosecution seeks a sentence between seven and a half and fifteen years for Öz.

== Filmography ==
- Elif Ana,123 min (2022)
- Bir Kar Tanesinin Ömrü (The Life of a Snowflake), 110 min (2022)
- Zer, 120 min (2017)
- Beyaz Çınar (White Scyamore), 83 min. (2016)
- Bir Varmış Bir Yokmuş (Once Upon A Time), 80 min. (2014)
- Son Mevsim: Şavaklar (Last season), 90 min. (2010), with the support of Arte
- Bahoz (The Strom),155 min. (2008)
- Dûr (Distant), 74 min. (2005)
- The Fotograf, 67min. (2001)
- Ax (Toprak), (The Land), 27 min. (1999)
- Güneşe Yolculuk (Journey to the Sun), (1998)
- Destên Me Wê Bibin Bask Emê Bifirin Herin..., 27 min. (1996)

== Awards ==
Ax (The Land)

- 1999 Best Short Film, – Cortometraggio 99, Milano International Film Festival / Italy
- 1999 François O’de Awards, Hamburg International Short Film / Germany
- 2000 Special Jury Award, Huesca International Film Festival / Spain
- 2000 Best Short Film, Modena International Human Rights Film Festival / Italy
- 2000 Best Short Film, M. Orhon Ariburnu Awards / Turkey
- 2001 Best Short Film, Tebessa International Film Festival / Algeria

Fotograf (The Photograph)

- 2001 Best Feature-Length Film, Milano International Film Festival / Italy
- 2002 Best Feature-Length Film, Trieste International Film Festival / Italy
- 2002 Special Jury Award, Arıburnu Cinema Awards / Turkey
- 2002 Special Jury Award, Valencia Cinema Jove / Spain
- 2003 Foresight Prize for Democracy and Human Rights, Nürnberg Interforum Film Festival / Germany
- 2003 Bridge Prize, Private-Look International Film Festival / Armenia

Dûr (The Far)

- 2004 Best Documentary, Nürnberg Interforum Film Festival / Germany
- 2006 Best Documentary, Ankara International Film Festival / Turkey

Bahoz (The Storm)

- 2009 Best Young Actor (Cahit Gök, leading actor), Ankara International Film Festival / Turkey

Demsala Dawi: Şewaxan (The Last Season: Shawaks)

- 2009 International Special Private Jury Award, 58. Mannheim International Film Festival / Germany
- 2009 Best Documentary, International Ankara Film Festival / Turkey

He Bû Tune Bû (Once Upon A Time)

- 2014 Librarie's Award, 36. Cinema Du Reel International Documentary Film Festival / France
- 2014 FIPRESCI Award, 33. Istanbul International Film Festival / Turkey
- 2014 Special Mention of Jury, 33. Istanbul International Film Festival / Turkey
- 2014 Special Jury Award, 25. Ankara International Film Festival / Turkey
- 2014 Best International Feature, Montreal International Documentary Festival (RIDM) / Canada
- 2015 Special Jury Award, Nurnberg Film Festival / Germany
- 2015 Best International Feature, FILMES DO HOMEM – Melgaço International Documentary Festival / Portugal
- 2015 The Special Mention Award, Duhok International Film Festival / Iraq
- 2015 Special Jury Award, Apricot Tree International Ethno Film Festival / Armenia
- 2015 Saratov Harmony Award, Saratov Sufferings International Film Festival / Russia
- 2015 Special Jury Award, Gold Laurel Film Festival / Turkey

ZER

- 2017 The Audience Award, 66. Mannheim – Heidelberg Film Festival / Germany
- 2017 The FIPRESCI Award, 66. Mannheim – Heidelberg Film Festival / Germany
- 2017 The Audience Award, 23. Nancy International Film Festival / France
- 2017 Opening Film, 5. Duhok International Film Festival / Iraq
