= Zer (film) =

2017 film by Kazim Öz

- Directed by: Kazim Öz
- Starring: Nik Xhelilaj; Güler Ökten; Füsun Demirel; Haleigh Ciel; Levent Özdilek
- Release date: 21 April 2017
- Running time: 113 minutes
- Country: Turkey
- Languages: Kurdish; Turkish

Zer is a 2017 drama film directed by Kazim Öz. The film is about the experiences of a young Turkish musical student who gets to know his Kurdish grandmother as she comes to New York for treatment.

== Plot ==
Jan is a student in musicology in New York and has a strained relationship with his father. His grandmother comes to New York to receive cancer treatment and Jan often visits her in the hospital. His grandmother sings him the song "Zer" and becomes captivated by its melody. After his grandmother dies and Jan and his father attend the funeral in Turkey, Jan decides to stay and solve the mystery around the song. It leads him to a journey to the land of his ancestors and of what they experienced during the Dersim Massacre. In search of the origins of the song, he gets to know a Dengbêj singer and a rebel in the woods.

== Production ==
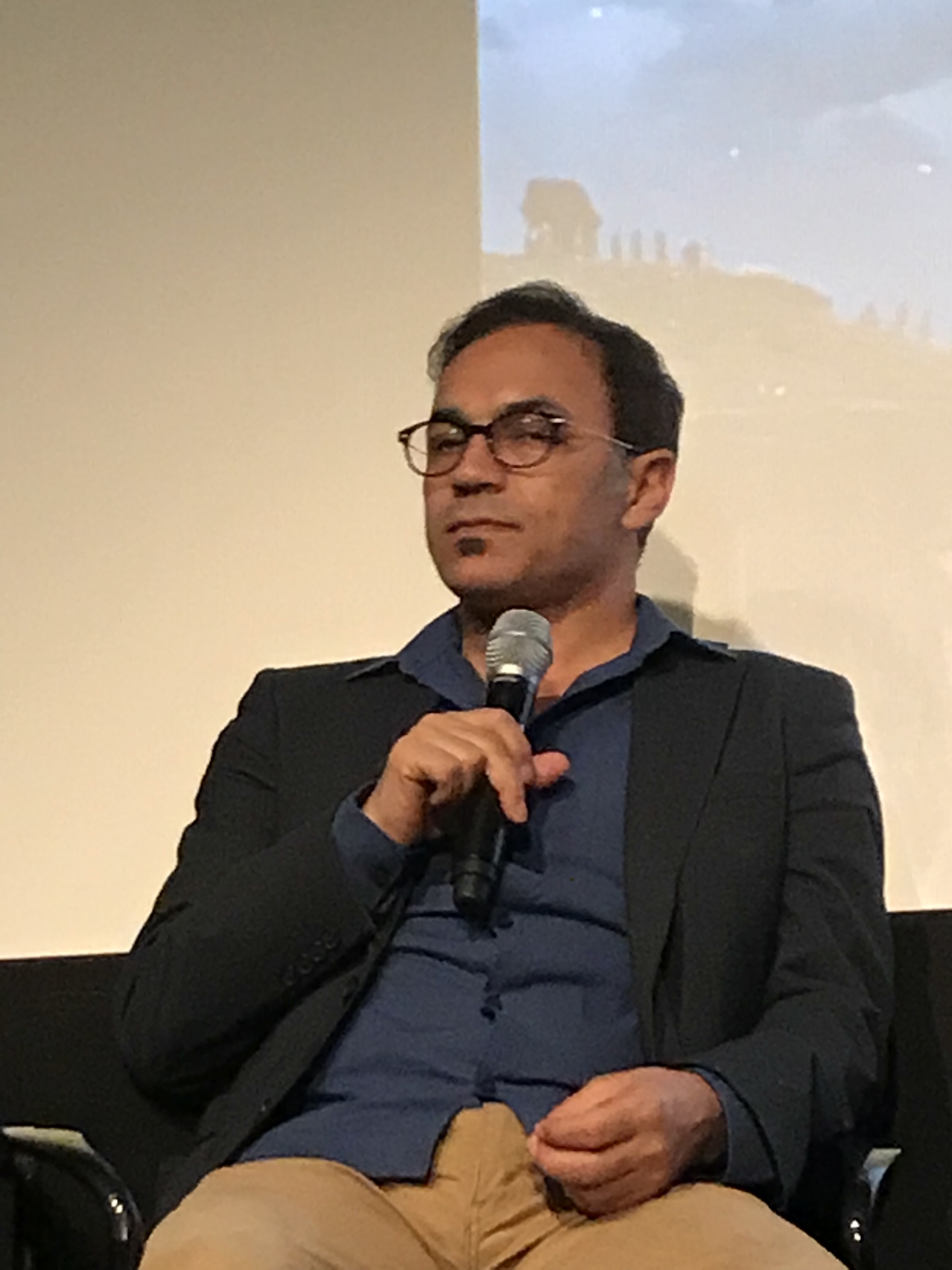
Kazim Öz at the screening of Zer

First it received financing by the Turkish Ministry of Culture, but during the transcurse of the production, the support was withdrawn. The movie was filmed in New York, United States and also in the provinces of Istanbul, Erzincan, Tunceli, Elazıg in Turkey.

== Censorship ==
The movie received a certificate to be screened in Turkey by the Ministry of Culture in 2014. But in 2017, the Ministry requested scenes on the Dersim Massacre to be removed. The movie premiered at the 36th İstanbul Film Festival in April 2017 in a censored version which included blacked out frames for the duration of the relevant scenes covered with a message that the scenes were deemed inconvenient by the Ministry of Culture. Following, his certificate was annulled. Many movie theaters in Turkey cancelled the screenings, at the end only 11 movie theaters in Turkey showed the film.

== Cast ==
- Nik Xhelilaj
- Güler Ökten
- Füsun Demirel
- Haleigh Ciel
- Levent Özdilek
