= International Digital Emmy Awards =

- Awarded for: Digital platforms
- Country: USA
- Presented by: IATAS
- First award: March 30, 2009
- Website: www.iemmys.tv

The International Digital Emmy Awards recognise excellence in content created and designed for viewer interaction and/or delivery on a digital platform (i.e. interactive TV, mobile, Internet, etc.) originating outside of the United States, and are presented annually since 2009 by International Academy of Television Arts and Sciences. The announcement of the winners takes place at MIPTV in Cannes, France.

== Award categories ==
In addition to the presentation of the International Digital Emmy Awards for Children and Young People, Fiction, and Non-Fiction. The International Academy will present a special award – the Pioneer Prize, which is not an Emmy but rather a special initiative from the Academy which honors an industry personality or organization.

- Digital Program: Children and Young People
- Digital Program: Fiction
- Digital Program: Non-Fiction
