= Rebecca Cremona =

Maltese film director, screenwriter and producer

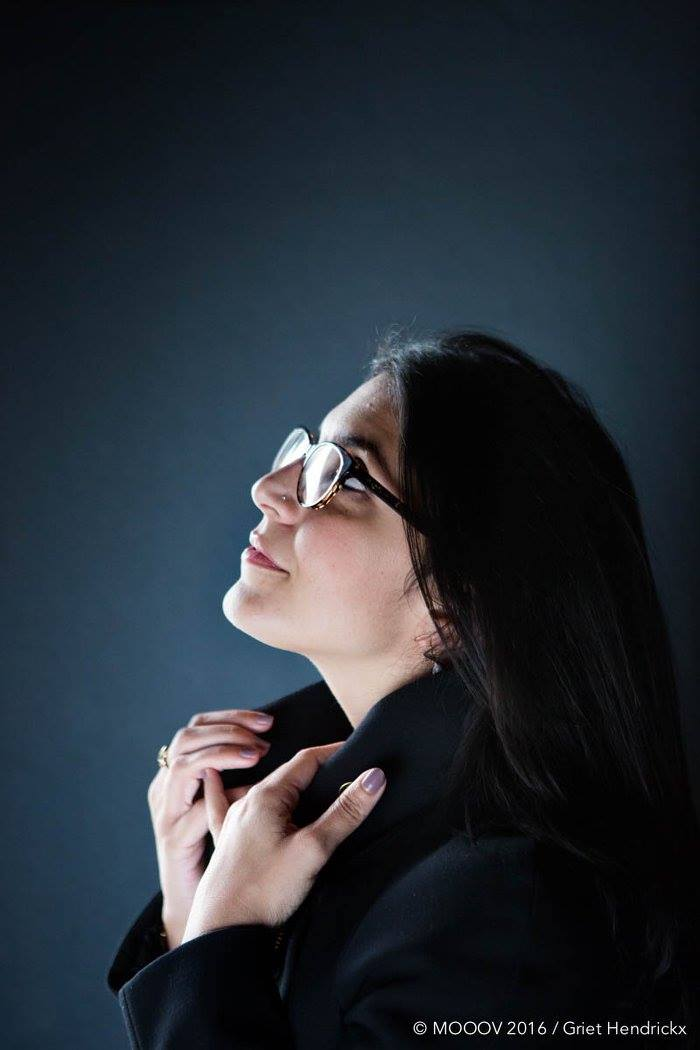
- Occupations: Director; Writer; Producer
- Organization: Kukumajsa Productions Ltd.
- Website: https://kukumajsa.com

Rebecca Cremona is a Maltese film director, screenwriter and producer. Her debut feature film, Simshar, was the first Maltese film to be submitted for the Academy Award for Best Foreign Language Film. In 2020, Cremona was honoured with the Order of Merit from the President of Malta for her contributions to the island's cultural sphere.

== Education ==
Cremona obtained a BFA (Hons) in Film and Comparative Literature from the University of Warwick, UK, and attended the directing MFA at the American Film Institute in Los Angeles where she made three short films, amongst them Mended Spectacle, and production designed two others. On Mended Spectacle, Frank Pierson remarked that it is, "A daring and challenging piece of storytelling, marvellously staged and photographed, first-class acting ... the director's sure hand in capturing the nuances is a joy to see and feel."

She obtained her MFA (Hons) from Art Center College of Design. There, Cremona wrote and directed Magdalene (2009) which went on to win a Student EMMY and a Directors Guild of America award. Academy Award winning cinematographer and director, Janusz Kamiński said of Cremona's short film, "Magdalene is unparalleled in beauty and sensibility."

== Career ==
Early in her career, Cremona worked on a number of films shot in Malta, most notably Munich and Agora. In 2010, Cremona established Kukumajsa Productions, a production company under which Magdalene was produced, and four years later, the company's first feature film, Simshar (2014). Among Kukumajsa's achievements is its contribution to Malta's successful bid for the European Capital for Culture - Valletta 2018.

Cremona's debut feature film, Simshar is inspired by true events. Simshar tells the tragic story of five fishing crew members who get stranded after their fishing boat capsizes. The film was submitted for consideration for the Best Foreign Language Film at the 87th Academy Awards, the first ever Maltese film to be submitted for this award. Simshar is widely referred to as the first ever Maltese international feature film.

Cremona has adapted for the screen Juliana Maio's novel, City of the Sun for Sara Risher (known for A Nightmare on Elm Street and Hairspray), and was commissioned to write The Crossing for Samson Films and Boudica Films.

In 2021, Kukumajsa Productions was the first Maltese company to be awarded Creative Europe MEDIA funds, which helped Cremona develop a number of projects.

An extension to her film work, Cremona has guest lectured and been interviewed at various schools and universities including the University of Malta, Warwick University, Queen Mary University of London, Cornell University, and the American University in Washington D.C. Since 2023, she has also served on the board of the Malta Producers' Association (MPA).

== Activism ==
In 2019, Rebecca co-founded the Cottonera resident group Azzjoni: Tuna Artna Lura, which is dedicated to safeguarding public open spaces and heritage in the densely populated historical Three Cities localities of Malta.

Amongst other initiatives, the resident group spearheaded the successful appeal campaign against the building up of three key open spaces.
