= List of Dominican Republic films =

This is a list of films produced in, set in, or related to the Dominican Republic, in chronological order.

== 1910s ==
Year	Title	Director	Cast	Genre	Notes	Refs
1915	Excursión de José de Diego en Santo Domingo	Rafael Colorado		Documentary	First film made in the Dominican Republic by a foreigner (Colorado was Puerto Rican); about José de Diego	

== 1920s ==
Year	Title	Director	Cast	Genre	Notes	Refs
1923	La Leyenda de Nuestra Señora de Altagracia	Francisco Arturo Palau	Alma Zolessi, José B. Peynado Soler, Fernando Ravelo, Panchito Palau, Pedro Troncoso Sánchez	Drama	First fiction film in Dominican cinema	
1923	La República Dominicana	Francisco Arturo Palau		Documentary		
1924	La emboscadas de Cupido	Francisco Arturo Palau	Delia Weber, Rafael Paíno Pichardo, Evangelina Landestoy, Pedro Troncoso Sánchez	Comedy		

== 1930s—1960s ==
Few films were produced within the Dominican Republic under the dictatorship of Rafael Trujillo (1930-1961).

Year	Title	Director	Cast	Genre	Notes	Refs
1947	Marcha del trabajo	Rudy Unger		Propaganda	Film promoting Trujillo's reelection	
1948	Palmas dominicanas	Rudy Unger		Propaganda		
1958	Ganadería: Riqueza nacional	Manuel Báez		Propaganda	Documentary about cattle raising; first Dominican documentary in 35mm and in color	
1961	La Gesta Libertadora del 30 de Mayo	Hugo Mateo		Documentary		
1963	La Silla	Franklin Domínguez	Camilo Carrau	Drama	First Dominican production made after the fall of Rafael Trujillo	
1968	El esfuerzo de un pueblo	Eduardo Palmer and Max Pou		Documentary		
1969	Carnaval	Ricardo Thormann and Max Pou		Documentary	Made to encourage tourism in the Dominican Republic	

== 1970s ==
Year	Title	Director	Cast	Genre	Notes	Refs
1970	Santo Domingo: Cuna de América	Max Pou		Documentary		
1973	La serpiente de la luna de los piratas	Jean-Louis Jorge	Jonna Ruiz, Sylvia Morales, Dagoberto López and Eddie Rosado	Drama	Won the Cinéma d'aujourd'hui at the Toulon Youth Film Festival	
1974	The Godfather Part II	Francis Ford Coppola	Al Pacino, Robert De Niro, and Robert Duvall	Crime drama	Scenes set in Cuba were filmed in the Dominican Republic	
1975	El clan de los inmorales	José Gutiérrez Maesso	Helmut Berger, Sydne Rome and Kevin McCarthy	Drama		
1975	Pantaleón y las visitadoras	José María Gutiérrez Santos and Mario Vargas Llosa	José Sacristán, Rafaela Aparicio and Rosa Carmina	Drama		
1976	Lengua azul	Max Pou		Documentary		
1976	Los dueños del sol	Max Pou		Documentary	Also known as Fondo negro	
1977	Sorcerer	William Friedkin	Roy Scheider, Bruno Cremer and Francisco Rabal	Thriller	Filmed in the Dominican Republic	
1977	Dulcemente morirás por amor	Tulio Demicheli	Andrés García and Rossy Mendoza	Thriller	Co-production of Mexico, Colombia, Spain and the Dominican Republic; also called La llamada del sexo	
1977	Crisis	Onofre de la Rosa		Documentary	Economic and military aggression against the UASD under Joaquín Balaguer	
1978	Siete días con el pueblo	Jimmy Sierra		Documentary	About the 1974 Siete días con el pueblo music festival	
1978	Rumbo al poder	José Bujosa		Documentary	About the 1978 Dominican Republic general election	
1979	Apocalypse Now	Francis Ford Coppola	Martin Sheen, Marlon Brando and Robert Duvall	War drama	Several scenes from the movie were filmed in the Dominican Republic	

== 1980s ==
Year	Title	Director	Cast	Genre	Notes	Refs
1981	Carnival y mascas	Pedro Guzmán Cordero		Documentary	Folklore, particularly regarding carnival, in the Dominican Republic	
1981	El mundo mágico de Gilberto Hernández Ortega	Agliberto Meléndez		Documentary	About Gilberto Hernández Ortega	
1981	Lumiantena	Máximo Rodríguez and Martín López		Documentary	Originally created as López's bachelor's thesis at UASD; it was rejected	
1983	Guaguasi	Jorge Ulla	Orestes Matacena, Marilyn Pupo and Raimundo Hidalgo-Gato	Drama/comedy	Romance during the Cuban Revolution; filmed in the Dominican Republic	
1983	El valle de San Juan	Claudio Chea		Documentary	About ecological preservation	
1983	El paseo de la Virgen	Claudio Chea		Documentary	About traditions in Palmar de Ocoa	
1985	Tras las huellas de Palau	René Fortunato	René Fortunato	Documentary	The history of the first Dominican filmmaker, Francisco Palau	
1985	A golpe de heroísmo	Tommy García		Documentary	About the April Revolution; produced by the Dominican Left Front	
1985	Camino al Pico Duarte	Claudio Chea	Juan Canela and René Alfonso	Documentary	About deforestation	
1985	La ruta de la libertad	Pericles Mejía and José Luis Sáez		Documentary	About Máximo Gómez	
1987	Algo en común	Jean-Louis Jorge		Documentary	About composer Julio Alberto Hernández	
1987	Imagenes de un artista	René Fortunato		Documentary	About plastic artist Frank Almánzar	
1988	Abril: La trinchera del honor	René Fortunato		Documentary	About the Dominican Civil War winner of the best Caribbean documentary at the 1990 San Juan Film Festival	
1988	Un príncipe se confiesa	Juan Delancer		Documentary	About Octavio Antonio Beras Rojas, the first Dominican cardinal	
1988	Un pasaje de Ida	Agliberto Meléndez	Carlos Alfredo, Ángel Muñiz and Ángel Haché	Drama	Based on a 1980 event wherein several Dominicans suffocated onboard a ship while attempting to migrate illegally. The film was submitted to the 61st Academy Awards.	
1988	Tráfico de niños	Alfonso Rodríguez	Alfonso Rodríguez, Bernardita García Smester, Juan María Almonte and Milagros Rosado	Drama	TV movie	
1989	Cat Chaser	Abel Ferrara	Peter Weller and Kelly McGillis	Drama	About a veteran of the US occupation who returns to the Dominican Republic in search of the woman who saved his life	

== 1990s ==
Year	Title	Director	Cast	Genre	Notes	Refs
1990	Caribe	René Fortunato		Documentary	About salsa	
1990	El banco de palo	Carlos Andújar		Documentary	About a cult in Villa Mella	
1991	Trujillo: El Poder del Jefe	René Fortunato	René Alfonso	Documentary	About Rafael Trujillo	
1992	Sopla, Tavito, sopla	Leo Silverio		Documentary	About saxophonist Tito Vásquez	
1994	Trujillo: El Poder del Jefe II	René Fortunato	René Alfonso	Documentary		
1995	Nueba Yol: ¡Por Fin Llegó Balbuena!	Ángel Muñiz	Luisito Marti, Caridad Ravelo and Raúl Carbonell	Comedy		
1995	Victor	Freddy Vargas		Mockumentary	Short film made while Vargas was a student at St. John's University; won multiple awards and was shown at film festivals including at Telluride	
1996	Azúcar amarga	Leon Ichaso	Rene Lavan and Mayte Vilán	Romantic drama	American-Dominican co-production; filmed in Santo Domingo	
1996	Cuatro hombres y un ataúd	Pericles Mejía	Cuquín Victoria, Géraldine Danon and Rafael Villalona	Comedy		
1996	Bravo Molina	Juan Delancer		Documentary	About José Antonio Molina	
1996	Para Vivir o Morir	Radel Villalona and José Romay	José Antonio Rodríguez, Marco Leonardo, Caridad Ravelo and María Castillo	Drama		
1996	Trujillo: El Poder del Jefe III	René Fortunato	René Alfonso	Documentary	About Rafael Trujillo	
1997	Buscando Un Sueño	Joseph Medina, Jaime Piña and David Castillo	Victor Checo, Rafael Decen, Lauren Vélez and Kamar de los Reyes	Drama	Screenplay by Freddy Vargas and Joseph Medina	
1997	Caimoní	René Fortunato		Documentary		
1997	Nueba Yol 3: Bajo la Nueva Ley	Ángel Muñiz	Luisito Martí, Raúl Carbonell, Graciela Mas and Jorge Pupo	Comedy		
1997	María Montez	Jean-Louis Jorge		Documentary	About Maria Montez	
1997	Eduardo Brito	Jean-Louis Jorge		Documentary	About singer Eduardo Brito	
1998	Balaguer: La Herencia del Tirano	René Fortunato		Documentary	About Joaquín Balaguer	

== 2000s ==
Year	Title	Director	Cast	Genre	Notes	Refs
2000	El Círculo Vicioso	Nelson Peña	Rafael Decena, Felix Solis and Mickey Albuquerque	Action		
2001	In the Time of the Butterflies	Mariano Barroso	Salma Hayek, Lumi Cavazos, Marc Anthony and Edward James Olmos	Drama	About the Mirabal sisters	
2001	My American Girls: A Dominican Story	Aaron Matthews		Documentary	About a Dominican-American family in Brooklyn	
2002	Washington Heights	Alfredo De Villa	Vanessa Ferlito and Carlos León Escudero	Drama	Winner of several awards including the Feature Film Award at the Austin Film Festival	
2003	Cuba libre	Juan Gerard	Harvey Keitel, Gael García Bernal, Iben Hjejle and Diana Bracho	Drama	Set during the Cuban Revolution; filmed in the Dominican Republic	
2003	Éxito por intercambio	Miguel Vásquez	Rafael Alduey, Ánthony Alvarez and Georgina Duluc	Drama		
2003	El misterio Galíndez	Gerardo Herrero	Saffron Burrows, Harvey Keitel, Eduard Fernández and Guillermo Toledo	Political drama	About the 1956 disappearance of Jesús de Galíndez	
2003	Luis Vargas: Santo Domingo Blues	Alex Wolfe	Luis Vargas	Documentary	About bachata and Vargas' career	
2003	Pasaporte Rojo	Albert Xavier	Frank Molina, Frank Medrano and Sharon Angela	Drama	Based on an original story by Freddy Vargas	
2003	Perico Ripiao	Ángel Muñiz	Raymond Pozo, Manolo Ozuna and Phillip Rodríguez	Comedy		
2003	Pirates of the Caribbean: The Curse of the Black Pearl	Gore Verbinski	Johnny Depp, Geoffrey Rush and Orlando Bloom	Action/adventure		
2003	Balaguer: La violencia del poder	René Fortunato		Documentary	About Joaquín Balaguer	
2004	La cárcel de la Victoria: El cuarto hombre	José Enrique Pintor	Paco Luque, Julio Mota and Richard Douglas	Drama		
2004	Negocios son negocios	Jorge De Bernardi	Irving Alberti, Nuryn Sanlley and Karina Larrauri	Comedy		
2004	A Different Man	Albert Xavier	Amarfis, Michelle Méndez and Kelvin Vargas	Comedy		
2004	Quarter to Ten	Albert Xavier	Mariluz Acosta, David Matos and Frank Perozo	Drama		
2004	La Ruta	David Cavada Oruña	Pablo Ferrer, Henry Mercedes and Johnnie Mercedes	Drama	Short film	
2004	Soy: Johnny Ventura	Guillermo Cordero	Johnny Ventura	Documentary		
2005	Andrea: La Venganza del Espíritu	Rogert Bencosme	Anny Ferreiras	Horror		
2005	El Delivery	Juan Castillo	Chayanne Rodriguez, Francesca Alvarez and Marilyn Beck	Drama	Short aired 134 times on HBO	
2005	La fiesta del chivo	Luis Llosa	Tomas Milian, Isabella Rossellini and Paul Freeman	Drama		
2005	Los locos también piensan	Humberto Castellanos	Luisito Martí, Celines Toribio and Felipe Polanco	Action		
2005	Un rollo en la arena	Félix Manuel Lora Robles		Documentary	About Dominican cinema	
2005	La maldición del padre Cardona	Félix Germán	Zoe Saldaña, Anthony Álvarez and Carlota Carretero	Comedy/romance		
2005	Princesas	Fernando León de Aranoa	Candela Peña and Micaela Nevárez	Drama	About a friendship between two sex workers, one from Spain and one from the Dominican Republic	
2005	El secreto de Neguri	Luis Arambilet, Pedro Guzmán and Esteban Martin	Luis Arambilet, Patricia Ascuasiati and Esperanza De Alvarez	Drama		
2005	Secuestro	Juan Castillo	Orestes Amador, Leidi Luna and Elvis Nolasco	Drama	New York University graduate film program awards: writing, producing, editing, acting and directing	
2005	Universidad de Santo Domingo, Primada de América	Ángel Ruiz-Bazán		Documentary	Produced by the Faculty of Arts at Universidad Autónoma de Santo Domingo	
2005	Where There Is No Water	Jonathan Muller		Documentary		
2006	The Good Shepherd	Robert De Niro	Matt Damon, Angelina Jolie and Robert De Niro	Drama/thriller	A spy film about the United States and Cuba; partially filmed in the Dominican Republic	
2006	Un macho de mujer	Alfonso Rodríguez	Roberto Ángel Salcedo, Anabell Alberto and Tania Báez	Comedy		
2006	Miami Vice	Michael Mann	Colin Farrell, Jamie Foxx and Gong Li	Action/thriller	Filmed in the Dominican Republic	
2006	Patricia: el regreso del sueño	René Fortunato	Juan Maria Almonte, Augusto Feria and Miguel Pérez Santana	Drama		
2006	Lilís	Jimmy Sierra	Juan Maria Almonte, Reynaldo Disla and Franklin Domínguez	Historical drama	About the life of Ulises Heureaux	
2006	El Sistema	Humberto Espinal	Osvaldo Añez, Luís Báez and William Díaz	Action		
2006	El Sofa	Nathalie Pérez	Amauta Di Marco, Lorraine Ferrand and Esar Simo		Short	
2006	La tragedia Llenas: Un código 666	Elias Acosta	Frank Perozo, Orestes Amador and Josué Guerrero	Drama	Based on the murder of José Llenas Aybar	
2006	Vals	Luis Arambilet		Musical	Short; Official Selection, Rainier International Film Festival (RIFF) 2007	
2006	La Suerte	Luis Arambilet		Drama	Short; Official Selection and Award Nominee for Best Foreign Language Film, San Fernando Valley International Film Festival (VIFFI) 2007	
2006	Viajeros	Carlos Bidó	Frank Perozo, Richard Douglas and Nashla Bogaert	Drama	About illegal immigration	
2007	Angel of Death 2: The Prison Island Massacre	Andreas Bethmann	Natascha Farrel, Lina Romay and Erich Amerkamp	Horror	Filmed in the Dominican Republic	
2007	Chocolate Country	Robin Blotnick		Documentary	About Dominican cacao farmers; won the Grand Jury Prize at the Seattle International Film Festival	
2007	Un pueblo con alma de carnaval	Fernando Báez Mella		Documentary	About the roots of carnival in the Dominican Republic	
2007	Love Wrecked	Randal Kleiser	Amanda Bynes, Chris Carmack, Jonathan Bennett and Jamie-Lynn Sigler	Romantic comedy		
2007	Mi novia está de madre	Archie Lopez	Roberto Ángel Salcedo, Patricia Manterola and Eddy Herrera	Comedy		
2007	Sanky Panky	José Enrique Pintor	Fausto Mata, Zdenka Kalina and Tony Pascual	Comedy	Shown at the 24th Chicago Latino Film Festival in 2008	
2007	Operación Patakón	Tito Nekerman	Sergio Carlo, Antonio Melenciano, Carlos Lozano and Andrea Peña	Comedy		
2007	Yuniol	Alfonso Rodríguez	Shalim Ortiz, Frank Perozo and Hemky Madera	Drama		
2007	Hispaniola	Freddy Vargas	Sharlene Taulé, Sergio Bosi, Jhonmerie Marion, Henssy Pichardo	Drama	Short; Winner of the 2007 HBO/New York International Latino Film Festival Short Film Competition. Shown on HBO Latino for one year after its original run on HBO on Demand.	
2007	La mujer de Columbus Circle	Freddy Vargas	Romi Dias, Fidel Vicioso and Mateo Gomez	Supernatural thriller	Based on Franklin Gutierrez's gothic short story	
2008	60 millas al este	Jorge Lendeborg		Docudrama	About illegal immigration	
2008	Al fin y al cabo	Alfonso Rodríguez	Marcos Bonetti, Miguel Céspedes and Francisco Cruz	Comedy		
2008	Las Sufragistas	Martha Checo		Documentary	About Dominican suffragists	
2008	Brigada explosiva: misión pirata	Rodolfo Ledo	Emilio Disi, Luciana Salazar and Gino Renni	Mystery	Filmed in the Dominican Republic	
2008	El caballero de la medianoche	Jimmy Sierra	Roberto Payano and Wallis Uribe	Thriller		
2008	Enigma	Robert Cornelio	Yorlla Lina Castillo, Mario Arturo Hernández and Fifi Almonte	Suspense/horror		
2008	Excexos	José María Cabral	César León López, Zeny Leyva and Laura García-Godoy	Drama		
2008	Ladrones a domicilio	Ángel Muñiz	Rafael Alduey, Juan Maria Almonte and Miguel Bucarelly	Adventure		
2008	Pinchos y Rolos	Freddy Vargas	Laura Gómez, Fidel Vicioso and Anthony Álvarez	Comedy/musical	Short film	
2008	Playball	Alfonso Rodríguez	Luis Jose López, Marlene Favela and Hemky Madera	Drama	About Dominican baseball players trying to make it to the Major Leagues	
2008	Rumbo a las Grandes Ligas	Jared Goodman	David Ortiz and Vladimir Guerrero	Documentary	About Dominican children who rely on baseball as a way out of poverty	
2008	Santi Clo... La vaina de la Navidad	José Enrique Pintor	Aquiles Correa, Manolo Ozuna and Elisa Abreu	Comedy		
2008	Sugar	Anna Boden and Ryan Fleck	Algenis Pérez Soto, Rayniel Rufino and Andre Holland	Drama	About a baseball player's journey from the farm to the MLB	
2008	¡De Campamento!	José García	Omar Payano, Ramses Cairo and Nancy Amancio	Comedy		
2009	Cristiano de la Secreta	Archie López	Raymond Pozo and Nashla Bogaert	Comedy		
2009	Los Bandoleros	Vin Diesel	Vin Diesel, Sung Kang, Michelle Rodriguez, F. Valentino Morales and Celines Toribio	Action	20-minute prequel to Fast & Furious; filmed entirely in the Dominican Republic	
2009	Fast & Furious	Justin Lin	Vin Diesel, Paul Walker, Michelle Rodriguez, Jordana Brewster, John Ortiz and Laz Alonso	Action	Set in the Dominican Republic	
2009	Mujeres extraordinarias: Mujeres en el tiempo, mujeres sin tiempo	Yildalina Tatem Brache	Gladys Gutiérrez, Josefina Padilla, Sina Cabral, Dedé Mirabal, Mary Marranzini, Ivelisse Prats and Rosaflor Tatem	Documentary	About influential women from the Dominican Republic	
2009	La Soga	Josh Crook	Manny Pérez, Denise Quiñones and Juan Fernández	Action	About government corruption and justice	
2009	Bosch: Presidente en la frontera imperial	René Fortunato		Documentary	About Juan Bosch	
2009	Mega Diva	Roberto Ángel Salcedo	Jessika Grau, Roberto Ángel Salcedo and Irvin Alberti	Comedy		

== 2010s ==
Year	Title	Director	Cast	Genre	Notes	Refs
2010	Trópico de sangre	Juan Delancer	Michelle Rodriguez, Juan Fernández and Sergio Carlo	Historical drama	About the Mirabal sisters	
2011	3 al rescate	Jorge Morillo and Luis Morillo	Kenny Grullón, Luís José Germán and Roger Zayas	Adventure	The first animated film made entirely in the Dominican Republic	
2011	La hija natural	Leticia Tonos	Julietta Rodriguez and Victor Checo	Drama		
2012	Jaque Mate	José María Cabral	Adrián Mas, Frank Perozo, Marcos Bonetti and Michelle Vargas	Drama/thriller		
2012	Feo de día, lindo de noche	Alfonso Rodríguez	Fausto Mata and Frank Perozo	Comedy		
2012	Lotoman 2.0	Archie López	Miguel Céspedes, Raymond Pozo and Fernando Carrillo	Comedy		
2012	El hoyo del diablo	Francis Disla	Martha Gonzáles and Juan Fernández	Horror		
2012	Lío de falda	Miguel Vásquez	Phillip Rodríguez, Fernando Rordríguez and Raúl Carbonell	Comedy		
2012	El Rey de Najayo	Fernando Báez Mella	Manny Pérez	Drama	About a drug trafficker	
2012	La lucha de Ana	Bladimir Abud	Cheddy García	Drama		
2012	La casa del kilómetro 5	Omar Javier	Negra Agramonte and John Distrito	Horror		
2013	Cristo Rey	Leticia Tonos	Akari Endo, Yasser Michelén and James Saintil	Drama		
2013	Profe por accidente	Roberto Ángel Salcedo	Fausto Mata and Robert Ángel Salcedo	Comedy		
2013	A ritmo de fe	José Gómez	Hayrold Abreu, Loraida Bobadilla, Vladimir Acevedo and Laura Isabel Fernández	Drama	About a dancer who attends a prestigious dance academy in Santo Domingo	
2013	Los super	Bladimir Abud	Cheddy García, Manolo Ozuna, Alan Brio and Cuquín Victoria	Comedy		
2013	Arrobá	José María Cabral	Irvin Alberti, Kenny Grullón, Alexis Valdés and Hony Estrella	Comedy		
2013	El teniente Amado	Félix Limardo	Amaury Nolasco	Historical drama	About Amado García Guerrero's decision to join the group that later overthrew Rafael Trujillo	
2013	Mi angelito favorito	Alfonso Rodríguez	Carmen Rodríguez, Irvin Alberti, Manolo Ozuna and Cheddy García	Comedy		
2013	¿Quién manda?	Ronni Castillo	Frank Perozo and Nashla Bogaert	Romantic comedy		
2013	Ponchao	Josh Crook	Manny Pérez	Comedy		
2013	La montaña	Tabaré Blanchard and Iván Herrera	Karim Mella, Iván Gómez and Federico Jovine	Documentary	About the first Dominicans to reach the top of Mt Everest	
2013	Sanky Panky 2	José Enrique Pintor	Fausto Mata, Tony Pascual and Aquiles Correa	Comedy		
2013	El gallo	Juan Fernández	Johnnie Mercedes, Juan Fernández and Katherine Castro	Drama	About a Dominican man deported by the United States after serving a 25-year prison sentence	
2013	Biodegradable	Juan Basanta	Hemky Madera, Ángel Hache and Liche Ariza	Drama/science fiction		
2013	Noche de circo	Alan Nadal Piantini	Richard Douglas, Alan Nadal Piantini, Alfonso Rodríguez and Pericles Mejía	Drama		
2014	Dólares de arena	Laura Amelia Guzmán and Israel Cárdenas	Geraldine Chaplin, Yanet Mojica and Ricardo Ariel Toribio	Drama	Set in Las Terrenas	
2014	La ventana de Doña Nena	Nino Martínez				
2014	El seno de la esperanza	Freddy Vargas	Cheddy García	Drama	Short; about a Dominican mother who cared for Haitian babies following the 2010 earthquake	
2014	De María África a María Montez, Un mito en Technicolor	Jesús Reyes		Documentary	About Dominican actress Maria Montez	
2014	Vamos de robo	Roberto Ángel Salcedo	Manolo Ozuna, Fausto Mata, Anthony Ríos, Carlos Sánchez and Cheddy García	Comedy		
2014	Duarte, traición y gloria	Leo Silverio	Josué Guerrero and Miguel Ángel Martínez	Historical drama	About Juan Pablo Duarte	
2014	Locas y atrapadas	Alfonso Rodríguez	Melymel, Denise Quiñones, Silvana Arias, Sabrina Gómez and Dulcita Lieggi	Drama		
2014	De pez en cuando	Francisco Valdez	Luis José German	Comedy		
2014	Lotoman 003	Archie López	Raymond Pozo and Miguel Céspedes	Comedy		
2014	Al sur de la inocencia	Héctor Manuel Valdez	Cristian Álvarez, Sarah Jorge León and Frank Perozo	Drama		
2014	La extraña	César Rodríguez	Frank Perozo and Evelyna Rodríguez	Drama	Remake of L'ètrangère (Sergio Gobi, 1968)	
2014	Carmita	Laura Amelia Guzmán and Israel Cárdenas	Carmita Ignarra	Documentary	About actress Carmita Ignarra	
2014	El pelotudo	Raymond Hernandéz Jr.	Michel Gurfi, Dalisa Alegría and José Guillermo Cortines	Comedy		
2014	Despertar	José María Cabral	Adrián Mas, Julietta Rodríguez and Frank Perozo	Psychological thriller		
2014	Quiero ser fiel	Joe Menendez	Valentino Lanús and Sandra Echeverría	Comedy		
2014	El que mucho abarca	Ronni Castillo	Luz García, Georgina Duluc and Carlos Sánchez	Comedy		
2014	Un lío en dólares	Francis Disla	Fausto Mata, Jalsen Santana and Julio Gassette	Comedy		
2014	Código paz	Pedro Urrutia	Héctor Aníbal	Action		
2014	Primero de enero	Erika Bagnarello	Victor Pintor, Paula Sánchez-Ferry and Carlos Báez	Drama		
2014	Bajo las carpas	Johanne Gómez Terrero		Documentary	About Haitian children in the aftermath of the 2010 earthquake	
2014	Yo soy la salsa	Manuel Villalona	Danilo Reynoso	Historical/musical		
2014	No hay más remedio	José Enrique Pintor	Iván García Guerra, Salvador Pérez Martínez and Ángel Haché	Drama		
2014	339 Amín Abel Hasbún. Memoria de un crimen.	Etzel Báez	Pericles Mejía	Drama	About student leader Amin Abel Hasbun	
2014	María Montez	Vicente Peñaroccha		Biographical drama	About Dominican actress Maria Montez	
2015	El rey de La Habana	Agustí Villaronga	Maykol David Tortoló Cepeda, Yordanka Ariosa and Héctor Medina	Drama	Spanish-Dominican co-production	
2015	Los Paracaidistas	Archie López	Fausto Mata, Irving Alberti, Cheddy García and Daniel Sarcos	Comedy		
2015	Detective Willy	José María Cabral	Fausto Mata and Denise Quiñones	Adventure comedy		
2015	Pa'l Campamento	Roberto Ángel Salcedo	Manolo Ozuna, Kenny Grullón and Roberto Ángel Saledo	Comedy		
2015	Una breve historia de amor	Alan Nadal Piantini		Romantic comedy		
2015	Bestia de Cardo	Virginia Sánchez Navarro	Virginia Sánchez Navarro, Angélica Aragón and Jorge Luis Moreno	Drama		
2015	Morir soñando	Josh Crook	Hony Estrella, Ximena Duque, Pedro Moreno, Hemky Madera and Marcos Bonetti	Drama		
2015	La gunguna	Ernesto Alemany	Patricia Ascuasiati, Nashla Bogaert and Francisco Cruz	Drama		
2015	Blanco	Melvin Durán		Documentary	About a rural albino community	
2015	Tú y yo	Natalia Cabral and Oriol Estrada		Documentary	About the dynamic between a maid and her employer	
2015	Pueto' pa' mí	Iván Herrera	Mozart La Para and El Mayor Clásico	Drama		
2015	Algún lugar	Guillermo Zouain	Arnold Martínez, Javier Grullón and Víctor Alfonso	Drama		
2015	Todo incluido	Roberto Ángel Salcedo	Robert Ángel Salcedo, Fausto Mata and Cuquín Victoria	Comedy		
2015	Ladrones	Joe Menendez	Fernando Colunga, Eduardo Yáñez and Miguel Varoni	Comedy		
2015	Oro y polvo	Félix Limardo	Alfonso Amaya, Octavio Pisano and Carolina Guerra	Drama	About drug trafficking	
2015	República de color	Héctor Valdez		Documentary	About the Dominican plastic industry	
2015	Dinero fácil	Daniel Aurelio	Daniel Aurelio, Mario Núñez and Margaux Da Silva	Drama/thriller		
2015	Tuberculo gourmet	Archie López	Raymond Pozo and Miguel Céspedes	Comedy		
2015	Del color de la noche	Agliberto Meléndez	José Francisco Gerardino	Historical drama	About the life of José Francisco Peña Gómez	
2015	Los fabuloses ma' mejores	Carlos Plascencia	Luis José López, Denise Quiñones and Cuquín Victoria	Children's/comedy		
2016	Todos los hombres son iguales	Manuel Gómez Pereira	Frank Perozo, Christian Meier, Mike Amigorena and Nashla Bogaert	Comedy	Remake of the 1994 Spanish film Todos los hombres sois iguales	
2016	Ovni	Raúl Marchand Sánchez	Tony Pascual and Christian Álvarez	Science fiction/comedy		
2016	Jeffrey	Yanillys Peréz	Joselito "Jeffrey" de la Cruz	Documentary	About a young man working to become a reggaeton singer	
2016	Flor de azúcar	Fernando Báez Mella	Héctor Aníbal	Adventure/drama		
2016	Sitio de sitios	Natalia Cabral and Oriol Estrada		Documentary	About the Dominican tourism economy	
2016	A orillas del mar	Bladimir Abud	Richard Douglas, Antonio Melencino and Miguel Ángel Martínez	Drama		
2016	La familia Reyna	Tito Rodríguez	David Maler, Danilo Reynoso, Cuquín Victoria and Adalgisa Pantaleón	Drama		
2016	El camino correcto	José Carlos Goma		Drama		
2016	Cuentas por cobrar	Ronni Castillo	Manolo Ozuna, Irvin Alberti and Phillip Rodriguez	Drama		
2016	Verdad o reto	Suzette Reyes	Christian Álvarez, Manny Pérez and Aquiles Correa	Romantic drama		
2016	Mi suegra y yo	Roberto Ángel Salcedo	Cheddy García and Manolo Ozuna	Comedy		
2016	¿Pa' Qué Me Casé?	Roberto Ángel Salcedo	Fausto Mata and Cheddy García	Comedy		
2016	Dos policísa en apuros	Francis Disla	Fausto Mata, Manolo Ozuna and Jalsen Santana	Action/comedy		
2016	Catastrópico	Jorge Hazoury	Brie Gabrielle, Johnny Sky and William Liriano	Action/comedy		
2016	Loki 7	Ernesto Alemany	Isaac Saviñon, José Guillermo Cortines, David Chocarro, Shalim Ortiz, Carlos de la Mota, Héctor Aníbal and Marco de Paula	Comedy		
2016	Tubérculo presidente	Archie López	Raymond Pozo and Miguel Céspedes	Comedy		
2016	Nana	Tatiana Fernandez Geara		Documentary		
2016	Allen Report	Alanna Lockward		Documentary	About the African Methodist Episcopal Church in the Dominican Republic, Haiti and Namibia	
2016	Camino a Higüey	Abi Alberto		Documentary	About the Our Lady of Altagracia pilgrimage	
2016	Caribbean Fantasy	Johanné Gómez Terrero		Documentary		
2016	Muerte por mil cortes	Juan Mejía Botero and Jake Kheel		Documentary	About deforestation at the Haitian border	
2016	Si Dios quiere, Yuli	Jean Jean		Documentary	About Jean's mother, a Haitian woman who had been living in the Dominican Republican for more than 30 years	
2016	Girasol	Dilia Pachecho Méndez	Laureano Álvarez, Pachy Méndez and Vladimir Acevedo	Biographical drama	About the life of Víctor Méndez Capellán, founder of Grupo Vimenca	
2017	Carpinteros	José María Cabral	Jean Jean, Judith Rodriguez Perez and Ramón Emilio Candelario	Drama	About Dominican prisons	
2017	Colao	Frank Perozo	Raymond Pozo, Miguel Céspedes, Manny Pérez and Nashla Bogaert	Romantic comedy		
2017	Cocote	Nelson Carlo de Los Santos Arias	Vicente Santos, Judith Rodíguez, Pepe Sierra, Yuberbi Rosa and Isabel Spencer	Drama		
2017	El peor comediante del mundo	Luis Corporán	Phillip Rodríguez, Miguel Alcántara and Alina Vargas	Comedy/drama		
2017	Todas las mujeres son iguales	David Maler	Nashla Bogaert, Cheddy García, Iris Peynado and Lía Briones	Comedy		
2017	Dos compadres y una yola	Félix Peña	Tony Pascual and Félix Peña	Comedy	Dominican-Puerto Rican film	
2017	¡Y... a Dios que me perdone!	Ángel Muñiz	Johnnie Mercedes	Drama	About institutional corruption	
2017	El hombre que cuida	Alejandro Andújar	Héctor Aníbal	Drama		
2017	Voces de la calle	Hans García	Vladimir Acevedo, El Alfa and Kenny De Jesús Brea	Drama		
2017	Reinbou	Andrés Curbelo and David Maler	Nashla Bogaert and Erick Vásquez	Drama		
2017	El encuentro	Alfonso Rodríguez	Alejandra Alemany, Massiel Taveras and Joshua Wagner	Supernatural drama		
2017	Sambá	Laura Amelia Guzmán and Israel Cárdenas	Algenis Perez Soto and Etorre D'Alessandro	Drama		
2017	Luis	Archie López	Alfonso Rodríguez and Axel Mansilla	Drama		
2017	Las siete muertes	Gerardo Herrero	Manuela Vellés, Víctor Clavijo and Juan Manuel Bernal	Thriller	Spanish-Mexican-Dominican coproduction	
2017	Reinicio	Oscar Gutiérrez	Nicolás Concepción, Jesús Villanueva and Osvaldo Mota	Drama		
2017	Misión estrella	Fernando Báez Mella	Javier Grullón, Akari Endo and Anthony Álvarez	Drama		
2017	Azul magia	Yoel Morales	Esmailyn Morel, Mario Núñez and Marselle Jiménez	Fantasy/adventure		
2017	Patricia: el regreso del sueño	René Fortunato	Amauris Pérez and Stephany Liriano	Comedy		
2017	Mañana no te olvides	José Enrique Pintor	Freddy Ginebra and Guillermo Finke	Drama/comedy		
2017	Hay un país en el mundo	José Enrique Pintor		Documentary	About Dominican culture and the arts	
2017	Cuentos de camino	Javier Vargas	Roque Vargas, Edgar Díaz, Lissa Marie Brito and Matthew Ortega	Horror		
2017	Super Papá	Roberto Ángel Salcedo	Roberto Ángel Salcedo	Comedy		
2017	El plan perfecto	Roberto Ángel Salcedo	Roberto Ángel Salcedo, Daniel Sarcos, Jochy Santos, Fausto Mata, Manolo Ozuna and Bolívar Valera	Comedy		
2017	Pasao de libras	Roberto Ángel Salcedo	Luis José Germán, Carlos de la Mota and Carlos Sánchez	Comedy		
2017	Melocotones	Héctor Valdez	Peter Vives, Joaquín Ferreira and María Guinea	Science fiction	Remake of The Infinite Man	
2018	Trabajo sucio	David Pagan Mariñez	Cheddy García, Nashla Bogaert, Frank Perozo, Kenny Grullón and Jonathan Abreu	Comedy		
2018	Reunión	Arturo Betancourt	Fernando Betancourt and Daniel Evangelista	Drama		
2018	Veneno: Primera caída – El relámpago de Jack	Tabaré Blanchard	Manny Pérez and Pepe Sierra	Drama/biopic	About Jack Veneno	
2018	El fantasma de mi novia	Francis Disla	Carmen Villalobos and William Levy	Fantasy/romantic comedy		
2018	Todos somos marineros	Miguel Angel Moulet	Andrei Sladkov, Ravil Sadreev, Julia Thays and Alejandro Vargas Viela	Drama	Peruvian-Dominican co-production	
2018	La tragedia de Rio Verde	Miguel Vásquez	Johnnie Mercedes, Franklin Domínguez, Dulcita Lieggi and Ernesto Báez	Biographical drama	Based on the 1948 plane crash that killed the members of the Santiago baseball team	
2018	Amigo D	Francisco Valdez	Francisco Valdez, Bruno Lastra and Hony Estrella	Drama		
2018	El clóset	Miguel Vásquez	Anthony Álvarez	Drama		
2018	Pulso	Giancarlo Beras-Goico	Ana Carmen León and Alfonso Rodríguez	Drama		
2018	En altamar	Alfonso Rodríguez	Christian Álvarez and Jessica Vargas	Drama/thriller		
2018	Hermanos	Archie López	Raymond Pozo and Miguel Céspedes	Drama		
2018	Jana	Federico Segarra	Melissa Pagan, Romeo Acosta and Jafreisi Adames	Drama		
2018	Botija	Fernando Fabian	Miguel Ángel Martínez, Any Ferreiras, Edy Ávila and Enmanuel de León	Drama/thriller		
2018	Lo que siento por ti	Raúl Camilo	Yordanka Ariosa, Robinson Díaz, Gabriela de la Garza, Frank Perozo and Nashla Bogaert	Drama		
2018	Juanita	Leticia Tonos	Cheddy García	Drama		
2018	Noelí en los países	Laura Amelia Guzmán and Israel Cárdenas	Yanet Mojica	Documentary/drama		
2018	Pobres millionairios	Roberto Ángel Salcedo	Roberto Ángel Salcedo, Manolo Ozuna, Dalisa Alegría and María Castillo	Comedy		
2018	Jugando a bailar	Roberto Ángel Salcedo	Manolo Ozuna and Fausto Mata	Comedy		
2018	Un 4to. de Josué	Gabriel Valencia	Iván Aybar and Dulcita Lieggi	Comedy		
2018	Cómplices	Luis Eduardo Reyes	Arath De La Torre	Romantic comedy		
2018	Qué León	Frank Perozo	Clarissa Molina, Raymond Pozo and Miguel Céspedes	Romantic comedy		
2019	La Fiera y la fiesta	Laura Amelia Guzmán and Israel Cárdenas	Geraldine Chaplin and Udo Kier	Drama		
2019	El proyeccionista	José María Cabral	Félix Germán	Drama		
2019	La musiquita por dentro	Ernesto Alemany		Comedy		
2019	Sol y luna: Dos mejor que una	José Enrique Pintor	Frank Perozo and Nerea Barros	Romantic drama		
2019	Cinderelo	Beto Gómez	William Levy, Luis José Germán and Stephanie Liriano	Comedy		
2019	Kanibarú	Alfonso Rodríguez and Giancarlo Beras Goico	Carolina Féliz, Natalia Fermín and Mark B	Drama		
2019	Casi fiel	Roberto Ángel Salcedo	Juan Carlo Pichardo and Dalisa Alegría	Comedy		
2019	El Equipito, Capítulo 1: ¡Todo por una Herencia!	Roberto Ángel Salcedo	La Insuperable, Manolo Ozuna, Melymel, Alex Matos and Albert Mena	Comedy		
2019	La barbería	Waddys Jáquez	Héctor Aníbal, Rossmery Almonte and Georgina Duluc	Comedy		
2019	Atrako por joder	Eddy Jiménez	Bulín 47, Nico Clínico and Chiki El de la Vaina	Comedy		
2019	La maravilla	David Pagán	Fausto Mata, Cheddy García, Pio La Ditingancia and Frank Perozo	Comedy		
2019	Guzbay New York	Víctor Reyes	Aquiles Correa and Brashall Santos	Comedy		
2019	Súper bomberos	Francis Disla	César Évora, Eduardo Yáñez and Eugenio Siller	Comedy		
2019	Los Leones	Frank Perozo	Raymond Pozo, Miguel Césspedes, Ozuna and Clarissa Molina	Comedy		
2019	Colores	Luis Cepeda	Stephanie Liriano	Drama		
2019	Cara a cara	Manny Paulino	Anne García and Giancarlos de Sousa	Action/drama		
2019	Encargo	Juan Ramón Martínez	Johnnie Mercedes and Juan Fernandez	Drama		
2019	En tu piel	Matías Bize	Eva Arias and Josué Guerrero	Romance/drama		
2019	Miriam miente	Natalia Cabral and Oriol Estrada		Documentary		
2019	La isla rota	Félix Germán	Algenis Perez Soto, Manny Pérez, Dalisa Alegría, Frank Perozo and Félix Germán	Historical drama	About the 1937 Parsley massacre	
2019	Héroes de Junio: La Historia Prohibida	Roddy Pérez	Vlad Sosa, Roddy Pérez and Cheddy García	Historical drama	About a 1959 coup against Rafael Trujillo	
2019	Expresos	Jesús Villanueva	Johan Paulino, Yina Massiele Fermín and Nizara Morine	Drama		
2019	Buscando al zorro	Wigner Duarte	Kendri V. Martínez, Guillermo Liriano Bass and Mariluz Acosta	Drama		
2019	Una fiesta inolvidable	Tito Rodríguez	Christian Álvarez, Victor Morey, Ivan Aybar, Yasser Michelén, Anyelina Sánchez, Margaux Da Silva and Luz Quezada	Horror		
2019	Isla de plástico	José María Cabral		Documentary	About plastic waste management in the Dominican Republic	
2019	Cacú: un cambio por la vida	Marvin del Cid		Documentary	About environmental/nature conservation	
2019	Gilbert: Héroe de dos pueblos	Euri Cabral and Zinayda Rodríguez		Documentary	About Gregorio Urbano Gilbert	
2019	1984 el otro abril	Reyvin Jáquez		Documentary	About the days leading up to the mass protests against Salvador Jorge Blanco in 1984	

== 2020s ==
Year	Title	Director	Cast	Genre	Notes	Refs
2020	Papi	Noelia Quintero	Avril Alcántara and Hony Estrella	Drama		
2020	Mis 500 Locos	Leticia Tonos	Luis José Germán and Jane Santos	Drama	About a psychiatric doctor during Rafael Trujillo's dictatorship	
2021	Bantú Mama	Ivan Herrera	Clarisse Albrecht, Scarlet Reyes, Euris Javiel and Arturo Perez	Drama	Premiered at SXSW	
2021	No es lo que parece	David Maler	Nashla Bogaert and Frank Perozo	Romantic comedy		
2021	Candela	Andrés Farías	Félix Germán, Sarah Jorge León and Gerard Mercedes	Drama/thriller		
2021	Liborio	Nino Martínez Sosa	Vicente Santos, Emilio Caneldario and Karina Valdez	Drama		
2021	La Rasante	Hans García	Richard Douglas, Brian D'Elena, Madeline Abreu and Mario Núñez	Drama		
2021	Hotel Coppelia	José María Cabral	Nashla Bogaert, Lumy Lizardo, Cyndie Lundi, Jazz Vilá and Nick Searcy	Historical drama	About the women who lived and worked at a hotel bar during the Dominican Civil War of 1965	
2022	Jupia	José Gómez de Vargas and Julietta Rodríguez	David Maler and Julietta Rodríguez	Dark fantasy/horror		
2022	Shotgun Wedding	Jason Moore	Jennifer Lopez and Josh Duhamel	Romantic comedy/action	Filmed in Río San Juan	
2022	El App	Taba Blanchard	Issac Saviñón, José Guillermo Cortines, Lydia Li and Alina Rancier	Thriller		
2022	Parsley	José María Cabral	Cyndie Lundy, Ramón Emilio Candelario, Pavel Marcano and Isabel Spencer	Historical drama	About the 1937 Parsley massacre	
2023	Colao 2	Frank Perozo	Raymond Pozo, Miguel Céspede, Nashla Bogaert and Manny Pérez	Comedy		
2023	Cuarencena	David Maler	Frank Perozo, Nashla Bogaert, Luis José Germán, Elizabeth Chahín, Richarson Díaz, Freddy Ginebra, Soraya Pina, Isabel Spencer and Joshua Wagner	Comedy/drama		
2023	La estrategia del mero	Edgar Alberto De Luque Jácome	Roamir Pineda and Nathalia Rincón	Drama	Nominated in the First Feature Competition for Best Film Award at the Tallinn Black Nights Film Festival	
2023	La ternura	Vicente Villanueva	Emma Suárez, Alexandra Jiménez, Anna Moliner, Gonzalo de Castro, Fernando Guallar and Carlos Cuevas	Fantasy/comedy	Spanish-Dominican film	
2023	El método	David Maler	Nashla Bogaert, Héctor Aníbal, Georgina Duluc, Pepe Sierra, Yasser Michelén, Roger Wasserman and Dahiana Castro	Comedy/drama/thriller	Winner of Best Film, Best Director and Best Leading Actor (Pepe Sierra) at the 3rd Fine Arts Film Festival. Made in the Dominican Republic.	
2023	El año del tigre	Yasser Michelén	Carlos Alcántara, Wendy Ramos, Gonzalo Torres, Jossi Martínez and Nashla Bogaert	Comedy	Produced by the Dominican Bou Group	
2024	Aire: Just Breathe	Leticia Tonos	Sophie Gaëlle, Paz Vega and Jalsen Santana	Science fiction/drama	Post-apocalyptic film	
2024	Amanece en Samaná	Rafa Cortés	Luis Tosar, Luisa Mayol, Luis Zahera and Bárbara Santa-Cruz	Comedy		
2024	Canta y no llores	Félix Sabroso	Consuelo Duval, Michelle Rodríguez and Patricia Maqueo	Comedy	Mexican-Dominican-Spanish production shot in the Dominican Republic	
2024	Olivia & Las Nubes	Tomás Pichardo Espaillat	Olga Valdez, Elsa Nuñez and Héctor Aníbal	Drama		
2024	La bachata de Biónico	Yoel Morales	Manuel Raposo, Ana Minier and El Napo	Mockumentary	Winner of the Global Audience Award at the 2024 South by Southwest Film & TV Festival, the Audience Award at the 13th Costa Rica International Film Festival and the Best Actor Award (Manuel Raposo) at the 45th Havana Film Festival	
2024	Capitán Avispa	Jean Gabriel Guerra and Jonnathan Melendez	Luis Fonsi	Action/adventure	Nominated for Best Animated Film at the 12th Platino Awards	
2024	Pepe	Nelson Carlo De Los Santos Arias	Jhon Narváez, Sor María Ríos, Fareed Matjila, Harmony Ahalwa and Jorge Puntillón García	Drama	Premiered at 74th Berlin International Film Festival	
2024	Pérez Rodríguez	Humberto Tavárez	Cuquín Victoria, Xiomara Rodríguez, Lisbeth Santos, Luis José German, Stephany Liriano, Joshua Wagner, Rolando Herrand, and Ángela Gómez	Comedy/drama	Nominated for Best First Fiction Feature at the Santo Domingo Global Film Festival	
2024	El silencio de Marcos Tremmer	Miguel García de la Calera	Benjamín Vicuña and Adriana Ugarte	Romantic drama	Spanish-Dominican-Uruguain-Chilean co-production; nominated in the Latin-American Competition for Best Film at the 39th Mar del Plata International Film Festival	
2024	Sugar Island	Johanné Gómez Terrero	Yelidá Díaz, Juan Maria Almonte and Diogenes Medina	Drama	Coming-of-age film; winner of the Edipo Re Award - Special Mention at the 81st Venice International Film Festival, the Ca' Foscari Young Jury Award at the 81st Venice International Film Festival and the WIFT GR Award at the 65th Thessaloniki International Film Festival	
2024	El Tiburón	Félix Germán	Mozart La Para, Dalisa Alegría, Bárbaro Marín, Tahimi Alvariño, Dominique Telemaque and Cyndie Lundy	Survival/comedy		
2024	Cazatesoros	Héctor Valdez	Carlos Alcántara, Franco Cabrera, Nashla Bogaert, Sergio Galliani and Patricia Barreto	Action/adventure/comedy		
2024	Bienvenidos al paraíso	Ani Alva Helfer	Tatiana Calmell, Andrés Salas, Franco Cabrera, Patricia Barreto, Katia Condos and Bruno Odar	Romantic comedy		
2024	Zafari	Mariana Rondón	Daniela Ramírez, Francisco Denis and Samantha Castillo	Comedy/drama	Filmed in Peru, Mexico and the Dominican Republic	
2025	Carlota la más barrial	Yoel Morales	Carasaf Sánchez, Fausto Mata and La Materialista	Action/comedy		
2025	Platanero	Juan Frank Hernández	Irdens Exantus and Stanley Exantus	Horror		
2025	Reversión	Jacob Santana	Jaime Lorente, Manu Vega, Belén Rueda and Fernando Cayo	Psychological thriller		
2025	Sanky Panky 4: de Safari	Elías Acosta	Fausto Mata, Aquiles Correa, Tony Pascual, Massimo Borghetti and Franklin Romero Jr.	Comedy		
