= Cheddy García =

Dominican comedian, actress, writer, and teacher (born 1970)

- Born: Mercedes José García; 19 February 1970 (age 56); Santo Domingo, Dominican Republic
- Education: Universidad Autónoma de Santo Domingo
- Occupations: Comedian, actress, writer, teacher
- Awards: Soberano Award (2012); La Silla Award (2013)

Mercedes José García (born 19 February 1970), known as Cheddy García, is a Dominican comedian, actress, writer, and teacher. She has starred in several films, including the title role of La lucha de Ana (2012) – which earned her multiple Best Actress awards – and Los Súper (2013).

An exponent of Afro-Caribbean poetry, in 2004 she published a book of décimas, La Negrita Carida, with a foreword by writer Mariano Lebrón Saviñón and comedian Freddy Beras-Goico.

== Early years ==
Cheddy García was born in Santo Domingo on 19 February 1970. From a poor neighborhood, she was educated in a convent from an early age. She studied pedagogy, initially on a scholarship to the Universidad Nacional Pedro Henríquez Ureña (UNPHU), but she suffered an emotional crisis due to the breakup of her marriage, which caused her grades to slip. She transferred to the Universidad Autónoma de Santo Domingo (UASD), keeping many of her existing credits. There, she joined the university's cultural movement and began appearing in theatrical productions.

García worked in primary education for several years, teaching first to eighth grades at the Aurora Tavárez Belliard school. She stood out for having a rigorous supervision and correction process, and for attending to the individual needs of her students according to the principles of Jean Piaget. She also taught at the Las Américas Educational Center and the Colegio Internacional SEK.

== Entertainment career ==
Encouraged by her colleagues, García took part in a talent show on the program Punto Final, which she won, impressing producer Freddy Beras-Goico. After this, she appeared on several programs on UHF stations. She found some success on Caribe Show, hosted by Raymond Pozo and Miguel Céspedes, but this was interrupted when they left the channel for Telemicro.

After Céspedes recommended her to producers, she began to appear on the program Quédate Ahí, where she made a favorable impression on viewers with characters such as "La Evangélica", "Manolito", and "Alondra". On La opción de las 12, she introduced her recurrent character "La Desesperada del Amargue", which became extremely popular. Known as "La Mamá del Humor", she performed many shows throughout the country, and was featured in many advertisements.

She regularly appeared on the Televisión Dominicana program Más Roberto in the United States hosted by Roberto Salcedo Jr. until 2017. She co-hosted Bien de Bien with Luis Manuel Aguiló and Liondy Ozoria from 2014 to 2019.

=== La lucha de Ana ===
In 2012, García surprised critics and audiences with her performance in the title role of the feature film drama La lucha de Ana. In it, she plays a humble single mother who seeks justice for the death of her son. Critic José D'Laura wrote, "The pleasant surprise is greater because Cheddy García has made a career in the world of television humor, and her formidable Ana is a totally different acting register than what we are accustomed to."

This role earned her Best Actress honors at the 2012 Soberano Awards, the first La Silla Awards presentation, and the Providence Latin American Film Festival in Rhode Island.

She went on to co-host the Soberano Awards with Irving Alberti in 2016.

== Works ==
=== Books ===
- La Negrita Carida (2004), décimas

=== Films ===
| Year | Title | Character | Director |
|---|---|---|---|
| 2012 | La lucha de Ana | Ana | Bladimir Abud |
| 2012 | Lotoman 2.0 | Helga / Mercedes José García | Archie López |
| 2013 | El Seno de la Esperanza | Sonia Marmolejos | Freddy Vargas |
| 2013 | Los Súper | Cristina | Bladimir Abud |
| 2013 | Mi angelito favorito | Chelina | Alfonso Rodríguez |
| 2013 | Noche de Circo | Social worker | Alfonso Rodriguez |
| 2014 | Vamos de Robo | Altagracia | Roberto Salcedo Jr. |
| 2015 | Bestia de Cardo | Melody | Virginia Sánchez |
| 2015 | Los Paracaidistas | Bélgica | Archie López |
| 2015 | Algún lugar | Marta | Guillermo Zouain |
| 2015 | Tubérculo Gourmet | Ángela | Archie López |
| 2016 | Mi suegra y yo | Adamaris | Roberto Salcedo Jr. |
| 2016 | A orillas del mar | Ramona | Bladimir Abud |
| 2016 | ¿Pa' qué me casé? | Mercedes | Roberto Salcedo Jr. |
| 2016 | Tubérculo Presidente | Ángela | Archie López |
| 2018 | Trabajo sucio | Josefina | José Ramón Alama |
| 2018 | Juanita | Juanita | Leticia Tonos |

=== Plays ===
- El gran carnaval by Haffe Serulle
- La parada de guagua, directed by Germana Quintana (2007)
- Locamente embarazada, directed by Germana Quintana (2013)
- Malas (2013)

== Awards ==
- 2012: Soberano Award for Best Actress for La lucha de Ana
- 2012: Best Actress Award from the Providence Latin American Film Festival for La lucha de Ana
- 2013: La Silla Award for Best Actress for La lucha de Ana
