= Iván Gómez =

Iván Gómez may refer to:

- Iván Gómez (footballer, born 1980), Spanish football goalkeeper
- Iván Gómez (footballer, born 1997), Argentine football defender
- Iván Gómez (mountaineer) (born 1975), Dominican mountaineer
