= Irvin Alberti =

Dominican actor and humourist

- Born: 10 July 1967 (age 59); Santo Domingo, Dominican Republic
- Television: ¡Qué Chévere es Saber!
- Spouse: Yelitza Haimara Peña Sanlley (m. 2000) Ysabel Aracena 2017- present
- Children: 3
- Relatives: Nuryn Sanlley (mother-in-law)
- Biography for Irvin Alberti at IMDb

Irving Alberti is a Dominican actor and humourist. In 2012, he was elected by Luz García's Noche de Luz programme as a "Summer's Hot Body".

== Career ==
Radio

- Botando el Golpe
- Parando el Trote
- El Mismo Golpe Con Jochy

Television

- Perdone la hora
- No hay 2 sin 3 (TV series, 2005; aired in 2009)
- Chévere Nights (2011–present)
- Qué chévere es saber

Theatre

- Hairspray
- Me dejó por Nueva York
- Las aventuras de Willie
- ¡Qué buena es mi suegra!
- Blancanieves
- Los tres temores

Filmography

Year	Title	Character	Director	Country
2004	Negocios son negocios	Monchi Ventura	Jorge de Bernardi	(Dominican Republic)
2008	Santi Clo... La vaina de la Navidad	Antonio	José Enrique Pintor	(Dominican Republic)
2009	3 al rescate	Alfredo/Don Nicanor	Jorge Morillo & Luis Morillo	(Dominican Republic)
2012	Feo de Día, Lindo de Noche	Carlitos	Alfonso Rodríguez	(Dominican Republic)
2013	Profe por Accidente	Adolfo	Roberto Ángel Salcedo	(Dominican Republic)
2013	Arrobá	Samuel	José María Cabral	(Dominican Republic)
2014	De pez en cuando	Juan	Francisco Adolfo Valdez	(Dominican Republic)
2014	El Pelotudo	Oscar	Raymond Hernández Jr.	(Dominican Republic)
2015	Los Paracaidistas	Ángel	Archie López	(Dominican Republic)
2016	Cuentas Por Cobrar	Emilio	Ronni Castillo	(Dominican Republic)
2017	Luis	Pereya	Archie López	(Dominican Republic)
2018	Qué León	Coronel Liriano	Frank Perozo	(Dominican Republic)
2018	El Fantasma de mi Novia	Doctor Pérez	Francis "Indio" Disla Ferreira	(Dominican Republic)
2019	Los Leones	Coronel Liriano	Frank Perozo	(Dominican Republic)
