= Trópico (TV series) =

- DVD Cover
- Genre: Telenovela; Romance; Drama
- Created by: Pablo Vásquez
- Directed by: Luis Barrios; Miluska Rosas; Jorge Tapia
- Starring: Scarlet Ortiz; Víctor González; José Guillermo Cortines; José Luis Rodríguez; Ivonne Veras-Goico
- Opening theme: "Juanita Bonita" by José Luis Rodríguez "El Puma"
- Countries of origin: Venezuela; Dominican Republic
- Original language: Spanish
- No. of episodes: 100

Production
- Executive producers: Jorge Felix; Margarita Morales Macedo
- Production location: Santo Domingo
- Running time: 45 mins
- Production companies: Venevisión International; Iguana Productions; Antena Latina

Original release
- Network: Venevisión Plus; Antena 7
- Release: June 4 – September 14, 2007

Tropico is a telenovela produced and filmed entirely in the Dominican Republic by Venevisión International, Iguana Productions and Antena Latina. It is a remake of the 1997 Peruvian telenovela Escándalo.

Most of the cast and crew are Dominicans, except Jose Luis Rodriguez and Scarlet Ortiz who are Venezuelans, Javier Delgiudice, Vanessa Jerí, Giovanna Valcárcel, William Bell-Taylor, and Amparo Brambilla who are from Peru; and Victor González and Juan Carlos Gonzales who are Mexican actors.

== Plot ==
Set in the beautiful beaches of Santo Domingo, the capital of the Dominican Republic, this melodrama revolves around the young, provincial Angelica Santos (Scarlet Ortiz) who works in the local tobacco hacienda "La Guzmana". Angelica leaves her home to get away from her unscrupulous aunt, and goes to Santo Domingo. Then she joins a beauty pageant sponsored by Guillermo Guzman and there she meets and falls in love with Antonio Guzman. Their love is quickly torn apart by Antonio's brother and Angelica's aunt, who conspire against them.

Angelica Santos is a really hard-working girl who had a really hard life. She works in a tobacco place and makes them and reads stories to her friends (co-workers) to encourage them. She is loved by everyone. She has a really mean aunt, who has a bar, and at night makes her work at the bar to serve beer for the people. The clients there are perverts and one night a man who tries to rape her. She escapes before he could do anything to her. She goes to the capital and meets a journalist who wants her to participate in the Queen of Caribbean contest, she accepts. Days later, she meets the love of her life Antonio Guzman a rich man whose father organized the contest and when they met he was helping carrying journals. He has a girlfriend. She thought he worked by carrying journals, but later finds out the truth and forgives him. They fall in love, Antonio breaks up with his girlfriend. Angelica wins Queen of Caribbean. After she won, her aunt blackmails her by telling her that she'll tell Antonio about her past and lie to him by telling him that she was a prostitute if she doesn't give her money. Angelica doesn't want to fall for it, so she makes a CD where she tells Antonio about her past. Everything gets erased on the CD while he was working on his computer and doesn't see it. He didn't care and told her that he doesn't care about anything on the CD which made Angelica so happy. On the day of their wedding, Angelica's aunt, Antonio's brother and the man who tried to rape her come and sabotaged the wedding, told Antonio about her past and lie by saying that she's a prostitute. Antonio doesn't believe Angelica and they break up. She is no longer queen and goes somewhere else and open a restaurant. She takes revenge on the man who tried to rape her and he goes to prison. Days after she goes back to the capital, Antonio is back with his ex-girlfriend. One day, he asks someone to fix the CD and he sees what was on it. He and Angelica become friends. He breaks up with his girlfriends. Angelica participates in the competition and win Queen of Caribbean. That night they get back together. Antonio and Agelica get married and in the end, she goes to her village with Antonio and tell them their story.

== Cast ==
- Scarlet Ortiz as Angélica Santos
- Victor González as Antonio Guzmán
- José Luis Rodríguez as Guillermo Guzmán
- Robinson Manuel as Juan Carlos Villanueva
- Javier Delgiudice as Ramiro Mendoza
- Mildred Quiroz as Raquel Sánchez
- José Guillermo Cortines as Juan Pablo Guzmán
- José Manuel Rodriguez as Mario Montalvo
- Nuryn Sanlley as Roberta Santos
- William Bell-Taylor as Eduardo Lucar
- César Olmos as Canales Díaz
- Sergio Carlo as Eddy Jiménez
- Ivonne Beras Goico as Victoria Guzmán
- Mía Taveras as Patricia Echeverría
- Laura García-Godoy as Mirna Zuyón
- Dominic Benelli as Diana Masías
- Fausto Rojas as Poichon Gamarra
- Mabel Martínez as Anita Suárez
- Georgina Duluc as Elian Valenzuela
- Sonia Alfonso as Elsa
- Mariela González as Pepi Echeverría
- Ramia Estévez as Magaly
- Edgar Hernández as Ricardo Masías
- Ivan García as Hector Masías
- Fifi Almonte as Laura Cabrera
- Vanessa Jerí as Lolita Montalvo
- Amparo Brambilla as Sirvienta de Mario
- Juan María Almonte as Mufareche Montes
- Estela Chávez as Marina
- Gloria Hernández as Noni
- Elisa Abreu as Rebeca
- Juan Carlos Gonzales as Sebastian Patson
- Hensey Pichardo as Raul Romero
- Agustín Benitez as Rafael Rodríguez
- Alfonso Rodríguez as Michael Alcántara
- Juan Carlos Salazar as Armando

== Filming locations ==
- San José de las Matas
- Santo Domingo
- Cabarete
- Samaná Province
- Malecon Center
