= Trabajo sucio =

- Theatrical release poster
- Directed by: David Pagan Mariñez
- Written by: Jose Ramon Alama
- Produced by: Jose Ramon Alama
- Starring: Cheddy García; Nashla Bogaert; Frank Perozo; Kenny Grullón; Jonathan Abreu; Carol Acosta; El Mayor Clásico; Yasser Michelen; Ovandy Camilo; Ana María Arias; Vicente Santos
- Cinematography: Juan Carlos Gómez
- Edited by: Jose Delio Ares
- Music by: Sergio Jiménez Lacima
- Production company: Bou Group
- Distributed by: Caribbean Films Distribution
- Release dates: August 30, 2018 (Dominican Republic); September 20, 2018 (Puerto Rico); October 26, 2018 (United States)
- Running time: 87 minutes
- Country: Dominican Republic
- Language: Spanish

Trabajo sucio (lit. 'Dirty work') is a 2018 Dominican comedy film directed by David Pagan Mariñez (in his directorial debut) and written by Jose Ramon Alama. Starring Cheddy García, Nashla Bogaert, Frank Perozo, Kenny Grullón, Jonathan Abreu, Carol Acosta, El Mayor Clásico, Yasser Michelén, Ovandy Camilo, Ana María Arias and Vicente Santos.

== Synopsis ==
A group of domestic employees are tired of the treatment received at the Pérez house. One day they discover a large sum of money that will arouse everyone's greed and revenge.

== Cast ==
The actors participating in this film are:

- Nashla Bogaert as Claribel
- Frank Perozo as Benito
- Cheddy García as Josefina
- Kenny Grullón as Sr. Pérez
- Jonathan Abreu as Napoleón
- Carol Acosta as Carmelina
- El Mayor Clásico as Tito
- Yasser Michelén as Rober
- Ovandy Camilo as Pepe
- Ana María Arias as Tata
- Vicente Santos as Ramón
- Victor Baujour as Vitilla
- Carlos Montesquieu as Detective
- Verónica Varela as Vero
- Sarodj Bertin as Pool girl
- Carasaf Sanchez as Delivery
- Ernesto Fadul as Himself
- Alfonso Rodríguez as Himself

== Release ==
It premiered on August 30, 2018, in Dominican theaters, to later be released on September 20, 2018, in Puerto Rican theaters. It premiered on October 26, 2018, in American theaters.

== Accolades ==
Year	Award	Category	Recipient	Result	Ref.
2019	La Silla Awards	Best Comedy	David Pagán	Nominated	
2019	La Silla Awards	Best Supporting Actor	Yasser Michelén	Won	
2019	La Silla Awards	Best Supporting Actress	Cheddy García	Nominated	
2019	La Silla Awards	Best Costume	Ana María Andrikson	Nominated	
2019	La Silla Awards	Best Special Effects	José Delio Ares & Jorge Morillo	Nominated	
