= Laura García-Godoy =

Dominican Republic actress

- Laura García-Godoy Oliva
- Born: Santiago de los Caballeros, Dominican Republic
- Years active: 2004–present
- Known for: Acting
- Parent(s): José Iván García-Godoy Redondo; Milagros Oliva
- Relatives: Federico García Godoy (great-great-grandfather); Pdt. Héctor García-Godoy (first cousin twice removed); Darío Suro García-Godoy (first cousin twice removed); Harold Priego García-Godoy (second cousin once removed);
- Laura García-Godoy on Twitter
- Biography for Laura García-Godoy at IMDb

Laura García-Godoy Oliva is a telenovela, theatre, film actress from the Dominican Republic.

García-Godoy was born in Santiago de los Caballeros. She is descended from Federico García Godoy (1857–1924), Cuban-born Dominican novelist, literary critic, historian and educator, son of Cuban-born Dominican poet and academician Federico García Copley (d.1890). She is also descended from Achille Fondeur, a Frenchman, brother of Colonel Furcy Fondeur.

In 2013, García-Godoy participated in the Luz García’s contest "Cuerpos hot del verano".

== Filmography ==
| Year | Title | Character | Director | Country |
|---|---|---|---|---|
| 2004 | Historia de un Destino (short) | La Flaca | Diego Sanchidrián | (Dominican Republic) |
| 2007 | Trópico (telenovela) | Mirna Zuyón | —N/a | (Dominican Republic) |
| 2008 | Excexos | Mother of Juan | José María Cabral | (Dominican Republic) |
| 2011 | Pimp Bullies | Julia | Alfonso Rodríguez | (Dominican Republic) |
| 2012 | El Rey de Najayo | La Flaca | Fernando Báez Mella | (Dominican Republic) |
| 2014 | La Extraña | Gaia | César Rodríguez | (Dominican Republic) |
| 2014 | Al Sur de la Inocencia | Verónica | Héctor Valdez | (Dominican Republic) |
| 2014 | El Pelotudo | —N/a | Raymond Hernández, Jr. | (Dominican Republic) |
