= Iván García Guerra =

Dominican-American actress (1938–2025)

- Born: Iván García Guerra; February 26, 1938; San Pedro de Macoris, Dominican Republic
- Died: March 22, 2025 (aged 87)
- Occupation: Actor
- Years active: 1955–2025
- Spouse: Frances Brenes Guridi
- Children: 4

Iván García Guerra (February 26, 1938 – March 22, 2025) was a Dominican theater actor, narrator, journalist, playwright, academic and director of theater. In 2015, he won the highest distinction granted by the Soberano Awards.

In honor of him, Arisleyda Beard, on January 5, 2010 founded the Iván García theater school and performance hall theater-school in the city of Puerto Plata.

== Career ==
García began as a theater actor in 1955 with The Great Theater of the World in the role of "El Pobre". His theatrical experiences comprise, in addition to all the stage techniques, acting, directing, dramaturgy and teaching staff. The first play he directed was Julius Caesar by William Shakespeare, in 1958. And his first dramatic creation, Beyond the Search, premiered at the 1st Dominican Theater Festival, held in Fine Arts in 1963.

He had published four books that include some of his pieces: Beyond the Search, Iván García Guerra Theater, Andrómaca and Portraits of a War; plus a storybook War is not for us, and Narrative anthology, which brings together thirty-one stories selected from their collections While dawn did not come, The sunset of Pisces, Tales of hidden hope, Easter, War is not for us, Trilogy, Twentieth Century and The Great Tale, autobiography in seven parts. Also, a work about Dominican history: Pilgrimage, translated into English and edited in both languages. Some of his plays and stories have been collected in Spanish, Argentine, Mexican, Venezuelan and German anthologies. His books are currently in the process of being published: Performance Manual, Direction Manual, Dramaturgy Manual, History of World Theater, History of Dominican Theater, Inferred History of Performance, an Encyclopedic Dictionary of Dominican Theater, a selection of new texts for theater, and Theater in verse and theatrical verses. Also, a poetic anthology: Cries and Meditations.

He was the founder of the Teatro de la Universidad Católica Madre y Maestra, where he taught Acting and Spanish Grammar classes during the years 1966 and 1967. In 1968 and 1969, he taught Spanish and Latin American Literature at the "College of Oswego" of the University of the State of New York. For ten years he was professor of Culture and Art at the "Yody Institute". In 1994 and 1995, Professor of Advertising Creativity at the Universidad Iberoamericana (UNIBE).

At the time of the reform of the School of Dramatic Art of Fine Arts he served as Director and since then he served as professor of Introduction to Theater, Acting, Theater Direction, Editing, Dramaturgy, Oral Expression and Dominicanity.

In the 2001/2002 school year, after his retirement as a Public Servant for 47 years, he was Guest Professor of Acting at the 2nd Level. During the 2001-2002 period, he lectured on Theater and Society at the Higher Institute of Fine Arts.

From 1995 to 2002, he was professor of Theater Performance, Direction and Production, Editing, Dramaturgy, and Director of the Department of Dramatic Art of the Institute of Culture and Art of Santiago. He also taught numerous courses on Acting, Theater Direction and Dramaturgy in the clubs of Santo Domingo, in the Culture Hall of the National Theater, in the Dominican American Cultural Institute, and in Casa de Arte and the Gran Teatro Cibao in Santiago.

== Political life ==
García participated in the "June 14 Movement" and later in the "June 14 Political Group." He was involved in the conspiracy to overthrow and kill the tyrant Rafael Leonidas Trujillo. He also participated in the Civil War of 1965. Since then, he had remained outside of partisan organizations, although he remained supportive and active with patriotic movements and the causes that he considered just.

== Death ==
García died on March 22, 2025, at the age of 87.

== See also ==
- List of Dominican Republic films
