= Roddy Pérez =

Roddy Alfredo Pérez Valerio
- Born: October 20, 1982 (age 43)
- Occupations: Film Producer, director and scriptwriter

Roddy Alfredo Pérez Valerio (born October 20, 1982), known professionally as Roddy Pérez is a film and music producer, director, actor and scriptwriter. He is the first Dominican in the history selected to the Berlinale Talents of the Berlin Film Festival, Germany. He is the founder and creator of Videoclip Awards and Dominican Film Market, officially the first film market in history of the Caribbean Region Film Industry. He won the Press Award in the Dominican Film Festival New York in 2021, and received an Audience Award in the Dominican Film Festival in 2019. He won in 2007 as the Iberoamerican Film Producer of The Year in the Morelia Lab of the Morelia International Film Festival (FICM).

Roddy Pérez was born in Santo Domingo, Dominican Republic. In 2019, he premiered his first feature film, Héroes de Junio. After ten years of development and investigation, Héroes de Junio became the first Dominican belic feature film with the participation of Cheddy García, Javier Grullón, Fausto Rojas, Claudette Lalí, Mario Peguero, Maurizio Alberino and Vlad Sosa, along with the support of Programa Ibermedia.

In the music industry, as a producer and an artist, Roddy Pérez has three albums produced in his repertoire. Station Me is the latter. In 2021, Roddy Pérez wrote three books published in 2021 and 2022 "100 Excelencias del Cine Dominicano", "Dembow Mundial" and "Dembow Versus Hip Hop", his first book.

== Filmography ==
Year	Title	Role	Country
2004	Images and Words	Producer/Director	Dominican Republic
2011	Unknown Heroes	Producer/Director	Dominican Republic
2012	Water	Producer/Director	Dominican Republic
2013	Charlie	Director	Cuba
2014	Blue	Producer	Dominican Republic
2019	Héroes de Junio	Producer/Director	Dominican Republic

== Official Website ==
- http://www.roddyperez.com
