= René Fortunato =

Dominican film director, screenwriter and producer (1958–2025)

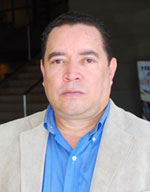
- Born: René Antonio Fortunato; February 1, 1958; Santo Domingo, Dominican Republic
- Died: July 18, 2025 (aged 67); Santo Domingo, Dominican Republic
- Occupations: Film director, producer, screenwriter
- Years active: 1985–2025

René Antonio Fortunato (February 1, 1958 – July 18, 2025) was a Dominican film director, producer and screenwriter. Fortunato is best known for his historical documentaries on Dominican government and politics. He began his career as a producer in 1985, with the production of In the Footsteps of Palau (Tras las huellas de Palau). Later in 1988, he gained national and international acclaim with the success of his third documentary April, the Trench of Honor (Abril: La Trinchera del Honor). Fortunato was awarded the Pitirre Prize for Best Caribbean Documentary in the 1990 San Juan Film Festival.

== Background ==
René Fortunato was born in Santo Domingo, Dominican Republic. He studied Social Communication at the University of Santo Domingo from 1982 until 1985. Simultaneously, he worked for several Santo Domingo television firms and stations in different aspects of television and film production. From 1978 to 1987, he published numerous articles about film and television in Dominican newspapers and cultural supplements.

Fortunato died from a rare form of cancer in Santo Domingo on July 18, 2025, at the age of 67.

== Career ==
Fortunato's first film In the Footsteps of Palau, was a 20-minute short that told the history of the first Dominican filmmaker Francisco Palau. Palau was active in the 1920s and was a seminal figure of Dominican filmography. His second film Frank Almánzar: Images of an artist, was debuted in 1987 and was about the Dominican visionary Bauhaus-trained engraver, illustrator and cultural animator Frank Almánzar. Then in 1988, he achieved national and international fame due to the success of his full-length documentary April, the Trench of Honor. The documentary won Best Documentary of the Caribbean region, in the II International San Juan Film Festival. The documentary is an account of the political situation in the Dominican Republic from the death of dictator Rafael Trujillo in 1961, to the election of Joaquín Balaguer in 1966. Particular focus goes into the 1965 civil war and the subsequent U.S. military invasion. After the success of his documentary, Fortunato went on to make documentaries about Trujillo, Balaguer, and Juan Bosch, which bridge Dominican history and politics from the 1940s to the 1990s.

== Filmography ==
- 1985: Tras las huellas de Palau (In the Footsteps of Palau)
- 1987: Frank Almanzar: Imágenes de un artista (Frank Almánzar: Images of an artist)
- 1988: Abril: La Trinchera del Honor (April: The Trench of Honor)
- 1991: Trujillo: El Poder del Jefe I (Trujillo: The Power of the Chief I)
- 1994: Trujillo: El Poder del Jefe II (Trujillo: The Power of the Chief II)
- 1996: Trujillo: El Poder del Jefe III (Trujillo: The Power of the Chief III)
- 1998: Balaguer: La Herencia del Tirano (Balaguer: The Inheritance of Tyranny)
- 2003: Balaguer: La Violencia del Poder (Balaguer: The Violence of Power)
- 2009: Juan Bosch: Presidente en la Frontera Imperial (Juan Bosch: President at the Imperial Border)
- 2017: Patricia: El Regreso del Sueño (Patricia: The Return of the Dream)
- 2023: Caamaño: Militar a Guerrillero (Caamaño: Military to Guerrilla)
- 2024: El Laberinto de la Injusticia (The Labyrinth of Injustice)
- 2025: Triunfo de la Democracia (The Triumph of Democracy)

== See also ==
- List of Dominican Republic films
