= El peor comediante del mundo =

- Theatrical release poster
- Directed by: Luis Corporán
- Written by: Miguel Alcántara
- Produced by: Luis Lora
- Starring: Miguel Alcántara; Phillip Rodríguez
- Cinematography: Miguel Ángel Magallanes
- Edited by: Luis Corporán
- Production companies: Imakonos; La Brújula Films
- Release date: August 17, 2017
- Running time: 97 minutes
- Country: Dominican Republic
- Language: Spanish

El peor comediante del mundo (lit. 'The worst comedian in the world') is a 2017 Dominican comedy-drama film directed by Luis Corporán and written by Miguel Alcántara who co-stars along with Phillip Rodriguez. It premiered on August 17, 2017, in Dominican theaters.

== Synopsis ==
Aurelio is a comedian who is more than paying the price of fame. His indiscipline and the way he manages his career has encouraged his exclusion from the stage. Now, locked in his house all day and with nothing to do, he lives the worst moment of his life remembering his past glories. Martha, his wife, has abandoned him, like all those who surrounded him in the bonanza, he only has the company of his artistic manager and best friend, Antonio, who seek justifications for their misfortunes with a slight manifestation towards hope.

== Cast ==
The actors participating in this film are:

- Phillip Rodríguez as Aurelio
- Miguel Alcántara as Antonio
- Alina Vargas as Martha
- Ovandy Camilo as Piñoño
- Oscar Carrasquillo as Benítez
- Richard Douglas as Piñoño's uncle
- Fausto Mata as Car Seller
- Tony Pascual as Pot Seller
- Rafael Alduey as Policeman
- Ana María Arias as Bus Passenger
- Luis Cruciel as Neighborhood man
- Jacqueline Estrella as Teacher
- Raúl Grisanty as Presenter
- Fidia Peralta as Lidia 'la intensa'
- Juan Carlos Pichardo Jr. as Tack Seller
- José Enrique Pintor as Guevara Matías
- Fernando Pucheu as Yiyo

== Accolades ==
Year	Award	Category	Recipient	Result	Ref.
2018	La Silla Awards	Best Comedy	Luis Corporán P.	Nominated	
2018	La Silla Awards	Best Producer	Miguel Alcántara, Francis Disla & Luis Lora	Nominated	
