= Dominican Film Market =

Dominican Film Market (DFM) is officially the first film market of the history in the Caribbean region film industry, holding its first edition in November 2014 in Santo Domingo, Dominican Republic . approximately 4000 people attended and featured with invited countries as Taiwan and Brazil, as well as producers from the United States, Mexico, France, Kazakhstan and Russia.

During three days DFM welcomes producers, directors, distributors, investors, technicians and entrepreneurs from the film industry in the Caribbean Region.

== History ==
Dominican Film Market™ was created and founded by Roddy Pérez and Nurgul Shayakhmetova, executives producers of Audiovisual Dominicana™. DFM in the first edition was sponsored by the Dominican Republic Council of Cinema DGCINE, the Dominican Republic Export and Investment Center CEI-RD and the Dominican Republic Ministry of Tourism, Dominican Film Market 2014 was supported by Blackmagic Design, Nikon, Panasonic and more than 30 important brands.
