= The Fisherman's Daughter =

- Dominican theatrical release poster
- Spanish: La estrategia del mero
- Directed by: Edgar Alberto De Luque Jácome
- Written by: Edgar Alberto De Luque Jácome
- Produced by: Annabelle Mullen
- Starring: Roamir Pineda; Nathalia Rincón
- Cinematography: Rafael González
- Edited by: Karen Akerman; Nicolás Herran; Ricardo Pretti
- Music by: Rudah Guedes; Pedro Sodré
- Production companies: Belle Films; Bubbles Project; Kromaki; Larimar Films; Séptima Films
- Release dates: November 16, 2023 (PÖFF); June 26, 2025 (Colombia); September 4, 2025 (Dominican Republic)
- Running time: 80 minutes
- Countries: Colombia; Dominican Republic; Brazil; Puerto Rico
- Language: Spanish

The Fisherman's Daughter (Spanish: La estrategia del mero, lit. 'The grouper fish strategy') is a 2023 drama film written and directed by Edgar Alberto De Luque Jácome in his directorial debut. It is about the reunion between a fishing father and his transgender daughter. The cast made up of Roamir Pineda, Nathalia Rincón, Modesto Lacén, Erick Rodríguez Vásquez and Angela Bernal.

It is a co-production between Colombia, the Dominican Republic, Brazil and Puerto Rico.

== Synopsis ==
Samuel, a traditional fisherman who lungfishes for grouper, reunites with his son, Priscila, who returns home as a transgender woman and seeks refuge after being framed for murder.

== Cast ==
- Roamir Pineda as Samuel
- Nathalia Rincón as Priscila
- Modesto Lacén as Rula
- Erick Rodríguez Vásquez
- Jesús Romero as Miguelito
- Roosevel Gonzalez as Ruperto
- Angela Bernal
- Henry Barrios as Grimaldo

== Production ==
The film was scheduled to be shot in Puerto Rico, but Donald Trump's first presidency, Hurricane Maria, and the subsequent COVID-19 pandemic delayed filming for more than a year. In the end, principal photography took place in Colombia, with underwater scenes filmed in the Dominican Republic.

== Release ==
The Fisherman's Daughter had its world premiere on November 16, 2023, at the 27th Tallinn Black Nights Film Festival in the First Feature Competition section, then was screened on November 9, 2024, at the 13th Dominican Film Festival in New York, and on June 28, 2025, at the 25th Cuenca International Film Festival.

The film was released commercially on June 16, 2025, in Colombian theaters, and on September 4, 2025, in Dominican theaters.

== Accolades ==
Award / Festival	Date of ceremony	Category	Recipient(s)	Result	Ref.
Tallinn Black Nights Film Festival	19 November 2023	First Feature Competition - Best Film Award	The Fisherman's Daughter	Nominated	
Dominican Film Festival in New York	13 November 2024	Best Feature Film	The Fisherman's Daughter	Nominated	
Dominican Film Festival in New York	13 November 2024	Best Actor	Roamir Pineda	Won	
Havana Film Festival	13 December 2024	Best Fiction Feature Film	The Fisherman's Daughter	Nominated	
Havana Film Festival	13 December 2024	Best Unpublished Screenplay	Edgar Alberto De Luque Jácome	Won	
La Silla Awards	19 June 2025	Best First Feature	The Fisherman's Daughter	Won	
Cuenca Film Festival	30 June 2025	Best Fiction	The Fisherman's Daughter	Won	
