= Welcome to Paradise (film) =

- Theatrical release poster
- Spanish: Bienvenidos al paraíso
- Directed by: Ani Alva Helfer
- Written by: José Ramón Alamá
- Produced by: José Ramón Alamá
- Starring: Tatiana Calmell
- Cinematography: Juan Carlos Gómez
- Edited by: Renato Constantino
- Music by: Sergio J. Lacima
- Production companies: Bou Group; La Soga Producciones
- Distributed by: Star Distribution LA; BF Distribution
- Release date: March 28, 2024
- Running time: 100 minutes
- Countries: Peru; Dominican Republic
- Language: Spanish

Welcome to Paradise (Spanish: Bienvenidos al paraíso) is a 2024 romantic comedy film directed Ani Alva Helfer and written by José Ramón Alamá. It stars Tatiana Calmell accompanied by Andrés Salas, Vicente Santos, Franco Cabrera, Patricia Barreto, Yisney Lagrange, Katia Condos and Bruno Odar. It premiered on March 28, 2024, in Peruvian theaters.

== Synopsis ==
Kiki and Lucas, a young couple, travel to the Dominican Republic to get married. The future in-laws, Sofía and Gonzalo, are not very happy with the decision, but their best friends Cata and Miki do everything possible to make the marriage perfect. A paradisiacal place, a dream wedding, an ideal couple and luxury guests; the perfect combination for disaster.

== Cast ==
The actors participating in this film are:

- Tatiana Calmell as Kiki
- Andrés Salas as Lucas
- Vicente Santos as Vicente
- Franco Cabrera as Miki
- Patricia Barreto as Cata
- Yisney Lagrange as Mónica
- Katia Condos as Sofía
- Bruno Odar as Gonzalo

== Production ==
Principal photography began on May 15, 2023, on the beaches of the Dominican Republic.
