= Nuryn Sanlley =

- Born: Nuryn Sanlley Pou; September 18, 1952; Santo Domingo, Dominican Republic
- Died: April 30, 2012 (aged 59); Santo Domingo, Dominican Republic
- Other name: La Pinky
- Education: Teatro Nacional Eduardo Brito
- Spouse: Edgar Peña
- Children: Catherine Dianne, Yelitza Haimara, Edgar Alejandro
- Relatives: Irvin Alberti (son-in-law, married to Yelitza Haimara)

Comedy career
- Years active: 19??–2011
- Medium: Fictional character Television; Stand-up
- Genre: Comedy
- Subjects: Character comedy Talent show

Nuryn Sanlley Pou (known as La Pinky, September 18, 1952 – April 30, 2012) was a Dominican character and comic actress, best known for her popular character La Pinky, who for more than 25 years was part of the lives of Dominican children.

She died from a brain tumor on the night of April 30, 2012.

== Biography ==
Sanlley was the daughter of Tomás José Sanlley Gómez and Nury Amada Pou Ortiz; from her childhood she loved the acting and singing. Finally in the 70s she began to practice as an actress and singer, participated in programs including El Show del Medio Día beside Roberto Salcedo and Freddy Beras Goico. She retired from the national art media to devote to their children and what became her most famous character, but continued her acting career.

La Pinky was a celebrity since she was an eight-year-old girl, starring Nuryn Sanlley for generations and was part of children's entertainment in the Dominican Republic. It was presented more than 23 times in the Teatro Nacional Eduardo Brito (once per year) which was supported by thousands of children, and had a segment on the Sunday variety program El Gordo de la Semana Freddy Beras-Goico. It was characterized by using a red dress with white dots with an unusual make-up.
