= Pérez Rodríguez =

- Theatrical release poster
- Directed by: Humberto Tavárez
- Written by: Humberto Tavárez
- Produced by: Rafael Elias Munoz
- Starring: Cuquín Victoria; Xiomara Rodríguez; Lisbeth Santos; Luis José German; Stephany Liriano; Joshua Wagner; Rolando Herrand; Ángela Gómez
- Cinematography: Sebastián Cabrera Chelin
- Edited by: Nacho Ruiz Capillas
- Music by: Axel Mansilla; Alex Masilla; Ernesto Paredano
- Production company: Lantica Media
- Release dates: October 29, 2024 (Downtown Center); October 31, 2024 (Dominican Republic)
- Running time: 103 minutes
- Country: Dominican Republic
- Languages: Spanish; English

Pérez Rodríguez is a 2024 Dominican satirical tragicomedy film (Note: Film genre based on references:) written and directed by Humberto Tavárez in his directorial debut. It follows the life of the Pérez Rodríguez family through three celebrations that expose their idiosyncrasies and secrets. It features an ensemble cast made up of Cuquín Victoria, Xiomara Rodríguez, Lisbeth Santos, Luis José German, Stephany Liriano, Joshua Wagner, Rolando Herrand and Ángela Gómez.

== Synopsis ==
The Pérez Rodríguez family is a Dominican family that goes through different stages marked by the birth of Juan Carlos and the death of the patriarch Juancho, unleashing secrets and conflicts that force family members to redefine their family ties.

== Cast ==
- Cuquín Victoria as Juancho
- Xiomara Rodríguez as María
- Lisbeth Santos as Cristina
- Luis José German as Carlos
- Stephany Liriano as Carmen
- Joshua Wagner as Javier
- Rolando Herrand as Efraín
- Ángela Gómez as Mercedes
- Ernesto Baez as Gilberto
- Pamela De León as Laura
- Clara Alexandra Hinojosa as Miosotis
- Axel Mansilla as Daniel
- Carlos Pimentel
- Luis Agustín Silfa as Yansel
- María Angélica Ureña as Rosita

== Release ==
Pérez Rodríguez had its world premiere on October 29, 2024, at the Downtown Center, followed by a wide national theatrical release on October 31. It was subsequently screened on February, 3, 2025, at the 17th Santo Domingo Global Film Festival, and on March 19, 2025, at the 28th Málaga Film Festival.

International rights were acquired by Latido Films.

== Accolades ==
Award / Festival	Date of ceremony	Category	Recipient(s)	Result	Ref.
Santo Domingo Global Film Festival	7 February 2025	Best First Fiction Feature	Pérez Rodríguez	Nominated	
Soberano Awards	25 March 2025	Best Film - Drama	Pérez Rodríguez	Nominated	
Soberano Awards	25 March 2025	Best Director	Humberto Tavárez	Won	
Soberano Awards	25 March 2025	Best Film Actor	Luis José Germán	Nominated	
Soberano Awards	25 March 2025	Best Film Actress	Stephany Liriano	Nominated	
ADOPRESCI Awards	7 August 2025	Best Fiction Film	Rafael Elías Muñoz	Won	
ADOPRESCI Awards	7 August 2025	Best Director	Humberto Tavárez	Won	
ADOPRESCI Awards	7 August 2025	Best Actress	Stephany Liriano	Nominated	
ADOPRESCI Awards	7 August 2025	Best Actress	Lizbeth Santos	Nominated	
ADOPRESCI Awards	7 August 2025	Best Actor	Joshua Wagner	Won	
ADOPRESCI Awards	7 August 2025	Best Screenplay	Humberto Tavárez	Won	
ADOPRESCI Awards	7 August 2025	Best Cinemaphotography	Sebastián Cabrera	Nominated	
ADOPRESCI Awards	7 August 2025	Best Musicalization	Axel Mansilla & Ernesto Paredano	Nominated	
ADOPRESCI Awards	7 August 2025	Best Editing	Nacho Ruíz Capillas	Nominated	
ADOPRESCI Awards	7 August 2025	Best Sound	Jonás Rodríguez	Nominated	
ADOPRESCI Awards	7 August 2025	Best Costume Design	Mónica de Moya	Nominated	
ADOPRESCI Awards	7 August 2025	Best Cast	Pérez Rodríguez	Nominated	
