= Nueba Yol =

1995 film

- Film poster
- Directed by: Ángel Muñiz
- Written by: Ángel Muñiz
- Starring: Luisito Martí
- Release date: 16 August 1995
- Running time: 106 minutes
- Country: Dominican Republic
- Languages: Spanish; Fula; English

Nueba Yol (Spanish: Nueba Yol: Por fin llegó Balbuena) is a 1995 Dominican comedy-drama film directed by Ángel Muñiz. The film was selected as the Dominican entry for the Best Foreign Language Film at the 68th Academy Awards, but was not accepted as a nominee.

== Cast ==
- Luisito Martí as Balbuena
- Caridad Ravelo as Nancy
- Raúl Carbonell as Fellito
- Rafael Villalona as Pedro
- Joel Garcia as Pancho

== See also ==
- List of submissions to the 68th Academy Awards for Best Foreign Language Film
- List of Dominican submissions for the Academy Award for Best Foreign Language Film
