= Grupo Vimenca =

Group of financial services companies

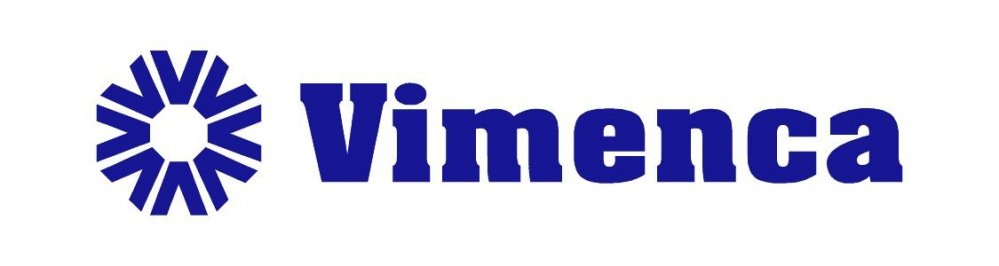
- Type: Private
- Industry: Money Transfer, Banking Services, Business Process Outsourcing, Outsourcing, Multiple Payments Services
- Founded: 1950; 76 years ago
- Founder: Victor Méndez Capellán
- Headquarters: Santo Domingo, Dominican Republic
- Key people: Victor Méndez Capellán, President (Chairman)
- Website: vimenca.com

Grupo Vimenca is a privately held group of financial services companies in Dominican Republic with headquarter in Santo Domingo. It was established in 1950 by President and Founder of the group Victor Méndez Capellán. This family-owned company that began as a small business with one employee, today offers consumers global money transfer services through Western Union, in addition to banking, mortgage, business- to-business call center services, international holders and parcel services and multiply payments services.

== History ==
Grupo Vimenca was founded in 1950 by Víctor Méndez Capellán in Santo Domingo. What began as a modest wholesale lottery ticket business quickly expanded into other ventures, including travel services and the distribution of household appliances through Refrigeración Dominicana. These early steps reflected the founder’s entrepreneurial instinct and his ability to seize opportunities in a growing Dominican economy.

During the 1960s and 1970s, the group diversified even further. It entered the housing construction sector, food production, and agriculture, laying the foundation for what would later become a true multisector business group. During this period, Víctor Méndez Capellán built a reputation as a pioneer, always willing to innovate and explore new industries.

The 1980s marked a turning point with the company’s entry into financial services. In 1983, Vimenca established Banco de Cambio Vimenca, specializing in foreign exchange and money transfers. Just a few years later, in 1989, the group founded Remesas Vimenca, becoming the exclusive agent of Western Union in the Dominican Republic. This was a milestone for the country, as remittances would soon become one of its most important sources of household income. Around that same time, Grupo Vimenca also introduced the first international credit card in the Dominican Republic through American Express (AMEX). This innovation revolutionized access to credit in the country and positioned the group at the forefront of financial modernization.

In the 1990s, the company continued to expand into new areas. It launched TeleVimenca, a communications company, and Vimenpaq, a courier and package delivery service in partnership with TransExpress. These initiatives extended Grupo Vimenca’s reach beyond remittances and banking, reinforcing its role in logistics and connectivity.

The early 2000s brought consolidation and modernization. In 2002, the group established Banco Múltiple Vimenca, a full-service bank, and in 2004, it created Data Vimenca, a call center and Business Process Outsourcing (BPO) company serving international clients. By then, Grupo Vimenca had become a truly diversified conglomerate, integrating finance, logistics, and customer service solutions.

The 2010s were marked by digital innovation. In 2014, Grupo Vimenca launched PagaTodo, a platform that centralized bill payments and everyday services into a single network. The group also strengthened its nationwide presence, expanded digital banking, and developed modern financial services to meet the needs of an increasingly connected population.

The 2020s have been a period of transition and legacy. In February 2023, founder Víctor Méndez Capellán died at the age of 94, leaving behind an extraordinary entrepreneurial legacy that transformed the Dominican business landscape. That same year, the presidency of the group passed to his son, Víctor Virgilio Méndez Saba, who had already held leadership roles, including the presidency of Banco Vimenca. Today, Grupo Vimenca employs more than 2,300 people and continues to play a central role in the Dominican economy, especially in the areas of remittances, financial services, and innovative solutions like the introduction of AMEX credit cards, which marked a before and after in the country’s financial system.

== Subsidiaries of Grupo Vimenca (2024) ==
The main operating subsidiaries of Grupo Vimenca are:

Remesas Vimenca: Exclusive agent of Western Union in the Dominican Republic since 1989. It has a network of over 300 service points nationwide, facilitating domestic and international money transfers.

Banco Múltiple Vimenca: Established in 2002, it offers full banking services, including savings accounts, personal and corporate loans, and foreign exchange services.

Data Vimenca: Founded in 2004, it is an outsourcing company providing customer service solutions, technical support, and sales management, with over 500 employees. In 2024, Data Vimenca was recognized as one of the leading BPO companies in the Dominican Republic.

Vimenpaq: A partnership with TransExpress, a U.S.-based company, offering international parcel and delivery services. It operates in more than 80 countries.

PagaTodo: A multiple payments services platform with over 400 service points nationwide, enabling bill payments, top-ups, and other services. In 2024, PagaTodo launched a credit card with exclusive benefits for service payments.
