= Mi novia está de madre =

Mi novia está de madre is a Dominican comedy movie released in the summer of 2007. The film stars Roberto Salcedo, Mexican actress Patricia Manterola, and merengue singer Eddy Herrera.
