= Bestia de Cardo =

2014 film

Bestia de Carlo
- Film poster
- Directed by: Virginia Sánchez Navarro
- Screenplay by: Virginia Sánchez Navarro
- Produced by: Starsha Gill; Rosie Hernandez; Virginia Sánchez Navarro (co-producer)
- Starring: Virginia Sánchez Navarro; Angélica Aragón; Jorge Luis Moreno
- Cinematography: Diego Garcia
- Edited by: Daniel Castro Zimbrón; Virginia Sánchez Navarro
- Music by: Nico Casal
- Production companies: Imaginairo Film and Theatre
- Release date: October 2014 (Austin Film Festival)
- Running time: 99 minutes
- Countries: United States; Dominican Republic
- Language: Spanish

Bestia de Cardo (English title: Beast of Cardo) is a feature film written by, directed, and starring the actress/filmmaker Virginia Sánchez Navarro. The film was shot in 2013 in the Dominican Republic and production was finished in 2014. The cast includes Navarro and the Mexican actors Angélica Aragón (The Crime of Father Amaro, A Walk in the Clouds) and Jorge Luis Moreno (Criósfera, Niñas Mal, El Estudiante) and the Dominican actors Cheddy García, Karina Noble, Héctor Then, Sara Jorge, Mario Peguero, Christian Alvarez and Johnnie Mercedes.

The film was funded through the Dominican Film Law which attracts private investment into the local film industry.

In 2015, the film was screened at the Cinequest Film Festival.

== Plot ==
Bestia de Cardo is a melancholy study of social pressure. It tells the story of Moira, a wealthy, Dominican young woman with a history of mental delusions, who is forced to return permanently to her hometown, Cardo, to the two-faced society that she had left behind.

Moira is ill-tempered but spineless, and she follows her parents’ orders, helping them to gain prestige so that their upcoming traditional new year’s eve party will be successful. However, she makes a mistake that endangers her family’s reputation even more.

Moira befriends a tailor, Hermes, who urges her to flee the town by supernatural means. As they put their plans in action, Moira and Hermes find themselves drawn to one another. The people of Cardo are unforgiving, and escape seems improbable.

== Cast ==
- Virginia Sánchez Navarro (Moira Cruz-Daruich)
- Angélica Aragón (Victoria Daruich)
- Jorge Luis Moreno (Hermes)
- Cheddy García (Melody)
- Karina Noble (Onelia Nocci)
- Héctor Then (The Man)
- Mauricio Bustamante (Crazy Clock)
- Jhonnie Mercedes (Chauffeur)
- Omar Ramírez (Omar Cruz)
- Sarah Jorge (Sara)
- Christian Alvarez (Guillermo)
- Raquel Estevez (Laura)
- Mario Peguero (Paul)
- Bernardita García (Magaly)
- Paolo Modolo (Sergio Nocci)
- Jalsen Santana (Sara's husband)
- Mabel Santos (Cocó)

== Release ==
Bestia de Cardo had its world premiere at the 21st Austin Film Festival hosted from October 23 to 30, 2014.
