= Yarissa =

Dominican YouTuber

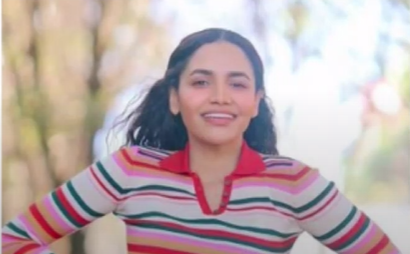
- Born: Yarissa Jessenia Rodríguez Taveras; April 12, 1990 (age 35); Santiago de los Caballeros

YouTube information
- Channel: Yarissa
- Years active: 2015–present
- Subscribers: 3.43 million
- Views: 252 million
- Last updated: October 21, 2025

Yarissa Rodríguez Taveras (born April 12, 1990), better known as Yarissa, is a YouTuber from the Dominican Republic. She is known for her fashion videos.

== Career ==
Yarissa began making her videos in July 2015. She earned her first 1,000 subscribers in less than two months. Her videos focus on makeup, outfits, recipes and vlogging in general.

In 2016 she gained 100,000 subscribers on her channel. In 2017, she signed a contract of representation with Univisión Network.

In December 2019, she obtained more than 3.5 million subscribers on YouTube and is considered the channel with the highest number of subscribers in the Dominican Republic. She produces content for the Internet and television.

== Personal life ==
Yarissa was born in Santiago de los Caballeros, Dominican Republic. She graduated in 2014 with a degree in social communication with an emphasis in audiovisual production, at the Pontificia Universidad Católica Madre y Maestra.

== Awards and nominations ==
Year	Award	Category	Result	Ref(s)
2021	Premios Soberano	YouTuber Favorito 2020	Nominated	
2019	Latin Videoclip Awards	Mejor YouTuber Latino	Nominated	
