= Juan Delancer =

- Juan Delancer on the set of Trópico de Sangre
- Born: Santo Domingo, Dominican Republic
- Occupations: Writer, journalist, Film director, Screenwriter
- Years active: 1981–present

Juan Delancer is a Dominican writer, journalist, screenwriter and film director.

== Career ==
Delancer got his start as a writer, researcher, journalist, documentarian and television producer in the Dominican Republic throughout the 1980s and 1990s before beginning work on his first feature film debut, Trópico de Sangre, which tells the story of the Mirabal sisters in times of Rafael Trujillo dictatorship, and is co-produced by and starring actress Michelle Rodriguez. He has served en public administration as ambassador to Uruguay and private secretary of Dr.Leonel Fernández, current Presidente of Dominican Republic as well as director of the State Public Television CERTV. His book "Launching of Glory" -Desembarco de la Gloria-about guerrillas expeditions that in 1959 intended to overthrew Rafael Trujillo dictatorship, is one of the main sources for Dominican scholars who studies that historical period.

== Filmography ==
- Trópico de Sangre (2009) – Writer-Director
- Documentaries "Antes de que se Vayan" (2003) - Writer-Director
- "Bravo, Molina" (1997) - Writer-Director
- "Un Príncipe se Confiesa" (1988) - Writer-Director
