= Jorge Luis Moreno =

Mexican actor, producer, writer and director

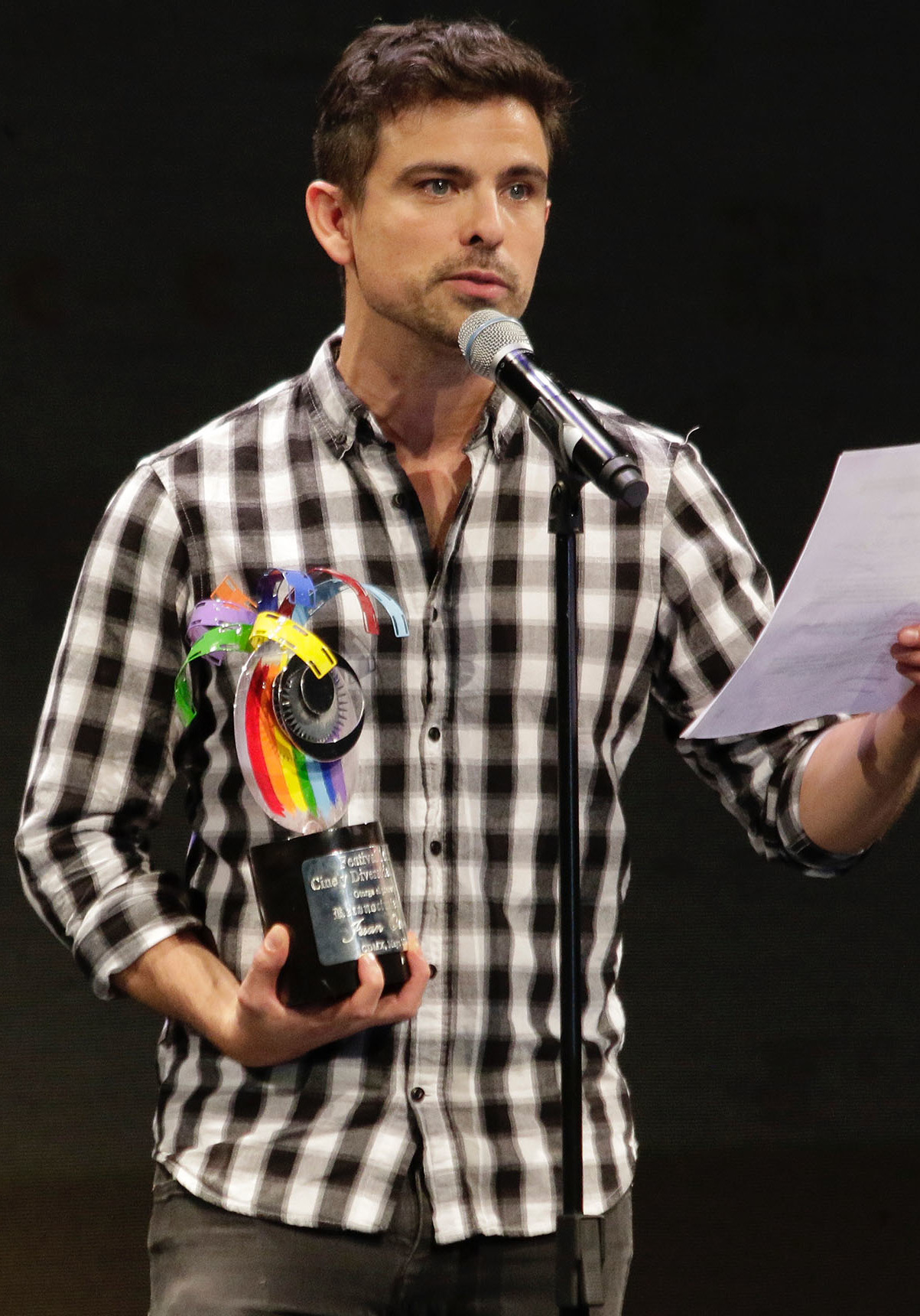
- Moreno in 2019
- Born: Jorge Luis Moreno Abril; 19 December 1981 (age 43); Hermosillo, Sonora, Mexico
- Occupation(s): Actor, producer, writer, director
- Years active: 2004–present

Jorge Luis Moreno Abril (born December 19, 1981) is a Mexican actor, producer, writer and director.

== Filmography ==
=== Film roles ===
Year	Title	Roles	Notes
2005	Anónimos	Jorge	Short film
2006	El corazón invadido	Gabriel	Short film
2007	Niñas Mal	Ángel	
2007	Déficit	Charlie	
2008	Un pequeño error	Director	Short film
2008	Philia	Carlos	Short film
2008	En la luz del sol brillante	Sebastián	Short film
2009	El estudiante	Marcelo	
2009	H.	Kurt	Short film
2011	Ella y el candidato	Iñigo	
2011	Contratiempo	Carlos	
2012	Mariachi Gringo	Rough Youngster	
2012	Cristiada	Pablo	
2012	El capitán	Marcelo	Short film
2013	Me late chocolate	Xavi	
2013	Cinco de Mayo: La batalla	Sargento Vaché	
2014	Four Moons	Enrique	
2015	Camarillo St.	Jake	Short film
2015	Bestia de Cardo	Hermes	
2015	Ladronas de almas	Artemio	
2015	Mexico's Eyes	Pedro Infante	Short film
2016	Nocturno	Jorge Armando Lafayette	
2017	El silencio es bienvenido	Joel	
2017	Desde el más allá	Carlos	
2017	Cygnus	Fabián Ocampo	
2018	Mi Mariachi	Eduardo	
2018	Motel Acqua	Muzquiz	

=== Television roles ===
Year	Title	Roles	Notes
2004	La vida es una canción	Unknown role	Episode: "En el 2000"
2010	Las Aparicio	Bruno	Recurring role
2010	Los Minondo	Pedro	1 episode
2013	Niñas Mal	Moi Agami	2 episodes
2015–2017	El Señor de los Cielos	Víctor Casillas Jr.	Series regular (season 3–5); 225 episodes
2016	El Chema	Víctor Casillas Jr.	Episode: "Narco en la TV"
2018	Mi familia perfecta	José María Guerrero "El Patas"	Main role; 69 episodes
2019	El Barón	Joe Fernández	Main role; 58 episodes
2021	Buscando a Frida	Ángel Olvera	Main Role
2025	La Jefa	Ignacio Pérez "Don Nacho"	Main Role
