= Carnival in the Dominican Republic =

Festival season in the Dominican Republic

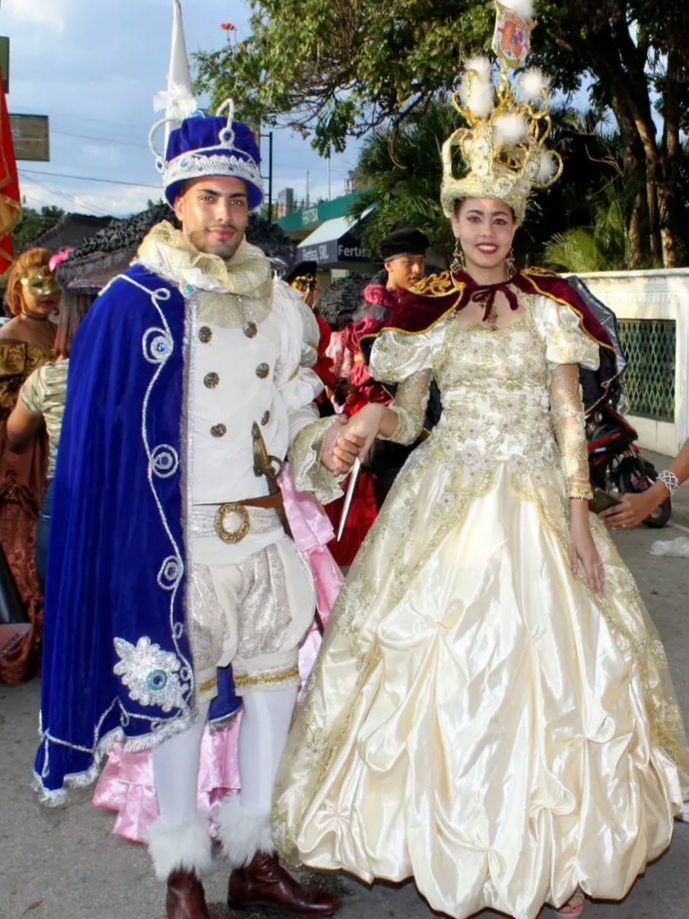
Dominican Republic carnival parade costumes in San Juan de la Maguana

The Carnival in the Dominican Republic is celebrated in most cities and towns in the main streets of the country. Among its most notable characteristics are its flashy elaborate costumes and traditional masks. The carnival held in the city of La Vega, which is one of the biggest in the country, and the national parade in Santo Domingo, where the first Carnivals held in the Americas in the early 1500s.

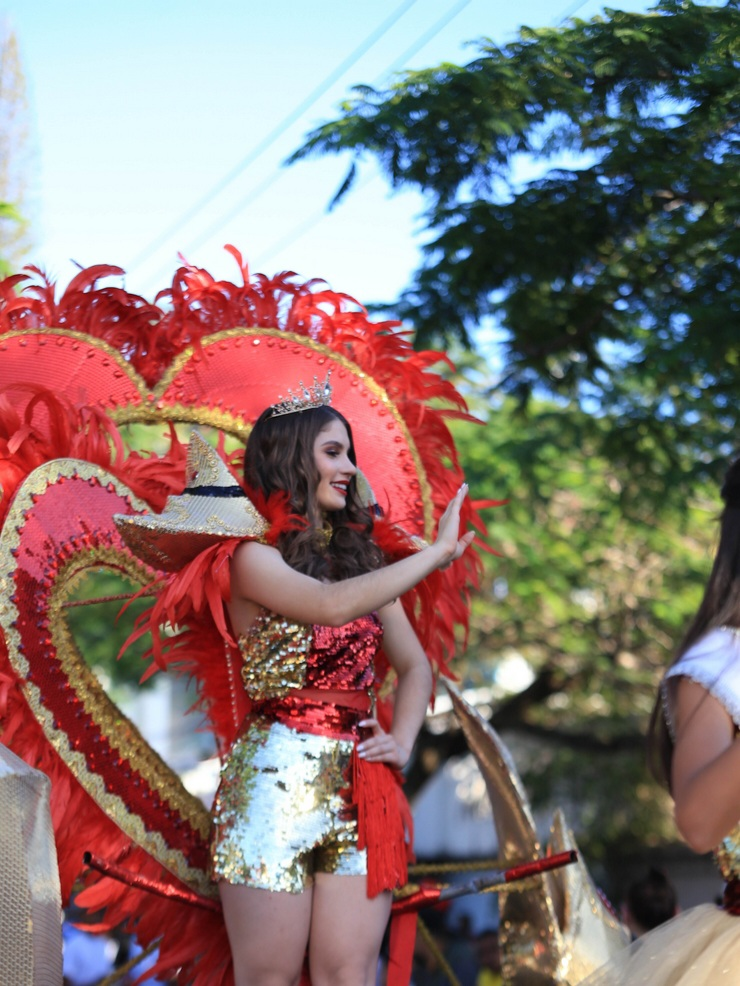
Dominican Republic Carnival parade in La Vega

The carnival season in the Dominican Republic kicks off with a carnival gala held indoors in Santiago de los Caballeros, as opposed to every other carnival event held outdoors throughout the month of February. Dominicans are usually most festive on February 27, which is the Dominican Independence Day. In Santo Domingo, celebrations include a large military display with the Dominican air force, navy, and army. Festivities often include the wearing of colorful costumes that symbolize Dominican religious and traditional characters such as Calife, Guloya, and Diablo Cojuelo. Festivities take place all over the island, with each town adding its own twist to the celebration.

The timing of the festivals has grown apart from its original religious synchronization with the period of Lent. With National Independence Day on 27 February and the birthday of Juan Pablo Duarte, its founding father, on 26 January, the Carnival celebrations fill February regardless of the Lenten calendar. Traditional parades are held every Sunday throughout the month of independence in the Dominican Republic.

== History ==
The Spanish conquistadors who settled on the island brought the Carnival culture from Europe, though the Roman Catholic authorities of the time considered this to be a Pagan celebration, and therefore mixed Christian traditions into it and began to celebrate the event as well.

Evidence has been found in the ruins of La Vega Vieja (near the present day La Vega) showing that Carnival has been celebrated in the Dominican Republic since 1510. The celebration originally consisted of the residents of the island dressing themselves as Moors and Christians.

Though it is not known for certain, it is thought that the colony of Santo Domingo was the first place in the Americas to have a pre-Lenten costume. The celebration became a way to escape from the rigid religious traditions brought from the old world. By the late 1700s, the carnival had become a major celebration in the colony. Then on February 27, 1844, when the Dominican Republic won its independence from Haiti, the celebration grew even greater in popularity, as the country's Independence Day celebrations were combined into the pre-existing carnival celebrations.

== Symbols ==
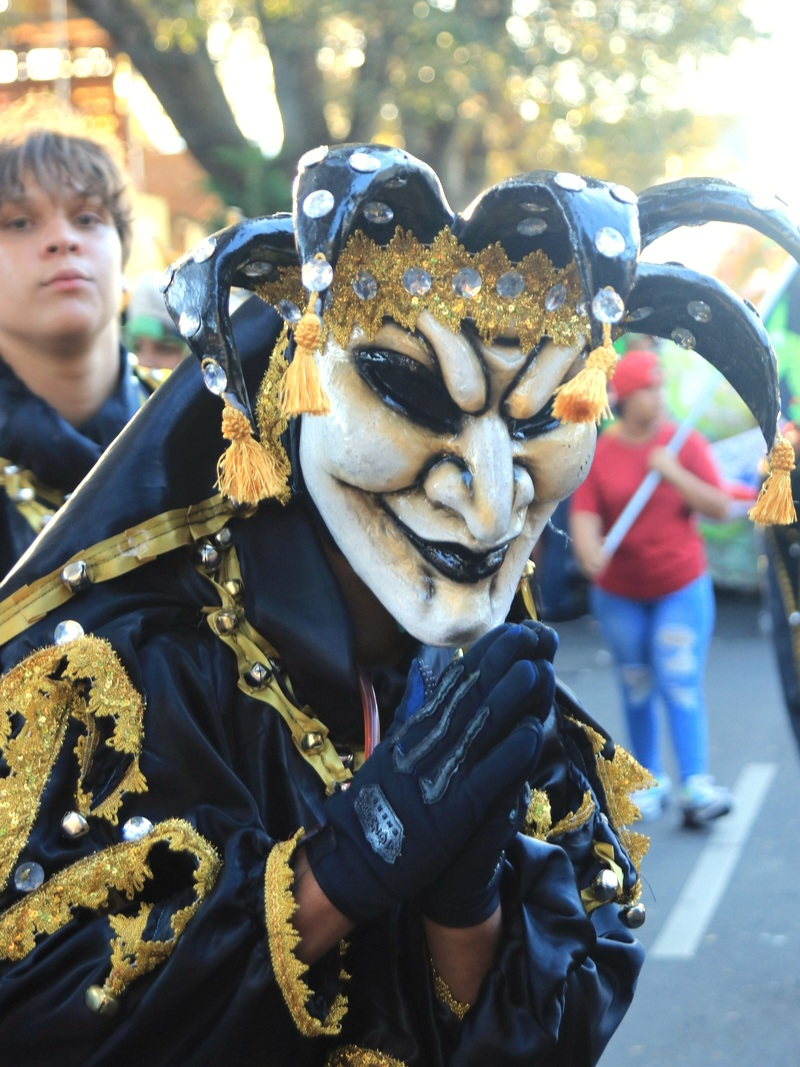
Dominican Republic carnival mask in La Vega.

Carnival masks are elaborate and the costumes used on the parades are satires of the Devil and are called "Diablos Cojuelos". They dance, and run to the rhythm of merengue music mixed with other Latin and Caribbean rhythms. Additional allegorical characters represent Dominican traditions such as "Roba la Gallina" and "Califé".

One of the most international parades is in San Pedro de Macorís. It exhibits the "Guloyas" parade of costumed groups dancing in the streets. Revelers flee from the "Diablos Cojuelos" who try to hit them with "Vejigas".

== Characters ==
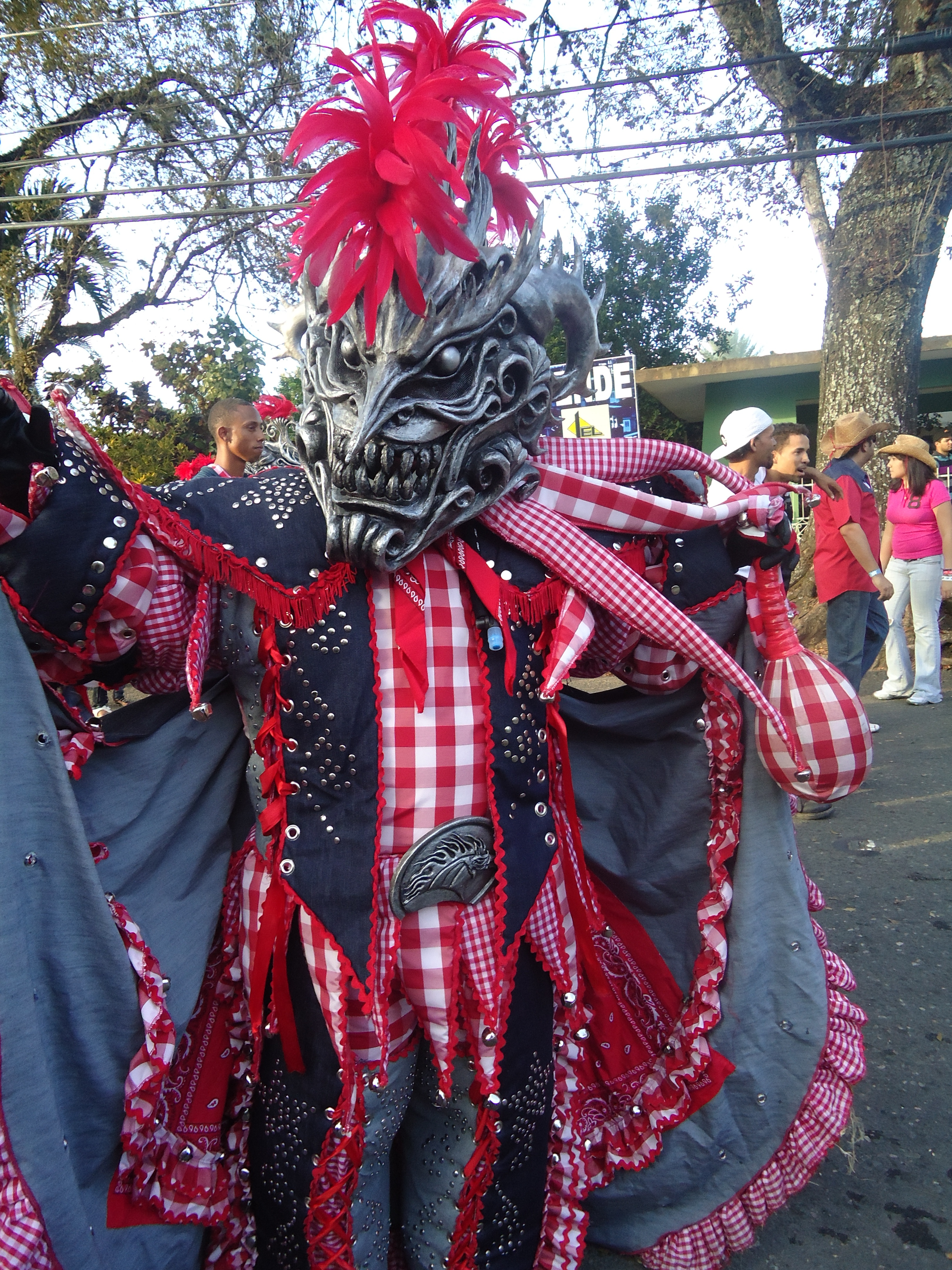
Dominican Republic carnival mask and costume of the diablo cojuelo.

While there are many characters in the various versions of the carnival across the island, there are several prominent ones featured in most celebrations:

- Diablo Cojuelo (Limping Devil): is the main character of the carnival. A tale on the island says that this devil was banished to earth because of his childish pranks. When he hit the earth he hurt his leg, causing him to limp. While most of the communities across the island represent this character in different ways, several common practices are the use of a mask, a satanic suit, sleigh bells, and a whip or "Vejiga" (an animal bladder filled with air) to hit people in the streets (other "Diablos"). A Dominican tale claims that the mask is meant to represent the Spaniards who came to the island and enslaved and whipped the natives.
- Roba la Gallina (Steal the Chicken): is a festivity that satires the fact that some people used to steal chickens from farms. This often consists of a man dressing up as a woman who just stole a chicken. This character often carries a large purse with candy inside for the crowd and is meant to be one of the more comical characters.
- La Ciguapa: is a female character who comes out at night. She is naked with very long black hair, and her feet are backwards. She enchants the men she comes across.
- Los Indios (The Indians): are a group of men and women dressed in the typical native Taino Indian attire. They travel together representing Dominican origins.

== Celebration Passion's parade ==
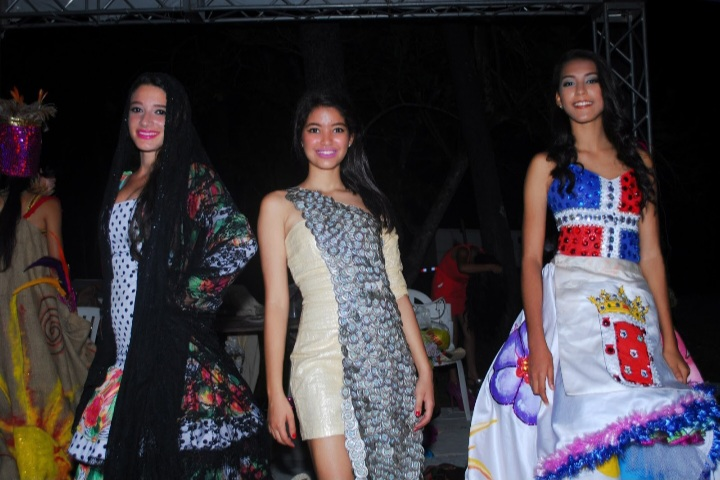
Santiago Dominican Republic women in carnival dresses.

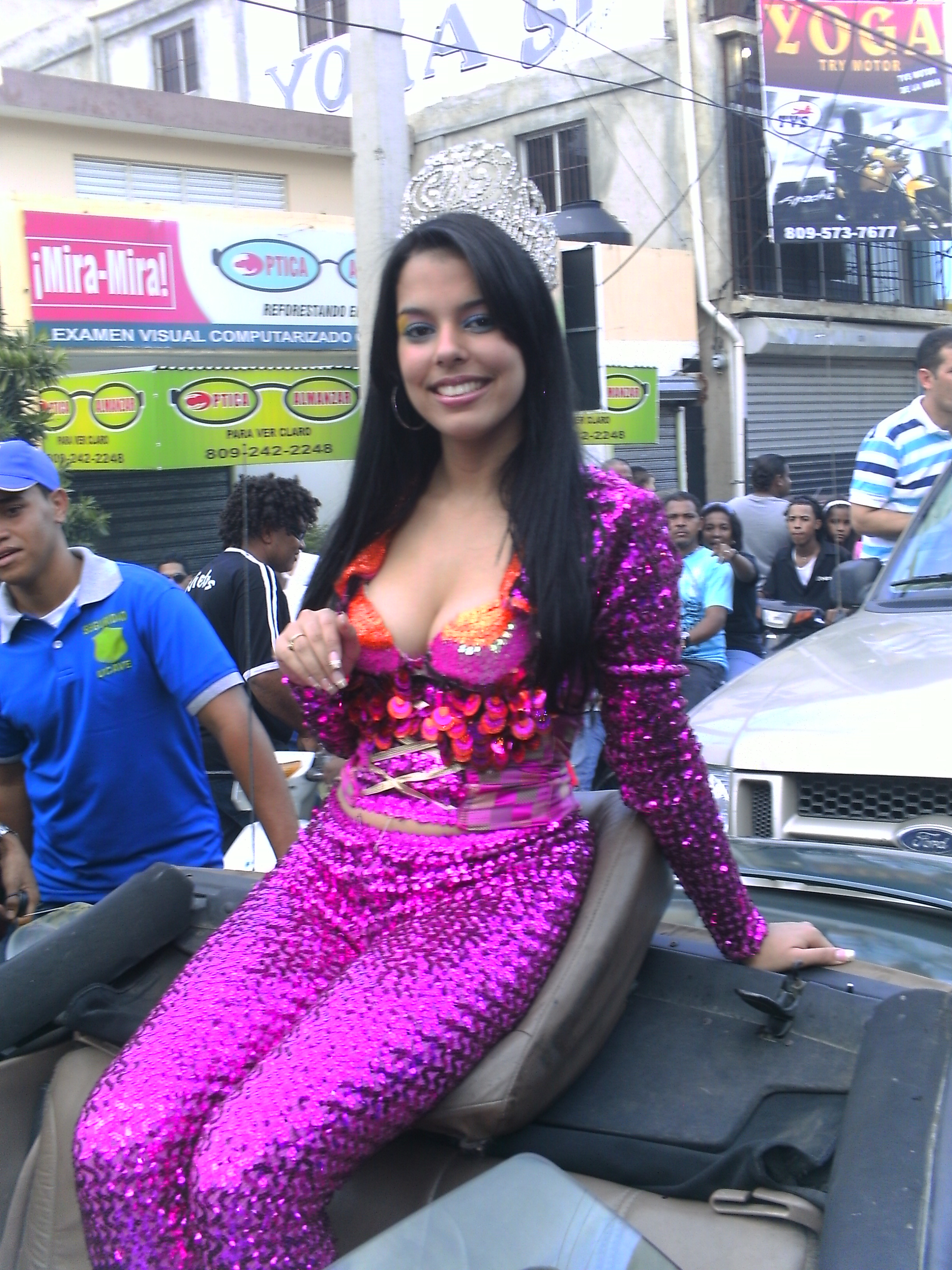
Dominican Republic carnival of La Vega

There are many ways in which the carnival is celebrated, although most celebrations have several similarities:

- They are held primarily on the main streets of the town or city.
- People gather in the streets to watch parades.
- Most of the disguised people carry a "Vejiga" or whip to hit people.
- Typical music such as merengue and bachata is played throughout the celebration to add some excitement to it.
- People wear colorful masks to represent religious figures.
