= My Girlfriend's Ghost =

El fantasma de mi novia
- Directed by: Francis Disla
- Written by: Francis Disla; Juan José Namnun; Yarissa Rodríguez; Conrado Ortiz
- Starring: Carmen Villalobos; William Levy
- Cinematography: Francis Adamez
- Edited by: Pedro Ángel López
- Music by: Jalsen Santana; David Vásquez
- Production companies: Estudio Quitasueño; Imakonos
- Distributed by: Producciones Coral
- Release date: 3 May 2018
- Country: Dominican Republic
- Language: Spanish

My Girlfriend's Ghost (Spanish: El fantasma de mi novia) is a 2018 Dominican fantasy romantic comedy film directed by Francis Disla, and stars Carmen Villalobos, and William Levy. The film premiered on May 3, 2018.

== Plot ==
The film revolves around Lupe del Mar, an impertinent and arrogant actress of Mexican telenovelas, who travels to Dominican Republic to make one of her greatest dreams come true, to record a film. She suffers a terrible accident, which leads her to be in a coma and experience fun situations.

== Cast ==
- Carmen Villalobos as Lupe del Mar
- William Levy as Chepa
- Fausto Mata as Juglar Elías Delmonte Carmelo
- Susana Dosamantes as Abuela María
- Brandon Peniche as Fernando Hurtado
- Francisca Lachapel as Deborah Pinales
- Elizabeth Gutiérrez as Elena
