= Luisito Martí =

Dominican actor (1945–2010)

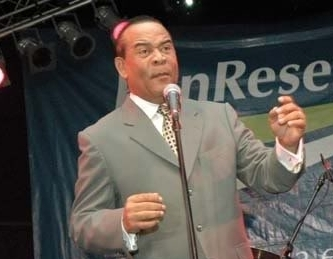
- Martí in 2007
- Born: Luis Bernardo Marte Hernández; February 1, 1945; Villa Duarte, Dominican Republic
- Died: January 3, 2010 (aged 64); Santo Domingo, Dominican Republic
- Occupations: Comedian, presenter, producer, actor, musician

Luis Bernardo Marte Hernández (born 1945–2010), better known as Luisito Martí, was a Dominican musician, comedian, actor, producer and television host.

== Career ==
He began his artistic career as a conga player in Johnny Ventura's "Combo Show", later becoming a vocalist. In the early 70s, his interpretation of the merengue song "La muerte de Martín" became widely popular in the country. Later, he followed with tracks like "Que pasa Papo", "Te digo ahorita" and "Mamá es la que sabe", among others. In 1976, as a bandleader Martí founded as "El Sonido Original", a group that reached some projection with songs like "Gato entre Macuto", "Jaleo de Acordeón" and "El mudo".

During the 1980s he became part of the legendary comedy television show El show del mediodía, where he soon became a director. Years later he produced his own television show El Show de Luisito and Anthony, with singer-songwriter Anthony Rios, which was broadcast on Channel 9 ColorVision in the early 90s. This show then aired with another proposal called De Remate in the last half the 90s.

Martí also ventured into film in 1995 starring in the film Nueba Yol, characterizing Balbuena, his iconic character. The film, had success at the box office. In 2004 he debuted another comedy show called The Luisito Martí, which aired on Antena Latina, then Telesistema 11 by 2006. In 2007 the Association of Art Critics (ACROARTE) invited him to act as host for the Casandra awards that year by TV presenter Jatnna Tavárez.

== Filmography ==
- Que Viva el Merengue y la Lambada (1989)
- Nueba Yol: ¡Por Fin Llegó Balbuena! (1995)
- Nueba Yol 3: Bajo la Nueva Ley (1997)
- De Remate (2001)
- Los Locos También Piensan (2005)

== Death ==
In May 2008 he was admitted to the Memorial Sloan Kettering Cancer Center in New York due to stomach cancer. Then in December 2009 he was transferred to the city of Tijuana to undergo stem cell treatment. On 25 December the same year he was admitted to the Diagnostic Center, Advanced Medicine and Telemedicine (CEDIMAT), where he died on January 3, 2010, at 64 years of age.

== Legacy ==
On March 3, 2023, bachata singer Romeo Santos released a music video for his song Suegra where he depicts Martí's Balbuena character in a tribute. As of May 19, 2023 the video has received 14.7 million views on YouTube.
