= Iván Gómez (mountaineer) =

Dominican mountaineer

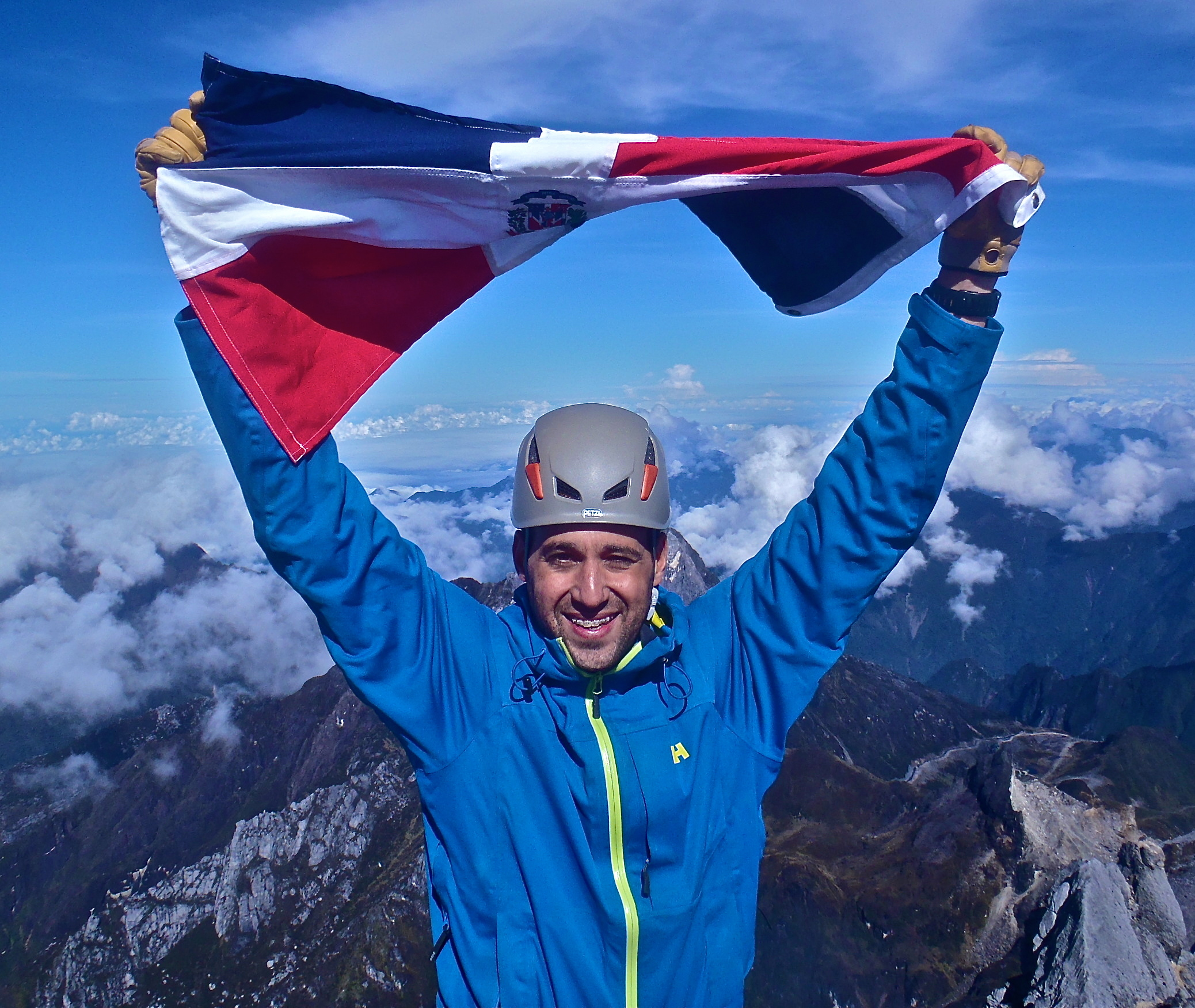
- Born: Iván Ernesto Gómez Carrasco; June 13, 1975 (age 51); Santo Domingo, Dominican Republic
- Occupation: Mountaineer

Ivan Ernesto Gómez Carrasco (born June 13, 1975 Santo Domingo, Dominican Republic) is a Dominican elite mountaineer who in 2011 became the second Dominican to reach the summit of Mount Everest.

== Biography ==
He is the son of Cesar Augusto Gomez and Luz Mercedes Gomez Carrasco, the eldest of three brothers. He completed his primary education at St. Theresa school and high school in Loyola College. At age 13 he joined the Loyola Center Rookie discovering his passion for the mountains.

He completed his university studies in Business Administration at INTEC and later a Masters in Business. He currently chairs the group "Desde El Medio", and is a founding Partner of VERTEX. He is also a motivational lecturer and runs a foundation for the benefit of national parks and nature reserves in the Dominican Republic.

== Mountaineering ==
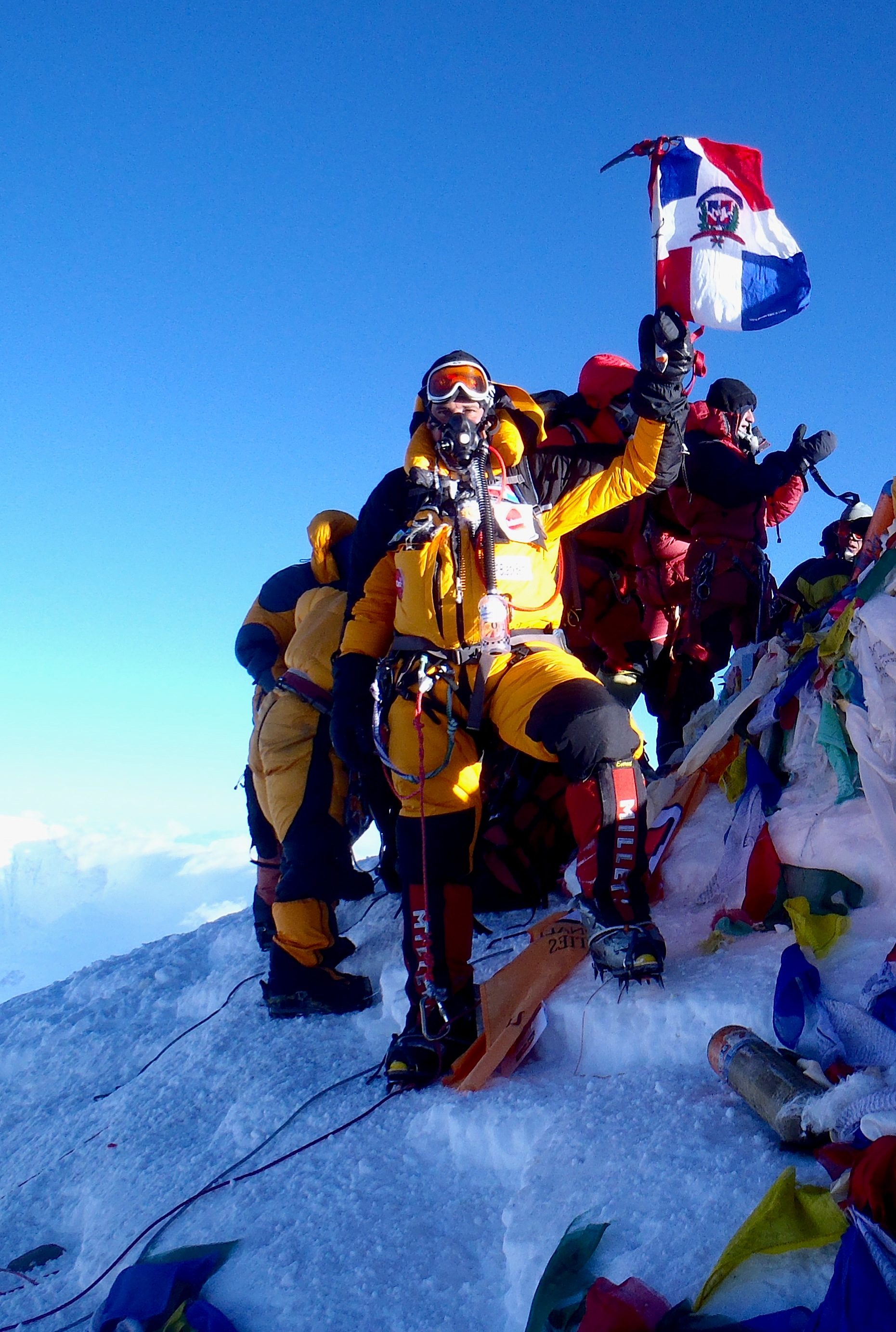
Ivan Gomez at the summit of Mount Everest.

In 2005 he became one of the first Dominicans to summit the highest mountain in the African continent, Kilimanjaro, alongside Federico Jovine, Luis Manuel Gonzales, Ruben Torres, Luis Franco Karim Mella. After a few days of rest and without the participation of Luis Franco due to injury, he begins to climb Mount Kenya, which is considered a much more technical challenging mountain to climb, and which also required making a bivouac at 5000 meters for a day to reach the summit.

Later in 2006 with the trust and support of his sponsors, he undertakes another challenge alongside Federico Jovine, Ruben Torres and Karim Mella. This is called the " Crowning America" project. Dominicans crown the summit of the highest mountain in the Americas, Aconcagua 6,962 m. There they had to deal with inclement weather in this treacherous mountain and assist a young Spanish mountaineer that the decline began to suffer the effects of altitude sickness. In this expedition they were accompanied by one of his mentors Father Chuco CEL and spiritual guide, who also attempted to climb the mountain but was unsuccessful.

In August 2007 an intense and exhausting search for sponsors, starts with Ruben Torres, Federico Jovine and Luis Manuel Gonzales the " Crowning Europe " project and then to deal with setbacks and complications trip communication with the Russians manage to make summit first time in the highest mountain of mainland Europe, Mount Elbrus 5,640 m.

After a pause, undertaken in 2011 by Federico Jovine and Karim Mella the " EXCELSIOR " 1st draft.. Dominican to the top of Mount Everest 8,848 m which required a year of preparation and two months of issue to achieve the summit on May 21, 2011 at 5:28 by Karim Mella became the first Dominican in placing the Flag Expedition Dominican on top of the world. Federico Jovine was forced to abandon the climb just 400 m from the top.

== Other expeditions ==
Similarly he has participated in numerous local and international expeditions, being able to highlight the Ecochallenge 2000 Sabah Borneo jungle, where he and Luis Manuel Gonzales, Lorelei Viego Sainz and Alfonzo became the 1.er. Team Dominican and Caribbean Ecochallenge participate and complete a race 500 km adventure through the jungle using non- motorized means. In 2001, after competing with a group of Latin American adventurers was selected as a member of the Dominican team to participate in the Marlboro Adventure Team (Desert UTAH, USA) with Roger Jover, Lorelei Quirico Sainz and Abreu. Throughout his career has practiced various disciplines excelling in Wind Surf in which he won the National Championship in the categories of Formula and Slalom in 2002.

In December 2003 integrates with Luis Manuel Gonzales and Federico Jovine the project " 10 by 10 ", which managed to implement the record in a continuous, non-stop journey to climb the ten highest mountains of the Dominican Republic at a time record of 10 days and it was there that was where they began to dream of the high peaks initiating the spark that materialized two years later.

Then in 2006, teams up with Humberto Ruiz, Luis Manuel Gonzales and Karim Mella to participate and complete the Florida Coast to Coast. Adventure Race 3 days straight, in which the Florida Coast to Coast using mountain biking, paddling and walking kayaks is crossed. This also included the Young Roger and Joan Febles Dominicans as a support team. Also in 2008 he won the National Enduro Subcampeonato.

== Military career ==
In 2003 he entered as a Precision Marksman Pistol Shooter in the team of the Dominican Army. In 2006 he won the Gold Medal as the best shooter Shooting Accuracy 9 mm pistol. Thereafter, as a team member he achieved gold medals consecutively until 2011, when he becomes part of the team which serves Rifle as in work of teaching for cadets in both disciplines. Gomez also holds the rank of captain in the Army of the Dominican Republic.

The Everest expedition he was entrusted during the mission to also carry the flag of the Dominican Army, which was delivered by the then Vice President of the Dominican Republic Rafael Alburquerque.
