= La Silla Awards =

La Silla Awards (premios La Silla) are the awards granted by the Asociación Dominicana de Profesionales de la Industria del Cine (ADOCINE).

The name of the awards is after the first Dominican film of the same name in 1963 made by Franklin Domínguez .

== Awards categories ==
- Best Short Film
- Best Documentary Feature
- Best Visual Effects
- Best Makeup
- Best Costume Design
- Arte
- Best Screenplay
- Best Musicalization
- Best Cinematography
- Best Sound
- Best Edition
- Best Song
- Best Actress in a Supporting Role
- Best Actor in a Supporting Role
- Best Actress in a Leading Role
- Best Actor in a Leading Role
- La Silla Award for Best Productor
- Best Director
- Best Comedy Picture
- Best Picture

== 1st Premiation ==
The first premiation were held on 17 November 2013 at the National Theatre (Teatro Nacional) in Santo Domingo as part of the VII Festival de Cine Global (Global Cinema Festival) of Funglode.

"Cuando asumimos las riendas de ADOCINE prometimos, entre otras cosas que haríamos un premio para el cine dominicano. Hoy es una realidad, y estamos muy agradecidos de la colaboración que recibimos del presidente de la Fundación Global, el doctor Leonel Fernández, quien posibilitó que hiciéramos la gala dentro del Festival de Cine Global", said Alfonso Rodríguez, Association president.

During the gala were award for they help to the local cinema: Franklin Domínguez, Ricardo Thorman, Ellis Pérez and Victoria Kluge (posthumous).

In this first awards, 18 movies fought in the different categories.

The award for best film is traditionally carried from the first delivery in the final part of the event, by the lawyer of the Dominican Association of Professionals of the Film Industry, the lawyer Cirilo J. Guzmán in a briefcase, who with his legal signature review & notarize the votes, reviewing this & all other legality winning categories.
