= Roberto Salcedo Jr. =

Dominican comedian, actor and writer (born 1979)

Roberto Salcedo
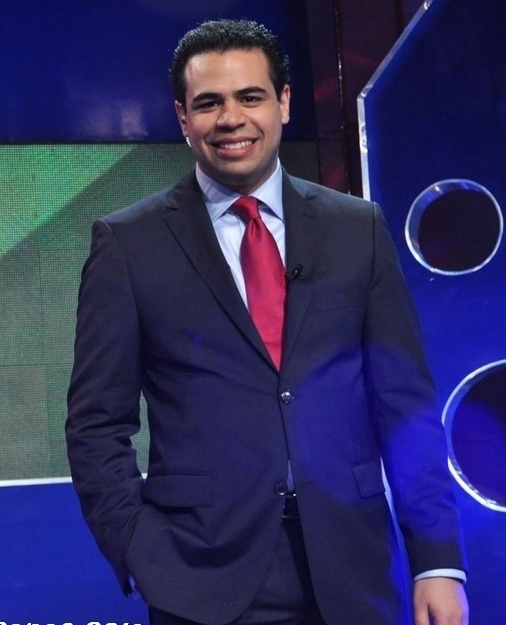

Personal details
- Born: Roberto Ángel Salcedo Sanz; September 22, 1979 (age 47) Santo Domingo, Dominican Republic
- Spouse: Johanna Peña Dumé
- Parents: Roberto Salcedo Sr. (father); Angélica Sanz (mother)

Roberto Ángel Salcedo Sanz (born September 22, 1979), better known by his stage name Robertico Salcedo or simply Roberto Salcedo, is a Dominican comedian, actor, screenwriter, producer and writer.

== Biography ==
From an early age he has been in front of cameras, since he was 5 years old he started to appear in comedy shows along with his father Roberto Salcedo Sr.

In addition to conducting and production of this weekly program, Salcedo has assumed other projects such as plays and low budget movies which have had great financial success but have been severely panned by critics.

He has also worked with Fausto Mata in movies like Megadiva, I Love Bachata and Profe por accidente, among others.

== Filmography ==
Year	Title	Credited as				Character	Notes
Year	Title	Producer	Director	Writer	Actor	Character	Notes
2006	Un macho de mujer	Yes	No	No	Yes	Ramón	Executive producer
2007	Mi novia está de madre	Yes	No	Yes	Yes	Felipe	Executive producer
2009	Megadiva	Yes	Yes	Yes	Yes	Andrés	Executive producer
2011	I Love Bachata	Yes	Yes	Yes	Yes	Marcos	—N/a
2013	Profe por accidente	No	Yes	No	Yes	Francisco	—N/a
2014	Vamos de Robo	No	Yes	Yes	No	—N/a	—N/a
2015	Pa'l Campamento	No	Yes	Yes	Yes	Pedro José	—N/a
2015	Todo Incluido	Yes	Yes	Yes	No	—N/a	Executive producer
2016	Mi Suegra y Yo	No	Yes	Yes	Yes	Ernesto	—N/a
2016	¿Pa' Qué Me Casé?	No	Yes	Yes	No	—N/a	—N/a
2017	El Plan Perfecto	No	Yes	Yes	Yes	Ricky	—N/a
2017	Súper Papá	No	Yes	Yes	Yes	Juan Antonio	—N/a
2017	Pasao de Libras	No	Yes	Yes	No	—N/a	—N/a
2018	Pobres Millonarios	No	Yes	Yes	Yes	Julio César	—N/a
2018	Jugando a Bailar	No	Yes	Yes	No	—N/a	—N/a
2019	Casi Fiel	No	Yes	Yes	No	—N/a	—N/a
2019	Súper Papá 2	No	Yes	Yes	Yes	Juan Antonio	—N/a
2019	La Roba Corazones	No	Yes	Yes	No	—N/a	—N/a
TBA	Coma Profundo	No	Yes	Yes	No	—N/a	—N/a
