= Alfonso Rodríguez (director) =

Director and media personality

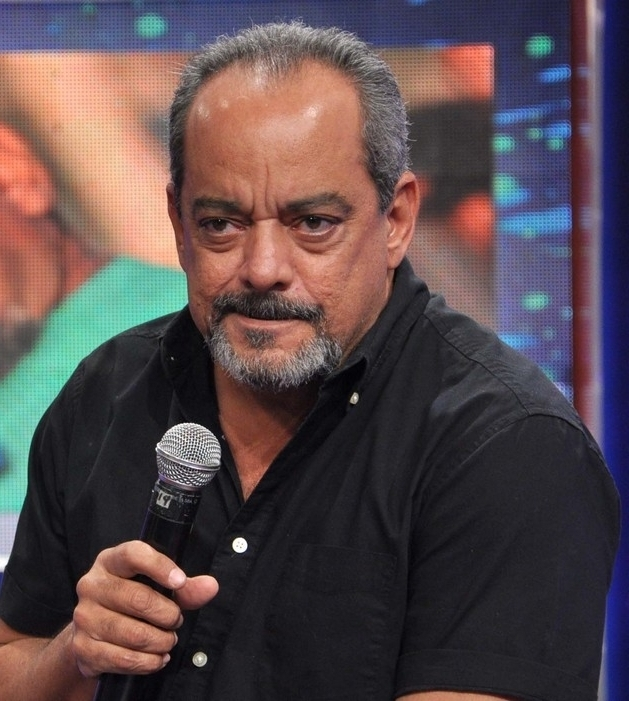
- Born: 5 January 1956 (age 70); Ciudad Trujillo (Santo Domingo), Dominican Republic
- Education: UASD
- Occupations: Director, Producer, Writer, Actor
- Years active: 1987–present
- Notable work: Yuniol 2 Trópico; Playball; Al fin y al cabo La Soga; Lotoman; Pimp Bullies; Feo de día, lindo de noche
- Spouse(s): Elizabeth Ruiz (????-2012); Victoria Fernández (2012 or 2013–present)
- Children: Amín Rodríguez, kiali Rodriguez y carmen Rodriguez

Alfonso Rodríguez (born 5 January 1956, in Ciudad Trujillo, Dominican Republic) is a Dominican director, producer, writer, actor and former presidential candidate for the 2020 elections in the Dominican Republic.

== Biography ==
Graduated from the Universidad Autonoma de Santo Domingo (UASD) and in 1979 he studied TV and films production in the University of California, Irvine. His first works where as a Head Colorist in Color System Tech where he colored classic B/W movies such as Miracle on 34th Street, The Maltese Falcon, and Alfred Hitchcock Presents, among others. He returned to Dominican Republic and started to work as a director of production in several prestigious TV stations where he started to make TV movies, sitcoms and soap operas.

In 1988 Rodríguez makes his first feature film "Trafico de Niños", and then the hit soap opera Cadena Braga. Along with his popular sitcoms (Ciudad Nueva, Electrolocos y Pobre Presidente), he makes "Grandes Series Dominicanas", 10 Mini Series of 5 one-hour episodes. In 2003 and 2004 he makes the TV Movies "Jarabe de Mar" I, II and III and in 2006 the hit romantic comedy "Un Macho de Mujer". His latest work, "Yuniol" is his most beloved work, and got excellent reviews from national and international critics.

== Filmography ==
- En altamar (2018)
- Pulso (2018)
- Luis (2017)
- El encuentro (2017)
- Ladrones (2015)
- Morir soñando (2015)
- Locas y atrapadas (2014)
- Ponchao (2013)
- Noche de circo (2013)
- Mi angelito favorito (2013)
- Lotoman 2.0 (2012)
- Feo de día, lindo de noche (2012)
- Pimp Bullies (2011)
- Lotoman (2011)
- Jaque mate (2011)
- La soga (2009)
- Al fin y al cabo (2008)
- Playball (2008)
- Trópico (2007)
- Yuniol 2 (2007)
- Un macho de mujer (2006)
- La fiesta del Chivo (2005)
- Cadena Braga (1991)
- Tráfico de niños (1988)

== Presidential aspirations ==
Rodríguez formally announced his aspirations for the country's 2020 presidential election. In the company of his three daughters, Rodriguez explained that his aspiration was not a leap into the void or something that came to him overnight.

Rodríguez clarified that his presidential candidacy project has nothing to do with any movement of the left. When asked about who would accompany him on his political platform, he said that many people have already called him to offer his support, but that little by little he will announce the names of those who will join him.

Rodríguez announced that there is a medium size political party and two small parties that were interested in his project of Democratic Revolution 2020, but that he would only accept as long as in that party, primary votes are held first and then the candidate who wins will run.

To keep accounts clear from the first day, Rodríguez made public his declaration of assets of 191 million Dominican pesos. The actor also said that he would not leave aside his role as producer and film director, because he maintained that he is not going to live off politics.
