= List of Dominican submissions for the Academy Award for Best International Feature Film =

List of Dominican films

Best International Feature Film submissions from the Dominican Republic

Highlights
- Debut: 1983
- Submissions: 19
- Nominations: none
- Oscar winners: none

The Dominican Republic has submitted films for the Academy Award for Best International Feature Film since 1983. (Note: The category was previously named the Academy Award for Best Foreign Language Film, but this was changed to the Academy Award for Best International Feature Film in April 2019, after the Academy deemed the word "Foreign" to be outdated.) The award is handed out annually by the United States Academy of Motion Picture Arts and Sciences to a feature-length motion picture produced outside the United States that contains primarily non-English dialogue.

As of 2026, the Dominican Republic has submitted nineteen films, but none of them were nominated.

== Submissions ==
Every year, each country is invited by the Academy of Motion Picture Arts and Sciences to submit its best film for the Academy Award for Best International Feature Film since 1956. The International Feature Film Committee oversees the process and reviews all the submitted films. Following this, they vote via secret ballot to determine the five nominees for the award.

All films were produced primary in Spanish. Below is a list of the films submitted by the Dominican Republic in the Best Foreign Language Film category at the Academy Awards.

Year (Ceremony)	Film title used in nomination	Original title	Language(s)	Director(s)	Result
1983 (56th)	Guaguasi		Spanish	Jorge Ulla	Not nominated
1988 (61st)	One Way Ticket	Un pasaje de Ida	Spanish	Agliberto Meléndez	Not nominated
1995 (68th)	Nueba Yol	Nueba Yol: Por fin llegó Balbuena	Spanish, Fula, English	Ángel Muñiz	Not nominated
2011 (84th)	Love Child	La hija natural	Spanish	Leticia Tonos	Not nominated
2012 (85th)	Jaque Mate		Spanish	José María Cabral	Not nominated
2013 (86th)	Who's the Boss?	¿Quién Manda?	Spanish	Ronni Castillo	Not nominated
2014 (87th)	Cristo Rey		Spanish	Leticia Tonos	Not nominated
2015 (88th)	Sand Dollars	Dólares de Arena	Spanish, French, English	Laura Amelia Guzmán, Israel Cárdenas	Not nominated
2016 (89th)	Sugar Fields	Flor de Azúcar	Spanish	Fernando Baez Mella	Not nominated
2017 (90th)	Woodpeckers	Carpinteros	Spanish	José María Cabral	Not nominated
2018 (91st)	Cocote		Spanish	Nelson Carlo de Los Santos Arias	Not nominated
2019 (92nd)	The Projectionist	El proyeccionista	Spanish	José María Cabral	Not nominated
2020 (93rd)	A State of Madness	Mis 500 Locos	Spanish	Leticia Tonos	Not nominated
2021 (94th)	Holy Beasts	La Fiera y la Fiesta	Spanish	Laura Amelia Guzmán and Israel Cárdenas	Not nominated
2022 (95th)	Bantú Mama		Spanish, French	Ivan Herrera	Not nominated
2023 (96th)	Cuarencena		Spanish	David Maler	Not nominated
2024 (97th)	Aire: Just Breathe	Aire	Spanish	Leticia Tonos	Not nominated
2025 (98th)	Pepe		Spanish, Afrikaans, Mbukushu, German	Nelson Carlo De Los Santos Arias	Not nominated
2026 (99th)	Melodrama		Spanish, French, Haitian	Andrés Farías	Pending

== Shortlisted films ==
Since 2021, the Dominican Republic announced a list of finalists or eligible films that varies in number over the years (from 2 to 7 films) before announcing its official Oscar nominee The following films have been shortlisted by the Academy of Motion Picture Arts and Sciences of the Dominican Republic:

Year	Films
2021	Cabarete · Candela · Hotel Coppelia · Liborio · Papi
2022	Carajita
2023	Babygirl · Croma Kid
2024	Boca Chica · Captain Avispa · The Fisherman's Daughter · The Method · Pérez Rodríguez · The Tenderness
2025	Bionico's Bachata · Golden Dreams · Olivia & the Clouds · The Silence of Marcos Tremmer · Sugar Island · El Tiburón
