= Colao =

Colao is a surname. Notable people with the surname include:

- Emma Colao (born 1995), Spanish jurist, politician, and activist
- Vittorio Colao (born 1961), Italian businessman

== Other uses ==
- Colao (film), a 2017 Dominican romantic comedy film by Frank Perozo
