= Nashla (given name) =

Nashla is a feminine given name of uncertain origins, primarily used among Spanish speakers in North America. It was among the most popular names for newborn girls in the Dominican Republic in 2021, perhaps influenced by Dominican actress Nashla Bogaert, who was a judge on the Color Visión network television talent show Dominicana's Got Talent which aired from 2019 to 2021. The name is also in use in the United States, particularly in New York and New Jersey, states which have a number of residents of Dominican descent.

== Women ==
- Nashla Aguilar (born 1994), Mexican actress
- Nashla Bogaert (born 1986), Dominican actress
