= Fiallo =

Fiallo is a surname. Notable people with the surname include:

- Cyrina Fiallo, American actress
- Delia Fiallo (1924–2021), Cuban author and screenwriter
- Fabio Fiallo (1866–1942), Dominican writer, poet and politician
- Gregorio Fiallo (born 1952), Cuban swimmer
- Larimar Fiallo (born 1983), Dominican beauty pageant titleholder
- Viriato Fiallo (1895-1983), Dominican doctor and politician
