= List of submissions to the 61st Academy Awards for Best Foreign Language Film =

1988 Best Foreign Language Film submissions

Highlights
- Oscar winner: (Denmark) Pelle the Conqueror
- Submissions: 31
- Debuts: none

This is a list of submissions to the 61st Academy Awards for Best Foreign Language Film. The Academy Award for Best Foreign Language Film was created in 1956 by the Academy of Motion Picture Arts and Sciences to honour non-English-speaking films produced outside the United States. The award is handed out annually, and is accepted by the winning film's director, although it is considered an award for the submitting country as a whole. Countries are invited by the Academy to submit their best films for competition according to strict rules, with only one film being accepted from each country.

For the 61st Academy Awards, thirty-one films were submitted in the category Academy Award for Best Foreign Language Film. The Soviet film, Commissar, was filmed in 1967, but was banned for twenty years. The five nominated films came from Belgium, Hungary, India, Spain and Denmark.

Denmark won the award for the second time in a row with Pelle the Conqueror by Bille August, which was also nominated for Best Actor (Max von Sydow).

== Submissions ==
Submitting country	Film title used in nomination	Original title	Language(s)	Director(s)	Result
Argentina	The Debt	La deuda interna	Spanish	Miguel Pereira	Not nominated
Austria	Undiscovered Country	Das Weite Land	German	Luc Bondy	Not nominated
Belgium	The Music Teacher	Le Maître de musique	French	Gérard Corbiau	Nominated
Brazil	The Story of Fausta	Romance da Empregada	Brazilian Portuguese	Bruno Barreto	Not nominated
Bulgaria	Where Do We Go?	За къде пътувате?	Bulgarian	Rangel Vulchanov	Not nominated
Canada	The Revolving Doors	Les portes tournantes	French	Francis Mankiewicz	Not nominated
China	Red Sorghum	红高粱	Mandarin	Zhang Yimou	Not nominated
Cuba	Letters from the Park	Cartas del parque	Spanish	Tomás Gutiérrez Alea	Not nominated
Denmark	Pelle the Conqueror	Pelle erobreren	Scanian, Danish, Swedish	Bille August	Won Academy Award
Dominican Republic	One Way Ticket	Un Pasaje de Ida	Spanish	Agliberto Meléndez	Not nominated
France	The Reader	La Lectrice	French	Michel Deville	Not nominated
West Germany	Yasemin		German	Hark Bohm	Not nominated
Greece	In the Shadow of Fear	Στη σκιά του τρόμου	Greek	Giorgos Karypidis	Not nominated
Hungary	Hanussen		Hungarian, German	István Szabó	Nominated
Iceland	In the Shadow of the Raven	Í skugga hrafnsins	Icelandic, German	Hrafn Gunnlaugsson	Not nominated
India	Salaam Bombay!	सलाम बॉम्बे	Hindi	Mira Nair	Nominated
Israel	The Summer of Aviya	הקיץ של אביה	Hebrew, Yiddish	Eli Cohen	Not nominated
Italy	The Legend of the Holy Drinker	La Leggenda del santo bevitore	Italian	Ermanno Olmi	Not nominated
Japan	Hope and Pain	ダウンタウン・ヒーローズ	Japanese	Yoji Yamada	Not nominated
Mexico	The Last Tunnel	El último túnel	Spanish, Rarámuri	Servando González	Not nominated
Netherlands	The Vanishing	Spoorloos	Dutch, French, English	George Sluizer	Disqualified
Nicaragua	The Ghost of War	El espectro de la guerra	Spanish	Ramiro Lacayo-Deshon	Not nominated
Norway	The Ice Palace	Is-slottet	Norwegian	Per Blom	Not nominated
Peru	The Mouth of the Wolf	La boca del lobo	Spanish	Francisco José Lombardi	Not nominated
Poland	A Short Film About Love	Krótki film o milosci	Polish	Krzysztof Kieślowski	Not nominated
Portugal	Hard Times	Tempos Difíceis	Portuguese	João Botelho	Not nominated
Puerto Rico	Tango Bar		Spanish	Marcos Zurinaga	Not nominated
Soviet Union	Commissar	Комиссар	Russian	Aleksandr Askoldov	Not nominated
Spain	Women on the Verge of a Nervous Breakdown	Mujeres al borde de un ataque de nervios	Spanish	Pedro Almodóvar	Nominated
Switzerland	La Méridienne		French	Jean-François Amiguet	Not nominated
Taiwan	My Mother's Teahouse	春秋茶室	Mandarin	Chen Kunhou	Not nominated
Yugoslavia	My Uncle's Legacy	Život sa stricem	Serbo-Croatian	Krsto Papić	Not nominated

== Notes ==
- The Dutch submission, the thriller The Vanishing, was disqualified by the Oscar committee. AMPAS complained that less than 50% of the dialogue in the film was in Dutch, and that French was the majority language. Although the film was made by the Netherlands with a French-Dutch filmmaker and a mixed cast (mostly Dutch), AMPAS deemed that the film was not suitable to represent the Netherlands. The Netherlands declined to send another film, leaving them unrepresented for the first time since 1972.
