= Sharktopus vs. Pteracuda =

2014 American television film

- TV poster
- Written by: Matt Yamashita
- Directed by: Kevin O'Neill
- Starring: Robert Carradine; Katie Savoy; Rib Hillis; Conan O'Brien
- Music by: Cynthia Brown
- Country of origin: United States
- Original language: English

Production
- Producers: Roger Corman; Julie Corman
- Cinematography: Hernan Herrera
- Editor: Vikram Kale
- Running time: 84 min

Original release
- Network: Syfy
- Release: August 2, 2014

Related
- Sharktopus; Sharktopus vs. Whalewolf

Sharktopus vs. Pteracuda is the sequel to the 2010 SyFy original monster film Sharktopus and premiered on August 2, 2014. The film was produced by Roger Corman, who directed the Conan O'Brien cameo, and stars Robert Carradine, Katie Savoy, and Rib Hillis. O'Brien makes his acting debut in a scene described as "truly violent, patently disgusting and darkly humorous". It is the second film in the Sharktopus franchise.

== Plot ==
Sometime after the events of the first film, marine biologist Lorena Christmas (Katie Savoy) discovers an egg sac containing a baby Sharktopus in the ocean, left behind by the destruction of the original Sharktopus.

Sometime later, Dr. Rico Symes (Robert Carradine), CEO of Symodyne (the company that originally created Sharktopus), releases a barracuda-pterodactyl hybrid creature known as Pteracuda, intended for military use, above the desert against the advice of head of security Hamilton (Rib Hillis). The Pteracuda, controlled with a computer chip in its brain, is secretly hacked by a scientist at Symodyne named Vladimir Futon to terrorize populated areas. The Pteracuda is directed towards the Symodyne lab, and kills a worker before Hamilton scares it off. Futon flees the scene and continues to control the Pteracuda from his car.

Hamilton and his team of military commandos engage in battle with the Pteracuda in a helicopter. Symes discovers that Pteracuda's computer chip has been hacked, and reports this information to Hamilton. The Pteracuda then causes the helicopter to crash in the ocean, killing everybody except Hamilton. Futon – while driving his car – loses the Pteracuda's signal after spilling a beverage on his computer keyboard and then crashing his car, leaving Pteracuda on his own command.

Meanwhile, Lorena is working at a water park/aquarium owned by her uncle, greedy business mogul Munoz, and is currently training the now fully grown Sharktopus. After two customers threaten to give Munoz a one star review, he shows them the Sharktopus only for the couple to almost get killed by the creature. The Sharktopus makes news headlines as Symes realizes that the original Sharktopus did reproduce.

Symes and Hamilton force Munoz to give Sharktopus to them so they can use it to kill Pteracuda, much to Lorena's anger. Symes and Hamilton proceed to release Sharktopus into the ocean so it can fight Pteracuda. Sharktopus and Pteracuda kill a few shipwreck divers before they begin to fight.

Meanwhile, Munoz locks Lorena in a closet to keep her quiet. She manages to break out and calls her lifeguard boyfriend, Rick Hoffman, telling him to evacuate the beach. However, the Sharktopus and Pteracuda arrive and kill a few people, including Conan O'Brien.

In the meantime, Symes and Hamilton discover that Futon hacked into Pteracuda's system. At a nearby hotel, Futon regains control of Pteracuda. The Pteracuda crashes a plane and kills everybody onboard, including the couple that Munoz showed the Sharktopus to earlier.

Having been paid a huge amount of money by Symes to keep quiet about Sharktopus, Munoz closes the park for good. The Sharktopus and Pteracuda kill several more people at the beach before continuing their fight.

Symes and Hamilton kidnap a walking Lorena to force her to help them kill the creatures. Lorena realizes that she read one of Symes' papers back in college. Lorena then escapes Symes while he's distracted by seeing Rick pull in an injured woman on the beach. Pteracuda attacks more people on the beach, and Rick goes on a jetski to warn people. Symes catches up to Lorena where they witness Rick being killed by the Pteracuda. The two of them and Hamilton trace Sharktopus' location to a series of canals near the aquarium.

Symes discovers that Futon is attempting to cause a meltdown at a nearby nuclear power plant using Pteracuda. He, Lorena, and Hamilton then attempt to drive to the hotel to stop Futon. At the aquarium, Sharktopus arrives and kills several people, including Munoz. Lorena, Symes, and Hamilton arrive at the hotel and take Futon captive. They find out he's working for a foreign terrorist group. It is revealed on a news report that only Symes is wanted by the government for questioning. Futon takes control of Symes' gun and leaves with his computer. He is shot by Hamilton during his escape, and the group leaves him to be eaten by Pteracuda while Symes stops the Pteracuda's coded course to the power plant.

When the group attempts to drive away, they are attacked by Pteracuda. Symes forces Lorena and Hamilton out of the car with the computer, leaving them for dead. Lorena and Hamilton manage to evade Pteracuda, as it and the Sharktopus begin to fight again. Hamilton then drives off in another car with the computer, intending to kill the creatures himself, and Lorena returns home.

The next day, Hamilton confronts Symes at a restaurant, holding him at gunpoint and forcing him onto a rowboat with the computer. Symes is ripped in half by Sharktopus and Pteracuda while Hamilton returns to help Lorena.

Lorena realizes that the Pteracuda must eat constantly in order to survive, and she and Hamilton create a plan to kill both creatures. Using a disco ball, they lure in Pteracuda. Sharktopus arrives subsequently and the two creatures begin to fight once more. Hamilton shoots the Pteracuda with a harpoon that breaches its computer chip causing it to overload and explode, ostensibly killing both creatures. As Lorena and Hamilton leave, the Sharktopus grabs onto their boat, and lunges at the camera as the film abruptly ends.

== Cast ==
- Robert Carradine as Dr. Rico Symes
- Rib Hillis as Hamilton "Hamm"
- Katie Savoy as Lorena Christmas
- Conan O'Brien as Himself
- Akari Endo as Veronica Vegas
- Hensy Pichardo as Munoz
- Tony Evangelista as Rick Hoffman
- Hector Then as Harold "Harry" Smith

== Sequel ==
The film was followed by a third film called Sharktopus vs. Whalewolf, which aired on July 19, 2015 on Syfy.

== Home media ==
No U.S. DVDs of this film have been made, but there are some DVDs made in Regions 2, 3 and 4 which are available online.
