= Frank Perozo =

Actor from the Dominican Republic

Francisco Ernesto Perozo
- Occupation: Actor
- Years active: 2000 – present
- Height: 1.87 m (6 ft 1 1/2 in)
- Spouse: Dominique Colussi (m. 2015)
- Partner(s): Nashla Bogaert (2007–2008); Denise Quiñones (2010–2011)
- Children: Marco Perozo
- Awards: Soberano Award for best leading actor (2013–14)
- Frank Perozo on X
- Frank Perozo on Instagram
- Biography for Frank Perozo at IMDb

Francisco Ernesto Perozo is a Dominican actor, assistant director and producer. and also he had a relationship with Denise Quiñones Miss Universe 2001 from Puerto Rico.

== Filmography ==
Year	Title	Character	Director	Country
2000	Paraíso (TV series)	cameo	—N/a	Spain
2003	Dreaming of Julia	cameo	Juan Gerard	Dominican Republic, Germany, U.S.
2004	Quarter to Ten	Max	Albert Xavier	Dominican Republic
2004	Negocios son Negocios	El Recomendado	Jorge de Bernardi	Dominican Republic
2005	The Lost City	cameo	Andy García	U.S.
2005	La Fiesta del Chivo	René	Luis Llosa	Dominican Republic, Spain, UK
2005	La Maldición del Padre Cardona	Raciel	Félix Germán	Dominican Republic
2006	Un Macho de Mujer	cameo	Alfonso Rodríguez	Dominican Republic
2006	Viajeros	Juan	Carlos Bidó	Dominican Republic
2006	Espejismo	Junior	Víctor Ramírez	Dominican Republic
2006	Someone Else	Alex	Col Spector	UK
2006	La Tragedia Llenas: Un Código 666	Irving Restrepo	Elías Acosta	Dominican Republic
2007	Operación Patakón	J. R.	Tito Nekerman	Dominican Republic
2007	Yuniol	Junior	Alfonso Rodríguez	Dominican Republic
2007	Mi Novia Está... de Madre!	Andy	Archie López	Dominican Republic
2007	Del Fondo de la Noche	Teniente Amado García	Javier Balaguer	Dominican Republic
2009	Miente	Diff	Rafi Mercado	Puerto Rico, Dominican Republic
2009	3 al rescate	Larry / Juanchi (voice)	Jorge Morillo, Luis Morillo	Dominican Republic
2010	Elite	Yuri	Andrés Ramírez	Puerto Rico
2010, 2013	Affaires étrangères (TV Series)	Antonio Gabaldi; Edouardo Calavina	—N/a	France
2011	America	Darío	Sonia Fritz	Puerto Rico
2011	La Hija Natural	Rubí	Leticia Tonos	Dominican Republic, Puerto Rico
2011	Jaque Mate	Andrés G.	José María Cabral	Dominican Republic
2012	Feo de Día, Lindo de Noche	Lorenzo (lindo)	Alfonso Rodríguez	Dominican Republic
2013	¿Quién Manda?	Alex	Ronni Castillo	Dominican Republic
2013	Cristo Rey	Profesor García	Leticia Tonos	Dominican Republic
2013	A Tiro Limpio (short)	Frank	Jean Gabriel Guerra	Dominican Republic
2013	Despertar	Pascual	José María Cabral	Dominican Republic
2014	La Extraña	Jean Louis	César Rodríguez	Dominican Republic
2014	Al Sur de la Inocencia	Santiago	Héctor Valdez	Dominican Republic
2014	On Painted Wings	Tato	C. Mark DeGaetani	Dominican Republic, U.S.
2015	Expedición Gloriosa (announced)	Poncio Pou	Roddy Pérez	Dominican Republic
2015	Ladrones	Rex	Joe Menendez	Mexico
2016	All Men Are the Same	Manolo	Manuel Gómez Pereira	Dominican Republic
2017	Colao		Himself	Dominican Republic
2018	Trabajo sucio	Benito	David Pagan Mariñez	Dominican Republic
2021	No es lo que parece	Juan 'Juanma' Manuel	David Maler	Dominican Republic
2023	Cuarencena	El Chompi	David Maler	Dominican Republic
2023	The Year of the Tiger		Yasser Michelén	Dominican Republic, Peru
