= All Men Are the Same =

All Men Are the Same may refer to:

- All Men Are the Same (1994 film), a Spanish comedy film
  - All Men Are the Same (2016 film), a Dominican Republic comedy film, a remake of the above
