= Jaque Mate (film) =

2012 film

- Theatrical release poster
- Directed by: José María Cabral
- Written by: César León López; José María Cabral
- Starring: Adrián Mas; Frank Perozo; Marcos Bonetti; Michelle Vargas
- Cinematography: Hernan Herrera
- Release date: 12 April 2012
- Running time: 81 minutes
- Country: Dominican Republic
- Language: Spanish

Jaque Mate is a 2012 Dominican thriller drama film directed and written by José María Cabral. The film was selected as the Dominican entry for the Best Foreign Language Oscar at the 85th Academy Awards.

== Cast ==
- Adrián Mas as David Hernandez
- Frank Perozo as Andres G. / Kidnapper
- Marcos Bonetti as Daniel
- Michelle Vargas as Alejandra H.
- Sharlene Taulé as Maggie
- Alfonso Rodríguez as Inspector Peralta
- Evelina Rodriguez as Agente Diaz
- Olga Bucarelli as Manuela
- Sergio Carlo as Fernando
- Luis Nova as Stage Manager
- David Ortiz as himself
- Johnie Mercedes as Police #1
- Luis Manuel Aguilo as Francisco Rosa

== Plot ==
David Hernandez is the well-known host of a popular fictional game show, “Jaque Mate” (Checkmate). The show has a segment in which he answers calls from audience members. One day he receives an anonymous call, telling him his son and his wife have been kidnapped. The kidnapper threatens him with killing them if he doesn't follow his instructions, making David play his game on live television. This results in David's pursuit to get his family back safe and sound.

== Production ==
=== Development ===
The director was inspired to write the script after watching the documentary “Fuga o Muerte” (Run or Die) about the robbery of Dominican Republic's Banco del Progreso in 1993.

Dominican production house, Antena Latina Films, produced the film. The film premiered on 12 April 2011. The premier was widely publicized through social media by the production company. They encouraged the public to attend the premier by raffling tickets through various media outlets.

== Awards ==
| Award | Result | Notes | Ref. |
|---|---|---|---|
| Palm Springs International Film Festival | Nominated | | |
| Washington D.C. International Film Festival | Win | First Feature Award | |
| Chicago Latino Film Festival | Nominated | | |

== See also ==
- List of submissions to the 85th Academy Awards for Best Foreign Language Film
- List of Dominican submissions for the Academy Award for Best Foreign Language Film
