= Treasure Hunters (2024 film) =

- Theatrical release poster
- Spanish: Cazatesoros
- Directed by: Héctor Valdez
- Written by: Jose Ramón Alamá
- Produced by: Jose Ramón Alamá
- Starring: Carlos Alcántara; Franco Cabrera
- Cinematography: Camilo Soratti
- Edited by: Marcos Caraballo
- Music by: Sergio J. Lacima
- Production companies: Bou Group; La Soga Producciones
- Distributed by: BF Distribution (Peru); Disney+ (world-wide)
- Release date: November 28, 2024 (Peru)
- Running time: 110 minutes
- Countries: Dominican Republic; Peru
- Language: Spanish

Treasure Hunters (Spanish: Cazatesoros) is a 2024 action adventure comedy film directed by Héctor Valdez and written by Jose Ramón Alamá. An international co-production between the Dominican Republic and Peru, the film stars Carlos Alcántara and Franco Cabrera accompanied by Nashla Bogaert, Sergio Galliani and Patricia Barreto.

== Synopsis ==
A treasure hunter embarks on a search for a legendary treasure that belonged to explorer Christopher Columbus. Motivated by his mentor's dream, he embarks on a dangerous journey, where he unexpectedly finds an ally in a young man from the street, who becomes his apprentice as together they face the challenges of adventure.

== Cast ==
- Carlos Alcántara as Clemente Mondego
- Franco Cabrera as Arsenio Dumas
- Nashla Bogaert as Celeste Vega
- Sergio Galliani as Hassam
- Patricia Barreto as Mona
- Víc Gómez as Priest
- Yasser Michelén as Juliano
- Luinis Olaverria as Pancho
- Gerardo Mercedes as Crow
- Ramón García as Don Alfonso
- Luis Eduardo 'Beto' Franco as Ramirez
- Saul Molina as Martinez
- Omar de la Cruz as Scorpion
- Connie Chaparro as Mother
- Patrick Gonzales as Kid
- Attilia Boschetti as Old Lady

== Release ==
It premiered on November 28, 2024, in Peruvian theaters, to then be released worldwide on Disney+, becoming the third Peruvian film to be launched on the platform behind The Year of the Tiger and Welcome to Paradise.

== Reception ==
On its first day in theaters, the film attracted 2,000 viewers, ending its first weekend with 10,000, ranking 9th.
