= Aire: Just Breathe =

- Theatrical release poster
- Directed by: Leticia Tonos
- Written by: Leticia Tonos; Junior Rosario
- Produced by: Leticia Tonos; Jalsen Santana
- Starring: Jalsen Santana; Sophie Gaëlle; Paz Vega
- Cinematography: Luis Enrique Carrión
- Edited by: Gina Giudicelli
- Music by: Pablo Mondragón
- Production companies: Producciones Linea Espiral; Lantica Media; Menos es Más Producciones; Contrasentido PC
- Release dates: January 28, 2024 (IFFR); August 15, 2024 (Dominican Republic)
- Running time: 98 minutes
- Countries: Dominican Republic; Spain
- Language: Spanish

Aire: Just Breathe, or simply Aire, is a 2024 post-apocalyptic science fiction drama film co-written, co-produced and directed by Leticia Tonos. Starring Sophie Gaëlle, Paz Vega and Jalsen Santana. The film follows a biologist's journey to preserve what remains of humanity by implanting artificial intelligence to inseminate herself. It was selected as the Dominican entry for the Best International Feature Film at the 97th Academy Awards, but was not nominated.

== Synopsis ==
In the year 2147, as a result of a Great Chemical War, a virus has left all men on the planet sterile, bringing humanity to the brink of extinction. Biologist and scientist Tania tries to inseminate herself to ensure the survival of the human species, assisted by an artificial intelligence system called VIDA. However, everything changes when Azarias appears, a traveller with a dark past and possibly one of the last men on the planet.

== Cast ==
- Sophie Gaëlle as Tania
- Jalsen Santana as Azarías
- Paz Vega as VIDA
- Camila Cosio as Operational Voice

== Release ==
It had its world premiere on January 28, 2024, at the 53rd International Film Festival Rotterdam, then screened on May 16, 2024, at the 77th Cannes Film Festival, on June 30, 2024, at the Fantastic Zagreb Film Festival, on July 5, 2024, at the 28th Bucheon International Fantastic Film Festival, and on July 12, 2024, at the 34th Galway Film Fleadh.

It was commercially released on August 15, 2024, in Dominican theaters.

== Accolades ==
Year	Award / Festival	Category	Recipient	Result	Ref.
2024	53rd International Film Festival Rotterdam	VPRO Big Screen Award	Aire: Just Breathe	Nominated	

== See also ==
- List of submissions to the 97th Academy Awards for Best International Feature Film
- List of Dominican submissions for the Academy Award for Best International Feature Film
