= Guaguasi =

1983 film

- Film poster
- Directed by: Jorge Ulla
- Written by: Orestes Matacena; Clara Hernandez
- Produced by: Danilo Bardisa; Jorge Ulla
- Starring: Orestes Matacena
- Cinematography: Ramón F. Suárez
- Edited by: Gloria Piñeyro
- Music by: Chico O'farrill
- Release date: 4 November 1983 (Chicago IFF)
- Running time: 107 minutes
- Country: Dominican Republic
- Language: Spanish

Guaguasi is a 1983 Dominican war comedy-drama film directed by Jorge Ulla. The film was selected as the Dominican entry for the Best Foreign Language Film at the 56th Academy Awards, but was not accepted as a nominee.

== Cast ==
- Orestes Matacena as Guaguasi
- Marilyn Pupo as Marina
- Raimundo Hidalgo-Gato as Moya
- Marco Santiago as Raul
- Rolando Barral as Cmndt. Jorge Montiel
- Clara Hernandez as Isabel
- Jose Bahamonde as Flor
- Oswaldo Calvo as Col. Acosta
- Mercedes Enriquez as Elisa
- Andy García as Ricardo

== See also ==
- List of submissions to the 56th Academy Awards for Best Foreign Language Film
- List of Dominican submissions for the Academy Award for Best Foreign Language Film
