= Luis Arístides Fiallo Cabral =

Dominican Republic polymath (1876–1931)

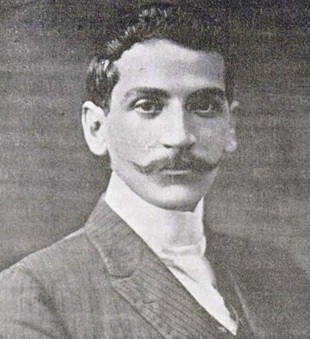
- Born: 8 May 1876; Santo Domingo, Dominican Republic
- Died: 20 March 1931 (aged 54); Santo Domingo, Dominican Republic
- Education: Universidad Autónoma de Santo Domingo
- Spouse: Flor de María Gregoria Henríquez García (m. 1900)
- Children: 7
- Relatives: Fabio Fiallo (brother); Oscar de la Renta (nephew); Viriato Fiallo (nephew); Marcos Antonio Cabral (uncle); Federico Henríquez y Carvajal (father-in-law); José María Cabral (great-nephew); José María Cabral (great-great-grandson)

9q

Luis Arístides Fiallo Cabral (8 May 1876 – 20 March 1931) was a Dominican mathematician, astronomer, biologist, physician, philosopher, educator, and artist. Upon his death the Dominican government declared five days of national mourning in Fiallo's honour.

== Early life ==
Fiallo was born on 8 May 1876 in Santo Domingo to Juan Ramón Rodríguez Fiallo and Ana María Cabral Figueredo. Through his mother Fiallo was the nephew of Marcos Antonio Cabral and the great-nephew of President José María Cabral. Fiallo was the brother of the poet Fabio Fiallo.

Fiallo was educated at the Colegio San Luis Gonzaga. Fiallo received every degree the Universidad Autónoma de Santo Domingo could offer.

== Career ==
Fiallo initially pursued a career in teaching, and in 1901 was appointed the director at a school in Baní. Returning to Santo Domingo, Fiallo enrolled at the Professional Institute (Spanish: Instituto Profesional) where he earned his medical license in 1909. In 1911, Fiallo served as the vice president of the first Dominican Medical Congress. In 1921, Fiallo earnt his medical degree. with a thesis on skin disease. In 1927, Fiallo earnt his law degree but never practiced.

During the American military occupation of the Dominican Republic, Fiallo gave a series of public speeches opposed to the occupation. Fiallo Cabral was member of the Académie des sciences et lettres de Montpellier and the Société Française de Dermatologie. Fiallo was deputy for the Dominican Republic Congress, Dean of the Faculty of Medicine of the University of Santo Domingo, and President of the Dominican Society of Geography. He was the author of the Theory of Biocosmic Universal Gravitation. In the 1920s, Fiallo was a founding member of the International Biocosmic Association (French: Association Internationale Biocosmique).

At the time of his death, Fiallo was serving as the Secretary of State for Health and Welfare.

=== Legacy ===
Following Fiallo's death the Dominican government declared five days of national mourning.

In 1942, a street in Santo Domingo was named after Fiallo.

== Personal life ==
Fiallo was the maternal uncle of the fashion designer Óscar de la Renta, and the paternal uncle of the physician and political activist Viriato Fiallo. Fiallo was the both great-great-grandfather and 1st cousin-thrice removed of film director José María Cabral.

On 27 December 1900, Fiallo married Flor de María Gregoria Henríquez García (1879–1963), the daughter of poet Federico Henríquez y Carvajal. Fiallo and Henríquez had seven children.

On 20 March 1931 Fiallo died in Santo Domingo, aged 54, from pneumonia.
