= A State of Madness =

2020 film

- Film poster
- Directed by: Leticia Tonos
- Starring: Luis José Germán
- Release date: 15 October 2020
- Country: Dominican Republic
- Language: Spanish

A State of Madness (Spanish: Mis 500 Locos) is a 2020 Dominican drama film directed by Leticia Tonos. It was selected as the Dominican entry for the Best International Feature Film at the 93rd Academy Awards, but it was not nominated.

== Synopsis ==
A doctor is working in a mental institution during Rafael Trujillo's dictatorship.

== Cast ==
- Luis José Germán as Dr. Antonio Zaglul
- Jane Santos as Aurora
- Pavel Marcano as Gonzales
- Ico Abreu as El Tuerto
- Rick Montero as El Venezolano
- Lia Chapman as Pichirilli

== See also ==
- List of submissions to the 93rd Academy Awards for Best International Feature Film
- List of Dominican submissions for the Academy Award for Best International Feature Film
