= Cocote =

2017 film

- Film poster
- Directed by: Nelson Carlo de Los Santos Arias
- Written by: Nelson Carlo de Los Santos Arias
- Produced by: Fernando Santos Díaz
- Starring: Vicente Santos
- Release date: 3 August 2017 (Locarno)
- Running time: 106 minutes
- Country: Dominican Republic
- Language: Spanish

Cocote is a 2017 Dominican Republic drama film directed by Nelson Carlo de Los Santos Arias. It was selected as the Dominican entry for the Best Foreign Language Film at the 91st Academy Awards, but it was not nominated.

== Cast ==
- Vicente Santos as Alberto
- Judith Rodíguez as Karina
- Pepe Sierra as Martínez
- Yuberbi Rosa as Patria
- Isabel Spencer as Chave

== See also ==
- List of submissions to the 91st Academy Awards for Best Foreign Language Film
- List of Dominican submissions for the Academy Award for Best Foreign Language Film
