= Sharktopus =

2010 American television film

- TV poster
- Written by: Mike MacLean
- Directed by: Declan O'Brien
- Starring: Eric Roberts; Sara Malakul Lane; Kerem Bürsin; Héctor Jiménez; Liv Boughn; Shandi Finnessey; Megan Barkley
- Music by: Tom Hiel
- Country of origin: United States
- Original language: English

Production
- Producers: Roger Corman; Julie Corman; Robert Roessel; Stephen Niver
- Editor: Vikram Kale
- Running time: 89 minutes

Original release
- Network: Syfy
- Release: September 25, 2010

Related
- Sharktopus vs. Pteracuda; Sharktopus vs. Whalewolf

Sharktopus is a 2010 SyFy original horror/science fiction film produced by Roger Corman, directed by Declan O'Brien, and starring Eric Roberts. It is the first film in the Sharktopus franchise.

== Plot ==
Geneticist Nathan Sands and his daughter Nicole are hired by the U.S. Navy to create a new weapon; they create an intelligent shark that has the tentacles of an octopus, dubbed S-11, controlling the creature using electromagnetic pulses with a device attached to its head. During one of the test missions, S-11 discards the device before traveling to Mexican waters to find food. Sands and his daughter are then assigned to catch S-11 and travel down to Mexico, where they meet up with fishermen Andy Flynn and Santos, who work for Sands to help capture S-11. Andy, Nicole and Santos track S-11 on Andy's boat as Sands and his men follow in a yacht behind them. Several sightings occur as S-11 kills tourists and locals in the area. Fisherman Pez sends a photo of the creature to a news station, and news reporter Stacy Everheart and her cameraman Bones arrive to find the creature, enlisting Pez's help in the process. Stacy researches Sands and deduces that S-11 is a biological experiment. She, Bones and Pez record it killing a few people on a beach before heading into the ocean on Pez's boat to capture more evidence.

Andy and a group of his diver friends go into a cave to find S-11, although the creature attacks them, killing everybody except Andy. He, Nicole and Santos then encounter Stacy, Bones and Pez, although Pez is killed by S-11 before it runs off. Andy, Nicole and Santos pursue it, resulting in Santos being killed. An enraged Andy radios Sands and tells him he's going to kill S-11 despite his orders. Andy and Nicole track S-11 to the mainland, where it kills a few people before Sands and his men arrive and hold Andy hostage. Nicole reprimands her father for wishing to further the experiments, although S-11 arrives and kills Sands's men before Sands himself is killed saving Nicole. Andy and Nicole encounter Stacy and Bones again, who drive them to a resort which S-11 is attacking. Nicole creates a plan to shoot S-11 with a device that will allow her to blow up a computer chip in its brain using her computer. The group arrives at the resort and Bones soon quits as Stacy attempts to put his life in danger to record S-11. However, S-11 then kills them both. Andy manages to shoot S-11 with the device, and Nicole hacks into the chip before overloading it, causing it to explode and kill S-11. Andy and Nicole reunite, and walk off to safety.

== Cast ==
- Eric Roberts as Dr. Nathan Sands
- Sara Malakul Lane as Nicole Sands
- Kerem Bürsin as Andy Flynn
- Héctor Jiménez as "Bones"
- Liv Boughn as Stacy Everheart
- Shandi Finnessey as Stephanie "Stephie"
- Megan Barkley as Lisa
- Peter Nelson as Commander Cox (credited as Calvin Persson)
- Elgar Horowitz as Ellie Loveshaft
- Greg Norte as Gordon
- Roger Corman as Man On Beach (uncredited)
- Ralph Garman as Captain Jack

== Reception ==
On Rotten Tomatoes, Sharktopus has a 50% approval rating, based on 6 reviews, with an average score of 7.0/10.

Kevin Carr of 7M Pictures described it as "cinematic junk food" and gave it 3.5 out of 5.

Annalee Newitz of io9 wrote "Sharktopus represents both your guilt, and the assuaging of it, all in one tasty morsel" and called it the Inception of giant monster movies.

And the review site Bloody Good Horror said of it: "Sharktopus" is absolutely not a good film. The acting is slightly above amateur-level, the plot is pretty formulaic and predictable... and the CG is the absolute worst I've ever seen. (...) But you know what? It all works. Despite its flaws, or perhaps because of them, "Sharktopus" is an insanely entertaining film and easily the best thing I've watched for BGH so far in 2011."

== Home video ==
Sharktopus was released to DVD and Blu-ray on March 15, 2011.

A limited edition soundtrack album containing Tom Hiel's musical score to Sharktopus was released by BSX Records in 2012 and is available on CD and digital MP3.

== Sequels ==
A similarly themed movie, Piranhaconda, was released in 2012.

Two official sequels were made: Sharktopus vs. Pteracuda, which was released on August 2, 2014, and Sharktopus vs. Whalewolf, which premiered on July 19, 2015, during Sharknado Week on the SyFy Channel.

== Remake ==
In 2023 the film was remade in China.

== Influence in sporting culture ==
Amateur soccer team named after the franchise called Sharktopus FC, playing in the Seattle Recreational Adult Team Soccer, made headlines during the qualifiers for the 2026 US Open Cup. The referee of the match was discovered to be a former player for the semi-pro team that beat them, Bellevue Athletic from the United Premier Soccer League. As a result, and following a complaint by Sharktopus FC, the match was voided and must be replayed, with US Soccer announcing the need for safeguards to avoid such a conflict of interest from reoccurring in the future.

== See also ==
- List of killer shark films
- Lusca—A sea creature from Caribbean folklore sometimes portrayed as half-shark, half-octopus
- Monster Shark
