= Nashla Bogaert =

Dominican actress and TV presenter

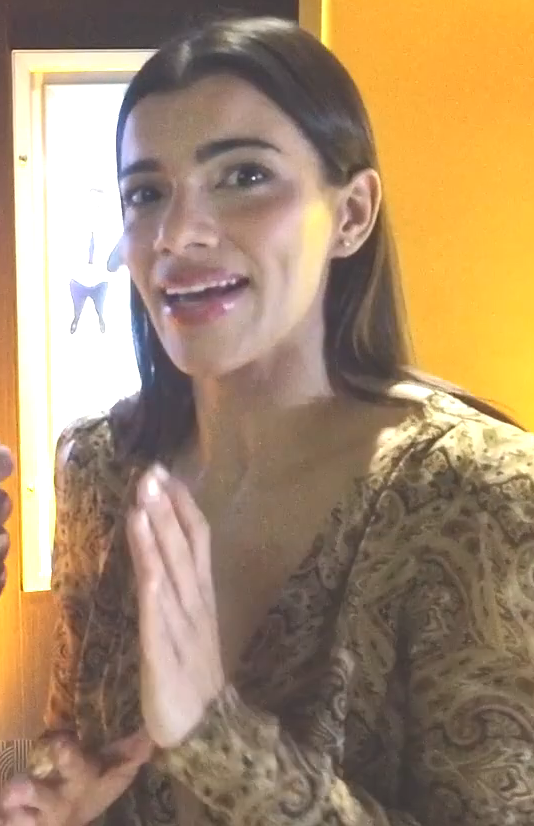
- Bogaert in 2025
- Born: Nashla Bogaert Rosario; 11 May 1986 (age 40); San Francisco de Macorís, Dominican Republic
- Occupations: Actress; Dancer; Television presenter
- Years active: 2004–present
- Height: 1.70 m (5 ft 7 in)
- Spouse: David Maler (m. 2013)
- Partner: Frank Perozo (2007-2008)
- Parents: Ismael Alberto Bogaert Reyes (father); Carmen Rosario Hazim (mother)
- Relatives: Fernando Álvarez Bogaert (first cousin-once removed); Leopoldo Maler (father-in-law)

Nashla Bogaert Rosario (born 11 May 1986) is a Dominican actress and TV host.

== Career ==
In 2004, Nashla Bogaert started her career in the Dominican television on the sabbatine variety show "Divertido con Jochy". She quit in 2012.

In 2018, Bogaert became co-producer of Dominicana's Got Talent, the Dominican Republic spin-off of Simon Cowell's Got Talent international talent show. She will co-produce it with “Tuto” Guerrero, Gilberto Morillo and her husband David Maler. Its first season will air from September to December 2019 on Color Visión.

== Filmography ==
Year	Title	Character	Director
2006	Viajeros	Romelia	Carlos Bidó
2007	Yuniol 2	Carmen	Alfonso Rodríguez
2008	Enigma	Laura	Robert Cornelio
2009	Cristiano de la Secreta	Débora	Archie López
2013	¿Quién Manda?	Natalie	Ronni Castillo
2014	Código Paz	Laura	Pedro Urrutia
2015	Ladrones	María Elena	Joe Menendez
2016	All Men Are the Same	Yoli	Manuel Gómez Pereira
2016	Reinbou	Inma	Andrés Curbelo and David Maler
2017	Colao	Laura	Frank Perozo
2017	Todas las Mujeres son Iguales	Yoli	David Maler
2018	Trabajo sucio	Claribel	David Pagán Mariñe
2018	Lo que siento por ti	Diana	Raúl Camilo
2020	Nadie muere en Ambrosía	Bocanegra	Héctor Valdez
2020	Hotel Coppelia	Gloria	José María Cabral
2021	No es lo que parece	Valeria	David Maler
2023	Cuarencena	Carmen	David Maler
2023	The Method	Esther	David Maler
2023	The Year of the Tiger		Yasser Michelén
2024	Treasure Hunters	Celeste Vega	Héctor Valdez

== Personal life ==
Nashla Bogaert Rosario was born on 11 May 1986 in San Francisco de Macorís. She is the daughter of Alberto Bogaert and Carmen Rosario Hazim. Her paternal grandfather was Alberto Aquilino Manuel Bogaert Román, the fourth child of Libert Louis Bogaert (1866–1935), a Belgian engineer of Belgian origin who migrated to the Dominican Republic in the late 1800s and established in El Cibao region and married Dolores de Jesús Román Grullón (double cousin-twice removed of Juan Isidro Jimenes Grullón, second cousin of Arturo Grullón, and second cousin-twice removed of Alejandro Grullón). Libert Bogaert also served as Consul of Belgium.

In August 2013, Bogaert married Argentine-Dominican actor, film director and musician David Maler, son of the Argentine artist Leopoldo Maler.
