= Woodpeckers (2017 film) =

2017 film

- Film poster
- Directed by: José María Cabral
- Written by: José María Cabral
- Starring: Jean Jean
- Cinematography: Hernan Herrera
- Edited by: José María Cabral
- Music by: Freddy Ginebra
- Distributed by: Film Factory Entertainment
- Release date: 23 January 2017 (Sundance)
- Running time: 106 minutes
- Country: Dominican Republic
- Language: Spanish

Woodpeckers (Spanish: Carpinteros) is a 2017 Dominican Republic drama film directed by José María Cabral. It was screened in the World Cinema Dramatic Competition section of the 2017 Sundance Film Festival. It was selected as the Dominican entry for the Best Foreign Language Film at the 90th Academy Awards, but it was not nominated. In 2017, Cabral won the Havana Star Prize for Best Director for the film at the 18th Havana Film Festival New York.

== Synopsis ==
In adjacent male and female prisons, inmates communicate by "pecking" messages by hand. New prisoner Julian forges an alliance with the hot-tempered Manaury and learns to become a "woodpecker." Complications arise when Yanelly, Manaury's girlfriend, becomes more interested in communicating with Julian.

== Cast ==
- Jean Jean
- Judith Rodriguez Perez
- Ramón Emilio Candelario

== See also ==
- List of submissions to the 90th Academy Awards for Best Foreign Language Film
- List of Dominican submissions for the Academy Award for Best Foreign Language Film
