= One Way Ticket (1988 film) =

1988 film

- Film poster
- Directed by: Agliberto Meléndez
- Written by: Agliberto Meléndez
- Produced by: Agliberto Meléndez
- Starring: Carlos Alfredo
- Cinematography: Peyi Guzmán
- Edited by: Pericles Mejía
- Release date: 18 February 1988
- Running time: 90 minutes
- Country: Dominican Republic
- Language: Spanish

One Way Ticket (Spanish: Un pasaje de Ida) is a 1988 Dominican drama film directed by Agliberto Meléndez. The film was selected as the Dominican entry for the Best Foreign Language Film at the 61st Academy Awards, but was not accepted as a nominee.

== Cast ==
- Carlos Alfredo as Isidro
- Ángel Haché as Piro
- Rafael Villalona as Quimo
- Ángel Muñiz as René
- Víctor Checo as Ángel
- Félix Germán as Berlarminio
- Frank Lendor as Comandante
- Giovanny Cruz as Rufino
- Johanny Sosa as Eladio

== See also ==
- List of submissions to the 61st Academy Awards for Best Foreign Language Film
- List of Dominican submissions for the Academy Award for Best Foreign Language Film
