= Freddy Ginebra =

Dominican journalist and cultural agent

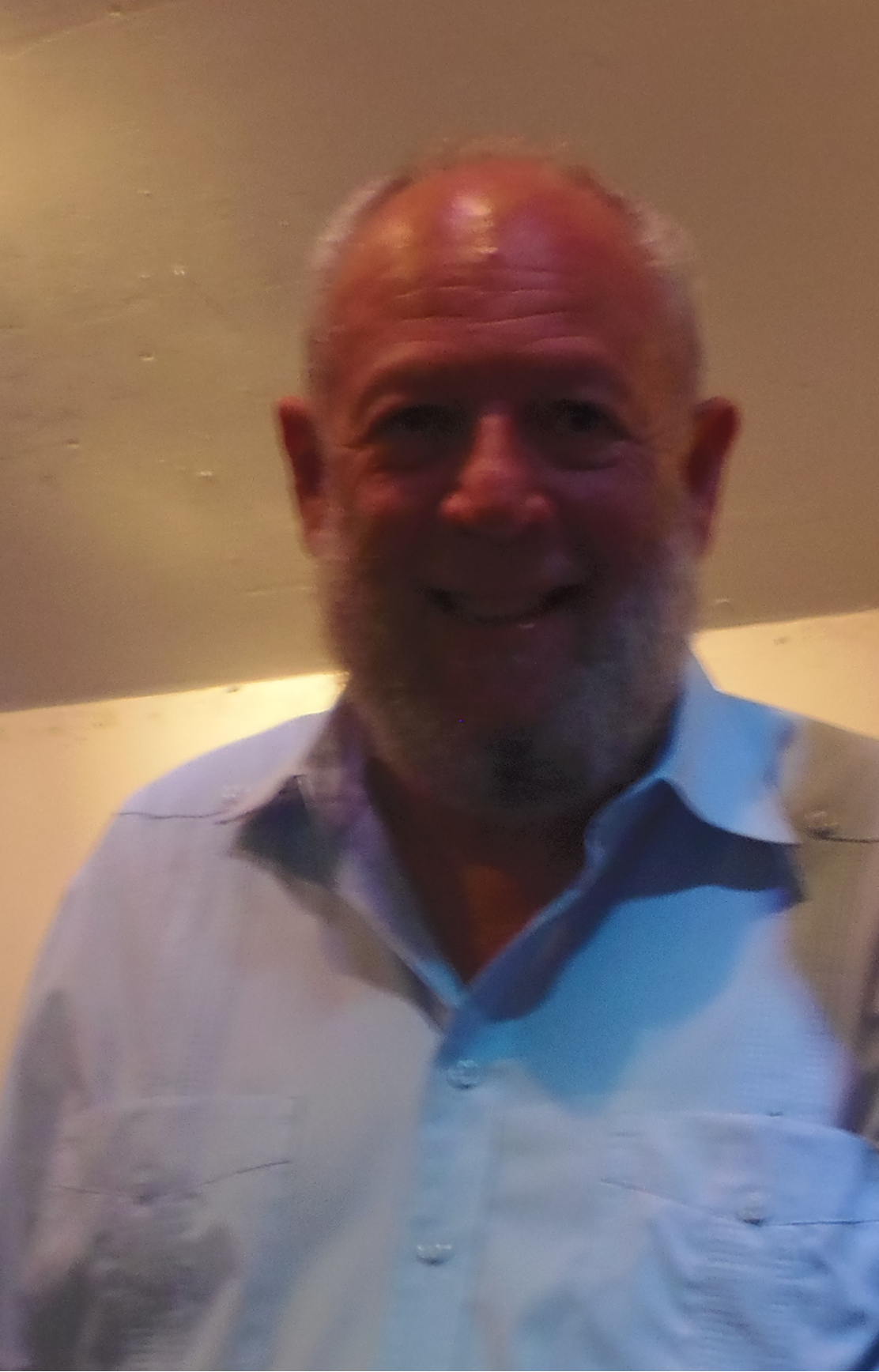
Freddy Ginebra in Havana, January 2015

Freddy Danilo Ginebra Giudicelli (born 17 February 1944 in Santo Domingo) is a cultural agent, writer and Dominican journalist.

Ginebra studied law in the Autonomous University of Santo Domingo and afterwards English philology, communication sciences, cultural administration and public relations at University of New York .

At age 19, in 1964, he produced the television show Cita con la Juventud.

He was President of the Dominican League of Advertising Agencies (LIDAP). In 1974 he founded Casa de Teatro ( House of Theatre), a cultural Center in the city of Santo Domingo, and has been its Director ever since. The Center had a prominent role in the historical Festival Siete Dias con el Pueblo ( Seven days with the people), a cultural protest movement, presenting artists such as Silvio Rodríguez, Mercedes Sosa, Ana Belén, The Guaraguaos, Cuco Valoy, Sonia Silvestre and Johnny Ventura, among others. The Ambassador of France in the Dominican Republic made Ginebra Chevalier of the Ordre des Arts et des Lettres.

Ginebra is cousin of TV presenter and actress Milagros Germán.

Ginebra's debut as an actor is in the movie Mañana no te olvides (Tomorrow Do not Forget), a film by Spanish-Dominican filmmaker José Enrique Pintor.

== Filmography ==
Year	Title	Character	Director	Country
2017	Mañana no te olvides	Roberto	José Enrique Pintor	(Dominican Republic)
2023	Cuarencena	Father	David Maler	(Dominican Republic)

== Sources ==
- Daily Free – Celebrating the Life of Freddy Ginebra
- Ecoguía Dominican Of Freddy Ginebra
- Centre Leon – A dotted meeting of anecdotes and comments of Freddy Ginebra, apropos his more recent acts Celebrating the life
- Embassy of France in Saint Sunday – the French Government condecora to Freddy Ginebra
- Today digital, 13. Julio of 2004: Freddy Ginebra Giudicelli, his success is satisfaction of all
- Listin Newspaper, 25. May of 2014 – Freddy Ginebra: "The terrace of the wishes"
- Daily of Cádiz, 14. November Of 2014: Freddy Ginebra. Mezenas Cultural
