= Dominicana's Got Talent =

- dominicanas got talent
- Genre: Talent Show
- Created by: Simon Cowell
- Developed by: Tuto Guerrero M. Gilberto Morillo; Nashla Bogaert; David Maler
- Presented by: Tuto Guerrero
- Starring: Frank Perozo; Pamela Sued; Francisco Vásquez; Karina Larrauri; Enrique Quailey; Lorenna Pierre
- Judges: Raymond Pozo; Milagros Germán; Nashla Bogaert; Waddys Jaquez; Pamela Sued; Irving Alberti
- Country of origin: Dominican Republic
- Original language: Spanish
- No. of seasons: 3

Production
- Producers: Tuto Guerrero; Gilberto Morillo; David Maler; Nashla Bogaert
- Production locations: Santo Domingo, Dominican Republic
- Camera setup: Multi-camera

Original release
- Network: Color Visión
- Release: 4 September 2019

Dominicana's Got Talent (Spanish: Dominicana Tiene Talento) is a Dominican reality television series which airs on the Color Visión television network. The show is part of the global British Got Talent franchise. It is the first edition of the franchise to be based in a Caribbean country. Dominicana's Got Talent follows the Got Talent format, in which contestants audition in front of four judges and a studio audience. Up until the semifinal and final rounds, the judges decide whether or not a contestant advances in the competition. During the semifinal and final rounds, viewers vote on which contestants will advance.

On April 30, 2020, the show's producers announced on a TV special broadcast by Color Visión, that a second series will air later in 2020. In-person castings were scrapped for the second series, due to the current coronavirus pandemic, and these will happen entirely online.

== Format ==
=== Auditions ===
The general selection process of each season is begun by the production team with open auditions held in various cities across the Dominican Republic. Dubbed "Producers' Auditions", they are held months before the main stage of auditions are held. Those that make it through the initial stage, become participants in the "Judges' Auditions", which are held in select cities across the country, and attended by the judges. Each participant is held offstage and awaits their turn to perform before the judges, whereupon they are given 90 seconds to demonstrate their act, with a live audience present for all performances. At the end of a performance, the judges give constructive criticism and feedback about what they saw, whereupon they each give a vote - a participant who receives a majority vote approving their performance, moves on to the next stage, otherwise they are eliminated from the show at that stage. Each judge has a buzzer, and may use it during a performance if they are unimpressed, hate what is being performed, or feel the act is a waste of their time; if a participant is buzzed by all judges, their performance is automatically over and they are eliminated without being given a vote. Many acts that move on may be cut by producers and may forfeit due to the limited slots available for the second performance. Filming for each season always takes place when the Judges' Auditions are taking place, with the show's presenter standing in the wings of each venue's stage to interview and give personal commentary on a participant's performance. the judges and the host also have the opportunity to hit the Golden Buzzer which can send an act straight to the live shows.

=== Quarter Finals/Semi-Finals ===
During this round, the final selection of participants, which has ranged from between 20 and 60 acts and include those that were chosen as Wildcards by the judges or received the Golden Buzzer, are divided into groups and compete against each other for viewers' and judges' votes. The general structure of the live episodes focuses first on four quarterfinals, and then two semi-finals, aimed at finding that season's finalists. Additional rounds are conducted when required (such as a "Top 8" or a "Top 10", depending on the season). During these stages, the judges still provide feedback on an act's performance when it is over, and can use buzzers to prematurely end a performance before it is over; in the first season, the judges could not end a performance before it was over. Acts which do not secure a sufficient number of votes by the public and/or the judges, are eliminated from the competition.

== Judges and presenters ==
| Season | Presenter | Judges (in order of appearance) |
|---|---|---|
| 1 | Frank Perozo and Pamela Sued | Nashla Bogaert, Raymond Pozo, Milagros "La Diva" German and Waddys Jaquez |
| 2 | Francisco Vásquez & Karina Larrauri | Nashla Bogaert, Raymond Pozo, Pamela Sued & Waddys Jaquez |
| 3 | Enrique Quailey & Lorenna Pierre | Nashla Bogaert, Pamela Sued, Irving Alberti & Waddys Jaquez |

== Season synopses ==
| Season | Premiere | Finale | Winner | Runner-up |
|---|---|---|---|---|
| 1 | September 4, 2019 | December 18, 2019 | Babyrotty | Yucahú |
| 2 | August 7, 2020 | March 10, 2021 | Keren Montero | Diego Jaar |
