= Sharktopus vs. Whalewolf =

2015 television film by Kevin O'Neill

- TV poster
- Written by: Matt Yamashita
- Directed by: Kevin O'Neill
- Starring: Casper Van Dien; Catherine Oxenberg
- Music by: Charles Bernstein; Ryan Beveridge
- Country of origin: United States
- Original language: English

Production
- Producers: Roger Corman; Julie Corman
- Cinematography: Hernan Herrera
- Editor: Karen Smalley
- Running time: 85 min

Original release
- Network: Syfy
- Release: July 19, 2015

Related
- Sharktopus; Sharktopus vs. Pteracuda

Sharktopus vs. Whalewolf is a television film that premiered on July 19, 2015 on Syfy.

It is the third and final installment in the Sharktopus franchise, after Sharktopus (2010) and Sharktopus vs. Pteracuda (2014).

== Plot ==
Since its fight with the Pteracuda, the Sharktopus is still at large and is lurking in the waters of the Dominican Republic. An alcoholic boat captain named Ray (Casper Van Dien) and his sidekick Pablo (Jorge Eduardo de los Santos) are enlisted by a voodoo priest named Tiny (Tony Almont) to obtain the heart of the Sharktopus. Meanwhile, Dr. Reinhart (Catherine Oxenberg), a mad scientist who studied with the late Nathan Sands and the late Rico Symes from the previous two Sharktopus movies, mixes the genes of a killer whale and a wolf (resembling the extinct Pakicetus, an ancestor of modern whales). The resulting treatment transforms Felix Rosa (Mario Artura Hernandez) into the Whalewolf, which causes havoc and results in it fighting with the Sharktopus, then he dies.

== Cast ==
- Catherine Oxenberg as Dr. Reinhart
- Casper Van Dien as Ray
- Akari Endo as Officer Nita Morales
- Jorge Eduardo de los Santos as Pablo
- Jennifer Wenger as Betty
- Tony Almont as "Tiny"
- Mario Arturo Hernández as Felix Rosa

== Reviews ==
Felix Vasquez Jr. of Cinema Crazed would not call the film "a masterpiece, but it's guilty fun". Dylan Grable of Medium.com stated that the film had comedic value, being "so crazy that it culminates in a stupor of stupidity and entertainment".

== Home media ==
No American DVDs of this film were made, but Regions 2 and 4 DVDs were made and are available online.
