= Jupia (film) =

- Theatrical release poster
- Directed by: José Gómez de Vargas; Julietta Rodríguez
- Written by: José Gómez de Vargas; Junior Rosario; Leticia Tonos
- Produced by: Leticia Tonos; Julietta Rodríguez
- Starring: Julietta Rodríguez; David Maler
- Cinematography: Pedro Juan López
- Edited by: Gina Giudicelli; Leticia Tonos
- Music by: Andres Rodriguez
- Production company: Inframundo Films
- Distributed by: Caribbean Films Distribution
- Release dates: 16 September 2022 (NYLFF); 27 October 2022 (Dominican Republic)
- Running time: 86 minutes
- Country: Dominican Republic
- Language: Spanish
- Box office: RD$829,425

Jupia (Spanish: Jupía) is a 2022 Dominican dark fantasy horror film directed by José Gómez de Vargas and Julietta Rodríguez & written by Vargas, Junior Rosario and Leticia Tonos. Starring Rodríguez and David Maler.

== Synopsis ==
The investigation into the murder of the wife and the disappearance of the daughter of police investigator Tomás García has led him to a dilapidated nursing home on the outskirts of the city, where he is confronted by Atabey, an enigmatic nurse with mysterious powers.

== Cast ==
The actors participating in this film are:

- David Maler as Tomás García
- Julietta Rodríguez as Atabey
- Karina Noble
- Luis José Germán
- Elizabeth Chahin
- Andy Frestner

== Release ==
Prior to its theatrical release, it premiered at the Puerto Rico Film Festival, New York Latino International Film Festival, Hubert Bals Development Fund, and Toronto Film Festival The Big Pitch of Caribbean Tales around 2022. It was commercially released on October 27, 2022, in theaters in the Dominican Republic.

== Awards ==
Year	Award	Category	Recipient	Result	Ref.
2023	Soberano Awards	Best Actor	Luis José Germán	Nominated	
2023	Soberano Awards	Best Actress	Julieta Rodríguez	Nominated	
2023	La Silla Awards	Best Picture	Leticia Tonos & Julieta Rodríguez	Nominated	
2023	La Silla Awards	Best Producer	Leticia Tonos & Julieta Rodríguez	Nominated	
2023	La Silla Awards	Best Actor in a Leading Role	David Maler	Nominated	
2023	La Silla Awards	Best Actress in a Leading Role	Julieta Rodríguez	Nominated	
2023	La Silla Awards	Best Actress in a Supporting Role	Karina Noble	Nominated	
2023	La Silla Awards	Best Editing	Leticia Tonos & Gina Giudicelli	Nominated	
2023	La Silla Awards	Best Art Direction	Mónica De Moya	Nominated	
2023	La Silla Awards	Best Production Design	Mónica De Moya	Nominated	
2023	La Silla Awards	Best Special Effects	Juan Pedro Rodríguez Valiente	Nominated	
2023	La Silla Awards	Best Visual Effects	Ricky Gluski	Nominated	
