= The Projectionist (2019 drama film) =

2019 film

- Film poster
- Directed by: José María Cabral
- Starring: Félix Germán
- Release date: 2 March 2019 (Miami IFF)
- Running time: 94 minutes
- Country: Dominican Republic
- Language: Spanish

The Projectionist (Spanish: El proyeccionista) is a 2019 Dominican drama film directed by José María Cabral. It was selected as the Dominican entry for the Best International Feature Film at the 92nd Academy Awards, but it was not nominated.

== Plot ==
Middle-aged Eliseo, a projectionist, travels to rural towns to screen his films. He meets a young woman named Rubi and takes her on the road.

== Cast ==
- Félix Germán as Eliseo Layo
- Cindy Galán as Rubí
- Lia Briones as Koda

== See also ==
- List of submissions to the 92nd Academy Awards for Best International Feature Film
- List of Dominican submissions for the Academy Award for Best International Feature Film
