= Pedro Urrutia =

Dominican film director and publisher

- Born: Pedro Enmanuel Urrutia Liriano; December 23, 1986 (age 39); Santo Domingo, Dominican Republic
- Occupations: Film Director, Producer, Screenwriter, Editor, Publisher.
- Years active: 2010–Present

Pedro Urrutia (born 23 December 1986) is a film director and Dominican publisher.

Pedro Urrutia began working in the film industry after 19 years of working in highly renowned local movie productions in the Dominican Republic. He worked as a post-production assistant, grip, program producer and editor, among other things.

== Career ==
In 2008, just before completing his studies at the Universidad Iberoamericana del Caribe for a degree in advertising communication, he began to apply to film universities abroad. He learned of a grant from director Brett Ratner to study at the New York Film Academy and applied for the grant. The Ratner full scholarship hosted a one-year film-making program for all of 2009.

In 2010, at 23 years old, he returned to the Dominican Republic and founded Ave Studio, a production company specializing in video clips. He was nominated for the 2011 Casandra Awards for the video clip "Vakeró – Que mujer tan chula". In the same year, Pedro Urrutia and Ave Studio's first video clip opened the doors to a voting member of the Latin Academy of Recording Arts & Sciences. Because of this, in 2013, the Soberano Awards (previously the Casandra Awards) nominated "Melymel – En Francés" for video clip of the year.

The video clip also went to the national and international level, entering into top international music programming channels, such as Hispanic Television, NBC Universo, MTV, MTV Latin America, MTV Tres, and Ritmoson Latino, among others. In 2012, however, Urrutia changed course and began to work on what he was really passionate about: cinema. He began working on an idea for his debut, Código Paz. In the same year, he created film production company One Alliance, under terms protected by the film laws of the Dominican Republic.

In 2014, Urrutia assumed control of his debut, Código Paz. The film is of the action genre, which is a new to the Dominican cinema; but it had a very good reception from the local public as well as the approval of two important local cinema chains, Caribbean Cinemas and Palacio del Cine. It was the first Dominican film to open simultaneously in theaters nationwide.

Código Paz has allowed a selection of Urrutia's films to represent the Dominican Republic in the 2015 Goya Awards in the Best Latin American Film category. Código Paz was nominated by the José María Forqué Awards 2015 for the Best Latin American Feature category; it was also nominated for the 2014 La Silla Awards, receiving nine awards, including Best Picture, Best Director, Best, Best Producer, Best Screenplay, Best Editing, Best Sound Design, Best Makeup, Best Supporting Actor, and Best Supporting Actress, thus becoming the most awarded film of the award. Recently, the Dominican Association of Art Historians nominated Código Paz for the Soberano Awards, for Best Picture, Best Director, Best Film Actor and Best Film Actress.

== Filmography ==
=== Films ===
| Year | Film | Studio | Duration | Director | Producer | Writer | Editor |
|---|---|---|---|---|---|---|---|
| 2014 | Código Paz | One Alliance | 96' | Yes | Yes | Yes | Yes |

=== Music videos ===
| Artist | Song | Year | Notes |
|---|---|---|---|
| Vakeró | "Qué Mujer tan Chula" | 2009 | Nominated Best Music Video at the Soberano Awards |
| Prophex | "Sexo & Amor" | 2010 | |
| Ruina Nueva | "Contigo Me Siento" | 2010 | |
| Metropolitan | "No eres Tu Soy Yo" | 2010 | |
| Vakeró | "Ay Mami" | 2011 | |
| Vakeró ft Poeta Callejero | "No hay Amigos" | 2011 | |
| B2 | "Me va a extrañar" | 2011 | |
| Vakeró ft Alfio Lora | "De qué vale" | 2011 | |
| El Batallón | "Pégate de la Botella" | 2012 | Soundtrack movie Quién Manda? |
| El Batallón | "Súper Bien" | 2012 | Soundtrack movie Los Super |
| Rafely Rosario | "Discúlpame" | 2012 | Soundtrack movie Quién Manda? |
| Melymel | "En Francés" | 2012 | Nominated Best Video Clip at the Soberano Awards |
| Joe Veras | "Atrévete" | 2012 | |
| Mozart La Para | "En Para Everybody" | 2013 | |
| Rafely Rosario | "Cuando Nacen Amores" | 2013 | |
| Eddy Herrera | "Me Siento Bien" | 2013 | |
| Grupo Aura | "Te Lloro" | 2013 | |
| Metropolitan | "Boulevard" | 2013 | |
| Diego Ferrani | "Sálvame" | 2015 | |

== Awards ==
| Title | Nominated | Awarded |
|---|---|---|
| Código Paz | José María Forqué Awards (2015) "Best Latin American Feature" Soberano Awards (2015) "Best Picture" "Best Director" "Best Film Actor" "Best Film Actress" La Silla Awards (2014) "Best Picture" "Best Director" "Best Editing" "Best Producer" "Best Screenplay" "Best Supporting Actor" "Best Supporting Actress" "Best Sound Design" "Best Makeup" | |
