= Sugar Fields =

2016 film

- Film poster
- Directed by: Fernando Baez Mella
- Written by: Fernando Baez Mella
- Starring: Héctor Aníbal
- Release date: 28 July 2016
- Running time: 110 minutes
- Country: Dominican Republic
- Language: Spanish

Sugar Fields (Spanish: Flor de Azúcar) is a 2016 Dominican adventure historical drama film directed by Fernando Baez Mella. It was selected as the Dominican entry for the Best Foreign Language Film at the 89th Academy Awards but it was not nominated.

== Cast ==
- Héctor Aníbal as Samuel

== See also ==
- List of submissions to the 89th Academy Awards for Best Foreign Language Film
- List of Dominican submissions for the Academy Award for Best Foreign Language Film
