= Condesa por amor =

2009 telenovela

- Genre: Telenovela; Romance
- Created by: Pablo Vázquez
- Written by: Elsa Echeverría (adaptation)
- Directed by: Caridad Delgado; Roberth Cornelio; Gerardo Herrera
- Starring: Eileen Abad; Gerónimo Gil; Bernie Paz; Daniel Delevin; Michelle Vargas
- Opening theme: "Un amor asi" by Pedro Miguel Morales
- Countries of origin: Venezuela; Dominican Republic
- Original language: Spanish
- No. of episodes: 100

Production
- Editors: Fiorella Suito; Gershon Yaker
- Production company: Venevisión

Original release
- Network: Venevisión

Condesa por amor is a 2009 telenovela produced by Venevisión International. It is a remake of the 1997 telenovela Girasoles para Lucía. This new version stars Eileen Abad and Gerónimo Gil as the main protagonists with the antagonistic participation of Bernie Paz and Michelle Vargas.

This telenovela was filmed in the Dominican Republic.

== Plot ==
Ana Paula Treviño dreams of falling in love with Aníbal Paz-Soldán, one of the richest millionaires in the country. One day while walking in the streets, Ana Paula's purse is snatched, and she mistakes a witness by-stander, Fernando, to be the thief. Fernando is captivated by Ana Paula's beauty and charm, and he is instantly attracted to her. Fernando later discovers that Ana Paula is poor and must work hard in her father's boarding house in order to try to pay their debts. So, he decides to conquer Ana Paula's heart by omitting that he is a Paz-Soldán, and lying that he is merely an employee at the Paz-Soldán company.

Although Ana Paula and Fernando develop a close friendship, she cannot stop thinking about Aníbal, the man of her dreams. Aníbal is the opposite of Fernando: he is proud and arrogant, looks down upon people below his class, and would not even bother to look at a girl like Ana Paula twice. However, a misunderstanding brings Aníbal and Ana Paula together when he mistakes her for Catalina Lampedusa, an Italian aristocrat known as the Countess of Cogorno.

So, Ana Paula continues to pretend to be a rich countess in order to win Aníbal's heart. However, this is not easy for her, as she has to face Adriana, Aníbal's lover, who will go to any lengths to expose her, and her feelings for her true prince charming, Fernando.

== Cast ==
- Eileen Abad as Ana Paula Treviño
- Gerónimo Gil as Fernando Paz-Soldán
- Bernie Paz as Aníbal Paz-Soldán
- Daniel Delevin as Hugo
- Michelle Vargas as Beatriz Paz-Soldán
- Lourdes Berninzón as Laura Jiménez viuda de Paz Soldán
- Isaura Taveras as Adriana
- Pericles Mejía
- Sonia Alfonso
- Sharlene Taulé
- Ramia Estévez
- Jose Manuel Rodríguez
- Zeny Leyva as Romina Treviño
- Hony Estrella as Josephina
- Nicole Valdéz Abud
- Luis Natera ... Renato
- Mario Hernández
- Hensy Pichardo
- Zdenka Kalina
- Patricia Banks
- Marquis Leguizamon
- Cesar Olmos
- Josué Guerreros
- Conrado Ortiz
- Omar Ramírez
- Mariela González
- Vanessa Cucurrulo
- María Ureña
