= Michelle Vargas =

Dominican actress

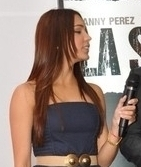
- Vargas in 2010
- Born: 2 March 1985 (age 41); San Francisco de Macorís, Dominican Republic
- Occupations: Actress; model
- Years active: 2003–present
- Spouse(s): Sebastien Charny (m. 2011–2014)

Michele Vargas (born 2 March 1985) is a Dominican model and actress.

== Biography ==
Michele Vargas was born in San Francisco de Macorís, Dominican Republic in 1985 and grew up in New York City in the well known neighborhood of Washington Heights. Her fame soared when she won the Telemundo reality show Protagonistas de Novela 2 in Miami, Florida. After winning she moved to Mexico to study performing arts, acting, cinema and other courses related to television and film. Plus perfected her skills in singing and music history. While living in Mexico, she worked in the Spanish-language novela Los Plateados, after three years in Mexico she decided to return to Miami to continue her acting career.

Telemundo hired her as an exclusive actress of the Network and she then appeared in successful novelas such as Decisiones, La Viuda de Blanco, Mas Sabe el Diablo, Aurora just to name a few. She participated in Univision Network novela Talisman and began reviewing projects for 2013.

Her model experience includes commercials for companies such as Nike, Cyber Computers, Domino's Pizza, Colgate, Aquafina, Dove and Unefon.

== Filmography ==
Show	Year	Type	Role
Eva la trailera	2016	TV series	Sofia Soler
Ballers	2014	TV series	Dashi
El Talismán	2012	TV series	Sarita
Jaque mate	2011	Movie	Alejandra H.
Aurora	2010–2011	TV series	Daniela
Badass!	2010	TV series	Badass Girl
Condesa por amor	2010	TV series	Adriana
Mas sabe el diablo	2009–2010	TV series	Perla Beltran
Carpe Diem	2009	Movie	Elizabeth
I didn't know who I was	2008	Short	Ana
La viuda de blanco	2006	TV series	Valeria Sandoval
Los Plateados	2005	TV series	Laila Bashur
Protagonistas de Novela 2	2003	TV series	Herself
