= No es lo que parece =

- Theatrical release poster
- Directed by: David Maler
- Written by: David Maler
- Produced by: Robert Carrady; Zumaya Cordero; Celinés Toribio; Kendy Yanoreth
- Starring: Nashla Bogaert; Frank Perozo; Fabián Ríos; Gaby Espino
- Cinematography: Luis Enrique Carrión
- Edited by: José Delio Ares
- Music by: Sergio Jiménez Lacima
- Production company: Caribbean Films
- Distributed by: Caribbean Films Distribution
- Release date: April 29, 2021
- Running time: 98 minutes
- Country: Dominican Republic
- Language: Spanish

No es lo que parece (lit. 'It's not what it seems') is a 2021 Dominican romantic comedy film written and directed by David Maler. Starring Nashla Bogaert, Frank Perozo, Fabián Ríos, Gaby Espino, Jaime Mayol, Pepe Sierra, Bolívar Valera and Evelyna Rodríguez. It premiered on April 29, 2021, in Dominican, Puerto Rican and other Caribbean islands theaters.

== Synopsis ==
Juanma has the life she has always wanted. An organized routine, a comfortable job and the same girlfriend for nine years. This is until he decides to propose to her on their anniversary, when he discovers something that makes his perfect world fall apart. Luckily he has the best friends in the world, who manage to get him out of his depression, through the unconventional methods of the therapist Valeria, with the result that medicine can be more dangerous than disease.

== Cast ==
The actors participating in this film are:

- Frank Perozo as Juan 'Juanma' Manuel
- Nashla Bogaert as Valeria
- Bolívar Valera as Raúl
- Pepe Sierra as Beto
- Jaime Mayol as Eduardo
- Gaby Espino
- Fabián Ríos as Mr. Grimaldi
- Evelyna Rodríguez as Mariela
- Candy Flow as Margot
- Chimbala as Cousin
- Jenny Blanco as Juanma's sister
- Lissette Eduardo

== Production ==
Principal photography began on January 16, 2020, in Santo Domingo, Dominican Republic.
