= Fabio Fiallo =

Dominican writer, politician, diplomat (1866–1942)

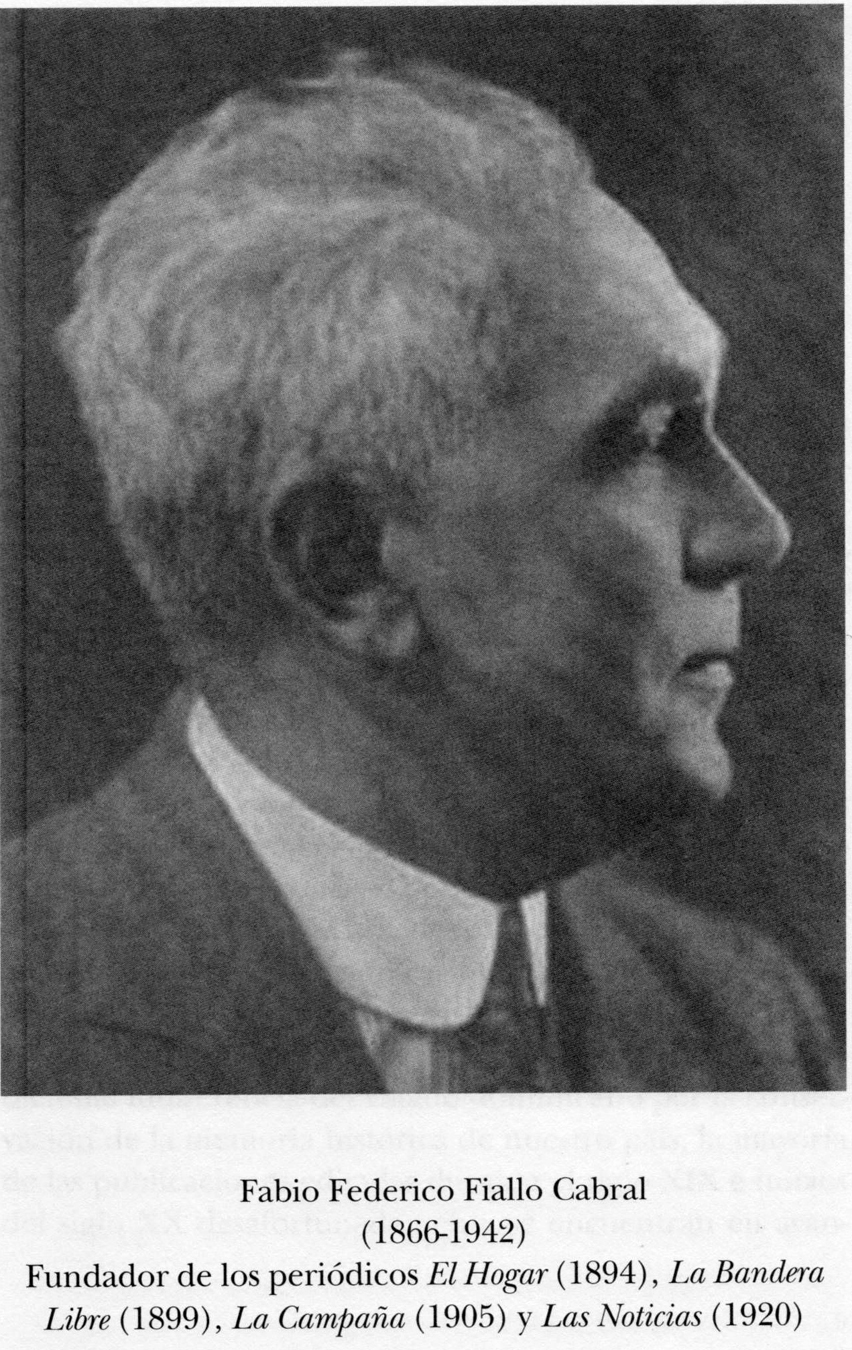
- Born: Fabio Federico Fiallo Cabral; 3 February 1866; Santo Domingo, Dominican Republic
- Died: 29 August 1942 (aged 76); Havana, Cuba
- Occupations: Writer, poet, politician, diplomat
- Spouses: Prudencia Lluberes Contreras (m. 1892; died 1897) María Luisa Bonetti Ernest (m. 1905)
- Relatives: Luis Arístides Fiallo (brother); Viriato Fiallo (nephew and son-in-law); Oscar de la Renta (nephew); Marcos Cabral (uncle); José María Cabral y Báez (cousin); José María Cabral Bermúdez (1st cousin-once removed); José María Cabral y Luna (grandfather); José María Cabral González (film director) (both great-great-grandnephew and 1st cousin-thrice removed)

Fabio Fiallo, in full Fabio Federico Fiallo Cabral (February 3, 1866 – August 29, 1942) was a Dominican Republic writer, poet, politician, and diplomat, primarily known for his modernist short stories and verses, as well as being an outspoken anti-imperialist during the American occupation of 1916–1924. Intensely patriotic, he was one of the most prominent critics and leaders of the opposition to occupation, alongside Américo Lugo; though, as a result of his political writings, Fiallo was sentenced to 3 years of hard labor in 1920.

Aside from his more patriotic works, Fiallo wrote romantic poems that evoke sensuous passion and profound tones of love. Of Fiallo’s prose, his chief claim to fame rests upon his two books of short stories —Cuentos Frágiles and Las Manzanas de Mefisto. The former was published in New York in 1908, with a second edition edited in Madrid in 1929. Las Manzanas de Mefisto was published in Havana in 1934. Cuentos Frágiles is popular throughout the world and has been translated to German, French, Italian, and Portuguese. He died in 1942 in Cuba in exile.

== Early life ==
Fiallo was born on February 3, 1866, in Santo Domingo, Dominican Republic. His interest in politics stemmed from his family’s deep political roots: his parents were Juan Ramón Fiallo Rodríguez, a politician and member of Congress of the Dominican Republic in 1867, and Ana María Cabral y Figueredo, the niece of the president of the republic, General José María Cabral. He first began writing poetry at the age of twelve, after falling in love. From a young age he also had the political guidance of his father, who took part in important committees to negotiate a Treaty of Peace, Friendship and Commerce between Haiti and the Dominican Republic. After joining the Faculty of Law at the Instituto Profesional de Santo Domingo (later as Instituto Profesional, en Universidad de Santo Domingo and now as Universidad Autónoma de Santo Domingo), he abandoned his studies to devote himself to politics and poetry.

He was also uncle of fashion designer Oscar de la Renta and the politician Viriato Fiallo, the latter was also his son-in-law due to a cousin marriage between Viriato and Prudencia Fiallo, Fabio's daughter.

== Career ==
His political activities limited his career as a writer. He was imprisoned for defending Dominican independence during the 1916-1924 American occupation of the Dominican Republic. He was a founder of the newspapers El Hogar (1894), La Bandera Libre (1899), La Campaña (1905) y Las Noticias (1920) and was also a contributor to the Listín Diario and El Lápiz.

Fiallo was arrested in the last months of 1900 with Arturo Pellerano Alfau, director of Listín Diario during the escalations of repression against the press of the Liberal government of Juan Isidro Jiménes.

He was a member of the National Press Association, directed in 1916 by Arturo J. Pellerano Alfau which also included Américo Lugo, Conrado Sanchez, Juan Durán, Manuel A. Machado, and Félix Evaristo Mejía, among others. Through this group the first complaints to the international community in opposition to the U.S. occupation of the Dominican Republic were performed.

In 1916, Fiallo was apprehended by authorities, under the unfounded allegation of being involved in the revolutionary movement started on April 14 and headed by Desiderio Arias, and imprisoned in the Fortaleza Ozama. He was sentenced to five years of forced labor and was ordered to pay a five thousand dollar fine for having published an article in the Listin Diario before it could have been approved by the censorship committee. However, this did nothing to curtail Fiallo’s nationalistic output, which did not end with the demise of the Free Flag movement, in fact it made him more radical.

In his "Fabio Fiallo in the Free Flag: 1899–1916," Rafael Dario Herrera writes: "In September 1899, he founded the newspaper The Flag Royalty circulating three times a week in major urban centers, and, like most print media at the time, had four pages, the first of which, contrary to what happens today, was entirely devoted to advertising and on the inside pages included opinion pieces with little news. At the time, newspapers were still generating income with fixed and placed with obituaries that lawyers and merchants, usually foreign subscriptions. Newspaper survived until early 1900, and defined itself, in this first time, as a "political and general interest " publication. Later reappeared in 1915 until its demise in late 1916. free Banner is a newspaper combat, scathing, incisive, teller of national issues. Emerges in a transitional stage between the defunct dictatorship Heureaux (July 1899) and the government of Jiménes (November 1899). Your target is outlined in the initial editorial : "We will fight for the final victory in the institutions and practice of liberal ideas will preach freedom at all costs the depredations, the nepotism, cliques, monopolies, have against us . . yours" . Although the first step in that circulated Banner Royalty had not yet opted the Jimenistas groupings (or bowling) and Horacistas (coludos), its pages contain sharp criticism against the first as Jimenes was seen as the main opposition lilisista of dictatorship, especially for his expedition aboard the steam Fanita in 1898, and that had obvious sympathy with the dictatorship between groups of literate urban Fiallo was part of that. Thus, in October 1899, before the election, with reservations accepted Fiallo candidacy Jiménes.6 died in Havana, Cuba, 28 August 1942. His remains were transferred to Dominican Republic in 1977 by order of the government then presided Dr. Joaquín Balaguer. His remains rest in the National Pantheon of the Dominican Republic in Santo Domingo.

== Poetry and prose ==
Despite his relative obscurity, Fiallo was close friends with Nicaraguan poet, Rubén Dario, the leader of the modernista movement, who was one of his most fervent admirers: "Few times have I written about a poet with so much pleasure as now about Fabio Fiallo. I love the souls of pearl and the manners of silk." Fiallo was by nature cosmopolitan, elegant, and a lover of the beautiful, the luxurious, the refined, and the exotic. Critics have found in his poetic works an imitation of Becquer, Heine, and de Musset, however he himself denies the influence of both Heine and Becquer, saying he’s not as bitter and sarcastic as Heine nor a sorrowful grumbler like Becquer.

Juana de Ibarbourou sees in him the Alfredo de Musset of America. She further says of him: “All in his verse is charming, sumptuous, and regal. One cannot find in Fabio Fiallo poems of the hoe and hammer; verses with the crazy rhythm of jazz, strophes that seem to be born in one of those machines that are killing in this world true poetry and noble manual work. For his honor we shall say he is backward in this mechanical and noisy hour in the world, as a king in the hour of the revolutionary crowds. Thus Dario thus Heine, and thus Becquer. It is worthwhile to be backward in such company." He has also stated that the writers who most influenced him in his short stories are Guy de Maupassant, Catulle Mendès, and Edgar Allan Poe.

== Works ==
- Primavera sentimental (1902)
- Cuentos frágiles (1908)
- Cantaba el ruiseñor (1910)
- Canciones de la tarde (1920)
- Plan de acción y liberación del pueblo dominicano (1922)
- Jurb (1922)
- La cita (1924)
- Canto a la bandera (1925)
- La canción de una vida (1926)
- Las manzanas de Mefisto (1934)
- El balcón de Psiquis (1935)
- Poemas de la niña que está en el cielo (1935)
- Sus mejores versos (1938)
