= The Year of the Tiger (2023 film) =

El Año del Tigre
- Theatrical release poster
- Directed by: Yasser Michelén
- Written by: Jose Ramon Alama
- Produced by: Jose Ramon Alama; Vicente Alama; Fior De Valdez; Héctor Valdez
- Starring: Carlos Alcántara Vilar; Wendy Ramos; Gonzalo Torres
- Cinematography: Juan Carlos Gómez
- Edited by: Gilberto Amado
- Music by: Sergio Jiménez Lacima
- Production company: Bou Group
- Distributed by: Star Distribution (through Cinecolor Films Peru)
- Release date: March 30, 2023
- Countries: Peru; Dominican Republic
- Language: Spanish

The Year of the Tiger (Spanish: El Año del Tigre) is a 2023 crime comedy film directed by Yasser Michelén and written by Jose Ramon Alama. The film stars Carlos Alcántara, Wendy Ramos and Gonzalo Torres. It premiered on March 30, 2023, in Peruvian theaters by Star Distribution.

== Synopsis ==
A restaurant is about to go bankrupt, so the owners will do everything possible to prevent it. They will go through many adventures, and they will have to face conflicts with people, between good and bad, gangsters and scammers.

== Cast ==
The actors participating in this film are:

- Carlos Alcántara as Samsa
- Wendy Ramos as Teresa
- Frank Perozo
- Gonzalo Torres
- Andrea Sofia Pimentel
- Jossi Martínez
- Salvador Perez Martinez
- Nashla Bogaert
- Luinis Olaverria
- Vicente Santos
- Ana Maria Arias
