= All Men Are the Same (2016 film) =

- Theatrical release poster
- Todos los hombres son iguales
- Directed by: Manuel Gómez Pereira
- Written by: Manuel Gómez Pereira; José Ramon Alama; Miguel Alcántara; Andrés Curbelo
- Based on: All Men Are the Same by Manuel Gómez Pereira
- Produced by: José Ramón Alama; Héctor M. Valdez; Carlos Germán; Vicente Alama
- Starring: Frank Perozo; Christian Meier; Mike Amigorena; Nashla Bogaert
- Cinematography: Aitor Mantxola
- Edited by: José Salcedo
- Music by: Sergio Jiménez Lacima
- Production company: Bou Group
- Release dates: June 26, 2016 (DFFNY); June 30, 2016 (Dominican Republic)
- Running time: 86 minutes
- Country: Dominican Republic
- Language: Spanish

All Men Are the Same (Spanish: Todos los hombres son iguales) is a 2016 Dominican comedy film directed by Manuel Gómez Pereira and written by Pereira, José Ramon Alama, Miguel Alcántara and Andrés Curbelo. It is a remake of the 1994 Spanish film of the same name and by the same director. Starring Frank Perozo, Christian Meier, Mike Amigorena and Nashla Bogaert.

== Synopsis ==
3 men in the process of divorcing meet and decide to live together with the rule that no woman can spend more than one night in the house, but things get complicated with the maid's stay.

== Cast ==
The actors participating in this film are:

- Frank Perozo as Manolo
- Christian Meier as Joaquín
- Mike Amigorena as Juan Luis
- Nashla Bogaert as Yoli
- Lumi Lizardo as Susana
- Cynthia Guzmán as Stewardess
- Cecile van Welie as Yessi
- Hony Estrella as Esther
- Josue Guerrero as Eduardo
- Miguel Alcantara as Leo
- Geisha Montes De Oca as Maribel
- Emil Ceballos as Aníbal
- Georgina Duluc as Merchy
- Ricardo De Marchena as Anthony
- Raeldo López as Sebastián
- Ariel De Marchena as Álvaro
- Josefina Rodríguez as Tamara
- Augustin Rousseau as Johnny
- Reyna Ávalo as Lorelai
- Amaury Sanchez as Boss of Juan Luis
- Hensy Pichardo as Lawyer

== Release ==
=== Domestic ===
All Men Are the Same had its world premiere on June 26, 2016, at the 5th Dominican Film Festival. 4 days later, it was released commercially in Dominican theaters.

=== International ===
It premiered on July 14, 2016, in Puerto Rican theaters, then it premiered on October 6 of the same year in Peruvian theaters.
