= The Method (2023 film) =

- Theatrical release poster
- Spanish: El método
- Directed by: David Maler
- Screenplay by: Andrés Curbelo; David Maler
- Based on: El mètode Grönholm by: Jordi Galceran; The Method; by Marcelo Piñeyro
- Produced by: Nashla Bogaert; Pedro García; Rafael Llaneza; David Maler; Gilberto Morillo
- Starring: Nashla Bogaert; Héctor Aníbal; Georgina Duluc; Pepe Sierra; Yasser Michelén; Dahiana Castro; Roger Wasserman
- Cinematography: Sebastian Cabrera Chelin
- Edited by: Nacho Ruiz Capillas
- Music by: Sergio Jiménez Lacima
- Production companies: Cacique Films; Skyfilms
- Distributed by: Caribbean Films Distribution
- Release dates: September 13, 2023 (Fine Arts); September 21, 2023 (Dominican Republic)
- Running time: 94 minutes
- Country: Dominican Republic
- Language: Spanish

The Method (spanish: El método) is a 2023 Dominican comedy-drama thriller film co-produced and directed by David Maler from a screenplay he co-wrote with Andrés Curbelo. It is based on the play El mètode Grönholm by Jordi Galceran as well as the 2005 film by Marcelo Piñeyro. The ensemble cast is made up of Nashla Bogaert, Héctor Aníbal, Georgina Duluc, Pepe Sierra, Yasser Michelén, Roger Wasserman and Dahiana Castro in her film acting debut.

== Synopsis ==
A group of professionals competes for a lucrative position at a multinational company, but a strange selection process without an interviewer pushes them to their limits, revealing their darkest and most savage instincts.

== Cast ==
The actors participating in this film are:

- Nashla Bogaert as Esther;
- Héctor Aníbal as Juanma;
- Georgina Duluc as Lulú;
- Pepe Sierra as Enrique;
- Yasser Michelén as Carlos;
- Roger Wasserman as Grönholm;
- Dahiana Castro as Maripily;
- René Monclova as Announcer.

== Release ==
The Method had its world premiere on September 13, 2023 year, at the 3rd Fine Arts Film Festival Made in the Dominican Republic as the closing film, then was commercially released on September 21 in Dominican theaters.

== Accolades ==
Award / Festival	Date of ceremony	Category	Recipient(s)	Result	Ref.
Fine Arts Film Festival Made in the Dominican Republic	13 September 2023	Best Film	The Method	Won	
Fine Arts Film Festival Made in the Dominican Republic	13 September 2023	Best Director	David Maler	Won	
Fine Arts Film Festival Made in the Dominican Republic	13 September 2023	Best Leading Actor	Pepe Sierra	Won	
Soberano Awards	12 March 2024	Best Film - Drama	The Method	Nominated	
Soberano Awards	12 March 2024	Best Director	David Maler	Won	
Soberano Awards	12 March 2024	Best Film Actress	Nashla Bogaert	Nominated	
Soberano Awards	12 March 2024	Best Film Actor	Pepe Sierra	Nominated	
La Silla Awards	19 June 2024	Best Picture	Pedro García, Rafael Llaneza, Nashla Bogaert, David Maler	Nominated	
La Silla Awards	19 June 2024	Best Actress in a Leading Role	Nashla Bogaert	Nominated	
La Silla Awards	19 June 2024	Best Actor in a Leading Role	Pepe Sierra	Won	
La Silla Awards	19 June 2024	Best Actress in a Supporting Role	Georgina Duluc	Nominated	
La Silla Awards	19 June 2024	Best Actor in a Supporting Role	Héctor Aníbal	Nominated	
La Silla Awards	19 June 2024	Best Cinematography	Sebastian Cabrera Chelin	Nominated	
La Silla Awards	19 June 2024	Best Art Direction	Ricky Folch	Nominated	
La Silla Awards	19 June 2024	Best Production Design	Shaina Cohen	Nominated	
La Silla Awards	19 June 2024	Best Casting Direction	Miguel Fernández	Nominated	
La Silla Awards	19 June 2024	Best Poster Design	Luis Miguel Molina Dickson	Nominated	
ADOPRESCI Awards	18 July 2024	Best Director	David Maler	Nominated	
ADOPRESCI Awards	18 July 2024	Best Actress	Georgina Dulu	Nominated	
ADOPRESCI Awards	18 July 2024	Best Actor	Pepe Sierra	Nominated	
ADOPRESCI Awards	18 July 2024	Best Cinematography	Sebastián Cabrera Chelín	Nominated	
ADOPRESCI Awards	18 July 2024	Best Editing	Nacho Ruiz Capillas	Nominated	
ADOPRESCI Awards	18 July 2024	Best Musicalization	Sergio Jiménez Lacima	Nominated	
ADOPRESCI Awards	18 July 2024	Best Sound	Denis Godoy	Nominated	
ADOPRESCI Awards	18 July 2024	Best Production Design	Shaina Cohen	Nominated	
ADOPRESCI Awards	18 July 2024	Best Cast	The Method	Won	
