= Oscar de la Renta =

Dominican fashion designer (1932–2014)

Óscar de la Renta
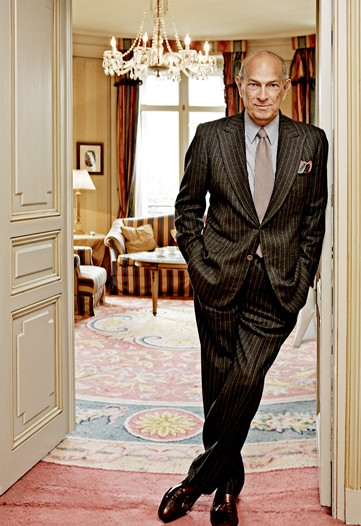
- De la Renta in 2008
- Born: Óscar Arístides de la Renta y Fiallo; 22 July 1932; Santo Domingo, Dominican Republic
- Died: 20 October 2014 (aged 82); Kent, Connecticut, U.S.
- Citizenship: Dominican Republic; United States
- Education: Real Academia de Bellas Artes de San Fernando
- Label: Oscar de la Renta
- Spouses: Françoise de Langlade (m. 1967; died 1983) Annette Engelhard (m. 1989)
- Children: Moisés de la Renta
- Relatives: Luis Álvarez Renta (nephew); Fabio Fiallo (uncle); Luis Arístides Fiallo (uncle); Viriato Fiallo (cousin); Larimar Fiallo (first cousin-twice removed); José Ortíz de la Renta (great-great-grandfather)
- Awards: CFDA Lifetime Achievement Award; American Fashion Critic's Award; Order of Juan Pablo Duarte; Order of Christopher Columbus
- Website: www.oscardelarenta.com

Signature
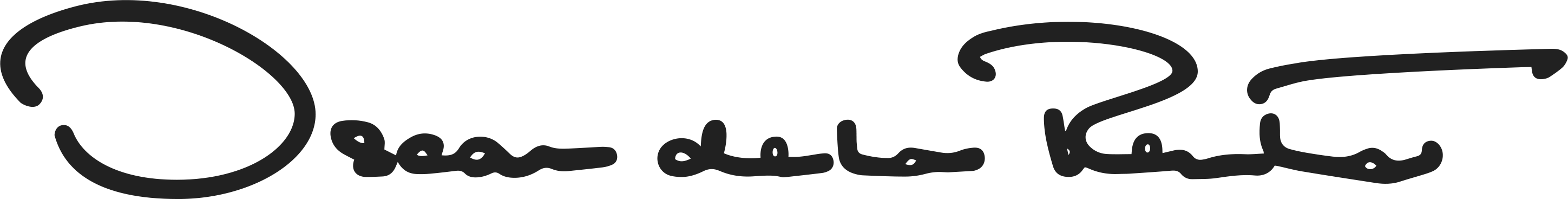

Óscar Arístides de la Renta y Fiallo (22 July 1932 – 20 October 2014) was a Dominican fashion designer. Born in Santo Domingo, he was trained by Cristóbal Balenciaga and Antonio del Castillo. De la Renta became internationally known in the 1960s as one of the couturiers who dressed Jacqueline Kennedy. He worked for Lanvin and Balmain. His eponymous fashion house has boutiques around the world, and is headquartered on Madison Avenue in Manhattan.

== Early life ==
De la Renta, the youngest of seven children and the only boy in his family, was born in Santo Domingo, Dominican Republic, to a Dominican mother, Carmen María Antonia Fiallo and a Puerto Rican father, Óscar Avelino de la Renta, owner of an insurance company. The Fiallos, De la Renta's mother's family, were embedded in Dominican society, and counted poets, scholars, businessmen, and top army brass among their members. Their family origin in the island can be traced back to the foundation of San Carlos de Tenerife in 1685 by Spanish Canarian settlers.

A maternal uncle, Luis Arístides Fiallo, was a noted polymath. Another maternal uncle, Fabio Fiallo, was a diplomat and poet. On his father's side, De la Renta's great-great-grandfather José Ortíz de la Renta was the first mayor of Ponce, Puerto Rico.

De la Renta was raised Catholic. His mother died from complications of multiple sclerosis when he was 18.

At the age of 18, he went to study painting in Spain at the Royal Academy of San Fernando in Madrid. For extra money, he drew clothes for newspapers and fashion houses. After Francesca Lodge, the wife of John Davis Lodge, the U.S. Ambassador to Spain, saw some of his dress sketches, she commissioned de la Renta to design a gown for her daughter. The dress appeared on the cover of Life magazine that fall. He quickly became interested in the world of fashion design and began sketching for leading Spanish fashion houses, which soon led to an apprenticeship with Spain's most renowned couturier, Cristóbal Balenciaga. He considered Cristóbal Balenciaga his mentor. In 1961, de la Renta left Spain to join Antonio del Castillo as a couture assistant at Lanvin in Paris.

== Career ==
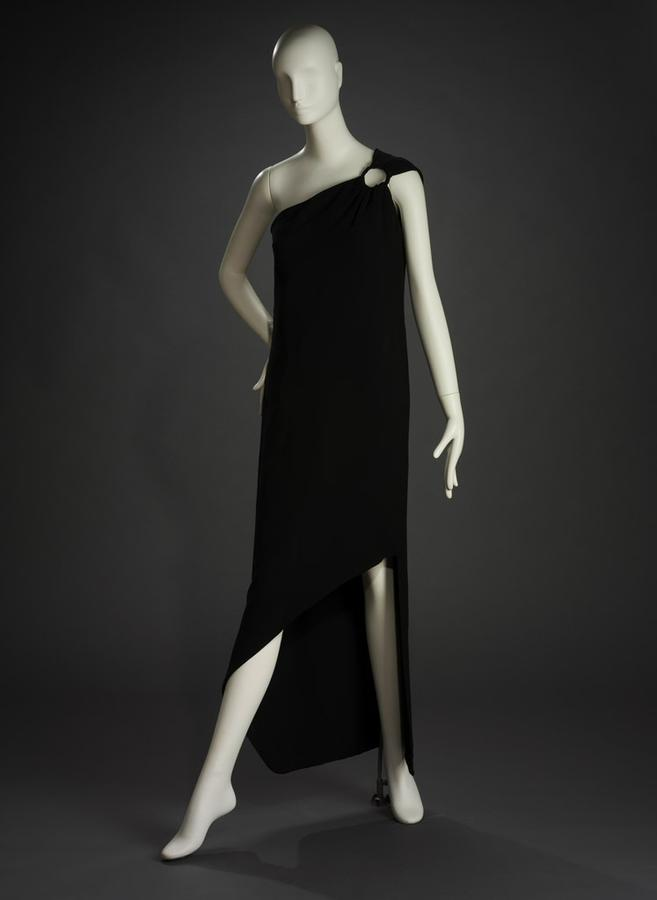
1966 cocktail dress designed by de la Renta at Elizabeth Arden

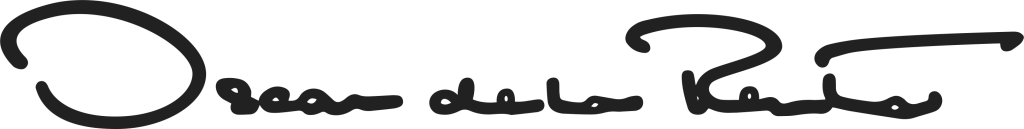
Óscar de la Renta label

In 1963, de la Renta turned to Diana Vreeland, the editor-in-chief of Vogue, for advice. Vreeland advised de la Renta to work for Elizabeth Arden. De la Renta proceeded to work for Arden for two years in New York City before he went to work for Jane Derby, an American fashion house. When Derby died in August 1965, de la Renta took over the label.

From 1993 to 2002, de la Renta designed the haute couture collection for the house of Balmain, becoming the first Dominican to design for a French couture house. In 2006, the Oscar de la Renta label diversified into bridal wear.

De la Renta's designs have been worn by a diverse group of distinguished women and celebrities, including pop star Taylor Swift. De la Renta's brand saw international wholesale growth beginning in 2003, under the direction of CEO Alex Bolen, from five to seventy-five locations, in addition to online and retail.

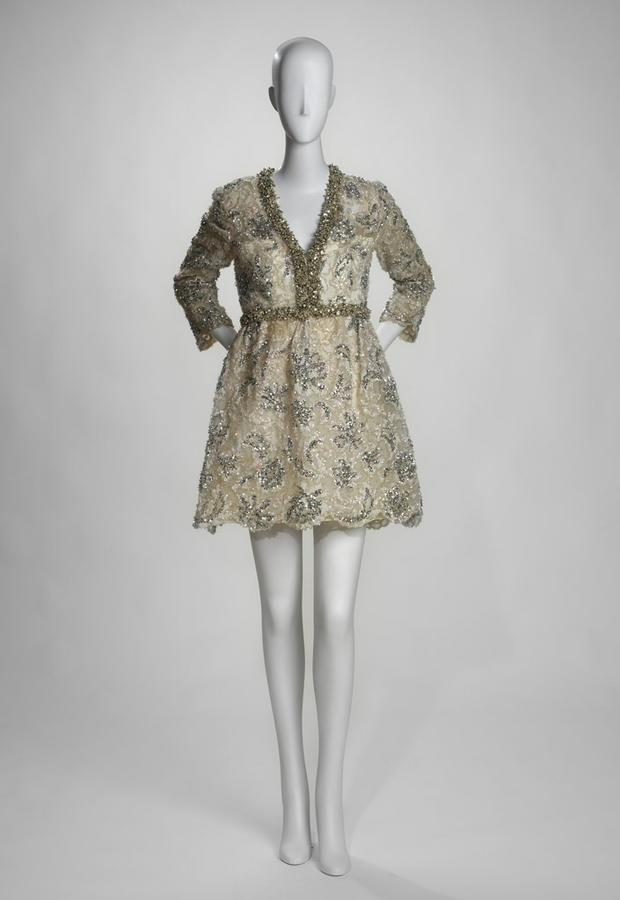
1966 beaded cellophane lace cocktail minidress

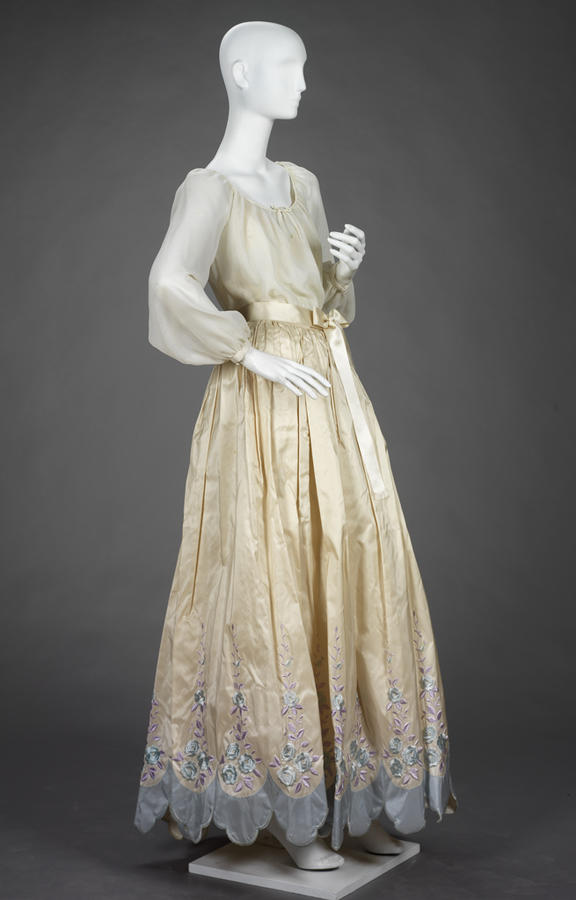
1977 embroidered taffeta evening ensemble

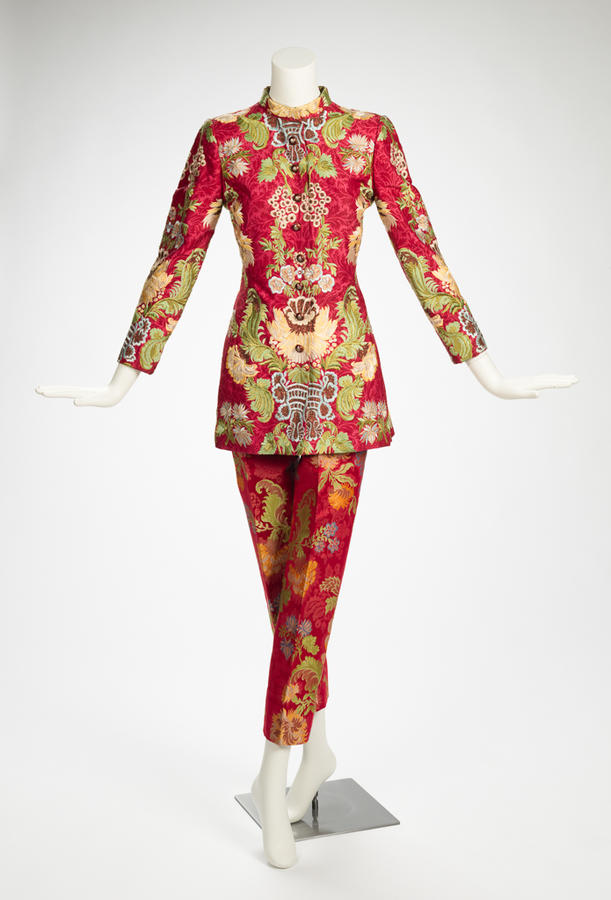
Late 1990s red brocade pantsuit

In 2014, the George W. Bush Presidential Center hosted an exhibit titled "Oscar de la Renta: Five Decades of Style" which shared the designer's creations for Mrs. Bush and America's First Ladies.

== Other enterprises ==
In 1977, de la Renta launched his fragrance, Oscar, followed by an accessories line in 2001 and a homewares line in 2002. The new business venture included 100 home furnishings for Century Furniture featuring dining tables, upholstered chairs, and couches. In 2004, he added a less expensive line of clothing called O Oscar.

In 2006, de la Renta designed Tortuga Bay, a boutique hotel at Puntacana Resort and Club.

== Awards, honors, and philanthropic endeavors ==
=== Design awards ===
In 1967 and 1968, de la Renta won the now-defunct Coty Award and in 1973 was inducted into the Coty Hall of Fame.

From 1973 to 1976, and from 1986 to 1988, he served as President of the CFDA. He is also a two-time winner of the American Fashion Critic's Award and was inducted into its hall of fame in 1973.

De la Renta's talents received continual international recognition. Among them, he received the Council of Fashion Designers Designer of the Year Award in 2000 and in 2007 (tied with Proenza Schouler). In February 1990, he was honored with the CFDA Lifetime Achievement Award. King Juan Carlos of Spain bestowed de la Renta with two awards, the Gold Medal of Bellas Artes and the La Gran Cruz de la Orden del Mérito Civil. He was recognized by the French government with the Légion d'honneur as a Commandeur.

=== Other awards ===
Oscar de la Renta was named to the International Best Dressed List Hall of Fame in 1973.

The Dominican Republic honored him with the Order of Merit of Duarte, Sánchez and Mella and the Order of Christopher Columbus. De la Renta founded the Casa del Niño orphanage in La Romana He contributed extensively in the construction of a much needed school near his home at the Punta Cana Resort and Club in Punta Cana.

De la Renta held dual citizenship in the Dominican Republic and the United States. He was an Ambassador-at-Large of the Dominican Republic.

De la Renta served as a board member of the Metropolitan Opera, the Morgan Library & Museum, Carnegie Hall and WNET. He served on the boards of several charitable institutions such as New Yorkers for Children, the America's Society. He was chairman of the Queen Sofía Spanish Institute. He received an honorary degree from Hamilton College on 26 May 2013.

In February 2014, Oscar de la Renta recreated his entire Spring presentation, Designed for A Cure 2014 collection, to raise money for the Sylvester Comprehensive Cancer Center at the Miller School of Medicine at the University of Miami.

=== Honors ===
In 1991, de la Renta was the recipient of the Golden Plate Award of the American Academy of Achievement. In 2014, de la Renta was the recipient of the Carnegie Hall Medal of Excellence. In 2017, de la Renta was featured by the United States Postal Service with an eleven stamp series.

== Personal life ==
In 1966, de la Renta became the third husband of Françoise de Langlade (1920–1983), an editor-in-chief of French Vogue who once worked for the fashion house of Elsa Schiaparelli. They were married until she died of cancer in 1983. After her death, de la Renta adopted a boy from the Dominican Republic and named him Moisés.

In 1990, the designer married Annette Engelhard (born 1939), daughter of Fritz Mannheimer and his wife Jane née Reiss, and adoptive daughter of her mother's second husband, Charles W. Engelhard, Jr. De la Renta had stepchildren from both marriages. His son-in-law Alex Bolen currently operates as chief executive officer, and stepdaughter Eliza Bolen serves as Vice President of Licensing at Oscar de la Renta, LLC.

De la Renta was regarded as an unofficial ambassador of the Dominican Republic, his home country, and held a diplomatic passport. He had homes there in Casa de Campo and Punta Cana, in addition to his residence in Kent, Connecticut.

== Later life and death ==
De la Renta was diagnosed with cancer in 2006. A year later at the CFDA "Fashion Talks" event, Executive Director Fern Mallis called him "The Sultan of Suave". At that event, he spoke of his cancer, saying:

Yes, I had cancer. Right now, I am totally clean. The only realities in life are that you are born, and that you die. We always think we are going to live forever. The dying aspect we will never accept. The one thing about having this kind of warning is how you appreciate every single day of life.

De la Renta died of complications from cancer on 20 October 2014, at his home in Kent, Connecticut, at the age of 82.

== See also ==
- List of people from the Dominican Republic
- List of fashion designers
