= Colao (film) =

- Theatrical release poster
- Directed by: Frank Perozo
- Written by: José Pastor; Jose Ramon Alama
- Produced by: José Ramón Alama
- Starring: Raymond Pozo; Miguel Céspedes; Manny Pérez; Nashla Bogaert
- Cinematography: Juan Carlos Gómez
- Edited by: Jose Delio Ares
- Music by: Sergio Jiménez Lacima
- Production companies: Bou Group; Caribbean Cinemas RD
- Distributed by: Spanglish Movies (International)
- Release dates: November 30, 2017 (Dominican Republic); December 7, 2017 (Puerto Rico); January 19, 2018 (United States)
- Running time: 88 minutes
- Country: Dominican Republic
- Language: Spanish

Colao is a 2017 Dominican romantic comedy film directed by Frank Perozo (in his directorial debut) and written by José Pastor & Jose Ramon Alama. Starring Raymond Pozo, Miguel Céspedes, Manny Pérez and Nashla Bogaert, accompanied by Anthony Alvarez, Evelyna Rodríguez, Celines Toribio, El Nene La Amenazzy and Austin Santos.

== Synopsis ==
Antonio, who has done nothing else in his life than grow coffee as he has been taught since he was young, is single and about to turn 40, and decides to turn his life around and open up new horizons in order to find the only thing that is missing in his life: love. He is accompanied by his two cousins from the capital, Felipe and Rafael, who help him not only to win Laura's heart but also to seek independence.

== Cast ==
The actors participating in this film are:

- Raymond Pozo as Rafael
- Miguel Céspedes as Felipe
- Manny Pérez as Antonio
- Nashla Bogaert as Laura
- Anthony Alvarez as Horacio
- Evelyna Rodríguez as Gina
- Celines Toribio as Maribel
- El Nene La Amenazzy as Jeicop
- Austin Santos as Santos
- Ana María Arias as Doña Margó
- Miguel Bucarelly as Don Arturo
- Chelsy Bautista as Estrellita
- Erick Hsu as Nishimura
- Gerardo Mercedes as Ciego
- Vladimir Martí as Taxi Driver
- Shailyn Sosa as Amarilis
- Danny Radhames Vasquez Castillo as Walkman
- Laura Leclerc as Hairdresser 1
- Sheara Mar Dotel as Hairdresser 2
- Aleja Flores as Hairdresser 3
- Candy Flow as Hairdresser 4

== Production ==
Principal photography began on June 14, 2017, and ended on July 12 of the same year, lasting 4 weeks at the Downtown Center shopping center, Zona Colonial, Jarabacoa and Avenida Venezuela in Santo Domingo Este.

== Release ==
It premiered on November 30, 2017, in Dominican theaters, to then premiere in Puerto Rico on December 7, 2017. It premiered on January 19, 2018, in American theaters.

== Reception ==
=== Box-office ===
In its first weekend in Dominican theaters, Colao sold 54,000 tickets becoming the highest grossing national film since 2015. It attracted 30,000 viewers in its first week in Puerto Rican theaters while in the Dominican Republic it reached 125,000 for its second week. 3 days after its premiere in the United States, it managed to raise $156,000.

=== Accolades ===
Year	Award / Festival	Category	Recipient	Result	Ref.
2018	Soberano Awards	Comedy of the year	José Ramón Alama	Won	
2018	Soberano Awards	Film director	Frank Perozo	Nominated	
2018	Soberano Awards	Actress of the year	Ana María Arias	Nominated	
2018	La Silla Awards	Best Comedy	Frank Perozo	Nominated	
2018	La Silla Awards	Best Leading Actress	Nashla Bogaert	Nominated	
2018	La Silla Awards	Best Musicalization	Sergio Jiménez Lacima	Nominated	
2018	La Silla Awards	Best Song	«Un beso»	Nominated	
2018	La Silla Awards	Best Costume	Ferdinando Erbetti	Nominated	
2018	Dominican Film Festival, Montreal	Audience Award	Colao	Won	

== Sequel ==
A sequel titled Colao 2 began recording on October 20, 2022, again directed by Frank Perozo and adding new actors and actresses to the cast, such as Karen Yaport, Fidia Peralta, Tiby Camacho, the Venezuelan actor Alejandro Nones, Nino Freestyle and Javis. It is scheduled to premiere on November 30, 2023, in Dominican theaters.
