= Akari Endo =

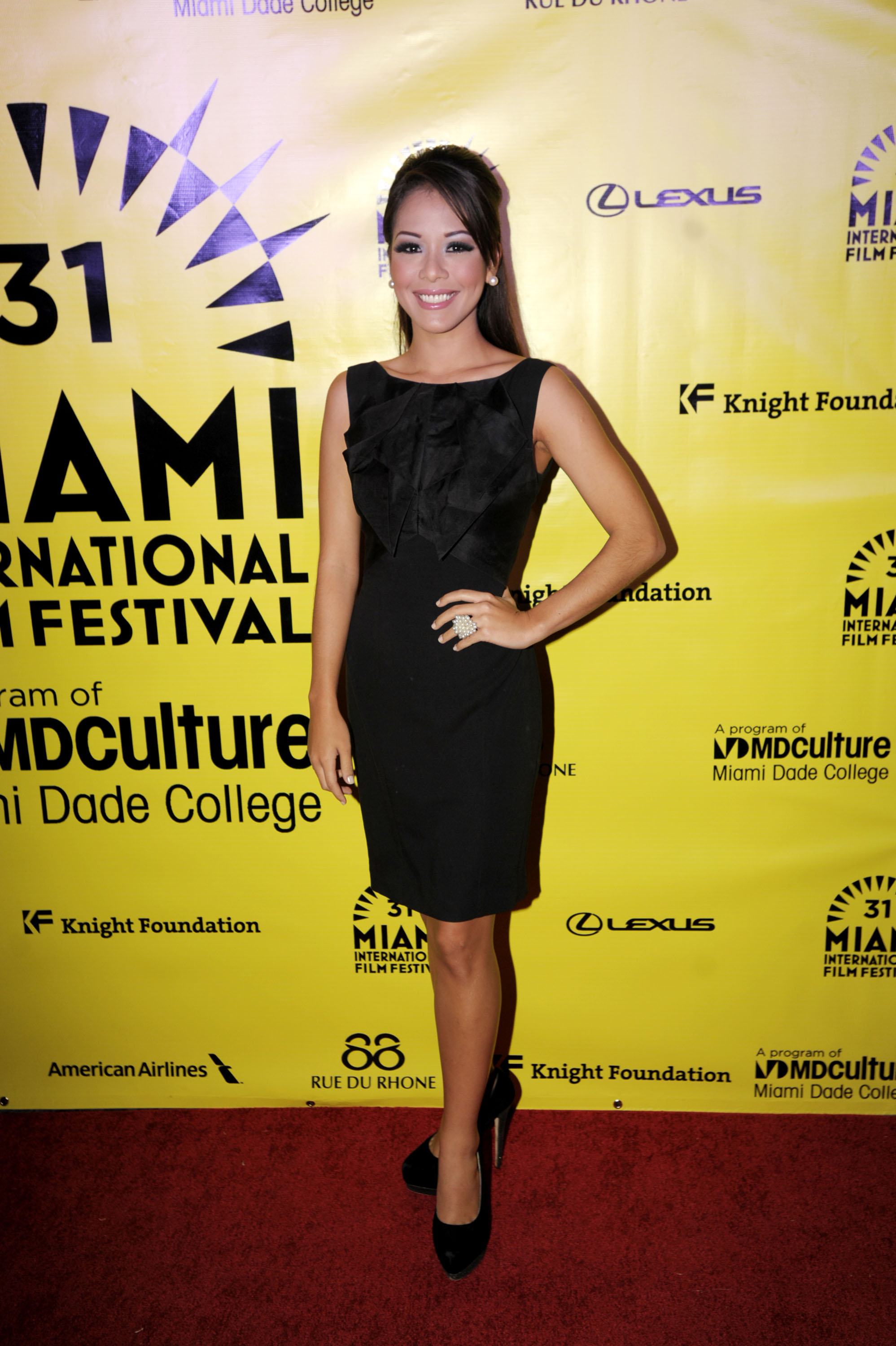
- Endo at the 2014 Miami International Film Festival
- Born: Akari Endo Sepúlveda; November 8, 1989 (age 36); Dominican Republic
- Occupation: Actress

Akari Endo Sepúlveda (born November 8, 1989) is a Dominican and Japanese actress. Her first major role was as a supporting actress in the film Who's the Boss? (2013), Spanish: "¿Quién Manda?" as Melissa, for which she received a nomination in La Silla Awards for Best Actress in a Supporting Role. In December 2013, she starred in the film Cristo Rey screened at the 2013 Toronto International Film Festival. Akari Endo and Casper Van Dien starred in the Syfy movie Sharktopus vs. Whalewolf, released in 2015.. Akari Endo and Cameron McKendry starred in the feature film An Accidental Zombie (Named Ted), released in 2018, which also starred Kane Hodder, Naomi Grossman and Gary Anthony Williams.

Akari Endo is also known for Musical Theatre performances in the Dominican Republic. She played the role of Gabriella Montez in High School Musical On Stage!, Kate in Annie, Bombalurina in CATS, Consuelo in West Side Story, La China in Esperanza (Musical based on Juan Luis Guerra songs), Alexi Darling in RENT and Mitchie Torres in Camp Rock. Her last major role in Musical Theatre was Elle Woods in Legally Blonde.
