= Palacio del Cine =

Former movie theater chain in Puerto Rico

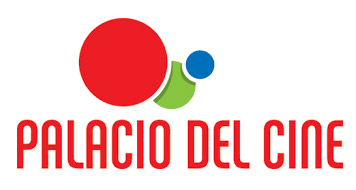
- Type: Theatre chain
- Founded: 1970s
- Defunct: April 26, 2024; 2 years ago
- Fate: Bankruptcy as a result of the COVID-19 pandemic
- Number of locations: 12
- Parent: Wometco Dominicana

Palacio del Cine was a movie theatre chain in the Dominican Republic founded in the 1970s. On April 26, 2024, after both the COVID-19 pandemic and rising popularity in streaming services caused attendance to decline, Caribbean Cinemas purchased all of its operational assets, becoming the only theatre chain in the country. Most of the theaters quietly ceased their services around that time.

== History ==
In 1970, under their own company Cinedom, newlywed entrepreneurs Gustavo Turull and Margarita Mayol de Turull founded “third-shift” movie theatres, located in the lowest social areas, which included Coloso, Marlboro, Montecarlo and Cinzano, in Santo Domingo. In 1976, they officially opened their very first movie theatre on Avenida 27 de Febrero. It had two theaters equipped with approximately 500 seats. By April 1986, they had acquired Wometco Dominicana, which owned the cinemas Naco, Triple, Doble and Plaza. On January 31, 2000, due to the sudden shift to modern shopping malls, the theatre shut down permanently, being later demolished in 2007 and replaced by a Banco Popular Dominicano branch.

In 2002, the Bella Vista Mall cinema opened, consisting of six theatres. It quickly became the premier meeting place for youth and families from the Bella Vista sector during the 2000s. After 18 years, the theatre closed on January 27, 2020.

In May 2008, the chain also arrived at the tourist area of the region, with its new branch opening in the Palma Real Shopping Village in Bávaro. Due to the center's closure in 2020 because of the COVID-19 pandemic, the theater closed as well.

On December 26, 2009, Palacio del Cine opened its doors to the public in Santiago de los Caballeros at Bella Terra Mall, becoming a major attraction on Juan Pablo Duarte avenue, serving during the 2010s as one of the official venues for international festivals and cultural events in the "Heart City". It closed in 2022 and was replaced by a Teleperformance call center.

On September 30, 2010, the Blue Mall Palacio del Cine was officially inaugurated. It introduced a concept of complete VIP lounges, including service buttons at the seats and the exclusive VIP Lounge with a high-end food and beverage menu. In July 2014, the venue presented its ever first IMAX format screen in the Dominican Republic, premiering with the movie Transformers: Age of Extinction. The theatre closed in January 2024.

On November 1, 2012, the Agora Mall cinema was officially opened. At the time of its opening, the establishment revolutionized the national film industry by introducing the country's first XD (Extreme Digital Cinema) theater, characterized by a giant floor-to-ceiling screen and a powerful surround sound system. It was closed in late 2023 and reopened as Caribbean Cinemas in July 1, 2026.

On December 19, 2012, the Sambil Santo Domingo complex was formally inaugurated with the premiere of Skyfall, immediately consolidating itself as the largest establishment with the highest volume of theaters in the entire chain.

On April 26, 2024, after almost 50 years operating, Wometco Dominicana sealed a deal with Palacio del Cine's historic longtime rival Caribbean Cinemas, selling all of its operational assets. Sambil was the last cinema that remained open before it closed around May 2024, and reopened a month later under Caribbean Cinemas.

== Locations ==
- Avenida 27 de Febrero (closed on January 31, 2000, demolished in 2007 and replaced by Banco Popular)
- Bella Vista Mall (closed on January 27, 2020)
- Malecon Center (closed in 2014)
- Avenida Venezuela in Santo Domingo Este (closed in 2019)
- Palma Real Shopping Village in Bávaro (closed in 2020 with the center)
- Bella Terra Mall in Santiago de los Caballeros (closed in 2022, replaced by a call center)
- Blue Mall (closed in January 2024)
- Agora Mall (closed in late 2023, reopened as Caribbean Cinemas)
- Occidental Mall (closed in 2024)
- Multiplaza Higüey in Higüey (closed, reopened as Caribbean Cinemas)
- Sambil Santo Domingo (closed in May 2024, reopened as Caribbean Cinemas)
- Palmares Mall in San Francisco de Macorís (closed, reopened as Caribbean Cinemas)
