= José María Cabral (director) =

Dominican film director and producer

José María Cabral González (b. Santo Domingo, July 24, 1988) is a film director, screenwriter, and producer from the Dominican Republic. He is considered one of the most important directors of the Dominican Republic. He has directed seven feature films. Cabral Gonzalez was the first Dominican filmmaker to be selected by the Sundance Film Festival with his movie ¨Woodpeckers¨. His documentary La 42 (42nd Street) is premiering in South by Southwest 2025.

== Early life and family ==
Cabral Gonzalez originally desired to be an actor. Consequently, he began filming short films in which he acted to be the main actor, Nevertheless, his work behind the camera caught his interest, then began his journey as a director.

He started financing his short films by having showings for each film in a movie theatre, renting the theatre for an hour, and selling tickets, to get a better budget for his next film.

Cabral began his career in the film industry at the very young age of 18 years old. He gained recognition for his ability to tackle complex social issues through his work, establishing himself as a leading figure in Dominican cinema, he was born into an upper-middle class family, he is defined by coherence, creativity, talent, social commitment, his aesthetic sense, social commitment and his adherence to a cinematographic art that illustrates, entertains and stimulates the dissemination of history that identifies us with the past., to José María Cabral Arzeno and Ingrid Josefina González Fiallo. He is related to many prominent Dominicans such as Oscar de la Renta, Viriato Fiallo, J. Antinoe Fiallo, and Fabio Fiallo, by his mother's side of the family; to Poppy Bermúdez and Carmen Imbert Brugal by his father's side; and he is also related to José María Cabral, Juan Bautista Vicini Cabral, Peggy Cabral, Donald Reid Cabral, from both sides of his family.

=== Ancestry ===
Ancestors of José María Cabral (director)

16. Marcos Antonio Cabral y Figueredo (1843–1903; uncle of #28); Baní
8. José María Cabral y Báez (1864–1937); Baní, Dominican Republic
17. Altagracia Amelia Báez Andújar (†1879; daughter of Ramón Buenaventura Báez Méndez)
4. Pedro Pablo Cabral Bermúdez (1916–1988)
18. Erasmo Bermúdez Jiménez (1825–1907); Venezuela, Gran Colombia
9. María Petronila Bermúdez Rochet (1872–1942)
19. María Petronila Rochet Gómez (1839–1889)
2. José María Cabral Arzeno (1959–)
20. Luis Sebastián Arzeno Abreu (1873–1922; great-grandson of José María Imbert du Plessis)
10. Luis Christian Arzeno Heinsen (1898–1969)
21. Christian Hilda Heinsen Pickwood (1876–1922); London, England, United Kingdom
5. Hilda Isabel Arzeno Brugal (1923–1997)
22. Andrés Pelegrín Clemente Brugal Montané (1850–1931); Sitges, Catalonia, Spain
11. Lucía Brugal Pérez (1901–1998); Puerto Plata, Dominican Republic
23. Lucía Pérez Pérez; El Caney, Santiago, Captaincy General of Cuba
1. José María Cabral González (born 1988)
24. Gen. Ignacio María González Santín (1840–1915; uncle of #27); Santo Domingo
12. José María González Roselló
25. Dolores Roselló Miret; Captaincy General of Puerto Rico
6. Francisco José González Machado (1927–)
26. Leoncio Machado Echavarría (†1910)
13. Altagracia Alicia Machado Sánchez
27. Francisca Sánchez González (niece of #24)
3. Ingrid Josefina González Fiallo (1960–)
28. Dr. Luis Arístides Fiallo Cabral (1876–1931; nephew of #16); Santo Domingo
14. Hostos Fiallo Henríquez (1903–1988)
29. Flor de María Gregoria Henríquez García (†1963; daughter of Federico Henríquez y Carvajal)
7. Sonia Antonia Fiallo Oliva (1932–)
30. Gen. José Oliva Currari (1870–?); Santa Domenica Talao, Italy
15. Gracita Oliva García
31. Elisa García (1882–1967)

Sources:
- Larrazábal Blanco, Carlos. Familias Dominicanas (in Spanish). Santo Domingo: Academia Dominicana de la Historia.

== Career ==
Cabral started making films when he was 16 years old, making private screenings of short films to family and friends in local movie theaters, one of them, "Excexos", got national distribution in 2008. His first feature film, Jaque Mate (2011), was screened at a high number of film festivals and selected as the Dominican entry for the Best Foreign Language Oscar at the 85th Academy Awards, but it did not make the final shortlist. "Arrobá" and "Despertar" followed in 2013 and 2014, also making it into the festival circuits. In 2015 he released "Detective Willy" a comedy adventure film. Cabral premiered "Carpinteros" in January at the 2017 Sundance Film Festival, a story about the realities and relationships of prisoners in Dominican jails.

In 2022 he premiered Perejil, winning the Miami Film Festival Audience Award. In 2025 his documentary La 42 (42nd Street) is premiering in South by Southwest 2025.

== Filmography ==
- Excess, 2008
- Jaque Mate, 2012
- Arrobá, 2013
- Despertar, 2014
- Detective Willy, 2015
- Carpinteros, 2017
- El Proyeccionista, 2019
- Isla de Plástico, 2020
- Hotel Coppelia, 2021
- Perejil, 2022
- Tiger, 2024
- La 42, 2025

== Carpinteros / Woodpeckers ==
Screened in the World Cinema Dramatic Competition section of the 2017 Sundance Film Festival, Woodpeckers was the first Dominican feature film selected by Sundance.

Synopsis Julián finds love and a reason for living in the last place imaginable: the Dominican Republic's Najayo Prison. His romance, with fellow prisoner Yanelly, must develop through sign language and without the knowledge of dozens of guards.

The film has been selected by other festivals:

- Guadalajara Film Festival, 2017
- Miami Film Festival, 2017
- Havana Film Festival New York, 2017 - Winner of Havana Star Prize for Best Director
