= Emma Colao =

Spanish jurist, politician, and activist (born 1995)

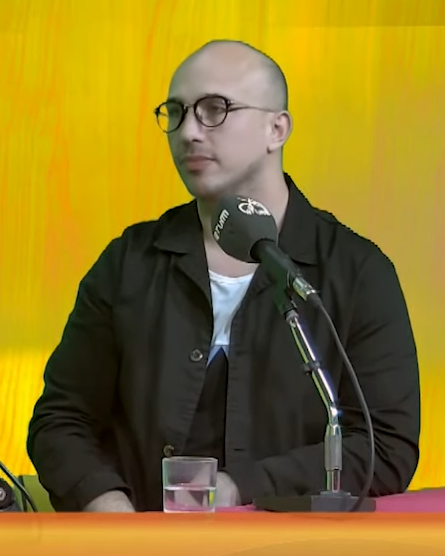
- Born: Emma Colao Corujo; 1995 (age 29–30); Agüimes, Canary Islands, Spain
- Occupation(s): Jurist, politician, and activist.

Emma Colao Corujo (born 1995 in Agüimes, Canary Islands, Spain) is a Spanish jurist, politician, and activist advocating for social justice, social rights, dependency care in the Canary Islands, and LGBT rights.

== Career ==
Emma Colao holds a degree in law.

Throughout her career, Emma has worked as a legal advisor for at least 180 social organizations in the Canary Islands and has specialized in training the National Police, Civil Guard, and local police forces on hate crimes.

In 2019, she founded the first LGBT+ feminist association (EQUAL LGTBI+) in the southeast and south of Gran Canaria, publicly coming out about her gender identity.

In 2020, she joined the federation of social services collaborative entities (Social Action Coordinator of the Canary Islands), where she served as secretary and spokesperson until being elected president in 2021.

During her tenure as federation president, she established in 2022 the first Platform for the Defense of Social Rights in the Canary Islands, unifying for the first time in Canary Islands history the Professional Associations of Social Work, Psychology, and Social Education along with the Third Sector of Social Action.

In 2023, she ran as a candidate in the Canary Islands regional elections on May 28 for the Reunir Canarias Sostenible coalition, becoming the first transgender person in Spain to achieve this milestone.

Through talks, interventions, and her activism, she has exposed the significant labor, economic, and psychosocial precarity faced by transgender people in Spain, as well as the hypocrisy of public organizations regarding LGBT struggles and how some companies have attempted to hire transgender people to obtain disability certificates, thus identifying transgender people as disabled.

She currently serves as director of the Observatory of Social Rights of the Canary Islands and manager of ACUFADE, the leading organization in the Canary Islands for the care and advocacy of dependent persons.
