= Cuarencena =

- Theatrical release poster
- Directed by: David Maler
- Written by: David Maler
- Produced by: Nashla Bogaert; Rafael Elias Munoz
- Starring: Frank Perozo; Nashla Bogaert; Luis José Germán; Elizabeth Chahín
- Cinematography: Luis Enrique Carrión
- Edited by: Pablo Chea; Israel Cárdenas
- Music by: John Benitez
- Production companies: Cacique Films; Lantica Media
- Release date: March 16, 2023
- Running time: 115 minutes
- Country: Dominican Republic
- Language: Spanish

Cuarencena (lit. 'Quarandinner') is a 2023 Dominican black comedy-drama film written and directed by David Maler. Starring Frank Perozo, Nashla Bogaert, Luis José Germán and Elizabeth Chahín. It premiered on March 16, 2023, in Dominican theaters.

It was selected as the Dominican entry for the Best International Feature Film at the 96th Academy Awards and for the Best Ibero-American Film at the 38th Goya Awards.

== Synopsis ==
A chef and his wife host a soiree in their luxurious colonial apartment despite a nationwide curfew. 7 friends, under quarantine, who will not be able to leave until the curfew is lifted the next morning.

== Cast ==
The actors participating in this film are:

- Frank Perozo as El Chompi
- Nashla Bogaert as Carmen
- Luis José Germán as Mateo
- Elizabeth Chahín as Aurora
- Richarson Díaz as Jorge
- Freddy Ginebra as Father
- Soraya Pina as Claudia
- Isabel Spencer as Joana 'Jojo'
- Joshua Wagner as Jonás

== Production ==
Principal photography began in December 2020 at the facilities of the Pinewood Dominican Republic Studios.
