= Cristo Rey (film) =

2013 film

- Film poster
- Directed by: Leticia Tonos
- Written by: Leticia Tonos; Alejandro Andújar
- Starring: Akari Endo
- Cinematography: Chicca Ungaro
- Release date: 10 September 2013 (TIFF)
- Running time: 96 minutes
- Country: Dominican Republic
- Language: Spanish

Cristo Rey is a 2013 Dominican Republic drama film written and directed by Leticia Tonos. It was screened in the Contemporary World Cinema section at the 2013 Toronto International Film Festival. It was selected as the Dominican entry for the Best Foreign Language Film at the 87th Academy Awards, but was not nominated.

== Plot ==
Haitians and Dominicans are living in the Santo Domingo slums, where the two groups are at violent odds in a turbulent political and social climate. Janvier and Rudy are half-brothers who are fighting for the love of the same woman. Because of his Haitian roots, Janvier is recruited by the drug trafficking gang that rules the Cristo Rey barrio. He is assigned the job of looking after the gang leader's sister, Jocelyn. Rudy, who is Dominican, used to be in a relationship with Jocelyn, and cannot abide the thought of Janvier spending time with her. He becomes determined to get her back, no matter the cost. Jocelyn and Janvier end up falling in love, and must devise a plan to escape Cristo Rey, where no future for the two of them seems possible.

== Cast ==
- Akari Endo
- Yasser Michelén
- James Saintil

== See also ==
- List of submissions to the 87th Academy Awards for Best Foreign Language Film
- List of Dominican submissions for the Academy Award for Best Foreign Language Film
