= Sharlene Taulé =

Dominican singer

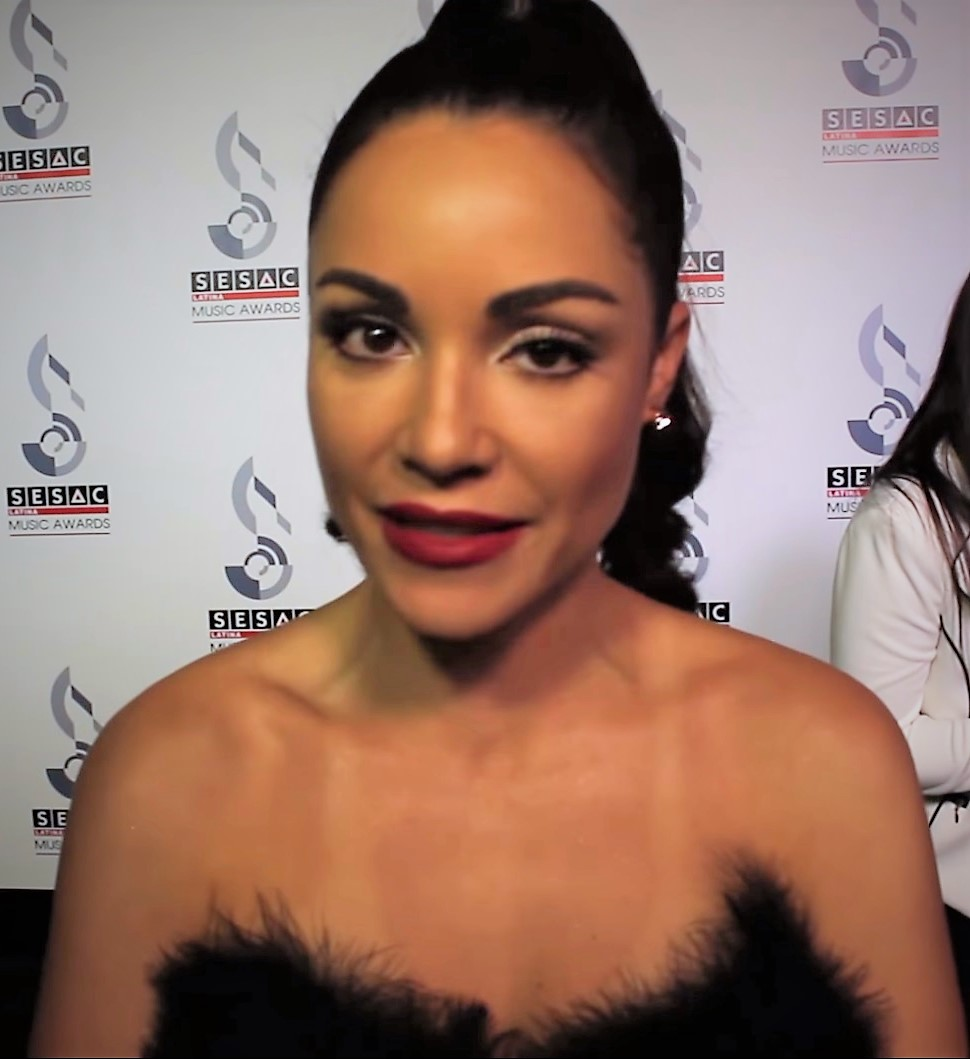
- Sharlene Taulé

Background information
- Also known as: Sharlene
- Born: Sharlene Taulé Ponciano; Santo Domingo, Dominican Republic
- Occupations: Singer; actress

Sharlene Taulé Ponciano, better known as Sharlene, is a Dominican singer and actress.

== Early life ==
Taulé studied singing with María Remola and Nadia Nicola, and performed in New York at the Lee Strasberg Theatre and Film Institute.

== Career ==
Her filmography includes the films Los locos también piensan, La fiesta del chivo, Viajeros, Yuniol, Tropic of Blood, La Roja, Flucht Aus Santo Domingo and Code 666, which earned her a Soberano Award nomination for Best Actress in a Film. She appeared in the musicals Evita, Les Misérables, Fiddler on the Roof, Hairspray, Cinderella and the theatrical production of The Graduate. Her television credits include the music video for Bendita tu luz by Maná and Juan Luis Guerra, Hispaniola, a short film for HBO, several episodes of the German series Leipzig Homicide and the telenovelas Trópico and Condesa por Amor. She has also been a presenter on Corporación Estatal de Radio y Televisión's SantoDomingo Invita, and the VIP Television, and El Fan Club programs. Taulé has been an announcer on the Punto y Seguido and Cambio y Fuera programs.

In 2011, Taulé played Katty in the original Nickelodeon Latin American series Grachi, which was very successful by then. She also had the opportunity to demonstrate her talent as a singer in a musical, Grachi:El Show en Vivo, and toured much of Latin America.

She was cast in 2013 as Camila Barrera, the youthful protagonist of Telemundo's telenovela, Pasión prohibida. It starred Mónica Spear and Jencarlos Canela, and featured performances by Rebecca Jones, Roberto Vander and Mercedes Molto.

She released her first single "Vives En Mi" and then "Mal de Amor" in 2014 with Servando & Florentino, the brothers Primera and Florentino Servando. This video has more than 10 million views on her YouTube channel and reached the top position on the Billboard Tropical Songs chart and the Venezuelan Record Report chart.

Taulé played Angie in the movie Bravetown, released in May 2015. She released another single that year, "Aqui Nadie Toca", which featured Dominican urban singer Mozart la Para. It was nominated for a Videoclip Award and already has more than 3 million views.

In 2017, Taule played a regular role of Eva in season one Star.

Taule has collaborated with Don Omar in La Fila.

She was nominated for Heat Latin Music Awards.

== Filmography ==
Year	Film or TV series	Role	Network
2020	Deputy	Rose	Fox
2018	Nicky Jam “El Ganador”	Casandra	Netflix
2016-2017	Star	Eva	Fox
2015	Bravetown	Angie	
2013	Pasión prohibida	Camila Barrera	
2011-2013	Grachi	Kathiusca "Katty"	Nickelodeon
2011	Jaque mate!		
2010	Trópico de sangre	Maria Teresa Mirabal	
2009	La soga		
2008	Leipzig Homicide: Emanuela		
2008	Condesa por amor		
2007	Trópico		
2007	Hispaniola		
2007	Yuniol		
2006	Leipzig Homicide: Flucht aus Santo Domingo		
2006	La fiesta del chivo		
2006	La tragedia llenas: Un código 666		
2006	Viajeros		
2005	The Feast of the Goat		
2005	Los locos también piensan	Hija del Coronel	

== Theater ==
- Evita
- El violinista en el tejado
- Les Miserables
- Hairspray
- La cenicienta
- El graduado
- Baño de damas
- es:Grachi: El show en vivo

== Music ==
- Aerofobia
- Quien dijo miedo con Mike Bahia
- San Pedro con Zion & Lennox
- El vecino con Lalo Ebratt
- Yo pago lo mío
- Me Siento Bien con Fuego
- La Fila con Don Omar & Maluma
- Encanto con Don Omar
- La Cadera con La melodia Perfecta & Mozart La Para
- Aquí Nadie Toca con Mozart La Para
- Mal De Amor con Servando & Florentino
- Toy Enamorao con Nacho y Mozart La Para
