= Viriato Fiallo =

Dominican physician and politician

Unión Cívica Nacional candidate for President of the Dominican Republic
- Election date 20 December 1962
- Opponent: Juan Bosch
- Incumbent: Rafael F. Bonnelly

Personal details
- Born: Viriato Alberto Fiallo Rodríguez; October 28, 1895 Azua de Compostela, Azua Province, Dominican Republic
- Died: October 4, 1983 (aged 87) Santo Domingo, Distrito Nacional, Dominican Republic
- Party: Unión Cívica Nacional
- Spouse: Prudencia Fiallo Lluberes
- Relations: Fabio Fiallo (uncle and father-in-law); Luis Fiallo (uncle); Oscar de la Renta (half-cousin); José María Cabral y Báez (first cousin-once removed); José María Cabral Bermúdez (first cousin-twice removed); Manuel del Cabral (second cousin); Marcos Cabral (grand-uncle); Larimar Fiallo (grand-niece); Donald Reid Cabral (second cousin-once removed); Peggy Cabral (second cousin-once removed); José María Cabral (director) (double first cousin-thrice removed)
- Children: José Rafael Arístides Fiallo Fiallo; Fabio Alberto Fiallo Fiallo
- Parent(s): Alberto Fiallo Cabral (father); Ramona Rodríguez Germes
- Profession: Physician

Viriato Alberto Fiallo Rodríguez (28 October 1895 – 4 October 1983) was a Dominican physician and politician.

== Life ==
Viriato Fiallo was the son of Alberto Fiallo Cabral and Ramona Rodríguez Germes (daughter of Fidel Rodríguez Urdaneta, a member of the junta that came to power in 1876). In 1920 he married his cousin Prudencia Fiallo Lluberes (daughter of his uncle, the poet Fabio Fiallo Cabral), with whom he had two children: Fabio Alberto & Rafael Arístides Fiallo Fiallo. He was a cousin of the fashion designer Óscar de la Renta Fiallo.

Viriato Fiallo emerged as a leader amongst those opposing the tyranny of Trujillo and Fiallo was exalted by their struggles and pristine behavior. Before, he had been known superficially. He had been a physician in the mills of the Vicini family and had chaired the Dominican-German Committee.

Fiallo was jailed several times for being an outspoken opponent of the regime of Trujillo, following the death of dictator he founded the National Civic Union (UCN), as a nonpartisan movement whose main objective movement was the oust of the Trujillo family and their associates, converting later the UCN movement into a political party with a view to the presidential elections of 1962. He participates as a candidate for the Presidency of the Republic, in a campaign without precedent in the country in which the masses of the country turned to political activism.
