= Leticia Tonos =

Dominican Republic film director

Leticia Tonos Paniagua is a Dominican director, producer and screenwriter born in Santo Domingo. She graduated in Advertising in 1992 from APEC University. She obtained a master's degree in Audiovisual Communications at the International University of Andalucía, Spain (1997). She graduated from The London Film School in 2001, specializing in film directing. She is a pioneer in the area of film co-productions in her country, having made co-productions with Spain, France, Puerto Rico, Haiti, among others. She is co-founder of ADOCINE (Dominican Association of Professionals in the Film Industry).

During the start of her career, she excelled in producing television commercials and feature films for national and international companies such as Vega Film (Switzerland), CineSon (Los Angeles), Forti Lane (Miami), Les Films de l'Astre (France), Amuse Inc. (Tokyo), among others. Her short film "Ysrael", based on a story by Junot Díaz, was well-received internationally.

Leticia Tonos has been an active member of the Dominican Film Industry, producing several films including "Perico Ripiao", one of the most successful Dominican Films to date. She is one of the founders of ADOCINE (Dominican Association of Professionals in the Film Industry, Inc.). Her first feature film, Love Child (2011), won the Audience Choice Award at the 27th Chicago Latino Film Festival and was the Dominican Republic's official entry in the category of Best Foreign Film at the 84th Annual Academy Awards.

Her second film Cristo Rey (2013) was Official Selection at the Toronto International Film Festival. Her fourth film "Juanita" 2018 participated in festivals such as HBO New York Latino Film Festival and Miami International Film Festival, her fifth film A State of Madness (2020) winner of best film at the Peachtree Village International Film Festival in 2020, became her third film to represent the Dominican Republic at the Oscars.

As a producer she has on her slate Jupia (2022), a horror / dark fantasy film based on the Taino legends of the Caribbean region.

In 2020 she was awarded the Medal of Cinematographic Merit, becoming the first woman to receive such distinction. Her work has been characterized as a constant exploration of the Caribbean identity within the Latino context and in her firm belief in the potential that these stories have to have a global impact.

She is currently the President of her Production Company "Linea Espiral".

== Selected filmography ==
“La Hija Natural” / “Love Child” (2011) Audience Choice Award 27th Chicago Latino Film Festival Best Fiction Film San José Intl. Film Festival Audience Choice Award 4º Global Film Festival Official Selection Shanghai Intl. Film Festival Official Selection HBO Latino Film Festival Best Director Casandra Awards DR's Official Representative Oscars® 2012

“Cristo Rey” (2013) Official Selection Toronto Intl. Film Festival Official Selection Miami Intl. Film Festival Opening Night Film Trinidad Intl. Film Festival DR's Official Representative Oscars® 2014

“Juanita” (2018) Official Selection Miami Intl. Film Festival Official Selection HBO NY Latino Film Festival Best Director La Silla Awards Best Production Design La Silla

“Mis 500 Locos” / “A State of Madness” (2020) Best Feature Peachtree Intl. Film Festival Official Selection HBO NY Latino Film Festival Opening Night Film Santander Intl. Film Festival DR's Official Representative Oscars® 2021

"Aire: Just Breathe" (2024)
