= Agliberto Meléndez =

Dominican film director (1942–2025)

- Born: August 8, 1942; Altamira, Dominican Republic
- Died: July 2, 2025 (aged 82)
- Education: Ohio State University (Economics), Hunter College (Film)
- Occupations: Film director, producer, screenwriter

Agliberto Meléndez (August 8, 1942 – July 2, 2025) was a Dominican film director best known as the director of A One-Way Ticket (Un Pasaje de Ida), the Dominican Republic's first feature-length film, produced entirely in the Dominican Republic by a Dominican cast and crew. The film became known to American audiences after its 1988 debut in New York City at the Museum of Modern Art's New Directors/New Films Festival. A One-Way Ticket gained some notoriety because of its macabre subject matter; the story of would-be immigrants who die in their desperate struggle to escape a fate of poverty and despair.

== Life and career ==
Meléndez was born on August 8, 1942. In 1979, Agliberto Meléndez founded the Cinemateca Nacional, quickly becoming the meeting place for like-minded film enthusiasts. He led the Cinemateca Nacional until it was finally forced to close its doors in 1986 following the election of right-wing candidate Joaquín Balaguer. His second and last feature film: "Del Color de la Noche" based on the life of José Francisco Peña Gómez premiered in the Dominican Republic in 2015.
