= Veneno =

Veneno (Spanish for "venom") or La Veneno may refer to:

- Lamborghini Veneno, a supercar
- Veneno (wrestler), Panamanian professional wrestler
- Jack Veneno, Dominican professional wrestler and politician
  - Veneno (film), a 2018 biographical film about the wrestler
- La Veneno, Spanish transgender vedette, singer and actress
  - Veneno (TV series), a 2020 biographical TV series about La Veneno
- Kiko Veneno, Spanish musician
  - Veneno, his debut album
- Veneno (album), an album by Brazilian band Banda Uó
- Veneno, a 2015 album by Duelo
- "Veneno" (song), 2018 song by Anitta
- "Veneno", a song by Álvaro Soler from Mar de colores
- "Veneno", a song by Jesse & Joy from ¿Con Quién Se Queda El Perro?, 2011
- "Veneno", a song by Juanes from Vida Cotidiana, 2023
- Venenosaurus, a dinosaur found in North America
