= Luichy Guzman =

Dominican composer and singer-songwriter (born 1974)

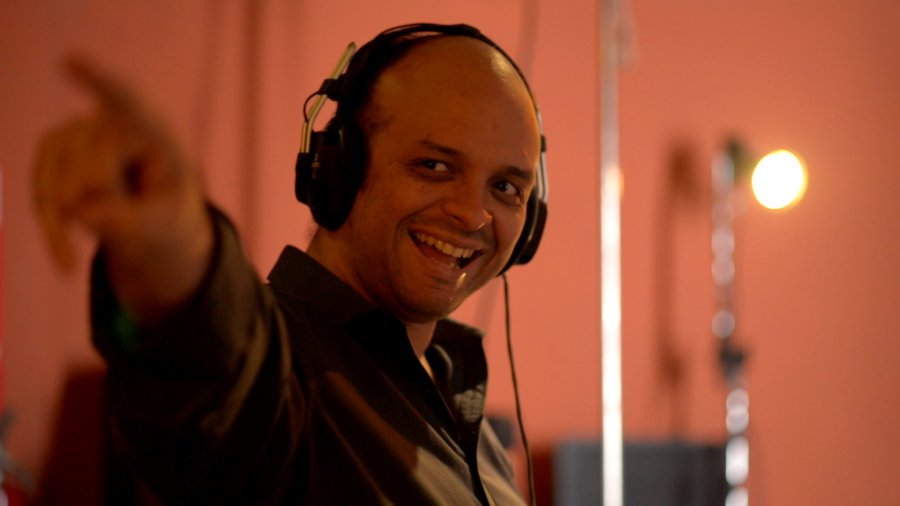
- Luichy Guzman in 2013

Background information
- Also known as: Luichy
- Born: Luis Alberto Guzmán Peña; 22 July 1974 (age 52); Santo Domingo, Dominican Republic
- Genre: Film score
- Occupations: Composer, singer-songwriter
- Instruments: Guitar, keyboard, piano
- Years active: 1990–present
- Website: luichyguzman.com

Luis Alberto Guzmán (Spanish pronunciation: [lujs ˈalβeɾto ɣusˈman]; born 22 July 1974) is a Dominican composer and singer-songwriter. He has composed the music for the films Quiero ser fiel, Ladrones and Veneno: Primera caída – El relámpago de Jack, for which he won the Premio La Silla in 2018.

In 2009, Guzman received an award for producing the stage musical Les Misérables from the Asociacion de Cronistas de Arte de Santo Domingo.

== Early life and family ==
Luis Alberto Guzmán was born on 22 July 1974 in Santo Domingo, Dominican Republic to Josefina (née Peña) and Luis Guzmán Molina a musician. As a young child, he played the keyboard at home but never had piano lessons.

His father is a legendary Dominican rocker, and with his help and the help of his aunt he learned to play the guitar at the age of 12.

Luichy attended Colegio Dominicano De La Salle, graduating in 1993.

Guzmán has two brothers, Luis Eduardo and Luis Omar, and one sister, Ayerine.

== Career ==
=== Early career ===
Guzman began his career playing guitar and singing in the late 1980s with the band Razon Vital. After that he went through various local bands either as a backup singer or as a guitar player.

After a stint at being an actor in various musicals he released his first album, Contracorriente in 2004. Later on he wrote many advertising jingles.

=== Film scoring ===
A turning point in Guzman's career occurred with the 2014 film Quiero ser fiel. American director Joe Menendez was looking for someone to score Quiero ser fiel, and the producer knew Guzman from a mutual friend and asked him to do a demo. Menendez was impressed by Guzman's work and hired him to score Quiero ser fiel.

A year after Quiero ser fiel, Guzman was asked to compose the score for Joe Menendez's Ladrones. Ladrones’ instrumentation consisted mostly of synthesizers, samplers and guitars played by Guzman. It also used live musicians for the strings and the brass sections.

Guzman was approached to compose the score for the 2018 film Veneno: Primera caída – El relámpago de Jack. Guzman won a Premio La Silla for Best Original Score.

== Personal life ==
Guzman has a son from his first marriage named Gustavo Alberto.

Guzman lives in Santo Domingo with his second wife, singer/actress Carolina Rivas, with whom he has an additional two children.

== Awards ==
Premios Casandra

- 2009: Les Misérables (Best Musical) (as producer)

Premios La Silla

- 2018: Veneno: Primera caída – El relámpago de Jack (Best Original Score)

== Albums ==
=== Studio albums ===
Title	Release date	Label	Format
Contracorriente	2 October 2004	Estudio 828	CD, digital download
