= Vuelve temprano =

Vuelve temprano may refer to:

- Vuelve temprano (Chilean TV series), 2014
- Vuelve temprano (Mexican TV series), 2016
