= Miss Bala =

Miss Bala may refer to:

- Miss Bala (2011 film), a Mexican crime drama
- Miss Bala (2019 film), an American thriller based on the 2011 film
