= Oscar Torre =

American actor

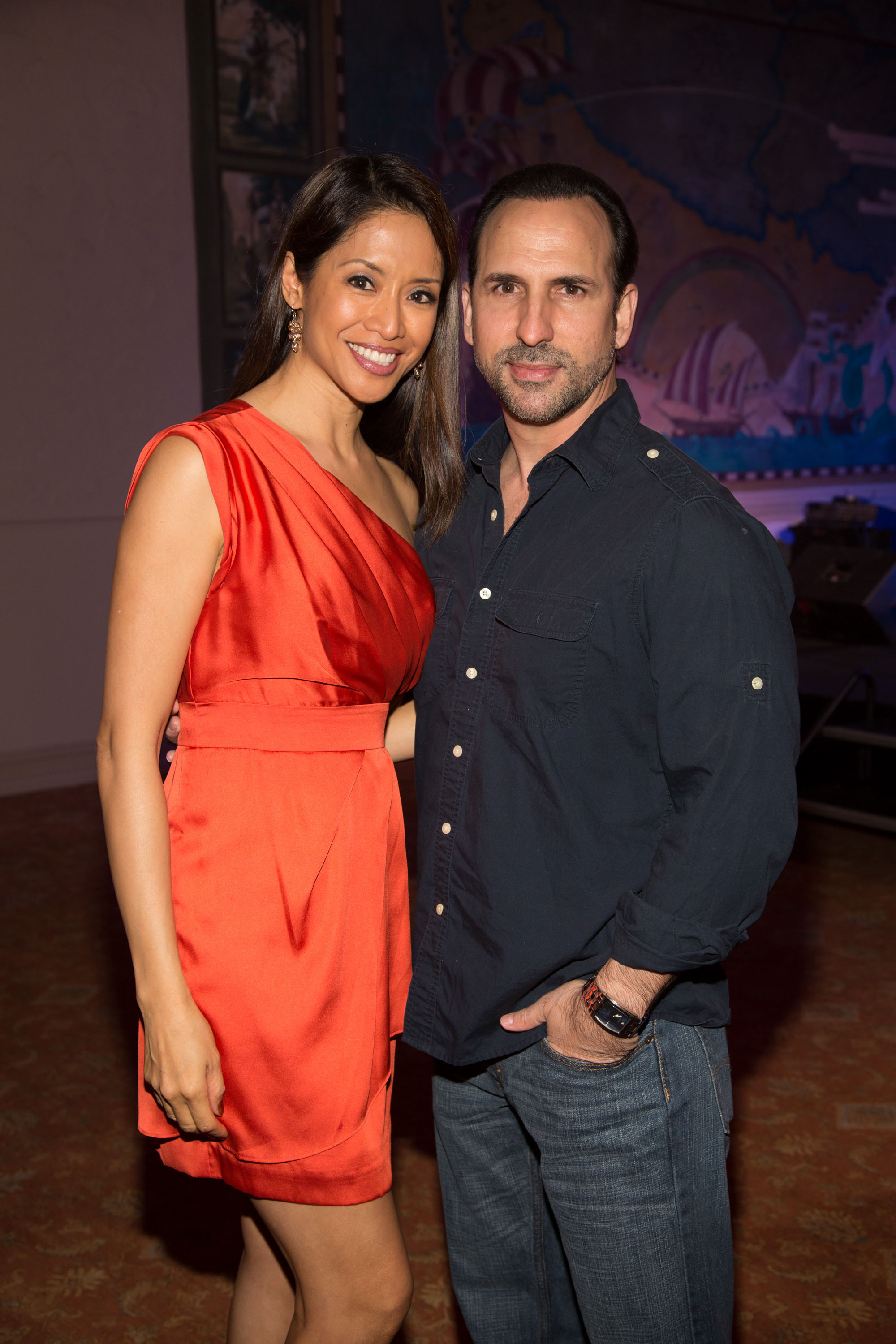
- Born: January 11, 1969 (age 57); Miami, Florida, U.S.
- Occupations: Actor, Producer & Director
- Years active: 1990–present
- Spouse: Chuti Tiu

Oscar Torre is an American actor, film director, and producer.

== Personal life ==
He was born in Miami, Florida, to Cuban-born parents, who immigrated to the United States as teenagers. Torre's wife is Chuti Tiu.

== Career ==
Torre is known for the role of Santo in the CBS TV series Cane, as one of the leads (Miguelito) in the LIONSGATE film To Rob a Thief (Spanish: Ladrón que Roba a Ladrón), and The Hangover Part III. In 2014, in addition to acting and producing, Torre debuted as director of the award winning Pretty Rosebud, which starred his wife Chuti Tiu.

In 2018, He played mob boss Vinny Malone on Tyler Perry's The Haves and the Have Nots

Torre recent starred in the Julie Roberts - Sean Penn lead Emmy Nominated series Gastlit

== Filmography ==
Year	Film	Role	Notes
1990	Miami Shakedown	Det. Martin	
1998	The Versace Murder	Antonio D'Amico	
1999	Suicide Blonde	Roco Navaja	
2003	Hunting of Man	Rex Simones	
2004	Larceny	Lawyer / Gang Leader	
2007	Ladrón que roba a ladrón	Miguelito	
2009	For a Fistful of Diamonds	Tony	
2009	GB: 2525	El Santo	
2009	Cold Case	Juan de la Cruz	
2010	Legacy	Hector Cruz	
2011	Joshua Tree	Rob	
2011	Magic City Memoirs	Manuel De La Cruz	
2012	Unknowns	El Socio	
2013	Eenie Meenie Miney Moe	Jimmy	
2013	The Hangover Part III	Officer Vasquez	
2014	Counterpunch	Uncle Frank	
2014	Pretty Rosebud	Alejandro	Director, Producer.
2015	Ladrones	Miguelito	
2015	The Boatman	Miguel	
2016	The Mentalist	Cruz	Season 6 Episode 17
2016	SinVerguenzas	Jabali	
2016	Legends of the Hidden Temple	Crew Leader	
2016	Stage Kiss	Loco	post-production
2016	Diverted Eden	Captain Tom Pennfield	post-production
2018–2021	Tyler Perry's The Haves and the Have Nots	Vinny Malone	Recurring role
2018	Myra	Manny Rosas	
2018	Nightclub Secrets	Lolo	Originally titled Bottle Girl.
2022	Gaslit	Virgilio Gonzalez	
