= Paulette Hernández =

Mexican actress

- Born: 25 January 1991 (age 35); Mexico City, Mexico
- Occupation: Actress
- Years active: 2009-present

Paulette Hernández (born 25 January 1991) is a Mexican actress. She is known for appearing in various plays, films and television series such as A corazón abierto (2011), Destino (2013-2014), Cuna de lobos (2019), Purasangre (2016), Perdida (2019) and Saw X (2023).

== Filmography ==
=== Film ===
Year	Title	Role
2015	El cumple de la abuela	Susana
2015	Saudade	Sylvia
2015	Sopladora de hojas	
2016	Purasangre	Camila
2016	Forward	Laura
2016	Vive por mí	Lucía
2016	Tus feromonas me matan	Andrea
2017	Mis demonios nunca juraron soledad	Deina
2017	Mía	Romelia
2018	Lo que podríamos ser	La Güera
2018	A ti te quería encontrar	Julia
2019	Locos por la herencia	Andrea Cortes
2019	Perdida	Julia
2020	Duele Tanto Amelia ft. Madison	Paulette
2021	Guerra de Likes	Ana Karen
2021	El Rey de la Fiesta	Nicole
2022	Solo respira	Lourdes
2023	Saw X	Valentina

=== Television ===
Year	Title	Role
2009	Lo que callamos las mujeres	Ana Paula Solís Mendoza
2010	Entre el amor y el deseo	Mónica
2011	Bajo el alma	Carlota Quiroz
2011	A corazón abierto	Clara
2012	Pacientes	Corina
2014	Las Bravo	Adriana Bravo
2013-2014	Destino	Pamela Urdaneta Ramos
2015	Paramédicos	Clara
2016	La habitación	Joven Ángela
2017	Érase una vez	Patricia
2018	Demencia	
2019	Sitiados: México	Tania
2019	Cuna de Lobos	Leonora Navarro
2021	La venganza de las Juanas	Isabel Cárdenas
2022	Búnker	Eleonora Smith
2022	Todo por Lucy	Rebeca
2022	Corona de lágrimas	Roxana
2024	Fugitivas, en busca de la libertad	Florencia Márquez
