= Mauricio Martínez (actor) =

Mexican actor and singer

- Born: Mauricio Martinez
- Occupations: Actor, Singer, Broadway Performer
- Years active: 2000–present
- Known for: Broadway Musicals, Mexican telenovelas and concerts

Mauricio Martínez is a Mexican actor and singer best known for participating in the Broadway musical On Your Feet!, in the Emmy Winning TV Show El Vato NBC, the hit Señora Acero Telemundo and several Mexican telenovelas.

== Personal life ==
In 2010, Mauricio was diagnosed with bladder cancer and has had 3 recurrences until 2018. In 2014, the actor confirmed to be gay and was married to Mexican publicist Emilio Solís from 2013 up until their divorce in 2015. He currently lives in New York City.

== Music ==
In 2024, Martínez released his first live album, "Live in NYC." The album is produced by Martínez and Robbie Rozelle. It was recorded at 54 Below and features arrangements by Brian J. Nash.

== Filmography ==
=== Broadway ===
Year	Title	Role	Notes
2017/2018	On Your Feet!	Emilio Estefan	Broadway and National tour

=== Films ===
Year	Title	Role	Notes
2000	Birthday Time	Kissing Man 2	Short film
2007	Species IV: El despertar	Dalton	
2012	Cuestión de Corbatas	Julio	Short film
2015	Xibalba	Jorge	

=== Television ===
Year	Title	Role	Notes
2002	Operación triunfo	Himself	
2003	Clap, el lugar de tus sueños	Emiliano	
2006	Mujer, casos de la vida real	Various roles	"Vestido de novia: Implacable destino" (Season 23, Episode 23); "Vestido de novia: En el último momento" (Season 23, Episode 24); "Vestido de novia: Comunión de amor" (Season 23, Episode 25)
2009	Atrévete a soñar		"Con quién" (Season 1, Episode 114)
2012–2013	La mujer del Vendaval	Mike	Recurring role
2013	Nueva vida		"Voy a ser madre" (Season 1, Episode 2)
2012–2015	Como dice el dicho	Claudio / Raúl	"El amor que se hace nudo" (Season 2, Episode 9); "Más vale buena esperanza" (Season 5, Episode 25)
2015–16	Señora Acero	Javier Ferraro	
2017–18	El Vato	Marcos Gutierrez	
2023	Drag Race México	Himself	Guest judge; Episode: "Snatch Game – Mexico Season 1"
