= To Rob a Thief =

- original cover art
- Directed by: Joe Menendez
- Written by: JoJo Henrickson
- Produced by: Roni Eguia Menendez; James M. McNamara; Ben Odell
- Starring: Fernando Colunga; Miguel Varoni; Julie Gonzalo; Gabriel Soto; Ivonne Montero; Sonya Smith; Saul Lisazo; Ruben Garfias; Oscar Torre; JoJo Henrickson
- Cinematography: Adam Silver
- Edited by: Joe Menendez
- Music by: Andres Levin
- Production companies: Panamax Films; Narrow Bridge Films
- Distributed by: Lionsgate
- Release date: 31 August 2007 (US: limited)
- Running time: 98 minutes
- Country: United States
- Language: Spanish
- Budget: $1.2 million
- Box office: $6.8 million

To Rob a Thief (Spanish: Ladrón que Roba a Ladrón) is a 2007 Spanish-language film in which two thieves reunite to rob a television mogul. The sequel Ladrones was released in 2015.

== Plot ==
Two thieves plan to rob a businessman who has defrauded many poor families. When none of their affiliates want to go undercover as day laborers to pull off the heist, the two men turn to the real thing for help. Emilio, a Colombian con man, arrives in LA with two weeks to complete his plan to rob a former colleague, Claudio Silvestrini who now poses as Moctezuma Valdéz, who's made a fortune using infomercials to peddle snake oil to Latino immigrants. Emilio's friend Alejandro, who sells pirated DVDs, has assembled a team of amateurs, who, as Alejandro says, will go unnoticed because they're immigrants. The team must gain entry to Silvestrini's well-guarded mansion, steal two keys to access a vault, and then get the money off the property. A father and his tomboy daughter, a nervous Cuban actor, a techie, and a muscle man make up the team, plus Alejandro has been courting Silvestrini's nanny, Gloria. Silvestrini recognizes Alejandro to be a thief and leads Gloria to break up with Alejandro. In the end, it is revealed that Gloria was a spy that Alejandro had implanted without any of the crew knowing. In fact, Gloria is Alejandro's wife.

== Cast ==
- Fernando Colunga as Alejandro Toledo
- Miguel Varoni as Emilio Lopez
- Saúl Lisazo as Moctesuma 'Mocte' Valdez
- Ivonne Montero as Rafaela
- Oscar Torre as Miguelito
- Ruben Garfias as Rafa
- Gabriel Soto as Aníbal Cano
- Julie Gonzalo as Gloria / Dora
- JoJo Henrickson as Julio Miranda
- Sonya Smith as Veronica Valdez
- Lidia Pires as Blanca
- Richard Azurdia as Primitivo
- Art Bonilla as Coyote

== Reception ==
Ladrón que Roba a Ladrón has received generally favorable reviews. It holds a 64% rating on Rotten Tomatoes based on reviews from 28 critics. On Metacritic it has a score of 61 out of 100 based on 11 reviews.

== Release ==
Ladrón que Roba a Ladrón had a limited release on August 31, 2007 in the United States.
