= Eddie Matos (actor) =

Puerto Rican actor

- Born: Eduardo Matos; July 18, 1978 (age 47); San Juan, Puerto Rico
- Occupation: Actor
- Years active: 1999─present

Eduardo Matos (born July 18, 1978), known professionally as Eddie Matos, a Puerto Rican actor best known for his role as Ricky Garza on the ABC daytime soap Port Charles.

Matos was born in San Juan, Puerto Rico and graduated from North Hunterdon High School in New Jersey in June 1996. He lived in Miami before relocating to Los Angeles to pursue a career in acting.

== Career ==
After a few guest appearances in various prime-time shows, Matos originated the role of Ricky Garza on ABC's daytime soap opera Port Charles. After the show was canceled in 2003, Matos continued to do guest appearances, before landing the role of Professor Pete Marquez on ABC's General Hospital. Matos recurred on General Hospital from September 2006 until early 2007. Matos went on to star in the CBS series Cane, alongside Jimmy Smits, Hector Elizondo, and Rita Moreno. He also guest starred on the Fox hit medical drama House M.D.

Eddie Matos joined the cast of All My Children in 2010, playing the role of Reverend Ricky Torres.

He graduated from the University of Miami and is a huge Hurricanes Fan.

== Roles ==
- Clueless (TV series) (Tyler – 1999) credited as Thomas Caron
- The Bold and the Beautiful (Charlie Espinada – 2001)
- Wanderlust (Drowned Sailor – 2001)
- All About Us (TV series) (Steven Castelli – 2001)
- Port Charles (Ricky Garza – 2001–2003)
- Tru Calling (Charlie – 2004)
- Charmed (Paramedic Garcia – 2004)
- Women in Law (James – 2006)
- In Justice (Cruz Salgado – 2006)
- Pepper Dennis (Marcus – 2006)
- General Hospital (Pete Marquez – 2006–2007)
- Cane (Henry Duque – 2007–2008)
- House (Felipe – 2010)
- All My Children (Rev. Ricky Torres - 2010-2011)
- Psych (Lordan - 2013)
- Finding Carter (Kyle - 2014)
- Hart of Dixie (Enrique - 2014)

== Trivia ==
- Matos was in a three-person band called "23 Link Chain", in which he played drums.
