= El Vato =

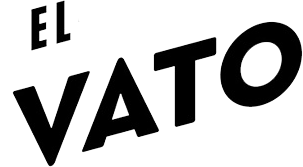
- Genre: Biographical
- Created by: Jorge Dorantes
- Screenplay by: José Ramón Menéndez; Ana Sofía Clerici; José Miguel Núñez; Augusto Mendoza
- Directed by: Javier Solar
- Starring: El Dasa; Cristina Rodlo; Gustavo Egelhaaf; Ricardo Polanco
- Music by: El Dasa
- Country of origin: United States
- Original language: Spanish
- No. of seasons: 2
- No. of episodes: 23

Production
- Executive producers: Patricia Morales Galindo; Alejandro Rincón; Bilai Joa Silar; Sergio Lazarov; Marcel Ferrer; Margie Moreno
- Producer: Sergio Guerrero
- Cinematography: Andrés León Becker
- Editor: Mauricio Sariñana
- Camera setup: Multi-camera
- Running time: 43 minutes
- Production companies: Boomdog Films; Endemol Shine North America; Universal Television

Original release
- Network: NBC Universo
- Release: April 17, 2016 – November 26, 2017

El Vato is an American biographical television series based on the life of Mexican singer El Dasa and created by Endemol Shine North America and Boomdog Films for NBC Universo. The plot focuses of the story of Mexican singer El Vato and his friends in their attempt to triumph in the treacherous and seductive musical world of Los Angeles, California. The series stars El Dasa, Cristina Rodlo, Gustavo Egelhaaf and Ricardo Polanco. The first season of the series was broadcast simultaneously by Telemundo and by NBC Universo.

On May 19, 2016, NBC Universo renewed the series for a second season, which premiered on August 27, 2017.

== Synopsis ==
=== Season 1 (2016) ===
El Vato offers contestants a unique opportunity in your life to record the next great album that will give them the leap to fame, but in return one have to leave their simple life in Sonora to live under the brightness of the lights of Los Angeles and try to stay focused in the midst of all the temptations of the big city. For El Vato, it's time to jump to stardom or go home.

=== Season 2 (2017) ===
The scripted-drama inspired by Regional Mexican singer El Dasa's incredible real life story follows El Vato and his friends as they continue fighting for their dreams in Los Angeles in pursuit of a coveted spot in the Regional Mexican music world. After signing a contract, El Vato realizes he is trapped. Lolo Lozada (Horacio Castelo) the owner of his contract, only signed him to stop him from competing with other 'norteño' singers in his record label company. His friends, Mariana, (Cristina Rodlo), Brandon (Ricardo Polanco), and 'El Pollo' (Gustavo Egelhaaf) as usual will accompany him on his adventures but the journey to stardom will not be easy. El Vato will have to face people who want take him down, deal with new love affairs and do the impossible to continue moving forward with his friends.

== Cast ==
- El Dasa as Miguel Cisneros / El Vato
- Cristina Rodlo as Mariana Gaxiola
- Gustavo Egelhaaf as El Pollo
- Ricardo Polanco as Brandon
- Itatí Cantoral as Wendy Lozada
- Mauricio Martínez as Marcos Gutiérrez
- Arcelia Ramírez as Doña Eli
- Mónica Dionne as Jackie
- Patricio Sebastián as El Vato child
- Leonardo Daniel as Emiliano Galeana
- Alejandro Calva as Don Jesús "Chucho" Durán
- José María de Tavira as Rogelio Galeana
- Luz Ramos as Roxana Sotomayor
- Ana Bárbara as Herself
- Paty Cantú as Herself
- Antonio de la Vega as Leandro León
- Sebastián Ferrat as Filiberto Cisneros
- Mauricio Isaac as Germán Lozada
- Giancarlo Vidrio as Joey
- Horacio Castelo as Daniel "Lolo" Lozada

== Episodes ==
=== Series overview ===
Season	Episodes	Originally released	
Season	Episodes	First released	Last released
1	10	April 17, 2016	June 19, 2016
2	13	August 27, 2017	November 26, 2017

=== Season 1 (2016) ===
No. overall	No. in season	Title	Original release date
1	1	"El Wolf de Hollywood Hills"	April 17, 2016
At a party at his mansion in Hollywood Hills, El Vato is officially presented and faces the famous singer Marcos Gutierrez.
2	2	"Happy birthday Mr. Lobo"	April 24, 2016
El Vato and his compas learn that the recorder who signed them washes money; Decide to sneak into Lolo's birthday party to impress him.
3	3	"Movimiento Alternado"	May 1, 2016
Wendy does not answer El Vato's call, reason why he and his band look for to obtain a contract. The opportunity comes with the offer to compose a narcocorrido.
4	4	"¿Tienes talento?"	May 8, 2016
El Vato competes in a talent show where La Sultana del Norte is a judge, Lolo appears and makes the Vato tremble.
5	5	"Cougars, yeguas y video"	May 15, 2016
El Pollo gets a job for El Vato in the luxury ranch in which he works; El Vato proposes to sneak a music video to upload it to social networks.
6	6	"Secretos"	May 22, 2016
Vato ends up driving for Rogelio, the son of the legendary band singer Emiliano Galena, who has to endure his whims.
7	7	"El corrido de Chino Prison"	May 29, 2016
El Vato receives an offer from Wendy Lozada, who is already launching her own label. At the same time, El Vato is contacted by an acquaintance of his father from jail.
8	8	"El Vato vuelve a la cima"	June 5, 2016
El Vato finally signs with Lolo. And the American dream returns. El Vato and his band celebrate. Vato's dad asks for money he needs to pay bail and get out of jail.
9	9	"El Vato One on One"	June 12, 2016
A few months have passed and El Vato has gone from scandal to scandal and from party to party. He has his 15 minutes of fame by a shooting, but they say that the bad press does not exist.
10	10	"Nuestros premios, nuestra gente"	June 19, 2016
Awards are given to the best of the RMM and Vato discovers that there are no good shortcuts to success.

=== Season 2 (2017) ===
No. overall	No. in season	Title	Original release date
11	1	"El corrido de la fuga"	August 27, 2017
El Vato goes ahead after an accident in which he almost lost his life. Lolo continues to sabotage his career while his friends accompany him on a very peculiar film project.
12	2	"Baraja de oro"	September 3, 2017
El Vato participates in a game of clandestine poker next to his father. If they win, they can settle the debt with Lolo. When the "enturanch" gets involved, the mission gets complicated.
13	3	"Viral"	September 10, 2017
When El Vato discovers that his videos are achieving a large number of views on the internet and that will also generate profits, he decides to risk everything.
14	4	"Power of the people"	September 17, 2017
El Vato joins the tour in homage to Wendy and Lolo makes his life impossible. Marcos manages to earn points with Mariana and her friends.
15	5	"El contrato"	October 1, 2017
El Vato seeks legal help to get out of his ominous contract with Lolo. Filiberto convinces the Vato to sing a new song that he has composed for a very powerful narco.
16	6	"La jaula de oro"	October 8, 2017
Although the entourage manages El Vato to annul his contract with Lolo, happiness lasts little. They find that their work visas are no longer valid and must make a decision urgently.
17	7	"El hijo pródigo"	October 15, 2017
After losing their visas and the right to their artistic name, Vato, Pollo and Brandon return to Hermosillo. There, new professional opportunities arise and El Vato meets with an old love.
18	8	"El paraíso perdido"	October 22, 2017
Things in Hermosillo begin to work for El Vato. All the entourage, except Brandon, adapt to their life in Mexico but the shadow of Lolo chases after them and they must return to Los Angeles.
19	9	"Y volver, volver"	October 29, 2017
Vato, Pollo and Brandon try to return to the US to reach his dreams and confront Lolo, but his journey takes an unexpected turn. Lolo confesses to Estela his hidden past.
20	10	"Vato vs Vato"	November 5, 2017
Lolo finally plans to destroy Vato by throwing another singer with his stage name. The entourage decides to offer a free concert, but producing it will not be easy.
21	11	"Sonaron cuatro balazos"	November 12, 2017
Vato and his friends do everything possible to raise the funds they need for the concert. With this strategy they want to expose Lolo and his fake Vato.
22	12	"El que hierro mata..."	November 19, 2017
El Vato must respond to the press after the violent incidents that occurred during his concert and decides to reveal Lolo's secret about the murder of Wendy.
23	13	"El corrido de Miguel Cisneros"	November 26, 2017
El Vato finally wins the battle against Lolo and decides to open an independent label with his friends and his father, but an action by Filiberto complicates happiness.

== Awards and nominations ==
Year	Award	Category	Nominated	Result
2018	International Emmy Award	Best Non-English Language U.S. Primetime Program	El Vato	Won
