= El Capitán Camacho =

- Genre: Drama
- Created by: Juan Camilo Ferrand
- Directed by: Álvaro Curiel; Emilio Maillé
- Starring: Humberto Zurita; José María de Tavira
- Music by: Pascual Reyes
- Original language: Spanish
- No. of seasons: 1
- No. of episodes: 60

Production
- Executive producer: Perla Martínez
- Producer: Carolina Salazar
- Editor: Nicolenca Beltrán
- Camera setup: Multi-camera
- Production companies: Estudios TeleMéxico; Fox Telecolombia

Original release
- Network: MundoFox
- Release: 22 March 2015 – 2015

El capitán Camacho is a Spanish-language drama television series created and developed by Juan Camilo Ferrand and produced by Estudios TeleMéxico and Fox Telecolombia. It is based on the life of pilot, radio announcer and Mexican businessman Carlos Camacho Espíritu. The series premiered on March 22, 2015 on MundoFox. (Note: It is unknown how many episodes were released and their date of final broadcast.) It stars Humberto Zurita as Captain Carlos Camacho and José María de Tavira as Young Captain Carlos Camacho.

The series is scheduled premiered August 7, 2017 in Mexico on Imagen Televisión.

== Plot ==
The series is not only the story of a man, it is the story of all the Mexicans who at the time were subdued and enslaved in their own lands, forced to emigrate constantly to an unjust destiny and forced to work to build a country of which They could never expect a greater reward than survival. Captain Carlos Camacho embodies a history of traitors, of men devoid of all faith, showing that even in the worst circumstances a man can change the destiny of many if he moves a greater purpose, be it justice or revenge.

== Cast ==
- Humberto Zurita as Captain Carlos Camacho
- José María de Tavira as Young Captain Carlos Camacho
- Sara Corrales as Lina Marcela Durán
- Gabriela de la Garza as Machu
- Antonio Gaona as Jonas
- Vanessa Bauche as Brigida
- Adriana Llabres as Susana
- Verónica Falcón as María Bárbara
- Claudette Maillé as Gloria
- Roberto Quijano as Valentina
- Cristina Rodlo as Young Machu
- Christian Vázquez as Tirzo
- Quetzalli Cortés as Carmelo
- Marius Biegai as Arthur
- Adriana Burgos as Carmen
- Ricardo Mestre as Robert
- Germán Bracco as Camacho Jr.
