= Cristina Rodlo =

Mexican actress (b. 1990)

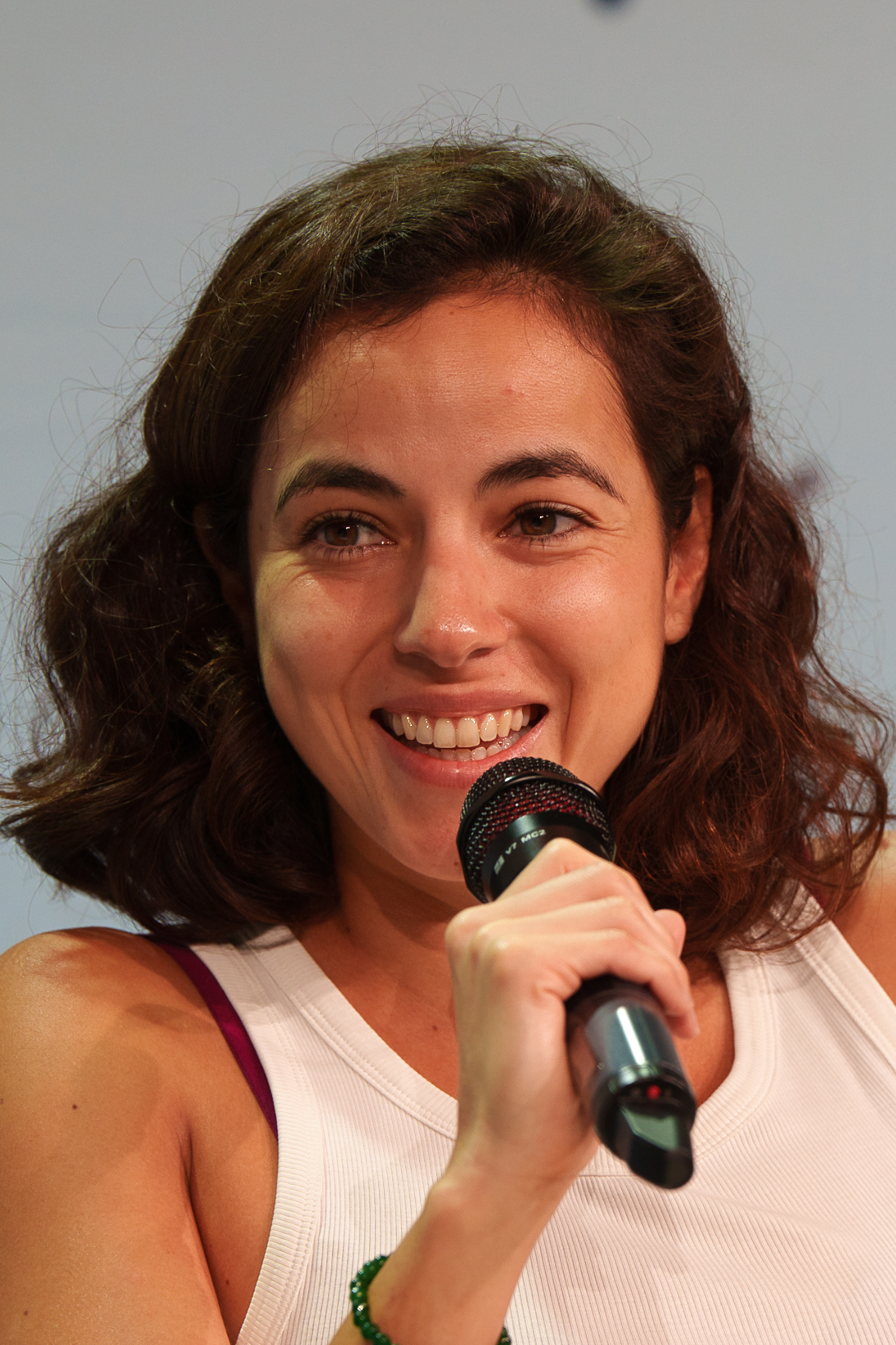
- Rodlo at GalaxyCon Raleigh in 2024
- Born: Cristina Rodríguez Lozano; May 21, 1990 (age 35); Torreón, Coahuila, Mexico
- Occupation: Actress
- Years active: 2008–present

Cristina Rodríguez Lozano (born May 21, 1990) is a Mexican actress who appeared as Isabel Urrutia Zavaleta in 93 episodes of Vuelve Temprano (2016 – 2017) and 23 episodes of El Vato (2017). She has starred in feature films as Fabiana in Perdida and as Suzu in the 2019 remake of Miss Bala, and played a lead role as Ambar in the horror movie No One Gets Out Alive in 2021. Other credits include Ladrones (2015), Too Old to Die Young (2019), The Terror (2019), 68 Whiskey (2020), Halo (2024), and The Beautiful Game (2024).

== Biography ==
Cristina Rodlo was born on May 21, 1990, was brought up in the city of Torreón in Coahuila, northern Mexico. She took part in a theatre production at the age of 11 and decided from that moment that she wanted to be an actress. After attending auditions in Monterrey for a position at the American Musical and Dramatic Academy (AMDA) in New York City, Rodlo was offered a scholarship, only to be told by her parents it was unaffordable. She sought sponsorship from local companies unsuccessfully, but eventually found a local politician who agreed to finance the cost of her training, so at age 18, she left Mexico to learn acting at AMDA in New York City. Rodlo now resides in Los Angeles(2020).

== Career ==
After graduating from AMDA, Rodlo returned to Mexico, as she was advised that "she did not look Mexican enough" to land stereotypical Latino roles in the United States at the time. Rodlo forged a successful career in Mexico, appearing in 23 episodes of El Vato and 92 episodes of Vuelve Temprano between 2016 and 2017, eventually achieving a nomination of Mejor revelación femenina (Best Newcomer - Female) at the 2016 Diosas de Plata awards, for her performance as Jackie Ramírez in the 2015 movie Ladrones (Bandits)

in 2019, Rodlo broke into American television with roles as the High Priestess spirit of Death, Yaritza, in Amazon Prime's Too Old to Die Young , and as Luz Ojeda in the AMC historica drama The Terror. The same year, Rodlo played Suzu in the 2019 remake of Miss Bala, with co-star Gina Rodriguez.

In 2020, Rodlo joined the inaugural cast of 68 Whiskey to play army medic Rosa Alvarez, in an American military comedy-drama television series (purportedly similar to M*A*S*H) produced by Ron Howard. In 2021, Rodlo played the lead role in the Santiago Menghini-directed Netflix horror film No One Gets Out Alive, alongside Marc Menchaca. The film was shot in Bucharest, Romania, during the COVID-19 pandemic.

In 2022, Rodlo was the protagonist in the Roque Falabella directed Vix horror movie El Vestido De La Novia (En. The Dress of the Bride), alongside Mariano Palacios, where her dream wedding was about to turn into a nightmare.

In 2023, Rodlo played Aída in the Paramount+ series Tengo Que Morir Todas Las Noches (I Have to Die Every Night), a series about gay culture from 1980 in Mexico, which was illegal in Mexico at the time.

Rodlo joined the cast of season 2 of Halo, which aired in February 2024, alongside fellow newcomer Joseph Morgan. She plays Corporal Talia Perez, a specialist in linguistics for the United Nations Space Command (UNSC), having had little real combat experience.

== Filmography ==
=== Film ===
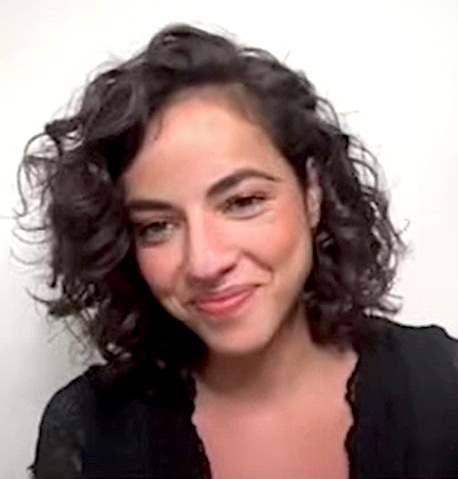
Cristina Rodlo interview about Halo in 2024

Year	Title	Role	Remarks
2008	Verano 79	Eva	Short film
2011	Red Hook Black	Eva	
2011	Daydreamed	Michelle	Short film
2012	The Condemned	Ana	
2015	Ladrones	Jackie Ramírez	
2015	Victoria	Victoria	Short film
2016	Juego de héroes	Maro	
2017	Como te ves me vi	Karla Quiñones	
2018	11:11	Alicia	Short film
2019	Perdida	Fabiana	
2019	Miss Bala	Suzu	
2021	The Dance	Cristina	Short film
2021	No One Gets Out Alive	Ambar	
2022	El Vestido De La Novia	Sara	
2024	The Beautiful Game	Rosita	

=== Television ===
Year	Title	Role	Notes
2012	Pacientes	Brenda	2 episodes
2013	Las trampas del deseo	Rubi	9 episodes
2013	Fortuna	Mónica Casasola	Episode #1.43
2013	24 Casetas	Penelope	1 episode
2014	Dos Lunas	Melissa	4 episodes
2015	El Capitán Camacho	Machu Joven	Episode #1.1
2016–2017	El Vato	Mariana Gaxiola	23 episodes
2016–2017	2091	Enira	12 episodes
2016–2017	Vuelve Temprano	Isabel Urrutia Zavaleta	92 episodes
2019	Too Old to Die Young	Yaritza	6 episodes
2019	Noches con Platanito	Guest	1 episode
2019	The Terror	Luz Ojeda	10 episodes
2017–2020	Run Coyote Run	Tisha	2 episodes
2020	68 Whiskey	Rosa Alvarez	10 episodes
2024	Halo	Talia Perez	Main role (season 2)
2023-2024	Tengo Que Morir Todas Las Noches	Aída	8 episodes

== Awards and nominations ==
Year	Award	Category	Nominated work	Result	Ref.
2016	Diosas de Plata	Mejor revelación femenina (Best Newcomer - Female)	Ladrones	Nominated	
2024	Premios Aura	International Hispanic Talent	Halo season 2	Won	
