= Qué pena tu vida =

Qué pena tu vida may refer to:

- Qué pena tu vida (Fuck My Life), 2010 Chilean film
- Qué pena tu vida (2016 film), Mexican film based on the Chilean film
