= Cane (TV series) =

American television series

- Genre: Drama
- Created by: Cynthia Cidre
- Directed by: Christian Duguay
- Starring: Jimmy Smits; Héctor Elizondo; Nestor Carbonell; Rita Moreno; Paola Turbay; Eddie Matos; Michael Trevino; Lina Esco; Samuel Carman; Alona Tal; Polly Walker
- Composer: David Nessim Lawrence
- Country of origin: United States
- Original language: English
- No. of seasons: 1
- No. of episodes: 13

Production
- Executive producers: Cynthia Cidre; Jonathan Prince; Jimmy Iovine; Polly Anthony
- Production location: Miami Beach, Florida
- Cinematography: Rick Bota
- Running time: 42 minutes
- Production companies: Once a Frog Productions; El Sendero Productions; Interscope Television; ABC Studios; CBS Paramount Network Television

Original release
- Network: CBS
- Release: September 25 – December 18, 2007

Cane is an American drama television series created by Cynthia Cidre, who also served as executive producer alongside Jonathan Prince, Jimmy Iovine, and Polly Anthony. The pilot was directed by Christian Duguay. The show chronicled the lives and internal power struggles of a powerful and wealthy Cuban-American family running an immensely successful rum and sugarcane business in South Florida.

Produced by ABC Studios, CBS Paramount Network Television, El Sendero Productions, Interscope Records, and Once a Frog Productions, the series premiered on September 25, 2007, airing on Tuesday nights at 10:00/9:00c on CBS, following The Unit. The series premiere of the show brought in 11 million viewers, the best in its time slot since 1999's Judging Amy.

== Plot ==
Starring Jimmy Smits, this epic drama chronicles the external rivalries and internal power struggles of a large Cuban-American family running an immensely successful rum and sugarcane business in South Florida. When the family patriarch, Pancho Duque, is offered a lucrative but questionable deal by his bitter adversaries, the Samuels, he is faced with a difficult choice: Should he cash out of the sugar business and focus solely on rum, which would please his biological son, Frank Duque? Or should he protect the family legacy that he built from the ground up by refusing to sell? This would involve siding with his son-in-law, Alex Vega, who despises the Samuels and foresees multibillion-dollar profits from future ethanol contracts.

Alex and Frank's approaches to business are as different as their approaches to life. While Frank focuses on chasing women, Alex is devoted to his beautiful wife, Isabel Vega. Married to him when she was just 17 years old, Isabel chooses not to involve herself in the family business, focusing instead on raising their three children, who are determined to forge their own paths outside the family. Will family allegiance come first or will their secrets and acrimonious conflicts over love, lust, and money lead to their downfall?

== Cast ==
Jimmy Smits portrays Alex Vega in the lead role as the Duques' adopted son and chosen heir to the family's sugar and rum business. Smits is also a co-executive producer of the show. Héctor Elizondo and Rita Moreno star as Pancho and Amalia Duque, the family patriarch and matriarch. Nestor Carbonell was cast as Frank Duque, the impulsive firstborn son. Other Duque children are portrayed by Paola Turbay and Eddie Matos as Isabel Duque Vega, Alex's wife and mother of three children, and Henry Duque, the youngest son of Pancho and Amalia, respectively. Alex and Isabel's children are played respectively by Michael Trevino, Lina Esco, and Samuel Carman as Jaime, Katie, and Artie Vega. Oscar Torre played Santo, a Cuban refugee who was Mr. Vega's bodyguard. Polly Walker and Ken Howard appear as Ellis and Joe Samuels, members of the Duques' rival family, and Alona Tal rounds out the cast portraying Rebecca (King) Vega, Jaime's wife.

=== Casting ===
Casting for all of the principal roles on the show took place from February to March 2007. Smits was the first actor to be cast in February 2007, while also serving as producer under his production company, El Sendero Productions. In order of casting, Nestor Carbonell, Eddie Matos, Rita Moreno, and Michael Trevino were chosen to play their respective parts in February, while Hector Elizondo, Samuel Carman, Alona Tal, Lina Esco, and Paola Turbay joined the cast in early March. Polly Walker was the last to join the cast a few weeks before HBO aired the last episode of Rome.

== Cancellation ==
Due to the 2007–2008 Writers Guild of America strike, Cane completed its first season on December 18, 2007. On February 8, 2008, the Los Angeles Times reported that the effects of the writers strike "could spell sudden death for such programs as NBC's Bionic Woman and CBS' Cane, industry executives predicted." It was also reported by USA Today that Cane would be "gone for good." On February 14, 2008, CBS released a statement declaring that Cane is still on "hiatus to accommodate the midseason launches of Big Brother, Jericho, and Dexter." In an April 2008 interview, CBS Entertainment President Nina Tassler called the drama's chances for renewal "a real long shot." On May 14, 2008, CBS officially cancelled the series.

== Production ==
=== Conception ===
The series began development when Polly Anthony, an Interscope Records executive, and Jonathan Prince pitched the idea of a "Latino Godfather" series to CBS entertainment chief, Nina Tassler. Tassler then suggested Cynthia Cidre, an Emmy Award-nominated screenwriter, pen the script for the pilot. Although initially reluctant since she had already written about her Cuban-American heritage several times in her career, Cidre warmed up to the idea, believing that her previous Latin-themed projects were ahead of their time and that she should return to her roots.

The project was initially titled, Los Duques (The Dukes) or Untitled Cynthia Cidre Project, when commissioned in January 2007 but was later renamed Cane in May 2007. Christian Duguay agreed to direct the pilot in March 2007. The series was picked up and given a 13-episode order on May 14, 2007.

=== Broadcasting history ===
The series premiered on CBS on September 25, 2007, as announced on July 18, 2007, by the network. The pilot episode was leaked to BitTorrent websites in the same month to the chagrin of studio executives. Cane was unaffected by the 2007 Writers Guild of America strike, as all the episodes had been written before the strike started.

=== International distribution ===
Country	TV Network	Air date
Australia	Network Ten	Wednesdays 9:30
New Zealand	TV3 (New Zealand)	Mondays 11 pm
Brazil	Warner Channel	Mondays 10 pm
Mexico	Warner Channel, Azteca 7	Mondays 10 pm, Wednesdays 11 pm
Canada	Global	
Croatia	HRT	Mondays 8:40 pm
Hungary	TV2	Fridays 20:15
Finland	Nelonen	Tuesdays 9 pm
Lithuania	TV3	Mondays 10 pm
Latvia	Fox Life	
Norway	TV2	January 31, 2008
Poland	POLSAT, Universal Channel	
Portugal	Fox Life, RTP1	Fridays 17:40, Fridays 12:30 am
Estonia	Fox Life	
South America	Warner Channel	
United Kingdom	ITV3	Thursday 27 March 9 pm
Iceland	Skjár 1	The first episode will air on March 3, 2008
Puerto Rico	Telemundo	Sundays 8 pm
Slovenia	POP TV	Sundays 10 pm
Denmark	TV2	Sundays 3 pm
France	Serie Club	Mondays 8.45 pm
Belgium	RTL TVI	Sunday 5.00 pm
(Republic of Ireland) Ireland	RTÉ Two	Friday about 1 am
South Africa	SABC 3	Mondays-Wednesdays 9 pm
Switzerland	TSR 1	Wednesdays 12 pm

== Episodes ==
No.	Title	Directed by	Written by	Original release date	Prod. code
1	"Pilot"	Christian Duguay	Cynthia Cidre	September 25, 2007	101
Facing health problems, Pancho decides it is time to step down as head of the family business, Duque Rum and Sugar. He must choose between his first-born son and his adoptive son, which could create a rift in the family.
2	"The Work of a Business Man"	Sanford Bookstaver	Cynthia Cidre	October 2, 2007	102
As he begins his duties at Duque Rum, Alex makes a proposal for an ethanol refinery to the Senator, despite the fact that Frank is opposed to the idea. He must also deal with the outcome of events regarding the murder of Quiñones.
3	"The Two Alex Vegas"	Peter Markle	Peter Noah	October 9, 2007	103
Alex devises a business scheme that forces Frank to choose between his own family and the Samuelses.
4	"Family Business"	Andrew Bernstein	Anne McGrail and Peter Noah	October 16, 2007	104
Alex goes head-to-head with Pancho, and later Isabel, in the family's first major split since he became CEO. Meanwhile, Pancho reveals a secret he has been keeping from his family, and Alex's past actions with Quiñones come back to haunt him. Guest stars are Kristin Cavallari and Nicole Scherzinger.
5	"Brotherhood"	Sanford Bookstaver	Michael Foley	October 23, 2007	105
Alex is in for some serious trouble when Senator Barnes resigns and their ethanol deal hangs on the line. Not only that, but the police begin to zero in on Santo and him about the Quiñones murder.
6	"A New Legacy"	Paul Holahan	Nicole Mirante	October 30, 2007	106
Business starts to get rough when Henry is beaten up by his club's investors, and Alex has to take over to defend him. Meanwhile, Pancho goes out on the quest for a new master blender for Duque rum.
7	"One Man is an Island"	Alex Zakrzewski	Bruce Rasmussen	November 6, 2007	107
Alex comes up with a plan to save Duque Rum and finds incriminating evidence against the Samuelses in the process. Meanwhile, Pancho reveals the truth about his daughter's death to Frank. Guest star is Alicia Keys.
8	"All Bets Are Off"	Karen Gaviola	Dailyn Rodriguez	November 13, 2007	108
Joe frames Ellis for his illegal purchasing of Cuban land. Meanwhile, Alex learns that the future of Duque Rum is in jeopardy after a massive gambling debt of Frank's is discovered.
9	"The Exile"	Jesús S. Treviño	Joe Hortua	November 20, 2007	109
Alex's plan to bring down Joe for his illegal land deals falls apart, and instead the Duque Rum trucks are hijacked by mobsters. When Pancho learns of everything that Alex has been up to, he forces him to step down as CEO of the company.
10	"Time Away"	Sanford Bookstaver	Peter Noah	November 27, 2007	110
Alex goes on a gambling trip to the Caribbean with Ramon and his crew that initially makes him feel very comfortable with the Cuban gangsters, until the trip turns violent.
11	"Hurricane"	Leon Ichaso	Bruce Rasmussen	December 11, 2007	111
As a hurricane strikes, Alex and Frank are held at gunpoint by looters in the Duque home. Meanwhile, Isabel gets trapped in an elevator and Santo protects Artie during the storm.
12	"The Perfect Son"	James Whitmore, Jr.	Cynthia Cidre	December 11, 2007	112
As Jamie is about to get married, Ramon and his gang handle security outside the event after Alex is tipped off that Joe Samuels has plans to disrupt the wedding.
13	"Open and Shut"	Felix Alcala	Peter Noah	December 18, 2007	113
When Alex is framed for the murder of Joe Samuels, he takes matters into his own hands and begins to investigate the case himself.

== U.S. nielsen ratings ==
In the following table, "Rating" is the estimated percentage of all televisions tuned to the show, and "Share" is the percentage of all televisions in use that are tuned in.

#	Title	Rating	Share	18–49 (Rating/Share)	Total viewers
1	"Pilot"	7.5	13	2.9/8	11.12
2	"The Work of a Business Man"	6.0	10	2.5/7	9.24
3	"The Two Alex Vegas"	6.0	10	2.4/7	9.10
4	"Family Business"	5.8	10	2.2/6	8.50
5	"Brotherhood"	5.4	9	2.0/5	7.98
6	"A New Legacy"	5.5	9	2.0/5	8.06
7	"One Man is an Island"	5.1	9	1.9/5	7.83
8	"All Bets Are Off"	5.1	8	1.8/5	7.29
9	"The Exile"	5.1	8	2.0/5	7.64
10	"Time Away"	4.3	6	1.6/4	6.46
11	"Hurricane"	5.4	9	1.9/5	8.00
12	"The Perfect Son"	5.3	9	2.0/6	7.83
13	"Open and Shut"	4.9	8	1.8/5	7.19
