= Perdida (2019 film) =

Mexican drama film

- Directed by: Jorge Michel Grau
- Written by: Anton Goenechea
- Based on: La cara oculta by Andrés Baiz
- Starring: Paulina Dávila; José María de Tavira
- Cinematography: Santiago Sanchez
- Edited by: Jorge Macaya
- Production company: Dynamo
- Release dates: October 2019 (Morelia International Film Festival); 10 January 2020 (Mexico)
- Country: Mexico
- Language: Spanish

Perdida is a 2019 Mexican drama film directed by Jorge Michel Grau. The film is an adaptation of the 2011 Colombian film La cara oculta directed by Andrés Baiz, and it was presented at the seventeenth edition of the Morelia International Film Festival as part of the National Authors and Releases section. It stars Paulina Dávila, and José María de Tavira.

== Synopsis ==
Taken from the Spanish film website FilmAffinity:

"Eric (José María de Tavira) is hired as the new conductor of the Mexico City Philharmonic and moves to the city with Carolina (Paulina Dávila), his wife. Everything is perfect until one day she disappears. Eric, mired in pain at Carolina's apparent abandonment, meets Fabiana (Cristina Rodlo), the bar waitress he often frequents. They start a relationship full of mystery, sex and passion, but Fabiana asks herself questions about Carolina's mysterious disappearance."

== Cast ==
- Paulina Dávila as Carolina
- José María de Tavira as Eric
- Juan Carlos Colombo as Benitez
- Luis Fernando Peña as Vilches
- Cristina Rodlo as Fabiana
- Claudette Maillé as Blanca
- Paulette Hernández as Julia
- Sonia Franco as Ligia

== Release ==
It had its premiere in Mexico on January 10, 2020. Not before, it was also screened in the Morelia International Film Festival and Los Cabos International Film Festival in 2019.

== Reception ==
Perdida was very well received by critics and the majority of the audience, as it holds 92% approval in the Spanish version of the review aggregator Rotten Tomatoes, based on 5 reviews, all of which are positive, saying in its critical consensus that, "It stands out for its manufacturing and effective directing and it works thanks to the dynamism of cameras and the well-structured script. The actors without surprise manage to be convincing and create the appropriate suspense".
