= Chuti Tiu =

American actress

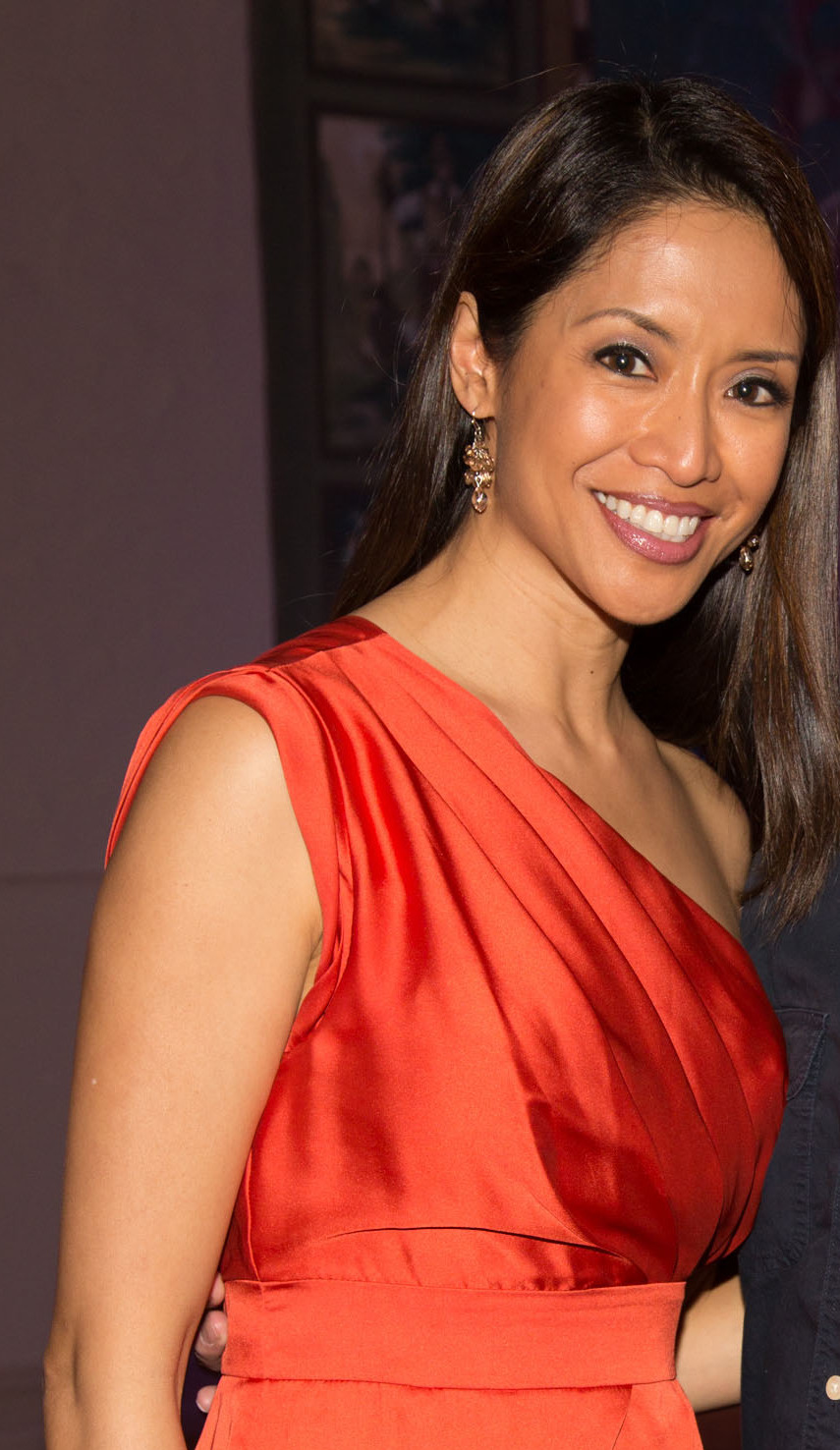
- Tiu at the 2013 Miami International Film Festival Pyrat Awards party
- Education: Northwestern University (B.A.)
- Occupation: Actress
- Years active: 1997–present
- Spouse: Oscar Torre

Chuti Tiu is an American actress.

== Early life ==
Tiu was raised in Milwaukee, Wisconsin, by Filipino immigrants. Her father is of Chinese origin and her mother is Filipina-Spanish. Her parents came to the United States as medical residents with "just $50 to their names and built a life from scratch, knowing no one." Tiu attended Divine Savior Holy Angels, an all girls high school.

== Education ==
Tiu earned a B.A. in Economics and Political Science from Northwestern University.

== Career ==
In 1994, Tiu was crowned 1994 Miss Illinois.

In 2000, Tiu became a lead actress in Sally Field's directorial debut Beautiful. Tiu has had many supporting roles in independent features such as The Specials with Rob Lowe and Thomas Haden Church. Tiu's television work includes a series regular role in Desire, a recurring role in the suspense thriller 24 starring Kiefer Sutherland, as well as guest/recurring appearances on such shows as The Closer, Dragnet, Charmed, General Hospital and Days of Our Lives. Chuti played Nurse Longino in the CBS series Miami Medical. She was seen as Lata, an attorney defending Woody Harrelson in the film Rampart, also starring Sigourney Weaver, Ben Foster, Anne Heche and Steve Buscemi.

== Filmography ==
Year	Film	Role	Notes
1997	Claude's Crib	Amy Lee	
1998	Jenny	Girl	
1998	Sister, Sister	Chante	
1998	Beverly Hills, 90210	Mia	
1998	Moesha	Physician	
1999	Port Charles	Judy Seng	
1999	Malcolm & Eddie	Capt. Vivian Hazelwood	
1999	The West Wing	Woman #2	
1999	The Strip	Josette Dupree	
2000	Tales of the South Seas	Tahura Savue	
2000	Charmed	Asian American Nurse	
2000	The Steve Harvey Show	Masseuse	
2000	Beautiful	Miss Hawaii	
2000	The Specials	Eight	
2000	Code Blue	Lian Cho	
2000	MechWarrior 4: Vengeance	Resistance MechWarrior “Karis”	
2001	Longshot	Antiques Dealer	
2003	L.A. Dragnet	Mira Jameela	
2003	24	Mae	
2003	General Hospital	Reporter	
2003	Days of Our Lives	Nurse Cheryl Noble	
2004	If Love Hadn't Left Me Lonely	Ricardo's Ex-wife	
2004	The Bold and the Beautiful	Audrey	
2005	Greener Mountains	Woman	
2006	Long-Term Relationship	Mary Margaret	
2006	Desire	Detective Rachel Lin	
2008	Tasty Time with ZeFronk	Mom	
2009	For a Fistful of Diamonds	Tatiana Romanova	
2009	Hannah Montana	Maria Brown	
2010	Miami Medical	Nurse Polly Longino	
2010	The Closer	Passenger in Elevator	
2011	Coyote Hunt	Charlotte	
2011	Rampart	Shark Lawyer #1	
2013	Raising Hope	Fox President	
2013	The Internship	Yo-Yo's mom	
2014	Pretty Rosebud	Cecilia 'Cissy' Santos	

== Awards ==
- 1987 Distinguished Young Women Award.
- 2014 10 Wins and 3 Nominations for Pretty Rosebud

== Personal life ==
Tiu's husband is Oscar Torre.
