= Ladrones (2015 film) =

- Directed by: Joe Menendez
- Written by: Jon Molerio
- Produced by: Alfonso Rodríguez
- Starring: Fernando Colunga; Eduardo Yáñez; Jessica Lindsey; Cristina Rodlo; Oscar Torre; Vadhir Derbez; Miguel Varoni; Evelyna Rodriguez; Frank Perozo; Carmen Beato; Nashla Bogaert
- Cinematography: Francis Adamez
- Edited by: Joe Menendez
- Music by: Luichy Guzman
- Distributed by: Pantelion Films
- Release date: October 9, 2015 (United States)
- Countries: Mexico; United States
- Languages: Spanish; English
- Box office: $3.1 million

Ladrones (English: Bandits) is a 2015 Mexican-American comedy film directed by Joe Menendez. It is the sequel to the film Ladrón que roba a ladrón produced in 2007. Starring Fernando Colunga, Eduardo Yáñez and Miguel Varoni, it was released on October 9, 2015.

== Cast ==
- Fernando Colunga as Alejandro Toledo
- Eduardo Yáñez as Santiago Guzmán
- Miguel Varoni as Emilio Sánchez
- Jessica Lindsey as Miranda Kilroy
- Frank Perozo as Rex
- Nashla Bogaert as María Elena
- Oscar Torre as Miguelito
- Evelyna Rodriguez as Maribel
- Cristina Rodlo as Jackie Ramirez
- Vadhir Derbez as Ray
- Carmen Beato as Josefa Ramírez
- Jon Molerio as Carlos
