= Cuna de lobos (2019 TV series) =

Mexican television series

- Genre: Drama
- Based on: Cuna de lobos by Carlos Olmos
- Screenplay by: Lily Ann Martín; Claudio Lacelli
- Directed by: Juan Pablo Blanco; Eric Morales
- Creative director: Diego Lascurain
- Starring: Paz Vega; Paulette Hernández; Gonzalo García Vivanco; Diego Amozurrutia; Nailea Norvind; Flavio Medina; Azela Robinson; Carlos Aragón; José Pablo Minor; Osvaldo de León; Leonardo Daniel
- Music by: Jordi Bachbush
- Opening theme: "Cuna de lobos"
- Composer: Pedro Plascencia Salinas
- Country of origin: Mexico
- Original language: Spanish
- No. of seasons: 1
- No. of episodes: 25

Production
- Executive producer: Giselle González
- Producer: Julieta de la O
- Editors: Juan José Segundo; Julio Abreu; Irving Rosas Jaimes
- Camera setup: Multi-camera
- Production company: Televisa

Original release
- Network: Las Estrellas
- Release: 7 October – 8 November 2019

Cuna de lobos (English: Cradle of Wolves) is a Mexican television series produced by Giselle González for Televisa. It is a reboot based on the 1986 Mexican telenovela of the same title and the second production of the Fábrica de sueños franchise. The series stars Paz Vega, Gonzalo García Vivanco, and Paulette Hernández. It premiered on 7 October 2019, and consists of 25 episodes.

The series revolves around Catalina Creel, whose great beauty is only surpassed by her cruelty, will go to any lengths to secure her fortune and bloodline. Filming of the production began on 15 April 2019 and concluded in July 2019.

== Plot ==
The story starts with Catalina Creel (Paz Vega), the matriarch of the Larios family, celebrating the anniversary of the Gothier jewelers with her son Alejandro (Diego Amozurrutia) and her husband Carlos (Leonardo Daniel). Leonora (Paulette Hernández), a spontaneous graphic journalist, arrives to cover the event and forms a connection with Alejandro. Catalina has absolute control over the Larios family and her husband Carlos, even managing to exile her stepson José Carlos, whom she hates (Gonzalo García Vivanco). José Carlos is Carlos's son from his first marriage to Gloria, who died years prior. After the celebration, Catalina and Carlos prepare to enjoy a second honeymoon trip aboard their yacht, but the romantic atmosphere is shattered after Carlos receives a call from a mysterious man who tells him Catalina is having an affair with his brother, Francisco. Carlos refuses to believe the man, who then sends him pictures of Catalina and Francisco together as proof. When Catalina is confronted with the evidence of her affair, she begrudgingly admits to it. The shock of the revelation causes Carlos, who has had heart problems for years, to collapse. As he lay dying Catalina taunts him and deals him another shocking blow: Alejandro is in fact Francisco's son. Seeing this as the perfect opportunity to rid herself of a man she detests, she pushes her husband overboard.

After Carlos's funeral, at the reading of the will, which stipulates a clear and forced clause addressed to both his sons: the first one to give him a grandson of his blood will be the universal heir of all his empire, to ensure the continuity of the Larios family. Although it seems that Alejandro has an advantage over his half-brother because of José Carlos's alcohol addiction, the truth is that Alejandro is keeping a dark secret that endangers his inheritance. For years Alejandro has been dating a man named Miguel. Catalina has never confronted him about it, however, with the inheritance in danger, she demands he starts an affair with Leonora, so she can be used to conceive the son they need. Catalina faces many adversaries in her path such as Luis (Osvaldo de León), an honest reporter who seeks to reveal the illegal business that occurs within Gothier and the mysterious death of Carlos Larios and her stepson José Carlos, who knows her and Alejandro's plan. José Carlos intends to prevent Leonora from being used to seize the inheritance. Catalina, in her obsession with the power of the Gothier jewelers, aims to kill anyone who gets in her way.

José Carlos, having overcome his addiction with the help of Leonora, whom he secretly loves despite her being with his brother, has become more involved in the businesses of Gothier jewelry stores, and discovers financial transactions that lead to a network of gemstone traffickers from Sierra Leone, Africa. José Carlos decides to travel to Sierra Leone, where he finds out that this dirty business has materialized at the cost of the exploitation of men, women and even children, sheltered by an important group of high-level officials within and out of the country. Scared of getting caught, Catalina plots to exile him again from the company and the family. To the delight of Catalina, Alejandro marries Leonora. Months later, Leonora gives birth to a boy they name Edgar. After the birth, Alejandro loses interest in his wife and son, and is determined to get back his ex Miguel (José Pablo Minor), which endangers Catalina's plans.

With the birth of Édgar, Leonora becomes an obstacle to Catalina, because she has seen who Catalina really is; in addition to this, she discovers the secret relationship that Alejandro has had for years with Miguel, understanding that she was only used to have a son they needed to get the family fortune. Catalina decides to forge a plan by getting Leonora locked up in prison and pitting Alejandro against her, who visits her in her cell and swears that he will make her pay by never letting her see her son again. Leonora feels that she is going crazy by seeing that Edgar is taken away. She begs José Carlos to help her out of prison and recover her baby. José Carlos, with the help of Luis, will start a race against time to get Leonora free and show that Catalina is the same person behind all the crimes.

== Cast and characters ==
=== Main ===
- Paz Vega as Catalina Creel, Carlos' wife, and Alejandro's mother.
- Paulette Hernández as Leonora Navarro, she is photographer of the newspaper La Verdad.
- Gonzalo García Vivanco as José Carlos Larios, Carlos' alcoholic son.
- Diego Amozurrutia as Alejandro Larios, Catalina's bisexual son.
- Nailea Norvind as Ámbar Reyes, Francisco's wife.
- Flavio Medina as Francisco Larios, Carlos' brother and Catalina's lover.
- Azela Robinson as Gélica Andrade, the housekeeper of the Larios house.
- Carlos Aragón as Diego Solórzano, Catalina's accomplice.
- José Pablo Minor as Miguel Terranova Contreras, Alejandro's boyfriend.
- Osvaldo de León as Luis Guzmán, reporter friend of Leonora.
- Leonardo Daniel as Carlos Larios, patriarch of the Larios family.

=== Guest stars ===
- Paulina Treviño as Margarita, Luis' wife.
- Emma Escalante as Mora, Alejandro's girlfriend, who resides in Madrid, Spain.
- Matías Luzbik as Matías Guzmán, Luis' son.
- Fernando Larrañaga
- Miroslava
- Adalberto Parra
- Juan Carlos Vives

== Ratings ==
=== Mexico ratings ===
Viewership and ratings per season of Cuna de lobos
Season	Timeslot (CT)	Episodes	First aired		Last aired		Avg. viewers (millions)
Season	Timeslot (CT)	Episodes	Date	Viewers (millions)	Date	Viewers (millions)	Avg. viewers (millions)
1	Mon–Fri 9:30pm	25	7 October 2019	5.8	8 November 2019	3.1	2.65

=== U.S. ratings ===
Viewership and ratings per season of Cuna de lobos
Season	Timeslot (ET)	Episodes	First aired		Last aired		Avg. viewers (millions)
Season	Timeslot (ET)	Episodes	Date	Viewers (millions)	Date	Viewers (millions)	Avg. viewers (millions)
1	Mon–Fri 9pm/8c	25	21 October 2019	1.45	26 November 2019	1.70	1.34

== Episodes ==
The title of each episode refers to a phrase mentioned by a character in it.

No.	Title	Mexico air date	U.S. air date	Mexico viewers (millions)	U.S. viewers (millions)
1	"Un muerto no puede cambiar su testamento"	7 October 2019 (Note: Premiered early online through Las Estrellas website on 4 October 2019.)	21 October 2019	5.8	1.45
In a boat where Catalina and her husband Carlos went to an unknown place, Carlos is shown drowning in the sea, asking Catalina for help, but instead she helps him decide to hit him with a fire extinguisher, and then to hit him, being he unconscious, she decides to throw Carlos's body into the sea to die drowned. A few hours before this event, Carlos was playing golf with his son Alejandro, but suddenly he suffers a pre-infarction, so the doctor recommends taking a vacation with his wife, and there Carlos and Catalina decide to organize a party, and then both go for the second time on honeymoon. On the other hand, José Carlos, the other son of Carlos, lives a miserable life by not having money and not having the support of his father to fulfill his whims. So it is necessary to press him so that his father yields to his whims, and begins to call him several times. But Carlos insists on not helping him. Meanwhile, the night falls and the farewell party of Catalina and Carlos begins, and in the middle of an interview the reporter Luis Guzmán bothers Catalina asking about the alleged matter of diamond trafficking that makes the Larios family diamond company. There Alejandro meets Leonora, a photographer that immediately upon learning that he is Catalina's son, begins to be more interested in him. After finishing the party, Alejandro is at home sending messages to his girlfriend Mora; but she gives him a surprise coming to his house without notifying him. While there, Mora learns that Alejandro is bisexual, since she finds him with another man. While she is furious, she decides to leave the place and threaten Alejandro to get his secret from everyone. Meanwhile, Catalina and Carlos, are heading to an unknown place on the boat they rented, suddenly Carlos receives a call from a mysterious man who tells him that his wife is unfaithful to his brother, and that his son Alejandro is not in his biological son. At that moment, Carlos furiously argues with Catalina, and in the middle of the discussion he begins to suffer another heart attack, and asks Catalina for help, but she refuses to help. And she decides to kill him, hitting him with a fire extinguisher, and then throws the body into the sea.
2	"Talón de Aquiles"	8 October 2019	22 October 2019	2.7	1.31
The episode begins with Catalina Creel sitting and saying her typical phrases, while a flashback of scenes of her is shown next to an unknown child, and then she is shown arriving at the morgue where they meet a coroner. In this episode the lawyer of the Larios family, summons all the members of the family to let them know about the will that Carlos left. Later when everyone meets, they see the will in video format, and there Carlos tells his family, that for their children to enjoy the inheritance, José Carlos or Alejandro must start a family and have a child. Or else within two years, the will will lose its validity and the inheritance will become part of a foundation. Meanwhile, Catalina tells her son Alejandro that she must end his relationship with Miguel so he can fulfill the will of his father Carlos. After these events, José Carlos begins to drink and get high without control and then in the middle of the road he runs into the ghost of his father, who blames him for having caused Catalina to lose her eye. On the other hand, Leonora calls Alejandro to ask them to meet, upon arriving at the residence of the Larios, she meets José Carlos in a drunken state, and at that time, José Carlos tries to take his own life by throwing himself into the pool to die drowned, but Leonora helps him. Later, Luis's wife tells him that his son disappeared, and they both think he was kidnapped; but in reality Catalina was the one who had the child in her possession, which she uses as an excuse to ask Luis to stop thinking that she is a murderer, and invites him to work with her in her diamond emporium. Meanwhile Mora tells Alejandro that in an interview he will have at night she will tell everyone that he is gay. Alejandro tells his mother, and she immediately looks for a way to resolve the matter, meeting with Mora and telling her that if she opens her mouth to tell Alejandro's secret, everyone will know she had a past as a pornographic actress. Then, Catalina meets the coroner who ruled that Carlos died of natural causes, to make him pay for having betrayed her. And at this moment the forensic tells her that he gave the original autopsy reports to a friend, and Catalina decides to kill him.
3	"Monstruos"	9 October 2019	23 October 2019	2.6	1.28
Gélica discovers a small spot of blood on a Catalina blouse, she finds her and tells Gélica to get rid of it. Luis sees in the news that Ignacio Vasco, the coroner who gave him the true opinion of Carlos Larios' autopsy, was murdered. So Luis tries to get rid of the opinion he gave to save. José Carlos is arrested for brutally beating a woman in a hotel room under the influence of alcohol and drugs, and for possession of illegal substances. Alejandro calls Leonora and invites her to dinner at the Larios mansion. Catalina picks up José Carlos in the ministry, he asks Catalina to believe him, that he is innocent of hitting the woman he was with at the hotel, and tells him how things happened. Catalina remembers that José Carlos discovered her having sex with Francisco, when Catalina finds José Carlos, he responds to her by fitting a toy arrow in her right eye, remembering how she lost her eye and her grudge against José Carlos. Alejandro and Miguel invite Leonora to a party, but Miguel begins to get jealous of Leonora. José Carlos leaves the public ministry with help from Ámbar, and Catalina claims Francisco for allowing it. Luis returns to work at Crónica Capital, with Catalina's help. Alejandro kisses Leonora, but José Carlos discovers him, and in an episode of jealousy confronts his brother.
4	"La Esmeralda"	10 October 2019	24 October 2019	2.5	1.29
After a date night, Leonora invites Alejandro to her house to drink beer, but later Luis arrives on an unexpected visit. The sexual tension between Gélica and Catalina begins to have roots. Ámbar discovers a message on Francisco's cell phone where Catalina is waiting for him in Acapulco, moments later, Francisco calls Catalina and Ámbar listens to the conversation Francisco had by phone call with Catalina. After Luis leaves Leonora's house, she and Alejandro spend the night together. The next morning, Catalina calls Alejandro, and reminds him of the plans to obtain Carlos's inheritance, to which he confirms that he spent the night with Leonora. José Carlos, annoyed, confronts Catalina for freezing his bank accounts. Leonora receives a gift ring sent by Alejandro at work, but he does not answer Leonora's call, since he was with Miguel. In that, Leonora goes to look for him at the Larios mansion, but by surprise she meets José Carlos. Catalina already in Acapulco, is waiting for Francisco, but by surprise Ámbar comes to confront her, during the discussion Catalina discovers that Ámbar was the one who sent photos of her infidelity with Francisco to Carlos, causing the heart attack that ended up killing him. In that, Catalina and Ámbar begin to fight to the death, until Catalina manages to submerge Ámbar's head, so that she can drown her. In the end, Catalina supposedly manages to kill Ámbar, but by carelessness when answering Alejandro's call, Catalina sees that Ámbar's body disappeared, to which she manages to escape from Catalina, but moments later, she is reached by Catalina, who manages to make her faint with a blow to the head and tie her in a safe place. Francisco arrives in Acapulco and spends the afternoon with Catalina aboard a yacht, hours later, Catalina sends a message to Francisco from Ámbar's phone, posing as her, telling her that she already knows everything about the relationship with Catalina.
5	"En esta vida no podemos ser débiles"	11 October 2019	25 October 2019	2.3	1.21
After hitting Ámbar and keeping her captive in the basement of her home in Acapulco, Catalina tries to convince Francisco to forget his wife. After several attempts to manipulate him, she convinces him to return to the city and talk to his nephews, once reunited, Francisco assures them that he is doing his best to find his wife. By informing them that Diego is the one who is helping him, José Carlos becomes enraged and demands that he call the police. In that, José Carlos decides to call his aunt to see how she is, Catalina answers the call but makes no sound. Then she hangs up the phone and sends a message to the worried young man assuring him that she is well and asks him not to look for her. Meanwhile, Leonora and Luis meet at night to take care of Matías and there, the reporter assures his friend that Alejandro Larios is with her solely for fashion. On the other hand, Miguel surprises Alejandro in his office and asks him to hire him as an advisor. After a small jealousy scene, the couple is in full romance when José Carlos interrupts and discovers them. Immediately, Alejandro tries to explain to his brother what is happening but the man only advises him to come out of the closet and not be manipulated by his mother. Meanwhile, Catalina calls Diego to go immediately to "La Esmeralda" and get rid of Ámbar. The henchman accepts and takes the woman in the trunk without knowing that she is alive. Then, take the truck to a pit and send it to shred. On the other hand, Alejandro plans with Miguel to meet at night but his mother forbids him since she ordered him to invite Leonora to dinner, all this in order to secure his future with his father's inheritance.
6	"Me estoy enamorando de ti"	14 October 2019	28 October 2019	2.6	1.19
Leonora confesses to Alejandro what she feels for him. José Carlos assures Catalina that he will take the Larios fortune.
7	"Apariencias"	15 October 2019	29 October 2019	2.4	1.23
José Carlos asks Alejandro to end Catalina's imposition. Miguel is determined to go to Chile. After the investigator gave Catalina all the photos and her son's DNA test, the merciless woman gives Josue an electric shock, but she prefers to take out a gun, to shoot him.
8	"Tú no amas a nadie"	16 October 2019	30 October 2019	2.4	1.13
Miguel and Alejandro are willing to fight for their love, but Miguel advises Alejandro that it is time to confront his mother. Ámbar reappears. Leonora agrees to marry Alejandro.
9	"No todos los días se casa un hermano"	17 October 2019	31 October 2019	2.4	1.16
Catalina receives a news that will change the landscape completely, her son confirms that Leonora is pregnant, so she begins with the wedding preparations; However, the most anticipated day for Catalina will be interrupted by Miguel's visit.
10	"La joya más preciada"	18 October 2019	1 November 2019	2.4	1.17
Alejandro and Leonora fight, but Catalina comforts her. Luis and Leonora suffer an accident. Vicky reveals to Catalina that she expects a baby from José Carlos.
11	"Reflejos de Ámbar"	21 October 2019	4 November 2019	2.3	1.24
Catalina and Ámbar face each other again. José Carlos learns that Vicky is pregnant, however a situation will cause her to lose the baby.
12	"Auxilio, ¡me quiere matar!"	22 October 2019	5 November 2019	2.5	1.33
At the psychiatric hospital, Ámbar confesses Catalina's crimes to Francisco and tries to kill Catalina when she tries to humiliate her. José Carlos spies on Leonora and his brother having sex. After Ámbar's attempt to attack Catalina, Francisco believes that Ámbar is crazy.
13	"El cadáver más caro del mundo"	23 October 2019	6 November 2019	2.4	1.41
Diego's mistakes will cause Catalina to take action on the matter. José Carlos asks Luis to continue the investigation of Sierra Leone. To relax, Leonora decides to swim for a while, but she is surprised by José Carlos; However, Catalina sees this encounter and forbids her to have contact with her brother-in-law.
14	"Piedras de pasión"	24 October 2019	7 November 2019	2.6	1.17
José Carlos travels to Sierra Leone to investigate the diamond trafficking. Ámbar finally manages to communicate with Alejandro and confesses that Carlos is not his father, because of the call, Catalina visits Ámbar to confront her and gives her an injection.
15	"Eres una basura de persona"	25 October 2019	8 November 2019	2.5	1.18
While Catalina is kidnapped by Diego, he tells her that he will end his life and sexually abuse her. Meanwhile, José Carlos is installed in Sierra Leone, receives a call from Diego, telling him that Catalina is the ringleader of diamond traffic. Commander Omar Vega, along with the police rescue Catalina, but Diego manages to escape. The next day, Catalina meets José Carlos who has just arrived from Sierra Leone, and asks her what she knows about Diego and the diamond trade, so she cynically confesses to Carlos Larios himself, she was the leader of the network before he died Alejandro meets Miguel, and tells him that as soon as the baby is born, he will be free to go with him. Leonora begins to have contractions and tries to locate Alejandro; José Carlos and Gélica help take her to the hospital, but childbirth is complicated and they are in the operating room.
16	"Édgar Larios"	28 October 2019	11 November 2019	2.3	1.37
Little Édgar Larios arrives in the world. Leonora suffers complications in childbirth. Shortly after, she and her son are successfully restored. Amber wakes up, trying to reveal the truth. Diego quotes José Carlos to give him the tests to sink Catalina. Alejandro seems to care neither Leonora nor his son and prefers to spend the afternoon with Miguel. Álvaro follows Alejandro and discovers his double life. Call Leonora posing as someone mysterious to confess that her husband is cheating on her. With the help of Commander Vega, Catalina captures Diego and makes him see his luck for having betrayed her.
17	"Esto cada vez se pone peor"	29 October 2019	12 November 2019	2.6	1.37
Finally, Amber confesses the truth about Catalina; Alejandro is Francisco's son. Both Alejandro and Francisco explode against Catalina after 25 years of deception. The possession of the inheritance is now in danger, because Alejandro is not the biological son of the late Carlos Larios. José Carlos reveals his love to Leonora and also promises Catalina to see her behind bars as soon as possible. Leonora receives mysterious calls by Álvaro, who gives her the address of the place where her faultless husband is. Leonora shows up at the construction company and inexorably finds Alejandro kissing with Miguel.
18	"Matar dos pájaros de un tiro"	30 October 2019	13 November 2019	2.4	1.37
After discovering the hard truth, Leonora takes her son and leaves the house of the Larios, injured by the deceit of Alejandro and Catalina. José Carlos meets with Bustamante, the prosecutor who is following the investigation against Gothier, and they gather enough evidence to sink the family emporium. Catalina visits Leonora at Luis's house, to talk about Alejandro and Miguel. Leonora, with an unstoppable determination, confronts her son's grandmother and emphasizes the disgust she causes for ruining her life and that of her son, in addition to making it clear that, if she tries to take her baby, she must first kill her . Upon leaving the prosecution accompanied by José Carlos, Bustamante is riddled by multiple hitmen, by order of Catalina Creel. Miguel quotes Leonora in his construction company to explain how everything happened, but Catalina goes ahead to confront Miguel and put an end to his life at the moment he throws it from the building under construction. Everything is witnessed and videotaped by Álvaro Espejel.
19	"La justicia tendrá que decidir"	31 October 2019	18 November 2019	2.4	1.38
Alejandro arrives at the construction company to recognize the body of his beloved Miguel, after the tragedy caused by Catalina. By order of Catherine, Commander Vega will bring the full weight of the law to the considered murderer of the architect Terranova. José Carlos warns Luis to run away with Leonora. She is convinced to go to declare to the authorities what happened last night, without knowing that the evil Catalina Creel has left some evidence that incriminate her. Alejandro tries to take his life with a gun. In the Public Ministry, Leonora is found guilty and is locked up being separated from her son. Alejandro, with little Édgar in his arms, visits Leonora in the prison and makes it clear that he will never see his son again for having taken the life of the man he loved.
20	"Pena máxima"	1 November 2019	19 November 2019	2.5	1.64
The preliminary trial begins in which the evidence manipulated by Catalina comes to light, showing that Leonora murdered Miguel Terranova. The judge dictates a formal prison order, and José Carlos cannot avoid the judge's order. In the prison, Leonora is ruthlessly tortured by Catalina's influence. Álvaro runs away from home when he senses that they will disappear because of the test he managed to get at the moment when Catalina pushed Miguel. José Carlos and Luis believe they have the witness who will get Leonora out of prison. They find Álvaro and chase him until he is captured to confess the truth: Catalina Creel is the real murderer.
21	"Pruebas de inocencia"	4 November 2019	20 November 2019	2.6	1.37
José Carlos offers Mr. Figueroa to help defend Leonora with evidence to prove his innocence. Catalina kidnaps Álvaro, but later, the woman cuts his tongue and Omar murders him. Leonora appears at the hearing before the judge and pleads guilty to Miguel's death, alleging that his death was an accident. Before the judge gives the final verdict, José Carlos interrupts him by showing him the video that Álvaro recorded in which it is revealed how Catalina throws Miguel in a vacuum, which, the judge suspends the hearing while evaluating the evidence. Alejandro learns through José Carlos that his mother killed Miguel, which arrives at his house to confront Catalina, repudiating her mother; assures you that you will see her in jail. When the police arrive to take Catalina away, Gélica grabs the gloves of the secret altar she has from her, and blames herself for the crime in front of everyone, so she is arrested.
22	"Siempre me has tenido miedo"	5 November 2019	21 November 2019	2.7	1.47
Catalina visits Gélica in jail just to assure her that she has never reciprocated her love, and gives her money to survive in jail. Gélica is shattered and with a broken heart. Later, José Carlos visits her and she affirms that he is not guilty that Catalina has lost her eye, telling her the story of how it actually happened. After making that confession to José Carlos, Gélica takes his life in his cell.
23	"Siempre hay una salida"	6 November 2019	22 November 2019	2.6	1.32
Amber visits Leonora at José Carlos's house, and warns him about the danger that Catalina has as an enemy: she is capable of any atrocity, so she gives him a gun so Leonora can defend herself. At the request of Amber herself, Catalina receives the ashes of Gélica. Alejandro learns about the tragic death of Álvaro, and Luis confirms that Catalina was the one who eliminated him. José Carlos and Leonora get carried away by their feelings. Francisco confesses to Catalina that he is determined to face justice and gives him the opportunity to flee. Catalina catches him again in his networks, and also prepares a surprise for José Carlos, who is willing to travel to Sierra Leone again.
24	"Al final solo vas a quedar tú"	7 November 2019	25 November 2019	2.7	1.66
Catalina orders to place an explosive in one of the turbines of the plane in which José Carlos will travel to Sierra Leone. Things get out of control when Alejandro asks his brother to go to Gothier for a scandal with the press. The illustrious Mr. Larios is the one who takes the flight to Sierra Leone, in order to end the mines where diamonds are illegally extracted. Life makes Catalina a bad move when she discovers that it is her son who is about to die. Alejandro apologizes to José Carlos and take care of Leonora and little Édgar. The explosive takes effect destroying a turbine and the two engines of the aircraft, causing it to fall into the sea at the midpoint of the Atlantic Ocean. The Larios family breaks before the tragedy. Commander Vega pays the consequences at the hands of Catalina, who demanded to make sure that José Carlos got on the plane, and not his now deceased son.
25	"Mi pequeño Alejandro"	8 November 2019	26 November 2019	3.1	1.70
Francisco warns Catalina that the police already have an arrest warrant against her so she has time to flee. Catalina still has an outstanding debt receivable: visit Leonora to snatch her son; Leonora encañona and threatens to give her a shot before trying to take Édgar. José Carlos warns Francisco that there is also an arrest warrant against him. In the confrontation, one of Catalina's men removes the weapon from Leonora and Catalina hits her, leaving her unconscious. Before fleeing with the baby in his hands, Catalina shoots Luis, when he tried to prevent his escape with the child. Luis is taken to the emergency room and has an operation for the shot. Catalina meets with Francisco to run away together, but discovers by his own words that it was he who gave the tests to José Carlos of each ruse they made together, so he coils him with his vehicle, with which he subsequently flees to Acapulco. José Carlos intuits that Catalina will escape on the yacht she has in Acapulco. Together with the police they go straight to capture her, but Leonora goes ahead to confront once again the limitless evil of her mother-in-law. Catalina stops her and locks her on the yacht. The next day, Catalina puts on board the yacht towards the open sea. Leonora, pawned and gagged, wakes up and tries to flee. The police and José Carlos get on another yacht to stop it. Luis wakes up from the operation, in the company of his ex-wife and son. Catalina takes Leonora to the shore of the yacht as a hostage, while José Carlos, along with the police, asks him to make an exchange: his life for Leonora's. Catalina moves her next chess piece when she throws Leonora into the sea and, with little Édgar inside, blows up the yacht with a bomb. José Carlos throws himself in the water to save Leonora. Days later, Amber visits Francisco in prison, who has lost his legs. Knowing that he will remember all his life the martyrdom he lived next to his family, Leonora takes José Carlos out of her life. Five years later, Luis tells José Carlos great news. On the beach, José Carlos finds Leonora to reveal that her son is not dead. In a faraway and unimaginable destination, little Édgar (now called Alejandro as his father), plays on board with his mother: Catalina Creel, or at least that is what the child believes, while both see their new life flourish.

=== Special ===
Title	Original release date
"Cuna de lobos: El especial"	12 October 2019
Special dedicated to Catalina Creel, which shows the reasons she has to control everyone, kill and disappear the people who get in her way.

== Awards and nominations ==
Year	Award	Category	Nominated	Result
2020	TVyNovelas Awards	Best Actor	Flavio Medina	Nominated
2020	TVyNovelas Awards	Best Antagonist Actress	Nailea Norvind	Nominated
2020	TVyNovelas Awards	Best Antagonist Actor	Diego Amozurrutia	Nominated
2020	TVyNovelas Awards	Best Leading Actress	Azela Robinson	Nominated
2020	TVyNovelas Awards	Best Co-lead Actress	Paulette Hernández	Nominated
2020	TVyNovelas Awards	Best Direction	Eric Morales and Juan Pablo Blanco	Nominated
2020	TVyNovelas Awards	Best Direction of the Cameras	Armando Zafra and Luis Rodríguez	Nominated
2020	TVyNovelas Awards	Best Musical Theme	"Cuna de lobos" (Pedro Plascencia)	Nominated
