= José María de Tavira =

Mexican film and stage actor (born 1983)

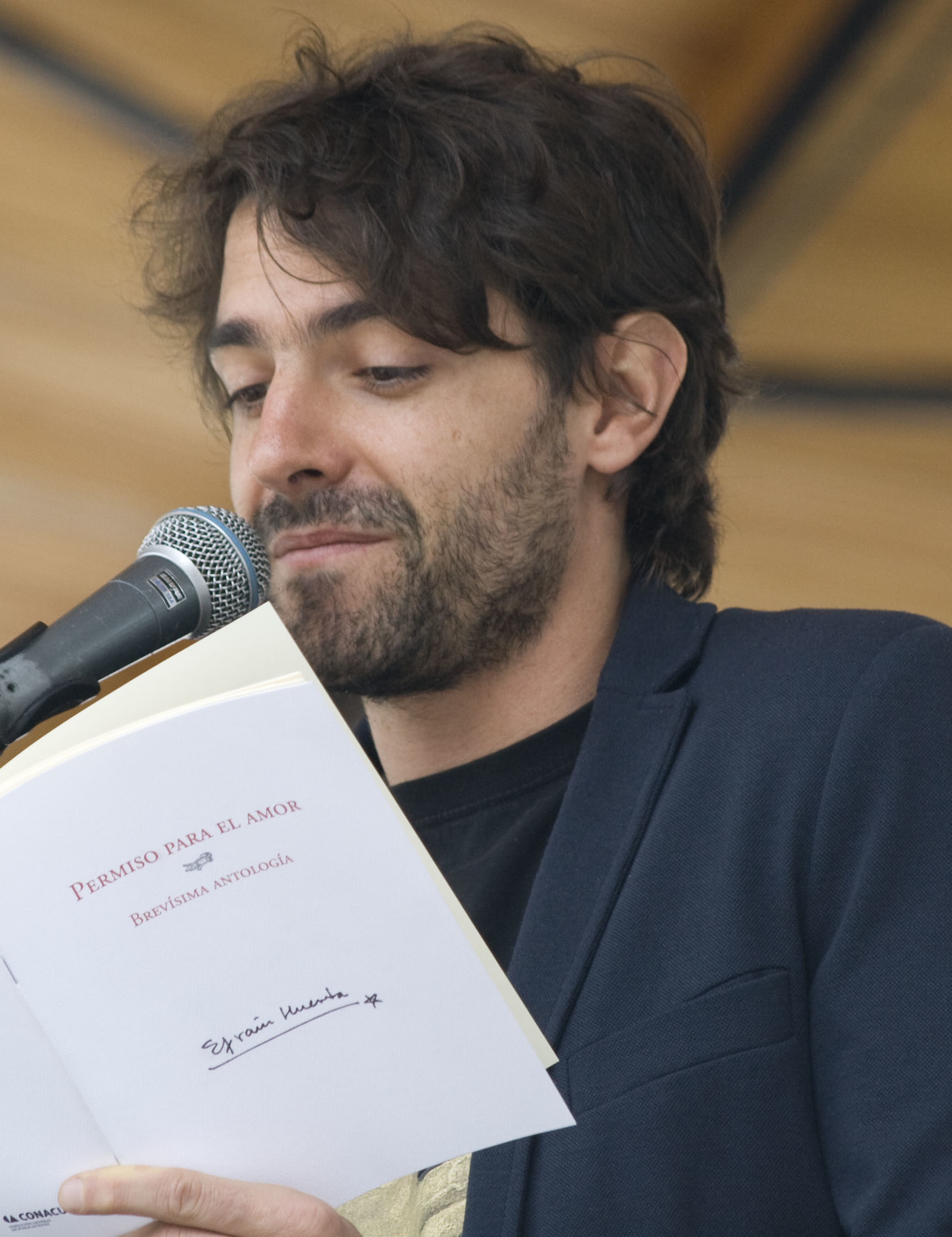
- De Tavira in 2014
- Born: José María de Tavira Bianchi; 27 September 1983 (age 43); Mexico City, Mexico
- Occupation: Actor
- Years active: 1998–present
- Mother: Rosa María Bianchi
- Relatives: Marina de Tavira (cousin)

José María de Tavira Bianchi (born 27 September 1983) is a Mexican film and stage actor.

The son of Mexican theatre director Luis de Tavira and Argentine actress Rosa María Bianchi, he began acting on stage with his parents; at age seven had his first participation in an adaptation of Clotilde en su casa of Jorge Ibargüengoitia, then in 1994 participated in the work Jubileo by Jose Ramon Henríquez. Academy Award nominee Marina de Tavira is José María's cousin.

He made his film debut in The Mask of Zorro playing the main character Alejandro Murrieta (Zorro) as a child. In 2002, he has a brief stint on the Mexican film Amar te duele by Fernando Sariñana. After that he went to London, England, to study drama at Royal Holloway, University of London.

While studying in London, he was called to do a casting for the Mexican comedy Cansada de besar sapos (Tired of Kissing Toads). He played the role of Xavier a stage actor who falls in love with Martha, played by Ana Serradilla. The film was well received by young audiences.

He worked with Fernando Sariñana again in the film Enemigos íntimos as Mauricio co-starring Demián Bichir, Verónica Merchant, Ximena Sariñana, Dolores Heredia and Blanca Sánchez. This movie was shown at the XXIII International Film Festival in Guadalajara.

In September 2008 the film Arráncame la vida (Tear This Heart Out), based on the novel of the Mexican writer Angeles Mastretta, got released in Mexico. In this film he played Carlos Vives, a young leader and lover of Catalina Guzmán, played by Ana Claudia Talancón. This Mexican production had a budget of 6.5 million dollars, was filmed in Puebla and Mexico City with locations in the Palace of Fine Arts and Chapultepec Castle among others.

That same year he presented his short film 100 metros at the VI International Film Festival of Morelia. The film is an adaptation of Harold Pinter's Victoria Station and held in conjunction with his brother Julián de Tavira, both worked on the script, production and directing.

In 2009 is starring Amar a morir as Alejandro Vizcaino. The film tells a love story amid the current disputes in Mexico. Also starring Martina García and Alberto Estrella.

In 2016 he appeared in the Mexican version of Rosario Tijeras as one of the main characters.

== Filmography ==
=== Film roles ===
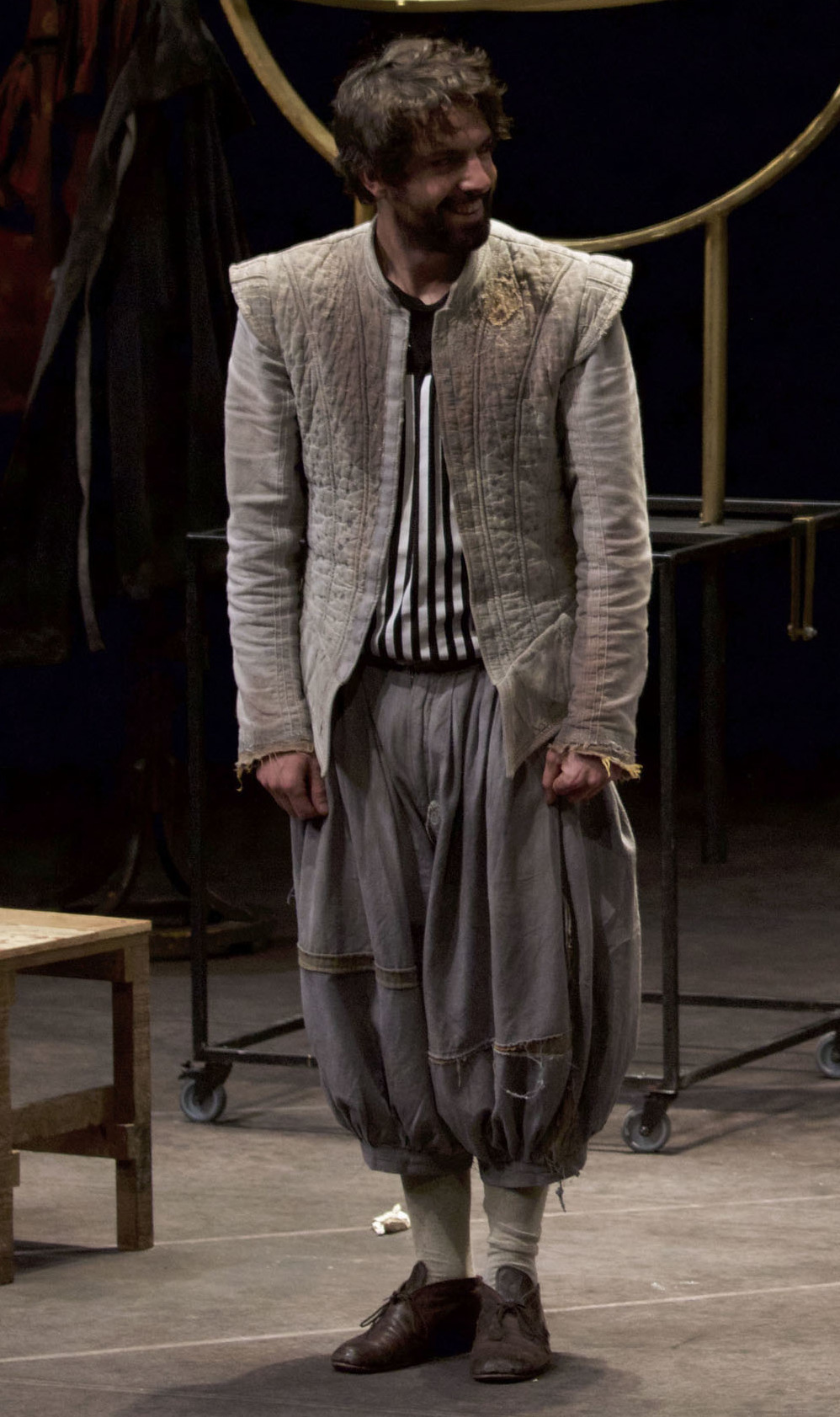
De Tavira in the 2017 play La desobediencia de Marte

Year	Title	Roles	Notes
1998	The Mask of Zorro	Young Alejandro Murrieta	
2002	Amar te duele	Alejandro	
2006	Tired of Kissing Frogs	Javier Martín	
2008	Tear This Heart Out	Carlos Vives	
2009	Amar a morir	Alejandro Vizcaino	
2010	The Imperialists Are Still Alive!	Javier	
2010	El atentado	Álvaro Mateos	
2010	El baile de San Juan	Pedro Giovanni Marani Tepochteca	
2014	The Oasis	Cupid	Short film
2014	Tierra de sangre	Leandro	
2014	Me quedo contigo	Diego	
2016	Qué pena tu vida	Javier	
2018	Deadtectives	Javier	
2019	Como novio de pueblo	Diego	
2019	Perdida	Eric	

=== Television roles ===
Year	Title	Roles	Notes
2011	Niño Santo	Damián	
2012	La Clínica	Elvicio Pacheco	
2015	El capitán Camacho	Young Captain Carlos Camacho	
2015	Señorita Pólvora	Vicente Martínez	Main role; 68 episodes
2016–2017	El Vato	Rogelio Galeana	4 episodes
2016–2018	Rosario Tijeras	Antonio Bethancourt	Lead role (seasons 1–2); 127 episodes
2018	Malinche	Hernán Cortés	5 episodes
2019	Diablo Guardián	Jaime	Episode: "En busca de mi Camaro amarillo"
2020	El Candidato	Lalo Yzaguirre	Main role; 10 episodes
2021	Fuego ardiente	Fernando Alcocer	Lead role
