= Tired of Kissing Frogs =

2006 film

- Directed by: Lisa Reino
- Starring: Ana Serradilla; José María de Tavira
- Production companies: Miravista; Bazooka Films; Santo Domingo Films
- Distributed by: Buena Vista International
- Release date: 20 December 2006
- Running time: 1h 35min
- Country: Mexico
- Language: Spanish

Tired of Kissing Frogs (Spanish: Cansada de besar sapos) is a 2006 Mexican comedy film directed by Lisa Reino.

== Cast ==
- Ana Serradilla - Martha
- José María de Tavira - Xavier
- Juan Manuel Bernal - Roberto
- Carlos de la Mota - Miguel El Mammer
- Itatí Cantoral - Ceci
- Pedro Damián: Polo
