= Vuelve temprano (Mexican TV series) =

- Genre: Telenovela
- Based on: Vuelve temprano by Daniella Castagno
- Written by: Verónica Bellve; Daniella Castagno; Joaquín Guerrero Casasola
- Story by: Daniella Castagno
- Directed by: Victor Hugo Martinez; Moisés Ortiz Urquidi; Agustin Restrepo
- Creative directors: Esmeralda Barrón; Carlos Herrera
- Starring: Gabriela de la Garza; Mario Cimarro; Rubén Zamora; Sharis Cid; Francisco de la O; Carlos Ferro; Sara Corrales; Alejandro Durán
- Country of origin: Mexico
- Original language: Spanish
- No. of episodes: 100

Production
- Executive producers: Eric Reid; Carlos Resendi; Agustin Restrepo
- Producer: Aurelio Valcárcel Carroll
- Cinematography: Miguel Del Valle Prieto; Jorge Rubio Cazarín
- Editor: Perla Martínez
- Production company: Argos Comunicación

Original release
- Network: Imagen Televisión
- Release: October 17, 2016 – February 28, 2017

Vuelve temprano (English: Don't Be Late), is a Mexican telenovela created by Grupo Imagen Multimedia and Argos Comunicación for Imagen Televisión. It is based on the homonymous telenovela produced by Televisión Nacional de Chile in 2014.

The series is starring Gabriela de la Garza as Clara, Mario Cimarro as Inspector Antonio, Rubén Zamora as Santiago, Sharis Cid as Maité, Francisco de la O as Francisco, Carlos Ferro as Agente Manuel, Sara Corrales as Denisse and Alejandro Durán as Hans.

== Plot ==
"Vuelve temprano" tells the story of Clara and Santiago, a couple who seems to have the perfect life until everything collapses and they realize that they know their children much less than they believed.

== Cast ==
=== Main ===
- Gabriela de la Garza as Clara Zavaleta
- Mario Cimarro as Inspector Antonio Avelica
- Rubén Zamora as Santiago Urrutia
- Sharis Cid as Maité Soler
- Francisco de la O as Francisco Valenzuela
- Carlos Ferro as Agente Manuel Carvallo
- Sara Corrales as Denisse Moya "Candy"
- Alejandro Durán as Hans Troncoso

==== Secondary ====
- Sophie Gómez as Fiscal Loreto Rodríguez
- Alejandra Ambrosi as Renata Zavaleta
- Alejandro Caso as Miguel
- Cristina Rodlo as Isabel Urrutia Zavaleta
- Julia Urbini as Florencia Urrutia Zavaleta
- Andrés Delgado as Pablo Valenzuela Soler
- Christian Vázquez as Gabriel Castro
- Estela Calderón as Estrella Herrero
- Daniel Barona as Ignacio Urrutia
- Adriana Lumina as Catalina Garza
- Palmeira Cruz as Ingrid Parra
- Teresa Pavé
- Adriana Leal as Sofía Herrera
- Flor Payán

== Episodes ==
No.	Title	Original release date
1	"¡Primer capítulo impactante de Vuelve temprano!"	October 18, 2016
2	"¿De quién es la sudadera verde?"	October 19, 2016
3	"¿De dónde salieron esos 200,000 pesos?"	October 19, 2016
4	"Estás arrestado por obstaculizar la justicia"	October 21, 2016
5	"Judas"	October 21, 2016
6	"Ajuste de cuentas"	October 24, 2016
7	"La reconstruction de los hechos"	October 25, 2016
8	"Lo nuestro no era serio"	October 26, 2016
9	"Nuevos indicios"	October 21, 2016
10	"Llamadas"	October 21, 2016
11	"La extorsión"	October 31, 2016
12	"Basta, Renata"	October 31, 2016
13	"¡Sorpresa, Clara!"	November 1, 2016
14	"Traiciones"	November 1, 2016
15	"Testigos"	November 3, 2016
16	"Memoria"	November 3, 2016
17	"El soplón"	November 4, 2016
18	"Jacinto"	November 4, 2016
19	"Revelaciones"	November 7, 2016
20	"Candy"	November 8, 2016
21	"Se apagó la luz"	November 9, 2016
22	"Engaños"	November 10, 2016
23	"La advertencia"	November 11, 2016
24	"Tenemos algo, Manuel"	November 14, 2016
25	"Tratos y trata"	November 15, 2016
26	"Se ofrece recompensa"	November 16, 2016
27	"Ya sé quién mató a Nacho"	November 17, 2016
28	"Aléjate de los Urrutia"	November 18, 2016
29	"Rompecabezas"	November 22, 2016
30	"El operativo"	November 22, 2016
31	"La grabación"	November 23, 2016
32	"El secuestro de Clara"	November 24, 2016
33	"Nuevas pistas"	November 28, 2016
34	"Confesiones"	November 28, 2016
35	"Caso cerrado"	November 29, 2016
36	"El premio"	November 30, 2016
37	"Barbie"	December 1, 2016
38	"Difamación"	December 2, 2016
39	"La entrevista"	December 5, 2016
40	"El arresto"	December 6, 2016
41	"Escopolamina"	December 7, 2016
42	"Confesiones"	December 8, 2016
43	"Infidelidad"	December 9, 2016
44	"Agarra tus cosas, Denisse"	December 12, 2016
45	"Juez Osorio"	December 13, 2016
46	"Golpes"	December 14, 2016
47	"Revelaciones"	December 15, 2016
48	"Un pedacito de Ignacio"	December 16, 2016
49	"Lealtad"	December 19, 2016
50	"Oso"	December 20, 2016
51	"Frente a frente"	December 21, 2016
52	"Bromas"	December 22, 2016
53	"Mariposa"	December 23, 2016
54	"Feliz cumpleaños, Nacho"	December 26, 2016
55	"Alerta Amber"	December 27, 2016
56	"Confiesa tus crímenes"	December 28, 2016
57	"Abuelos"	December 29, 2016
58	"Hans está muerto"	December 30, 2016
59	"La mentira nunca es buena"	January 2, 2017
60	"Un infiltrado"	January 3, 2017
61	"Confesiones"	January 4, 2017
62	"Que vivan los novios"	January 5, 2017
63	"Un arresto importante"	January 6, 2017
64	"El juez"	January 9, 2017
65	"León rojo"	January 10, 2017
66	"Un hombre casado"	January 11, 2017
67	"Confesiones"	January 12, 2017
68	"Nos partiste en pedazos"	January 13, 2017
69	"La venganza en Hans"	January 16, 2017
70	"Sin salida"	January 17, 2017
71	"Infiltrado"	January 18, 2017
72	"Atrapados"	January 19, 2017
73	"Chivo expiatorio"	January 20, 2017
74	"Agente Avelica"	January 23, 2017
75	"Doble juego"	January 24, 2017
76	"La explosión"	January 25, 2017
77	"Te maté, Julia"	January 26, 2017
78	"El rescate"	January 27, 2017
79	"Sobredosis por escopolamina"	January 30, 2017
80	"Mateo"	January 31, 2017
81	"Susy o ellas"	February 1, 2017
82	"Ropa sucia"	February 2, 2017
83	"Recuerdos"	February 3, 2017
84	"Extorsión"	February 6, 2017
85	"Yo no me vendo"	February 7, 2017
86	"Inculpado"	February 8, 2017
87	"Llamada anónima"	February 9, 2017
88	"Declárate culpable"	February 10, 2017
89	"El funeral"	February 13, 2017
90	"Como un verdadero héroe"	February 14, 2017
91	"Eres libre, Clara"	February 15, 2017
92	"No somos nada"	February 16, 2017
93	"Estoy orgullosa de ti"	February 17, 2017
94	"24 horas"	February 20, 2017
95	"Cony fue una joven valiente"	February 21, 2017
96	"Tenemos el ADN de León Rojo"	February 22, 2017
97	"¿Quién es León Rojo?"	February 23, 2017
98	"Debes eligir, Hans"	February 24, 2017
99	"La noche en la que murió Nacho"	February 27, 2017
100	"¡Mataste a mi hijo!"	February 28, 2017
