= Miss Bala (2019 film) =

2019 film directed by Catherine Hardwicke

- Theatrical release poster
- Directed by: Catherine Hardwicke
- Screenplay by: Gareth Dunnett-Alcocer
- Based on: Miss Bala by Gerardo Naranjo; Mauricio Katz
- Produced by: Pablo Cruz; Kevin Misher
- Starring: Gina Rodriguez; Ismael Cruz Córdova; Anthony Mackie
- Cinematography: Patrick Murguia
- Edited by: Terilyn A. Shropshire
- Music by: Alex Heffes
- Production companies: Columbia Pictures; Canana Films; Misher Films
- Distributed by: Sony Pictures Releasing
- Release date: February 1, 2019 (United States)
- Running time: 104 minutes
- Countries: United States; Mexico
- Languages: English; Spanish
- Budget: $15 million
- Box office: $15.4 million

Miss Bala (English: "Miss Bullet") is a 2019 action thriller film directed by Catherine Hardwicke and written by Gareth Dunnet-Alcocer, based on the 2011 Mexican film of the same name. The film stars Gina Rodriguez, Ismael Cruz Córdova, and Anthony Mackie, and follows a woman who trains to take down a Mexican drug cartel after her friend is kidnapped.

The film was released in the United States on February 1, 2019, by Columbia Pictures, in Dolby Cinema. The film was a box office failure, grossing $15.4 million worldwide against a $15 million production budget. While Rodriguez's performance received some praise, critics compared the film unfavorably to the original, saying it suffered from "bland action and predictable story beats".

== Plot ==
In Tijuana, makeup artist Gloria Fuentes visits her best friend Suzu Ramós. Gloria and Suzu plan to enter the upcoming "Miss Baja California" beauty pageant, and hope to improve their chances by impressing the influential municipal police chief Rafael Saucedo at a nightclub. While Gloria is in the bathroom, the nightclub is attacked by gunmen and Gloria is separated from Suzu, who disappears in the chaos. Gloria reports Suzu's disappearance to the police and accompanies an officer to search for her, but the officer abandons Gloria in a remote area, where she is kidnapped by Las Estrellas, the cartel behind the nightclub attack.

Gloria is brought before Las Estrellas's leader, Lino Esparza, who offers to help Gloria find Suzu if she agrees to work for them, as her American citizenship makes her useful; she reluctantly agrees. After committing a car bombing as an initiation, Gloria is entered into the Miss Baja pageant. However, she is later captured by the Drug Enforcement Administration officer Brian Reich, who threatens Gloria with a lengthy prison sentence unless she agrees to help him and become an informant in exchange for not being prosecuted for the crime.

Gloria accompanies Lino to an exchange of money and drugs for weapons with Jimmy, an American illegal arms dealer. Gloria informs Reich, who leads a police tactical unit to intervene in the transaction, resulting in a shootout that jeopardizes Gloria's safety; Reich reveals he never intended to help her, as the car bombing she helped commit killed DEA agents. Lino tries to save Gloria but is shot in the leg; Gloria decides to save him, and they flee in a car while Lino's men hold off the police and kill Reich. Lino and Gloria begin to bond.

Later, Lino tasks Gloria with assassinating Saucedo, and presents video evidence that Suzu was kidnapped at the nightclub and auctioned off into forced prostitution under Saucedo's corrupt watch. Gloria agrees and, as part of the plan, wins the Miss Baja pageant when Lino bribes the judges, securing her an invitation to an after-party hosted by Saucedo. Gloria agrees to spend the night with Saucedo, making sure Lino knows where to find him. However, she runs into Suzu at the party and realizes it was Lino, not Saucedo, who sold Suzu into prostitution. Gloria warns Saucedo of the assassination plot just before Las Estrellas attacks the party. Retrieving a rifle from a dying corrupt officer, Gloria searches for Suzu in the chaos and finds her outside, just as Saucedo tries using her as a human shield; Gloria shoots Saucedo in the leg, forcing him to release Suzu and allowing Lino to kill him. Gloria then holds Lino at gunpoint, telling him she knows the truth about Suzu and the prostitution racket, and shoots him dead when he tries to pull a gun on her.

Police reinforcements arrive and Gloria and Suzu are arrested. Gloria is taken to an interrogation room where she is met by Jimmy, who reveals himself to be an undercover Central Intelligence Agency operative tasked with dismantling Mexican cartels involved in international crime. Jimmy and Gloria make a deal: Suzu will be released and both of them will be cleared of all charges, while Gloria will work as a CIA asset to infiltrate the cartels. After being released, Gloria drives Suzu back to her family and leaves with Jimmy for her first assignment.

== Cast ==
- Gina Rodriguez as Gloria Fuentes, a makeup artist from Los Angeles.
- Ismael Cruz Córdova as Lino Esparza, the chief of Las Estrellas, a gang from Tijuana.
- Matt Lauria as Brian Reich, a DEA agent who suspects Gloria to be a part of the cartel.
- Ricardo Abarca as Pollo, Lino's main henchman.
- Cristina Rodlo as Suzu Ramós, Gloria's best friend who lives in Tijuana and a competitor on the Miss Baja California pageant.
- Sebastián Cano as Chava Ramós, Suzu's little brother who lives with her.
- Damián Alcázar as Rafael Saucedo, the chief of Tijuana's municipal police.
- Anthony Mackie as Jimmy, a gangster from San Diego, who is secretly a CIA agent.
- Aislinn Derbez as Isabel, a woman abducted by Las Estrellas.
- Lilian Guadalupe Tapia Robles as Doña Rosita, a woman who works for Las Estrellas.
- Erick Rene Delgadillo Urbina as Tucán, Lino's henchman.
- Mikhail Plata as Chivo, Lino's henchman.
- Jorge Humberto Millan Mardueño as Ortiz, Lino's henchman.
- Thomas Dekker as Justin, Gloria's boss in Los Angeles.
- José Sefami as Don Ramon, a man who work for Rafael Saucedo.
- Gaby Orihuela as the coordinator of the Miss Baja California pageant.
- Roberto Sosa as a police officer who secretly works for Las Estrellas.

== Production ==
In April 2017, it was announced Catherine Hardwicke would direct the film, from a screenplay by Gareth Dunnet-Alcocer, with Kevin Misher and Pablo Cruz producing the film, with Andy Berman serving as an executive producer on the film. In May 2017, Gina Rodriguez and Ismael Cruz Córdova joined the cast of the film. In July 2017, Matt Lauria, Cristina Rodlo, and Aislinn Derbez joined the cast of the film. Anthony Mackie later joined the cast of the film. The cast and crew are said to be 95 percent Latino. Sony reportedly spent $15 million producing the film.

== Release ==
The film was released in the United States on February 1, 2019, after having previously been set for a January 25, 2019 release. It was in the United Kingdom on February 8, 2019.

== Reception ==
=== Box office ===
Miss Bala has grossed $15 million in the United States and Canada, and $173,237 in other territories, for a worldwide gross of $15.2 million, against a production budget of $15 million.

In the United States and Canada, Miss Bala was projected to gross $6–9 million from 2,203 theaters in its opening weekend. It made $2.8 million on its first day, including $650,000 from Thursday night previews. It went on to debut to $6.7 million, finishing third at the box office. Deadline Hollywood wrote that given its $15 million production budget, an opening of $10–12 million would've been an ideal start in order for the film to turn a profit. It fell 60% in its second weekend to $2.7 million, finishing 10th.

=== Critical response ===
On review aggregator Rotten Tomatoes, the film holds an approval rating of 22% based on 114 reviews, with an average rating of 4.6/10. The website's critical consensus reads, "Miss Bala suggests Gina Rodriguez has a future as an action hero; unfortunately, it also demonstrates how hard it is to balance set pieces against a compelling story." On Metacritic, the film has a weighted average score of 41 out of 100, based on 30 critics, indicating "mixed or average reviews". Audiences polled by CinemaScore gave the film an average grade of "B" on an A+ to F scale, while those at PostTrak gave it an average 3.5 out of 5 stars; social media monitor RelishMix noted online responses to the film were "mixed-to-negative".

Richard Roeper, writing for the Chicago Sun-Times was critical of the film, saying, "Run away from Gina Rodriguez's ludicrous drug running shoot-em-up... Miss Bala is an early contender for a spot on my list of the worst movies of 2019."
