= Joe Menendez =

American film and television director (born 1969)

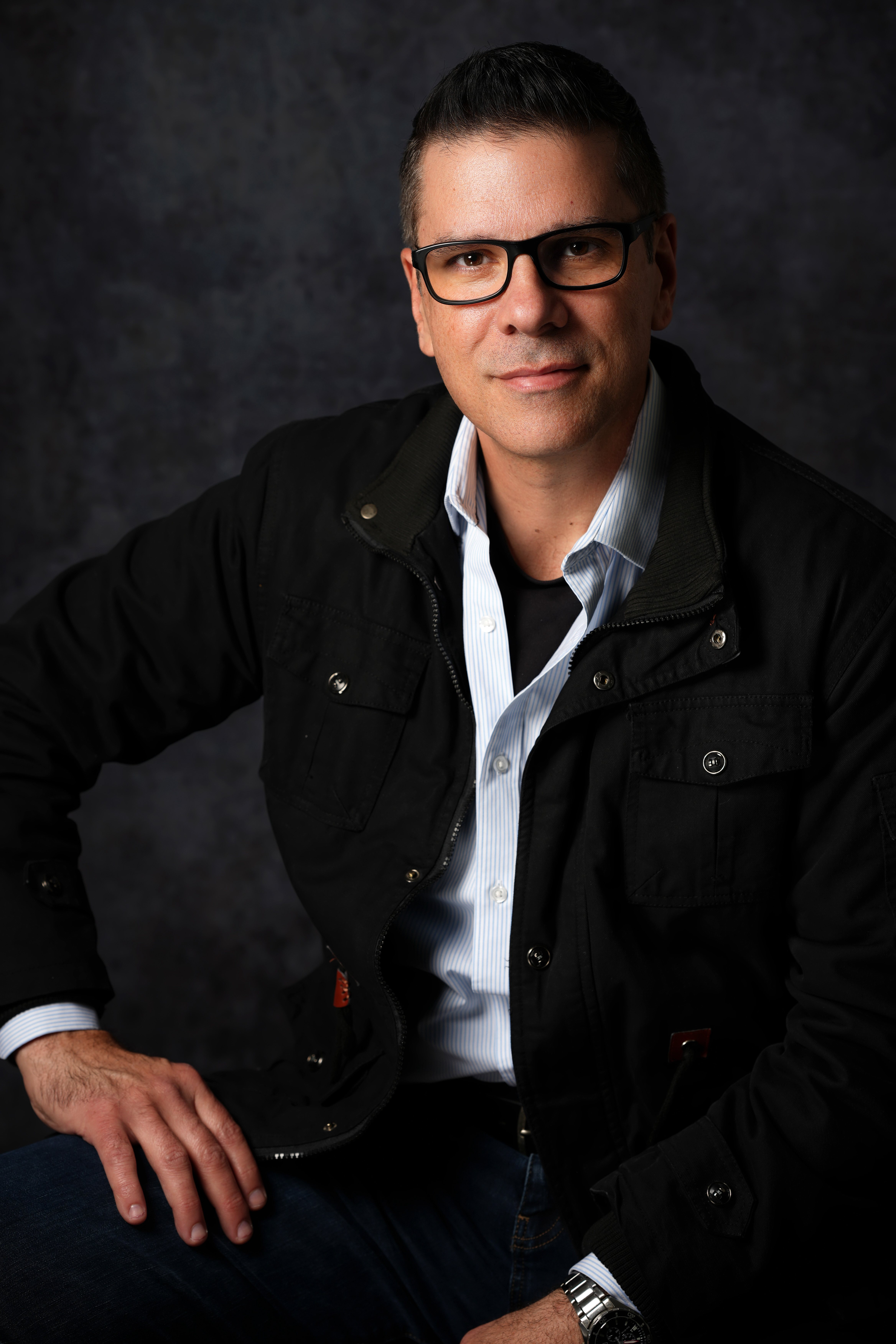
- Born: New York City, U.S.
- Occupations: Film and TV director, film and TV producer, screenwriter, film editor, author
- Years active: 1992 –present
- Notable work: Star Trek: Picard, Elsbeth, Evil, Snowpiercer, Henry Danger: The Movie, Kung Fu, Siren, Legends of the Hidden Temple, From Dusk till Dawn: The Series, 12 Monkeys
- Website: Official Joe Menendez website

Joe Menendez is an American film and television director, who has moved between the film and TV medium his entire career. Menendez has directed 125 hours of television, written a handful of teleplays, produced several TV series and films, and has directed ten feature films and TV movies so far.

Menendez was born in New York City and raised in Miami. He is of Cuban descent.

== Career ==
=== Television ===
Joe Menendez has directed episodes of Star Trek: Picard, Elsbeth, Evil, Snowpiercer, Quantum Leap, Kung Fu, Siren,12 Monkeys and Queen of the South and From Dusk till Dawn: The Series for Robert Rodriguez's El Rey, including the series finale, which is based on the 1996 Rodriguez film From Dusk till Dawn written by Quentin Tarantino.

He's also directed episodes for Blumhouse Productions' anthology series 12 Deadly Days for YouTube Red Menendez has also directed episodes of the Amazon Studios series, Just Add Magic, and episodes for the second season of the series East Los High for Hulu

Even though Menendez has branched out to drama, he occasionally still works in the family space, where he spent the bulk of his early career. Since the year 2000, Menendez directed multiple episodes for various Nickelodeon shows including 100 Things to Do Before High School, Big Time Rush, True Jackson VP, Just Jordan, Unfabulous, Ned's Declassified School Survival Guide, Taina, and The Brothers Garcia, for which he won an ALMA Award for OUTSTANDING DIRECTING IN A COMEDY in 2001. Menendez also directed several episodes of Andi Mack and Stuck in the Middle for Disney Channel as well as Kirby Buckets and Zeke and Luther for Disney XD, including the June 15th, 2009 world premiere "Bros Go Pro", which delivered the highest ratings ever for a primetime series premiere on the channel.

From 2007 to 2011, Menendez was a director and/or producer on Disney's Imagination Movers, In addition to directing 22 episodes, Menendez was a Co-Executive Producer on the final season, and Supervising Producer on the second season.

=== Film ===
Menendez is quite prolific in movies too. He directed the Superhero action/comedy feature film Henry Danger: The Movie, which he also Executive Produced, for Nickelodeon Movies and Paramount Plus. It premiered on January 17, 2025, and immediately debuted as the #1 new movie. It remained in the top 5 family movies well over a month after release. He also directed the action-adventure TV movie Legends of the Hidden Temple, which premiered on Nickelodeon on November 26, 2016. The movie is based on the 1990s game show of the same name.

Despite being American-born and raised, three of Menendez's feature film releases have been Spanish language movies, however, he still considers each of them to be an American movie.

Ladrones was released October 9, 2015, by Pantelion Films. The action/comedy reunites an old team of thieves and several new ones for the biggest heist of their lives. The film was shot on location in the Dominican Republic and enjoys a CinemaScore of "A". It debuted #9 at the Mexican box-office, marking the second film Menendez has directed to land in Mexico's Top 10 on its opening weekend.

The film is the sequel to his theatrical debut, the feature film Ladrón que roba a ladrón aka To Rob a Thief which was released by Lionsgate on August 31, 2007. According to the website Metacritic, the film enjoys generally favorable reviews, evidenced by its score of 61%, and does even better on Rotten Tomatoes with a score of 66%. Despite being made for under 2 million dollars, the film made almost 7 million dollars worldwide.

Joe Menendez's third Spanish language film, a romantic comedy called Quiero ser fiel (I WANT TO BE FAITHFUL), a.k.a. POR QUE LOS HOMBRES SON INFIELES? (WHY DO MEN CHEAT?) was released in Latin America in 2014 and was in the top ten of Mexico's box office for two weeks, and made its U.S. debut in March 2016.

In 2002 he made his second feature film, the indie drama HUNTING OF MAN, which Menendez edited, wrote and directed. It won BEST PICTURE at the 2003 New York International Latino Film Festival and the coveted FESTIVAL DIRECTOR AWARD FOR EXCELLENCE at the 2003 Method Fest Independent Film Festival, where Menendez was also nominated for Best Director.

Menendez gathered $10,000 from his family and made his feature film debut with the indie action thriller LORDS OF THE BARRIO (originally titled The Impostor), which was shot in 1995 and 1996 but wasn't released on DVD until 2002.

=== Other work ===
HBO commissioned Menendez in 1994 to write Cinderella for their animated series Happily Ever After: Fairy Tales for Every Child (Menendez also wrote The Twelve Dancing Princesses in 1996 for the same HBO series).

He then landed his first professional gig directing over 20 reenactments for the syndicated reality TV series Real Stories of the Highway Patrol in 1995

From 1996 through 2000, Menendez worked almost exclusively in the Spanish TV world, directing multiple episodes for three different Columbia Tri-Star multi-camera half hours: Los Beltran, VIVA VEGAS and SOLO EN AMERICA, which aired on the Telemundo Network. Menendez also wrote several episodes for Los Beltran.

He was a Staff Writer on the 2003 FOX sitcom, Luis (TV series), and from 2004 through 2005 he directed an episode of Cuts for the network formerly known as UPN, was a Consulting Producer on The Playbook for Spike TV, wrote two episodes for the PBS kids show Dragon Tales, produced a reality TV series for nuvoTV called URBAN JUNGLE, and sold a pilot to Nickelodeon called COUSINS.

== Filmography ==
- Henry Danger: The Movie (2025, feature film, Director)
- Nightclub Secrets (2018, TV movie, Director)
- Legends of the Hidden Temple:The Movie (2016, TV movie, Director)
- Ladrones (2015, feature film, Editor and Director)
- Quiero Ser Fiel (2014, feature film, Editor and Director)
- The Brittany Murphy Story (2014, TV movie, Director)
- 3 Holiday Tails aka A Golden Christmas 2 (2011, TV movie, Director)
- Ladron Que Roba A Ladron aka To Rob a Thief (2007, feature film, Editor and Director)
- Hunting of Man (2003, feature film, Writer, Editor and Director)
- Lords of the Barrio aka The Impostor (2002, feature film, Writer, Editor and Director)
