= Veneno (film) =

2018 Dominican Republic wrestling film

- Film poster
- Spanish: Veneno: Primera caída – El relámpago de Jack
- Directed by: Tabaré Blanchard
- Written by: Riccardo Bardellino; Tabaré Blanchard; Miguel Yarull; Marien Zagarella
- Produced by: Fernando D. Rivas
- Starring: Manny Pérez; Pepe Sierra; Richard Douglas; Yamile Scheker; Xiomara Rodríguez
- Cinematography: Sebastian Cabrera Chelin
- Edited by: Tabaré Blanchard
- Music by: Luichy Guzman
- Production companies: Frío Frío; La visual sonora
- Distributed by: Caribbean Films Distribution; Spanglish Movies
- Release date: 22 February 2018 (Puerto Rico)
- Running time: 96 minutes
- Countries: Dominican Republic; United States
- Languages: Spanish; English

Veneno: Primera caída – El relámpago de Jack ("Veneno: First Fall — Jack's Lightning-Bolt") is a 2018 sports biopic about the Dominican Republic wrestler Jack Veneno. Directed by Tabaré Blanchard and starring Manny Pérez, it is the first part of a planned trilogy.

== Synopsis ==
In the modern day, an uninterested journalist interviews the aged former wrestler and politician Jack Veneno.

In the 1950s, Rafael Antonio Sánchez grows up in poverty in the Dominican Republic under the Trujillo dictatorship. After seeing a film starring the legend professional wrestler El Santo, he and his friend José Manuel Guzmán Marte, a police officer's son, dream of becoming professional wrestlers. They both find success, under the names of "Jack Veneno" and "Relámpago Hernández" respectively, but fighting tests their friendship.

== Production ==
The Veneno trilogy is one of the largest native Dominican Republic productions.

Some liberties were taken with the story; for example, in reality Veneno first saw El Santo at a Ciudad Trujillo cinema with his father, but in the film this was moved to a travelling circus in the town of San José de Ocoa where he spent his earliest years.

== Release ==
The film premiered in the DR on 22 February 2018, and in the US on 13 April.

Veneno represented the Dominican Republic at the 2019 Ariel Awards.

Luichy Guzman's score won the Premio La Silla in 2018.
