= Jack Veneno =

Dominican professional wrestler and politician (1942–2021)

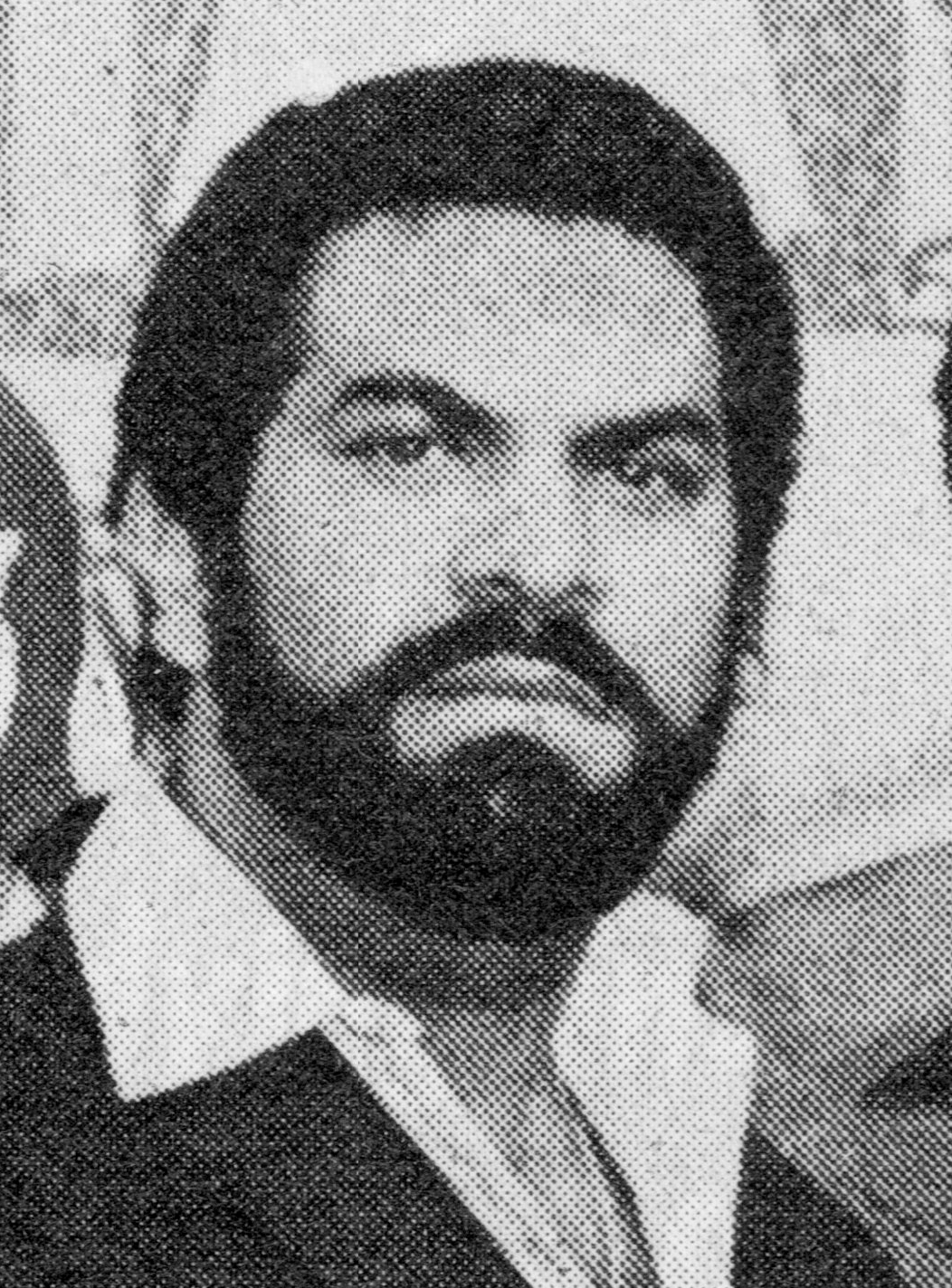
- Veneno in 1982

Personal information
- Born: Rafael Antonio Sánchez; May 2, 1942 San José de Ocoa, Dominican Republic
- Died: April 6, 2021 (aged 78) Dominican Republic

Professional wrestling career
- Ring name(s): El Hijo de Doña Tatica; Jack Veneno
- Billed height: 5 ft 9 in (175 cm)
- Billed weight: 209 lb (95 kg)
- Debut: 1969
- Retired: 2000

Jack Veneno ("Jack Venom"; born Rafael Antonio Sánchez; May 2, 1942 – April 6, 2021) was a Dominican professional wrestler and politician.

== Professional wrestling career ==
He became interested in wrestling as a teen, watching the Mexican luchador El Santo. He debuted in 1969. Also known as "El hijo de Doña Tatica" (Mrs. Tatica's Son), he worked for many years on Color Visión channel 9 during the 1970s, 1980s and 1990s, on a wrestling show called Lucha Libre Internacional. He was the main star of the show as well as the owner of the production company Dominicana de Espectaculos.

On September 7, 1982, Veneno challenged Ric Flair for the NWA World Heavyweight Championship in the Palacio de los Deportes Virgilio Travieso Soto in Santo Domingo in front of an audience of circa 30,000 people. The match ended when Veneno applied his signature sleeper hold to Flair, with the bell ringing to signify the expiration of the match's time limit as Flair's arm dropped for a third time. The fans then celebrated Veneno winning the NWA World Heavyweight Championship. The title change was not recognized by the National Wrestling Alliance. Flair reportedly instructed Veneno to defeat him due to fears of the audience in the oversold arena turning violent if the popular Veneno lost. In the Dominican Republic, Veneno was reported to have surrendered the title back to Flair due to not being willing to leave the country to defend it.

Veneno retired from wrestling in 2000.

== Political career ==
Although retired from wrestling, Veneno ran for Mayor of Santo Domingo Norte, one of the Santo Domingo Province municipalities, on the 2006 Congressional and Municipal Elections with the Institutional Social Democratic Bloc party. In 2007, he was appointed by the Dominican Republic president Leonel Fernández as Vice-Minister of Sports.

== Legacy and death ==
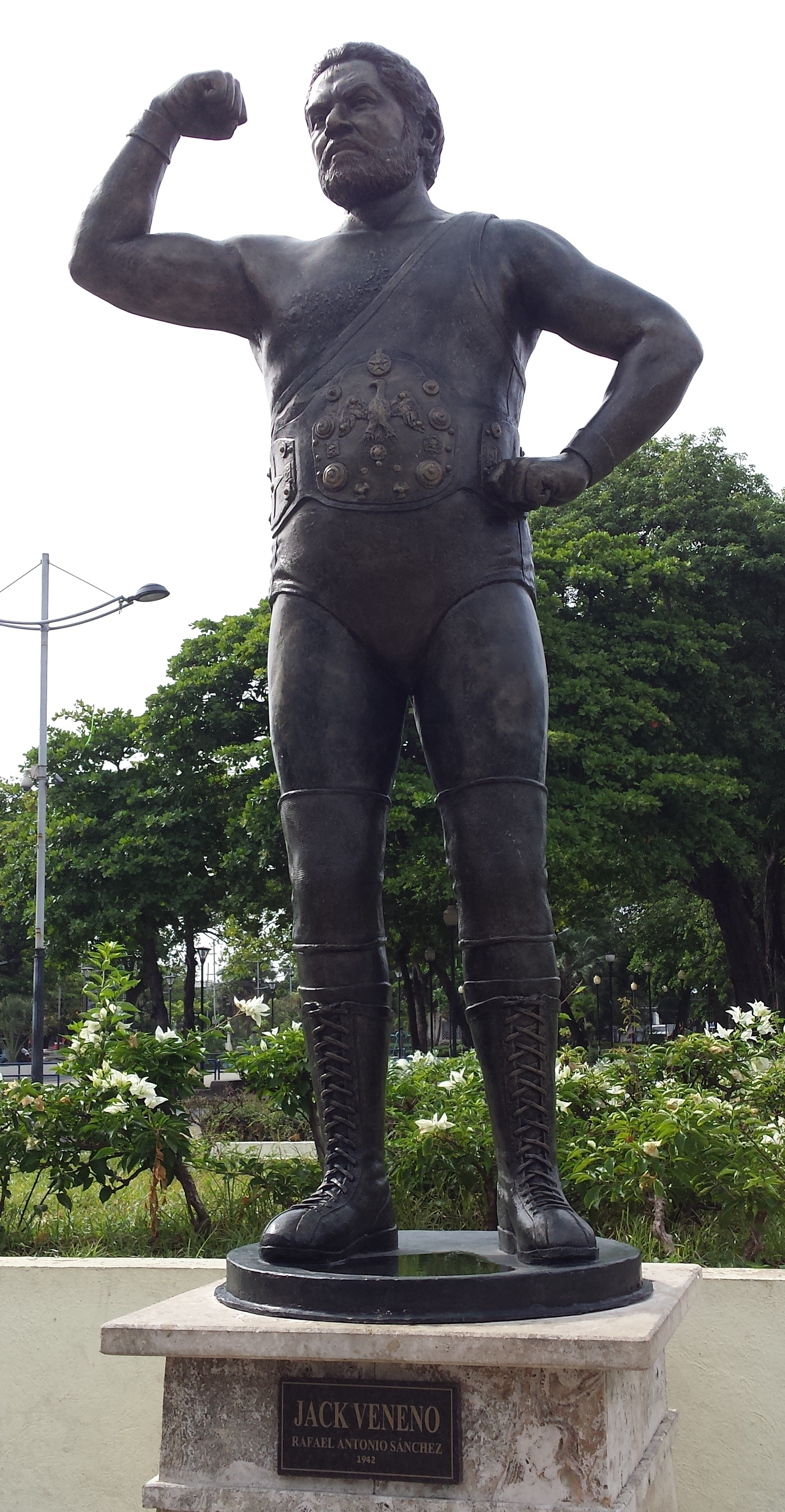
A statue of Veneno in Santo Domingo

A movie trilogy about Veneno's life is planned; the first part was released in 2018.

On April 13, 2019, a statue was unveiled in Veneno's honor in the Eugenio María de Hostos Park in Santo Domingo.

On April 6, 2021, Veneno died from pancreatic cancer, which had metastasized to his lungs. He was 78 years old.

== Championships and accomplishments ==
- Dominicana de Espectaculos
  - Light Heavyweight Championship (6 times)
  - Intercontinental Heavyweight Championship (2 times)
  - World Tag Team Championship (8 times) - with Puño De Hierro (2 times), El Caballero Negro (2 times), Mr. Haiti (1 time), Maravilla (1 time), and Raffy Sanchez (1 time)
- Dominican Wrestling Federation
  - DWF Caribbean Tag Team Championship (1 time) - with Relámpago Hernández
  - DWF Dominican Republic Heavyweight Championship (6 times)
  - Served as Vice-Minister of Sports (2007–2012)
  - National Welterweight Championship (1 time)
- National Wrestling Alliance
  - NWA World Heavyweight Championship (1 time)^{1}
- World Wrestling Council
  - WWC North American Tag-Team Championship (1 times) - with José Rivera

1 Veneno's reign is not recognized by the National Wrestling Alliance.
