= Wedig =

Wedig is a surname. Notable people with the surname include:

- Gottfried Wedig (1583–1641), 17th-century German painter
- Joseph Wedig (1826–???), Member of the Wisconsin State Assembly
- Kasimir Wedig von Bonin (1691–1752), Prussian lieutenant general
- Trey Wedig (born 2002), American football player
- William Wedig (born 1983), American filmmaker
