= Kaves =

American visual artist and rapper

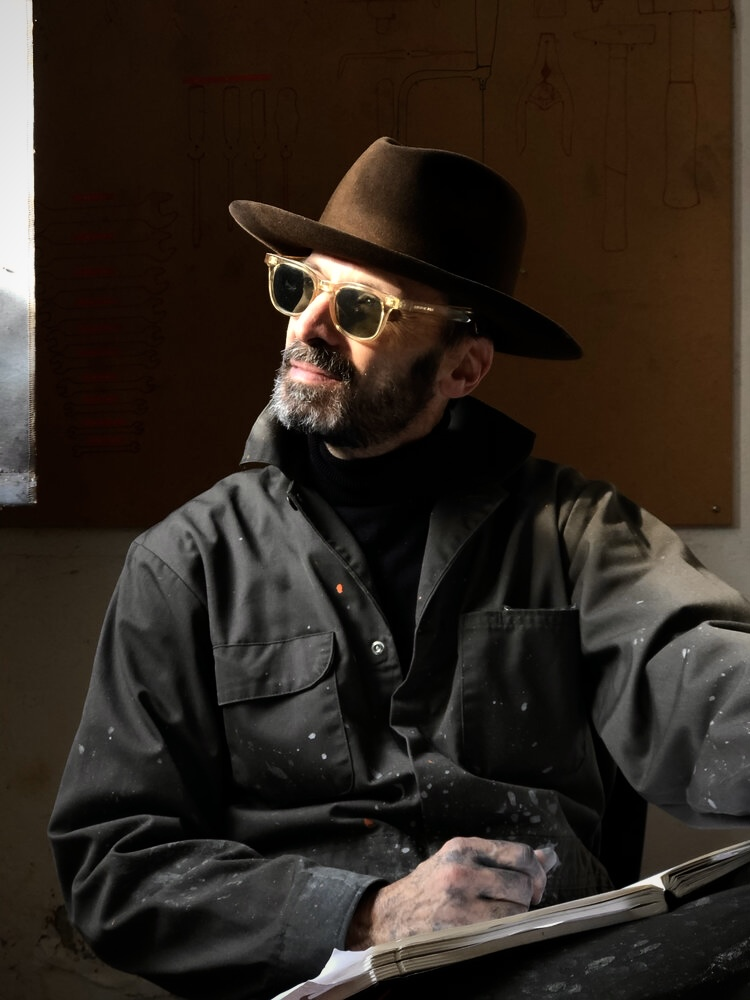
- Michael “Kaves” McLeer painting
- Born: Michael McLeer
- Known for: Rapper; Painter; Graffiti artist; actor; director; restaurator; tattooer
- Website: http://www.mrkaves.com/

Michael McLeer, better known as Kaves, is an American fine art painter, graffiti artist, illustrator, director, actor, author, rapper, and entrepreneur. From Brooklyn, New York, Kaves started doing graffiti in the 1980s. Part of the early 1980s train car movement, his talent got noticed, and he appeared in Henry Chalfant's book Spraycan Art (1987). Shortly after, with his brother, they created the hip-hop group Lordz of Brooklyn. They had four releases: All in the Family (1995), Graffiti Roc (2003), The Brooklyn Way (2006), and Family Reunion (2020).

Kaves is also a painter, graffiti muralist, tattoo artist, entrepreneur, and illustrator. He illustrated children's books Hip-Hop Alphabet (2017), The ABCs of Metallica (2019) and The ABCs of The Grateful Dead (2022). He is a co-author of Skin Graf: Masters of Graffiti Tattoo (2013). He has designed logos, illustrated, and made custom art for major companies (Jaguar, Aston Martin, Beaujolais nouveau, etc.), and musicians (Beastie Boys, Metallica, Everlast). His directorial debut, The Shoemaker (2010), won Best Short at The Art of Brooklyn Film Festival. He co-owns The Brooklyn Firefly, a restaurant, bar, and creative space in Bay Ridge, Brooklyn.

== Biography ==
=== 1980s to 1995: Rise to prominence ===
At the age of ten, fellow New Yorker, from Bay Ridge, Brooklyn, Michael McLeer said he started graffiti writing. He explained that at the time he was gravitating toward the arts because he was looking for something that would have his voice, however, there was no after-school program for the youth that took that direction, but there were plenty of graffiti writers that lived in his neighborhood, hence he joined them. He also explained that at that time the graffiti art form was going through a change as in the 1970s most of them were made by peaceful hippies, and that by the 1980s, the art form became competitive and gang-related where you had to hold your own. Within that world, his artist's name became "Kaves", and would spray graffiti on much of the public transport trains. Of the art form he said “with graffiti, most people can pass by and not even give a shit about it while other people are looking at the style, the letters—the technical stuff, y’know? The many layers of it. So, learning that over the years, you start to find your own style—your own voice".

Part of the early 1980s train car movement, his graffiti crew the Vice Boys were responsible for the Bay Ridge area graffiti style which was described in the book Mascots & Mugs as "flooded marker ink dripped from distinct curved slashing tags with a regional style." They painted much of the BMT Broadway Line.

During this time, he made a name for himself in the world of graffiti in New York City, by climbing down a fire exit to spray paint the subway line. By the age of fifteen, Kaves had become an esteemed graffiti artist.

In 1984, Kaves performed breakdancing in Chaka Khan's music video for the song "I Feel for You".

In 1987, Kaves's mural, named Miami Vice, was featured in Henry Chalfant's book Spraycan Art. Kaves explained that the book served as graffiti bible, and that from that point on he would get commissions to make art.

In this period, Kaves got caught by law enforcements making graffiti, this led Kaves to use his talents on the wall of a club named Ernie's Barry, where his brother Adam McLeer (ADMoney) worked as a Dj. They eventually convinced the owner to book the rap group Public Enemy. According to Adam, while meeting Chuck D, the lead rapper of the group, they told him they also rapped, to which he suggested that they make a demo.

The rap group Lordz of Brooklyn was initially formed in 1989, and joining the McLeer brothers was Scotty Westerman (Scotty Edge).

Their eventual demo had tracks produced by Public Enemy member Professor Griff and a guest appearance by House of Pain for the song "Baseball Bats and Beers."

In 1992, the group appeared and made the background graffiti in House of Pain's music video for the song "Shamrocks and Shenanigans (Boom Shalock Lock Boom)".

Also that year, Dino Cerillo (Bottz), and Paul Nugent (Paulie Two Times) joined.

On June 7, 1994, his mother and sister, Donna and Michele Blanchard aged 43 and 4 respectively, died from a hit-and-run in Brooklyn. It remains unsolved to this day. Kaves described his mother as a hippie who encouraged him and his brother to pursue their interest in hip hop.

During this time, on his own at the age of 24, Kaves had worked as a back vocalist for House of Pain, with whom he toured the US and Europe. Also, he opened a shop called BMT Lines where he sold merchandise that promoted Brooklyn artists.

In 1995, they released their debut All in the Family, signed to American Recordings/Ventrue. They group had to work hard to convince a label to welcome an Italian white group with gangland imagery. Kaves explained that the objective of the album is to take to on a train ride thought Brooklyn, and make an album that give his mother full credit on the support she gave him. Their first single "Saturday Night Fever" is a tribute to Kaves's favourite film by the same name. It became an underground success, especially among graffiti writers who identified with the content. It generally received favorable reviews. Paola Banchero of The Wichita Eagle, said there is "more musical twist than most hip-hop", described it as "gritty", and "good to listen while hanging out with the crew".

=== 1996 to 2006: Subsequent releases and start of tattooing career ===
In 1997, they provided some exclusive songs for soundtrack of the film Gravesend.

In 2000, with Bumpy Knuckles, they released the vinyl EP The Lordz of Brooklyn Meet Bumpy Knuckles.

2000 also saw the release of the Lordz of Brooklyn cover version of Run-DMC's hip hop classic "Sucker M.C.'s" on the tribute album Take A Bite Outta Rhyme: A Rock Tribute to Rap. Their version featured Stoned Soul and Everlast.

Kaves explained that during this time he began his tattooist career, while he was looking for something new to do and that fellow rapper Danny Boy gave him a tattoo machine. He also heard of graffiti writers who became tattooists, hence with fellow writer Med, they opened the tattoo parlour Tuff City Brooklyn Ink.

Also that year, Kaves was the cover illustrator of The Criterion Collection promotional DVD named Intergalactic DVD Single by the Beastie Boys.

In 2003 they released, Graffiti Roc. By this time the group consisted of the McLeer brothers as a duo. Their style leaned towards a crossover sound of both hip hop and rock influences. It featured Busta Rhymes, Korn, Rampage, Everlast, O.C., Freddie Foxxx, and Lord Finesse.

Live musicians were added, on guitar (Patrick Saccenti), bass and drums to tour festivals such as Vans Warped Tour in 2003, 2004 and 2005.

In 2006, the group shortened their name to "The Lordz" for the release of the third album The Brooklyn Way. Featured artists are Everlast, Bedouin Soundclash, and Tim Armstrong. Of this album Kaves said "the Lordz' music is positioned at the intersection of punk and hip-hop, and truly reflects its roots". Kaves said that the rebranding of the group's name was to avoid interference with their previous catalog. In 2018, they returned to their original name "Lordz Of Brooklyn".

=== 2008 to present day: Multidisciplinary artist and entrepreneur ===
In 2008, Kaves created the mural Death From Above. In 2021, it was destroyed by NYPD in a graffiti cleanup campaign in New York city, despite the fact that the art work was approved by the property owner. Kaves filed a lawsuit against the NYPD, which demands a stop to the cleanup campaign until they find out which artwork has been approved by a property owner.

In April 2008, The Lordz had their own reality TV show on Fuse entitled The Brooklyn Way. The show focused footage Kaves shot over the years focusing on their daily lives. Also that year it was announced they would do their fifth stint with the Vans Warped Tour.

In 2010, Kaves starred, wrote, and directed the short film The Shoemaker, based on the life of his uncle the 1960s. Acting with him were Burt Young, and Peter Greene. For his efforts, he won The Best Short at The Art of Brooklyn Film Festival, and was nominated for Best Short Narrative at the New Hampshire Film Festival.

Also that year, from April to September, some of Kaves's works were exhibited at The Blackstone Hotel's art floor.

In 2011, Kaves made a mural for the walls of the construction site of the Greenwood Beer Garden. The temporary mural had a The Honeymooners theme and was welcomed by the resident of the neighbourhood. Kaves said " It's the purest form of art,” and it still has an outlaw soul”. That same year, he designed the label of Georges Duboeuf's wine bottles of beaujolais nouveau.

Also that year, Kaves had his first solo art show at the Hionas Gallery, which was a success with the critics and the collectors. Justin Wolf, a representative of the gallery, said “his art is very mature, distinct, and confident, he is a master at his trade.”

In 2012, Jaguar's Director of Design Ian Callum hired Kaves to paint a series of cars for the company. Kaves said "I was enlisted to come up with something exciting and spontaneous. I went back to my roots and picked up the spray cans. Seeing the car itself and its great lines, it just inspired me." On painting the Jaguar XK, he said "it's the first car I've ever done legitimately" and that he "wanted to work with the lines of the car".

In 2013, at the Write Of Passage Opening Party, one of the installation was Kaves's tattoo parlour. That same year, he co-authored with Billy Burke the book Skin Graf: Masters of Graffiti Tattoo, which is about the artistry of both graffiti and tattooing, and the aesthetics that links them together. The book also covers several graffiti artist who became tattooers. During this time he owned a tattoo parlor named Brooklyn Made Tattoo.

In 2014, Kaves played the lead in Don Capria's short film Eulogy, acting alongside Federico Castelluccio. With the rest of the cast, they won Best Ensemble at the Queens World Film Festival. That year he also painted a mural dedicated to his mother and his sister, on the hit-and-run location.

In 2015, Kaves painted the mural Brooklyn Made. Also, that year Aston Martin's hired Kaves to do a unique paint job on their new Aston Martin Vanquish the "Vanquish Volante". According to Kaves, Marek Reichman their design director “wanted to have an art car, something tattoo-inspired, so he came to me." The car was meant to be auctioned at "The Art Basel" but sold prior to the event.

In 2016, Kaves opened the restaurant "The Brooklyn Firefly" which specializes in pizza, beer, music and art. Kaves said "We wanted to do something that felt homemade, and Bay Ridge is known for having some great pizza, so we wanted to throw our hat into that. We're not reinventing the wheel but we're definitely putting our own neighborhood shine on it.”

In 2017, Kaves illustrated the children book Hip-Hop Alphabet.

In 2019, in the artisan-retail space "That Maker Guild", Kaves opened "Mr. Kaves Pigtown Tattoo", which is both a tattoo and graffiti shop. As well as getting a tattoo the visitors can observe the procedure, and buy custom made graffiti. Also that year Kaves illustrated, Metallica's children book The ABCs of Metallica.

In 2020, with Lordz of Brooklyn, they released a new album Family Reunion, with the participation of Westerman and Nugent.

Also that year, from February 8 to March 8, Kaves's art show "Concrete Cathedrals" was exhibited at Brooklyn Industry City. On the website Staten Islander describes his canvases to be "featured hand-styled typography, overlapping in many layers forming complex textures, juxtaposed against backgrounds of black, grey, and sepia, with street scenes of Kaves’ home-town, Brooklyn. Media included China markers, acrylic, oil, and spray paint. Canvas sizes ranged in proportions, with dimensions of 48″ x 36″, 59 x 102″, 65″ x 141″, to cite only a few. All were different."

In 2021, at Sean Penn's CORE benefit, during the event Kaves painted a large canvas to be auctioned. Furthermore, he acted in the filmThe Many Saints of Newark. Also in 2021, he received 4th place of Loud News Net top graffiti artists of the 1980s.

In 2022, Kaves acted in vignettes for the documentary series Everything's Gonna Be All White. Also that year Kaves illustrated, Grateful Dead's children book The ABCs of The Grateful Dead.

In 2023, Kaves was a guest at the Porsche Festival in Japan. Also that year at Sotheby's third hip hop auction for hip-hop's 50th anniversary, Kaves's piece book page from 1985 named Rock the Bell, which he made in honor of LL Cool J's single by the same name, was auctioned.

In 2024, with collaborators and assisting artists, Kaves completed and led the mural project Welcome to Bay Ridge on 86th Street. Neighborhood figures and cultural nods included in the mural are Albert King, Chef Rawia of Tanoreen, Chuck Connors, Saturday Night Fever's John Travolta and Karen Lynn Gorney, Brooklyn Dodgers' Pee Wee Reese, and the Lordz of Brooklyn. Of the project, Kaves said, “my work is all about the landscape of Brooklyn and the struggle. In that struggle, we made something beautiful and that's how I look at the mural. It's a celebration of Bay Ridge — past, present and future.”

On September 28 of that year, “Brooklyn Pop,” an immersive exhibit at Industry City in Sunset Park, opened to celebrate Brooklyn's global influence on culture through art, music, and film. Created by Kaves the 11,000-square-foot exhibit features installations like a subway car honoring The Warriors and the disco dancefloor from Saturday Night Fever. Inspired by Kaves's travels and Brooklyn's underdog spirit, the exhibit blends his family's story with the borough's creative legacy. Visitors can explore Brooklyn's cultural history and catch performances of Kaves's play A Brooklyn Dream.

Within his career, Kaves did graphics, illustrations, and logos for Nike, Rockstar Games, WWE, Pony, the musician Everlast, Mtv, Adidas, and Vans Warped Tour. Galleries where his work was exhibited are the MTV Real World: Brooklyn loft, Gunter Sachs Museum of Fine Arts in Germany, The Hard Rock Hotel in San Diego, and the Rock and Roll Hall of Fame in Cleveland.

== Artistry ==
The book Mascots & Mugs, describes Kaves style in the 1980s as "the anomaly of an unexpected burner by a usually inside-tagging-only-pal, suspiciously running in pastel colors, hinted at Kaves's involvement in a production." The book also mentions him being influenced by anime.

Kaves's art is meant to encapsulate the energy of Brooklyn. About his artistry he said "I felt like that's who we really were. It was like, if you had nothing, your environment will show you what you do have. And Brooklyn was like a religion, or a nationality to us. Something more than anything else. Then you have Kaves from Brooklyn, Lordz of Brooklyn, that in itself has so much texture to it, that even as an adult, I'm still unearthing all of the textures to my life and my surroundings, and still expressing them through my paintings, sculptures, films, even acting."

In his visual work, Kaves will follow the evolution of Brooklyn and see everything as art. For example, Kaves observed that during the pandemic people would buff graffiti of their buildings with paint that don't match the color of the wall. Visualizing this as a form of art, he incorporated the buffing in his art.

On painting cars, he explained that the process is improvisational "because looks are deceiving, that car has not a flat surface on it, it's very curvy, it's an incredible work of art. They approached me because they liked the fact that I'm a multi-ranged artist and they were looking for something tattoo inspired. So they wanted to treat the car as if it was someone getting tattooed. Like someone that walks into my shop, you never know the surface because everyone's body is different, so you have to wrestle with the skin texture, same with the car. You can't approach it, put a paint brush to it and get a straight line, so I had to go back to the days of my youth painting trains and take out the spray cans and go at it with that kind of excitement and improv."

As a tattooist, Kaves thinks there is a parallel between graffiti and making tattoos. He said that "instead of the train, displaying your artwork on people's bodies and that really appealed to me and I picked up a tattoo machine and made a career out of tattooing the last 16 years. I felt it was just another form of graffiti. You can call it street art, you can call it graffiti art, but it's really raw folk art. I like to believe that it's folk art and I'm a folklorist." On his influences, he said that at a young age, his father had a tattoo made by Tony Polito that caught his attention. When working on the craft he was influenced and received guidance by Mark Mahoney, Freddy Negrete, Mister Cartoon, and Estevan Oriol.

He also added that in "his opinion, skin is the hardest canvas to work on. It's a living breathing thing and you never know who is going to sit in the chair and where they are going to tell you they want you to tattoo them. Down the neck, the armpit, you never know what to expect. The palm of the hand, the inside of a lip, or whatever - it is always changing. At least with the walls and trains, you always knew what to expect. Tattooing is very physical graffiti because you're stretching and pulling and working the skin. It definitely can be challenging, and it is a unique experience every single time."

== Personal ==
Kaves met his wife Donna when he was fifteen years old. They have been together ever since and have three sons and one daughter.

== Discography ==
- 1995 - All in the Family - with Lordz of Brooklyn
- 2003 - Graffiti Roc - with Lordz of Brooklyn
- 2006 - The Brooklyn Way - with The Lordz
- 2020 - Family Reunion - with Lordz of Brooklyn

== Partial list of artwork ==
=== Painting ===
- Ride the Lightning (undated)

=== Murals ===
- Miami Vice (documented in 1987)
- Death From Above (2010)
- The Honeymooners themed mural for the construction site's walls of the Greenwood Beer Garden (2011)
- Mural dedicated to mother and sister (2014)
- Brooklyn Made (2015)
- Welcome to Bay Ridge (2024)

== Bibliography ==
=== Author ===
- 2013 - Skin Graf: Masters of Graffiti Tattoo - with Billy Burke

=== Illustrator ===
- 2017 - Hip-Hop Alphabet
- 2019 - The ABCs of Metallica
- 2022 - The ABCs of The Grateful Dead

== Accolades ==
- 2015 - Best Ensemble - shared with the rest of the cast of Eulogy - Queens World Film Festival
- 2021 - 4th Place - Best Graffiti Artists of the 1980s - Loud News Net

== Partial filmography ==
=== Director ===
- 2010 - The Shoemaker - short film - also writer and actor

=== Actor ===
- 1984 - I feel for you - music video by Chaka Khan
- 1992 - Shamrocks and Shenanigans (Boom Shalock Lock Boom) - music video by House of Pain
- 2014 - Eulogy - short film
- 2021 - The Many Saints of Newark - film
- 2022 - Everything's Gonna Be All White - documentary series

== Works cited ==
- Chalfant, Henry (1987). Spraycan Art. London: Thames and Hudson Inc. ISBN 0-500-27469-X
- Villorente, David; James, Todd (2007). Mascots & Mugs. New-York: Testify Books. ISBN 9780972592048
- McLeer, Michael "Kaves"; Burke, Billy (2013). Skin Graf: Masters of Graffiti Tattoo. Prestel. ISBN 978-3-7913-4663-2.
