= Salvatore Stabile =

American writer and director

Salvatore "Sal" Stabile is an American television and feature film writer, director and producer. Born in Brooklyn, New York in 1974, he directed his first feature film, Gravesend (1997), when he was 19 years old. Stabile has gone on to write for numerous television shows, including The Sopranos (2001) and Rescue Me (2004).

== Early life ==
Salvatore Stabile was born and raised in a section of Brooklyn known as Gravesend, close to Coney Island. He graduated from Xaverian High School in Bay Ridge, then attended New York University Tisch School of the Arts.

Stabile began writing while he was in high school. He wrote an unpublished memoir about his life growing up in Brooklyn, then later adapted a portion of the book into his first feature film, called Gravesend. Stabile wrote, directed and produced Gravesend when he was 19 years old. The film premiered at the Hamptons Film Festival, then went on to compete in the Seattle Film Festival and the Torino Film Festival, where it was nominated for Best Film in the International Feature Film Competition. The gritty independent film, made for under $10,000, quickly caught the eye of Hollywood. After screening Gravesend, Oliver Stone attached himself an executive producer to help Stabile secure distribution for the independent film. Shortly after, Palm Pictures purchased Gravesend and released the movie in the Fall of 1997. During that time, Steven Spielberg awarded Stabile with a two picture feature deal at DreamWorks.

== Career ==
In 2001, Stabile wrote for The Sopranos (HBO). He wrote episode 6 of season 3, called "University". In 2002, Stabile was a story editor and wrote for Fastlane, a series for Fox, produced by McG, starring Bill Bellamy and Peter Facinelli. In 2004, he went to write and co-produce Rescue Me (FX), starring Denis Leary. In 2005, Stabile wrote for the FX television show called Over There. In 2007, he was a writer and executive producer of Fox series Drive. In the same year, Stabile wrote, directed and produced his second film called Where God Left His Shoes starring John Leguizamo, Leonor Varela, Jerry Ferrara and David Castro. Paul Allen and his Vulcan Films production company financed the movie. Where God Left His Shoes was later purchased and released by IFC Films. Where God Left His Shoes was nominated for several Imagen Awards, and it went on to win the Humanitas Prize in the Sundance Feature Film category in 2007.

In 2010, Stabile was a writer and supervising producer on the television show called My Generation for ABC. In 2011, he was also a writer and supervising producer on Revenge for ABC. In 2014, Stabile worked as a writer and co-executive producer for the Starz series called Power. In 2015, he wrote one episode and served as consulting producer for the MTV series Finding Carter. In 2018 and 2019, he served as writer and executive producer for the shows Waco (Paramount Network) and Reprisal (Hulu) respectively. In 2025, he wrote one episode and served as consulting producer for the MGM+ series Godfather of Harlem.
