= New York International Latino Film Festival =

The New York Latino International Film Festival or NY Latino International Film Festival is a major Hispanic film festival located in New York City. The festival features over sixty films, shorts, and documentaries over the course of six days, along with other events focused on Latino culture.

== List of award winners by year ==
=== 2008 ===
- Best Picture - Vicious Circle - Director: Paul Boyd
- Best Documentary Award - Transvestites Also Cry - Director: Sebastiano D'Ayala Valva
- Best Documentary Award - La Americana -Directors: Nicholas Bruckman & John Mattiuzzi
- Best Short Award - Rojo Red - Director: Juan Manuel Betancourt
- Heineken Red Star Award - Malta Con Huevo - Director: Cristobal Valderrama

=== 2009 ===
- Best Film - Inside a Change - Director: Rik Cordero
- Best Short Film - Lalo - Director: Daniel Maldonado
- Audience Choice Award: Best Picture - El Regalo de la Pachamama - Director: Toshifumi Matsushita
- Best Documentary - Stages - Directors: Meerkat Media Collective

=== 2010 ===
- Best Domestic Feature - Forged - Director: William Wedig
- Best Short Film - Career Day - Director: Ivette Garcia Davila
- Best International Feature - Habana Eva - Director: Fina Torres
- Best Director - 25 KILATES (25 CARAT) - Director: Patxi Amezcua
- Best Documentary - So Far - Director: Stephanie LaMorre

=== 2011 ===
- Best Short Film- La Ducha (The Shower) - Director: Jose Maria San Martin
- Best U.S. Feature Film - Maria My Love - Director/Writer: Jasmine McGlade Chazelle
- Best International Feature Film - El Regreso (The Return) - Director/Writer: Hernán Jiménez
- Best Director - Blacktino - Director/Writer: Aaron Burns
- Best Documentary - El Edificio de los Chilenos (The Chilean Building) - Director/: Macarena Aguilo Marchi & Susana Foxley
