= Manny Pérez =

Dominican American actor (born 1969)

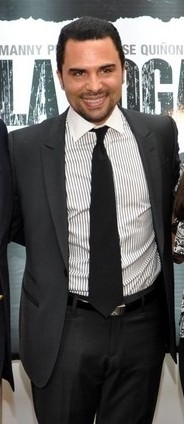
- Pérez in 2010
- Born: Manuel Pérez Batista; May 5, 1969 (age 57); Baitoa, Santiago Province, Dominican Republic
- Years active: 1993–present

Manuel Pérez "Manny" Batista (born May 5, 1969) is a Dominican American actor who has appeared in the television series Third Watch and in the film Washington Heights. He is the cousin of Pulitzer Prize-winning author Junot Díaz.

== Life and career ==
Pérez was born in Baitoa, Santiago, Dominican Republic and currently lives in Washington Heights, Manhattan.

Pérez is one of 11 siblings. By the time Pérez finished high school he knew that he wanted to be an actor so he moved to New York City where he majored in drama at Marymount Manhattan College, graduating in 1992.

He studied at Ensemble Studio Theatre and is a member of the LAByrinth Theatre Company, in New York City.

Following his performance on the film Washington Heights (which he also co-wrote and produced), Pérez garnered praise from many critics.

The New York Times stated, "Mr. Perez has charisma to burn." He won the 2002 Best Actor Award at The Milan International Film Festival in Italy for his performance in Washington Heights.

At the Santo Domingo Invita show, he was honored as one of the most prominent Dominican actors in the United States.

In November 2007, Pérez was honored in the Dominican Film Festival held in Puerto Plata along with Dania Ramirez for his humanitarian work in the Dominican Republic. When Pérez received the award, he said that his first pair of shoes were given to him at the age of five by his father and that he only wore them to go to Mass on Sundays. Pérez also said that when he first came to the United States, he gained a great deal of weight from what was later discovered to be hookworms in his stomach, which had first infected his feet after he walked the streets barefoot. Pérez donated 10,000 shoes to families who lost everything after Hurricane Noel swept across the Dominican Republic.

In 2012 he was elected by Luz García's Noche de Luz programme as a "Summer's Hot Body".

== Filmography ==
Source: (Note: Films and television series that Pérez has appeared in include:)

Key
†	Denotes films that have not yet been released

=== Film ===
Film work by Manny Pérez
Year	Title	Role	Notes
1993	New York Cop	Tito	
1994	Crooklyn	Hector	
1996	Courage Under Fire	Jenkins	
1996	Bullet	Flaco	
1996	Sleeping Together	Carlos	
1997	Stick Up	Eddie	Short film
1998	Neto's Run	Neto	Short film
1999	On the Q.T.	Aurelio	
2000	Brother	Mexican Mafia Hitman	
2000	Dinner Rush	Gabriel	
2002	Washington Heights	Carlos	Story writer
2002	King Rikki	Jorge Ortega	
2003	Party Monster	Johnny	
2004	The Breakup Artist	Carlos	
2006	Yellow	Angelo	
2006	El Cantante	Eddie	
2007	The Ministers	Detective Manso	
2007	Rockaway	Antwan	
2007	Illegal Tender	Wilson DeLeon Sr.	
2007	Tracks of Color	George Martinez	
2007	Amexicano	Diego	
2007	Where God Left His Shoes	Luis	
2008	Nothing like the Holidays	Alexis	
2008	Last Call	Javier	
2008	Pride and Glory	Coco Dominguez	
2009	La soga	Luisito	Story writer
2009	A Kiss of Chaos	Tony	
2010	Forged	Chuco	Also writer
2012	El Rey de Najayo	Julián López	
2013	Crosstown	Jesus	
2017	Colao	Antonio	
2018	Veneno	Jack Veneno	
2021	Night of the Sicario	Leon Ramirez	
2024	Tiguere	Alberto	
TBA	Hopeless_Dr †	Sam	Post-production

=== Television ===
Television work by Manny Pérez
Year	Title	Role	Notes
1994-1996	New York Undercover	Tony	2 episodes
1995	NYPD Blue	Tonio	Episode: "Cold Heaters"
1998	Brooklyn South	Estefan	Episode: "Violet Inviolate"
1999	Rude Awakening	Jesus	2 episodes
2001-2002	100 Centre Street	Ramon Rodriguez	18 episodes
2002	Law & Order: Criminal Intent	Jorge Galvez	Episode: "The Pilgrim"
2002-2021	Law & Order: Special Victims Unit	Sergeant Hagen / Angel Perez / DEA Agent / CSU Technician	4 episodes
2004	Dragnet	Sergio	Episode: "Riddance"
2004	CSI: Miami	Manny Orantes	Episode: "Crime Wave"
2005	Night Stalker	Tattoo Man / Caleca	Episode: "The Source"
2005	Third Watch	Manny Santiago	10 episodes
2006-2007	Rescue Me	Detective Luis	5 episodes
2008	Canterbury's Law	Hector Monteiros	Episode: "Sick as Your Secrets"
2010	Criminal Minds	Manny	Episode: "Corazon"
2010	Cold Case	Tut' 10	Episode: "Bombers"
2013	Homeland	El Niño	2 episodes
2016	The Blacklist	Johan Halbeck	Episode: "Miles McGrath (No. 65)"
2016	Luke Cage	Lieutenant Pérez	3 episodes
2019	Bull	Trent Bolton	Episode: "Bounty"
2020	Big Dogs	Santiago	8 episodes

=== Video games ===
Year	Title	Role	Notes
2026	Grand Theft Auto VI	Raul Bautista	Voice and motion capture

== See also ==
- List of people from the Dominican Republic
