= Little Fugitive =

Little Fugitive may refer to:

- Little Fugitive (1953 film), American feature with non-professional actors
- Little Fugitive (2006 film), American remake of 1953 film
