= Adrift in Manhattan =

- Directed by: Alfredo De Villa
- Written by: Nat Moss; Alfredo De Villa
- Produced by: Steven J. Brown; Joshua Blum
- Starring: Heather Graham; Victor Rasuk; Dominic Chianese; Elizabeth Peña; William Baldwin
- Music by: Michael A. Levine
- Production company: Washington Square Films
- Distributed by: Screen Media Films
- Release date: January 10, 2007 (Sundance Film Festival)
- Running time: 91 minutes
- Country: United States
- Languages: English; Spanish

Adrift in Manhattan is a 2007 American drama film directed by Alfredo De Villa and written by Nat Moss based on a story by De Villa. The film centers on New Yorkers who are lonely and emotionally lost in the big city. Adrift in Manhattan features an ensemble cast, including Heather Graham, Victor Rasuk, Dominic Chianese, Elizabeth Peña, and William Baldwin.

The film earned mixed reviews upon release. It was nominated for Best Narrative Feature at the 2007 Sundance Film Festival Feature Competition. It was awarded the Grand Jury Prize for Best Narrative Feature at the 2007 Indianapolis International Film Festival, the Best Director Prize at the 2007 San Diego Film Festival, and the Special Jury Ensemble Award for best cast at the 2007 Palm Beach International Film Festival.

== Plot ==
Rose, an ophthalmologist, has separated from her husband, a school teacher, and is in deep mourning over the recent death of their two-year-old son, who accidentally fell out a window. Tomaso is a painter who has just learned that he's going blind. Simon is a 20-year-old photo shop clerk living at home with his alcoholic mother.

The three strangers live along the 1/9 subway line and two of them connect in a profound way. Simon, using borrowed cameras, becomes obsessed with Rose's scarf and begins stalking her to take her picture. When she learns what he is doing, her reaction is unexpected.

== Cast ==
- Heather Graham as Rose Phipps
- Victor Rasuk as Simon Colon
- Dominic Chianese as Tommaso Pensara
- William Baldwin as Mark Phipps
- Elizabeth Peña as Isabel Parades
- Erika Michels as Claire Phipps
- Marlene Forte as Marta Colon
- Richard Petrocelli as Mr. Sneider

== Production ==
Alfredo De Villa came up with the concept of Adrift in Manhattan while flying to a festival in Havana, Cuba, to present his 2002 film Washington Heights:

While I was naturally thrilled and excited, I was also exhausted. I realized--at least, based on my personal experience--that while we have all of these technological advances that takes us from the most recondite to the most elegant cities in the world, we're essentially left emotionally (not to say spiritually) at bay. We don't necessarily change or become enlightened with every journey we undertake. I was born in Puebla, Mexico, and here I was heading to Havana, Cuba, a place that existed only in my imagination; I never thought I'd be doing so much traveling. The sense of immediate direction strikingly contrasted with the emotional isolation.

I thought of exploring this basic idea within three characters. Why three? I'm not sure. That number has always contained something balanced and just right. So I settled on the number while I was sitting in the plane (by that time, we had already landed and we were waiting to taxi--it took over 2 hours). The other idea that came to me was exploring this sense of tiredness, of solitude (common in most travelers) in the three characters. I quickly made the decision that to explore loneliness, you explore the need for love. I'm attracted to internal characters and ideas. But it's hard to explore internal characters and ideas in film, so I turned it into its positive, which, in turn, can be turned into action. I decided to explore love instead.

De Villa said that he initially wanted the film to have a "slow, small movement." "The story was always going to be as big as the characters. Never bigger than them. It was a challenge to ourselves to see if we could pull it off." The screenplay for Adrift in Manhattan was written by Nat Moss, who previously worked with De Villa on Washington Heights. According to De Villa:

I talked to Nat about writing a movie about the smaller movements in life. Without sounding pretentious, we wanted to make a tone piece where the challenge was to take plot and put it in the backseat, and make a movie about believable characters and their needs, and make those needs the top priority. Then all of the story, all the drama, all the movement would come out of that. What they need is who they are.

It took Moss two and a half years and numerous drafts to complete the script. The final screenplay was sent to Scott Foster, who would become the co-producer, and sent to UTA and Steve Brown, who would handle financing and became the main producer.

Financing Adrift in Manhattan lasted for two years: "In that period, we went through a bunch—and I mean a bunch—of producers, all of whom tried their best to get it done. My agent also helped a lot. The first thing we did is we got a cast interested and attached. From there, like I said above, my producer Steve Brown got involved and magically raised the money. I say 'magically' because I honestly still don't know how he did it. He just did and we were shooting." De Villa said the script was much darker in earlier drafts, but that it was toned down due to financial reasons: "The scenes between the mother and son were a lot more explicit, and we had to stay more at the level of hint and suggestion. What Heather's and Victor's characters did was a lot darker, as well—more than just the spanking, if you will!" He also said that casting took place during the writing process: "I always get inspired by actors and find myself writing for them. I don't necessarily mean writing for big-name actors or stars, but writing for actors I have worked in the past with or that I have seen in films and plays. That happened to me with the role of Victor Rasuk (who I loved in Raising Victor Vargas), Marlene Forte (a great actress, who I had the pleasure of working with on the stage), Richard Petrocelli (I had worked with him in my student short) and Elizabeth Peña (no words of introduction are necessary). For the rest of the roles, I was extremely open. My agent set me up with several meetings with very good actresses for the role that Heather Graham eventually did. One of them was Heather. I immediately liked her energy and had this hunch about it."

In Adrift in Manhattan, Graham's character Rose becomes paralyzed when she hears the death of her two-year-old son. In preparing for her role, Graham not only imagined what it would be like for the character to experience the death of her toddler but was also actually depressed due to circumstances in her own personal life. Rasuk said that when he first looked at the screenplay for his character, Simon, he wanted to make sure that "every scene and every moment was really real." He also claimed he was affected by a man older than he who had experienced depression in his life, which helped him prepare for his role.

Simon's incestuous relationship with his mother in Adrift in Manhattan was based on De Villa's complicated family history. He stated, "The first thing I should say is that my mother and I never had any incestuous relationship! Let’s get rid of that evil rumor before it arises! Actually I’m not that close to my mother: my father is dead, and I essentially grew up without a father. . . . It was a very conscious decision when we were thinking about that character to make him have this really complex relationship with his mother."

De Villa claimed the film's title was originally going to be1/9, named after the subway lines. The writers were going to set a scene where Rose pursues one of her stalkers in a subway. However, the title was changed for two reasons: when being accepted into the Sundance Film Festival, De Villa was asked to pick a more mainstream title; and they decided to change the setting and context of that scene based on a "cat and mouse" scene from the 1971 drama thriller The French Connection.

Production began in February 2006, and the footage was edited by July. De Villa said the quick filming schedules were the biggest challenge of making the film.

== Critical reception ==
Reviews of Adrift in Manhattan from critics were mixed, holding an aggregate of 44% on Rotten Tomatoes as of August 2014. Julia Wallace, critic for The Village Voice, wrote "that you can't build a movie around lingering, soulful shots of the No. 1 train zooming up and down the West Side." Variety writer Dennis Harvey said, "Mild thesp marquee value and the glut of similar, often bolder exercises in recent memory make this a so-so theatrical prospect, though it should do OK in cable and DVD arenas." Like Lumenick, he also praised the acting but wrote that the film didn't "go anywhere definite or distinctive enough to leave a lasting impression." In an article for The New York Times, Jeannette Catsoulis called it "an all-too-familiar wallow in urban woe and artfully photographed isolation" and concluded, "If there are eight million stories in the Naked City, some of them must be better than this." Scott Weinberg of Moviefone wrote, "While not exactly what you'd call a bad movie, Adrift in Manhattan is simply too predictable, familiar and obvious to warrant much in the way of attention or enthusiasm." An Indiewire writer named it "a pile of loose threads and anyone desiring dramatic finality will leave disappointed."

On the more positive side, /Film's Peter Sciretta said it was a "pleasant surprise" that "provides an interesting and intimate snapshot of the life of everyday people in New York City," awarding it a seven out of ten. Emanuel Levy opined, "De Villa's meditation on loss, loneliness, and alienation in urban New York is downbeat, slow, studied, and a bit pretentious, but it's nicely acted by the entire cast, particularly Victor Rasuk and Dominic Chianese." He also noted the film score as his favorite aspect of the movie, which, he said, "accentuates the melancholy and sorrowful mood of the film." Kirk Honeycutt, writing for The Hollywood Reporter, said the film was "like a good short story, where there are no wasted moments and an economy of expression allows the story to achieve maximum impact." Jamie Tipps, in his three-and-a-half-star review for Film Threat, said he liked "that it is not the coldness of the city that causes these characters to be alone; all around, people reach out to them." Jack Matthews of the New York Daily News gave it three out of five stars and named it "a small film with great humanity and deserves a broader audience than it's likely to get." In a DVD review for Home Media Magazine, Pete Croatto was positive about the directing: "[De Villa] lets the action unfold at a leisurely and thoughtful pace, letting viewers put the pieces together themselves. In that regard, his latest effort is reminiscent of such classic indie films as Metropolitan and Stranger Than Paradise." Houston Press critic Nick Keppler wrote, "Fans of Paul Thomas Anderson or Atom Egoyan may want to take note of Alfredo De Villa," calling him "the next great American drama master."

== Awards ==
Won

- Sundance Film Festival Narrative Feature Competition
- Indianapolis International Film Festival
- Palm Beach International Film Festival
- San Diego Film Festival
