= Gravesend (disambiguation) =

Gravesend is a town in Kent, England.

Gravesend may also refer to:

== Places ==
- Gravesend, New South Wales, Australia
- Gravesend, Hertfordshire, England, a hamlet
- Gravesend, Brooklyn, a neighbourhood of New York City, United States (home to Gravesend Race Track)
- Gravesend (UK Parliament constituency), former parliamentary constituency named after the town in Kent

== Other uses ==
- Gravesend (film), a 1997 criminal drama film
- "Gravesend", a song by Stone Sour from House of Gold & Bones – Part 2
