= Forged (film) =

- Directed by
- Written by: William Wedig; Manny Pérez
- Produced by: Joshua Crook; Steven
- Starring: Manny Perez; David Castro; Margo Martindale; Jaime Tirelli; Kevin Breznahan
- Cinematography: Zeus Morand
- Edited by: William Wedig
- Music by: Evan Wilson, Alex Alexander (percussion)
- Distributed by: Maya Entertainment
- Release dates: July 31, 2010 (New York); July 29, 2011 (United States)
- Country: United States
- Language: English

Forged is a 2010 drama film directed by William Wedig starring Manny Pérez, David Castro, Margo Martindale, Kevin Breznahan, and Jaime Tirelli. Forged was released in theaters through Maya Entertainment on July 29, 2011, as part of the Maya Indie Series.

== Plot ==
Set in the cold and industrial town of Scranton, Pennsylvania, Forged follows Chuco (Manny Pérez) on his quest to redeem himself after committing a sin against his son, Machito (David Castro). After Chuco’s release from prison, the boy, now 13 years old, abused and homeless, seeks him out and mutters: “You killed my mother. Now I kill you.” As Chuco’s guilt and Machito’s need for a father take hold, they must find a way to move past the circumstances to forge a bond that has been once broken.

== Cast ==
- Manny Perez as Chuco
- David Castro as Machito
  - Matthew Rios as Young Machito
- Margo Martindale as Dianne
- Jamie Tirelli as Cesar
- Kevin Breznahan as "Moose"
- John Bianco as Frederico
- Steve Cirbus as Stanley
- Lanny Flaherty as Tom
- Robert Haley as Wallace
- Laura Heisler as Ashley
- Clark Jackson as Bo
- Tony Ray Rossi as Anthony
- Christopher Halladay as Foster Father
- Jen Smith as Hot Girl

== Awards and screenings ==
- Best Domestic Feature, Presented by HBO at the 2010 New York International Latino Film Festival
- Outstanding Film Award at the 2010 Providence Latin American American Film Festival
- Official Selection at the 2010 Los Angeles Latino Film Festival
- Official Selection at the 2011 San Diego Latino Film Festival
