= Washington Heights (film) =

2002 film by Alfredo De Villa

- Directed by: Alfredo De Villa
- Written by: Nat Moss; Alfredo De Villa; Junot Díaz (additional dialogue); Manny Pérez (story)
- Starring: Tomas Milian; Manny Pérez; Danny Hoch
- Cinematography: Claudio Chea
- Edited by: Tom Donahue
- Music by: Leigh Roberts
- Production companies: Ex-Bo Productions; Stolen Car Productions; AsDuesDon
- Distributed by: Mac Releasing
- Release date: May 9, 2002 (Tribeca Film Festival)
- Running time: 89 minutes
- Country: United States
- Languages: English; Spanish

Washington Heights is a 2002 American independent drama film directed by Alfredo De Villa. It stars Vanessa Ferlito, Carlos León, and Steven Pasquale in lead roles, alongside a cast of other talented actors. The film's story focuses on the lives of several residents in Washington Heights as they navigate the challenges of love, ambition, and cultural heritage.

== Plot summary ==
The film revolves around the lives of several characters living in the Washington Heights neighborhood of Manhattan. The protagonist, Nina (Vanessa Ferlito), is a young woman who dreams of leaving her close-knit family and the limitations of her community to pursue a career in dance. Her life becomes more complicated when she is confronted with the pressures of her family, particularly her protective mother, and her romantic feelings for a local mechanic, Hector (Carlos León).

As Nina struggles to balance her aspirations and her responsibilities, Hector, who is dealing with his own personal demons, also faces choices that will impact his future. The film touches upon the immigrant experience and the complex relationships between family, culture, and self-identity.

== Cast ==
- Vanessa Ferlito as Nina
- Carlos León as Hector
- Steven Pasquale as the character of Jake
- Radha Mitchell as Sofia
- Miriam Colon as the matriarch of the family, Nina's mother

== Reviews ==
Upon release, Washington Heights received mixed to positive reviews from critics. While some praised the film for its realistic depiction of life in a vibrant immigrant neighborhood, others critiqued its predictability and pacing. The film was noted for its strong performances, particularly by Vanessa Ferlito, who was lauded for her portrayal of Nina, a character caught between tradition and her desire for independence.

The film was also appreciated for its soundtrack, which featured a blend of Latin and contemporary music, contributing to the film's emotional depth and cultural authenticity.
