= Ruta madre =

2017 Mexican-American comedy-drama film

- Theatrical release poster
- Directed by: Agustin Castañeda
- Written by: Agustin Castañeda; Joey Molina
- Produced by: Jeronimo Bertran; Jared Safier
- Starring: David Castro; William Miller; Lia Marie Johnson; Carmen Salinas; Angélica María; Paulina Gaitan; Paul Rodriguez
- Cinematography: Mario Ortiz
- Music by: Ali Helnwein; Daniel McCormick
- Production companies: Alpha Centauri Pictures; Safier Entertainment
- Distributed by: Comedy Dynamics
- Release date: March 16, 2017 (San Diego Latino Film Festival)
- Running time: 92 minutes
- Countries: United States; Mexico
- Languages: English; Spanish

Ruta Madre is a 2017 Mexican-American road comedy-drama film directed by Agustin Castañeda and starring David Castro, William Miller, Lia Marie Johnson, Carmen Salinas, Angélica María, Paulina Gaitan and Paul Rodriguez.

== Plot ==
Ruta Madre is the story of a rite of passage where American culture and Rock and Roll meet the music, traditions, and beauty of Mexico. Based on a true story, the film chronicles the story of Daniel, a talented young Mexican-American singer and his cynical uncle Rodrigo. When his first love Daisy breaks his heart, in emotional agony Daniel reluctantly leaves his home in San Diego, California and embarks on a road trip with his uncle, who is also on the run from a past that haunts him.

The journey begins at the US/Mexico border, and winds its way through Tijuana, Ensenada, down the majestic Baja peninsula, through the French mining town of Santa Rosalia, and finally arriving at a family ranch in Ciudad Constitution. People of varied characters are just some of the characters Daniel and Rodrigo meet along the way.

== Cast ==
- Paulina Gaitán as Colette
- Lia Marie Johnson as Daisy
- David Castro as Daniel
- Héctor Jiménez as Officer Benitez
- Paul Rodriguez as Flaco
- William Miller as Rodrigo
- Sandra Luesse as Cherrie
- Angélica María as Agata
- Carmen Salinas as Doña Ceci
- Luis Felipe Tovar as Comandante
- Reinaldo Zavarce as Jose Ibarra
