= Where God Left His Shoes =

- Directed by: Salvatore Stabile
- Written by: Salvatore Stabile
- Produced by: Daniel Edelman; Salvatore Stabile; Richard Hutton; Michael Caldwell
- Starring: John Leguizamo; Leonor Varela; David Castro; Samantha M. Rose; Jerry Ferrara; Manny Pérez
- Cinematography: Vanja Cernjul
- Edited by: Chris Monte
- Music by: Jeff Beal
- Production company: Vulcan Productions
- Distributed by: IFC Films
- Release dates: April 27, 2007 (Tribeca); December 12, 2008 (United States)
- Running time: 96 minutes
- Country: United States
- Language: English

Where God Left His Shoes is a 2007 American drama film written and directed by Salvatore Stabile and starring John Leguizamo, Leonor Varela, David Castro, Samantha M. Rose, Jerry Ferrara, and Manny Pérez. It premiered at the 2007 Tribeca Film Festival, and was given a limited release in the United States by IFC Films on December 12, 2008. The title of the film is an old Italian saying that Stabile's father used to say about good places.

== Plot ==
Frank Diaz, an unemployed boxer, and his family have been living in a homeless shelter for months when, finally, on Christmas Eve, comes word that an apartment may be available. However seeing that he doesn't hold a job "on the books" the social worker tells him it's not possible for him to get the apartment. Frank, at his wit's end, tells a story about his time in the army during the first Gulf War. This story causes the social worker to give Frank a chance to get the apartment, if he can get a job before the end of the day.

Frank hits the cold streets of New York, his resentful stepson Justin in tow, to somehow find a job so that his family can have a real home for Christmas morning. They search all over town in hopes of a job. In their search they grow closer together while also learning secrets about each other. On his first stop in search for a job he goes to a construction contractor he's worked for 'off the books' but is denied a booked job. Throughout the movie you see an old man (the construction contractor's father) looking for Frank Diaz to give him a letter. Frank's efforts to find a job by six o'clock prove impossible. At one point he is offered a job painting a school, but the offer is withdrawn after a background check reveals a past felony.

Further efforts to find a job prove futile and Frank, after being forced to shoplift to get new clothes, accidentally leaves the money he needs for the apartment in the discarded clothes and can't go back to get it or risk being arrested. Ultimately he runs out of time and takes his family out for dinner instead. His wife tries to get him to leave so she can sneak out without paying like she usually does, but he doesn't let her do it. Outside their homeless shelter, Frank spots the man who stole his jacket earlier in the film and in a fit of anger and frustration, beats the man up and retrieves his jacket. While no charges are filed, Frank's actions get the family kicked out of the shelter and desperate, his wife calls her abusive ex for a place to stay, but Justin refuses to go with him, choosing to stay with Frank. This causes his wife to change her mind as well.

After checking another shelter and finding it full, the family heads for Brooklyn on a subway train to try a shelter there and play a game that they played before they became homeless. Music plays out as the fate of Frank and his family remain unknown to us. Yet his loss of the apartment stills gives a glum outcome for a family hit hard by poverty.

== Cast ==
- John Leguizamo as Frank Diaz
- Leonor Varela as Angela Diaz
- David Castro as Justin Diaz
- Samantha M. Rose as Christina Diaz
- Jerry Ferrara as Vinny
- Manny Pérez as Luis

== Reception ==
On the review aggregator website Rotten Tomatoes, 67% of 12 critics' reviews are positive.

Lisa Schwartzbaum of Entertainment Weekly described the film as "Italian neorealism meets A Christmas Carol." Nick Pinkerton of the Village Voice writes that Stabile "gets interesting scenes [...] though the movie's vérité is diluted by a cozy, adult-contemporary empathy with those less fortunate."
