= Miguel Ángel Martínez (actor) =

Dominican actor (1954–2025)

- Born: November 26, 1954; Sánchez Ramírez Province, Dominican Republic
- Died: August 23, 2025 (aged 70); Villa Progreso del Este, Santo Domingo Este, Dominican Republic
- Occupations: Actor, theatre director
- Years active: 1970s–2025

Miguel Ángel Martínez (November 26, 1954 – August 23, 2025) was a Dominican actor and theatre director.

== Life and career ==
Martínez was born in the Sánchez Ramírez province. He enrolled in the Autonomous University of Santo Domingo (UASD) to study psychology. After he decided to dedicate himself to acting. He acted in a number of feature films throughout his career, including Perico Ripiao (2003) La soga (2009), and Trópico de sangre (2010).

Throughout his career, Martínez participated in numerous theatrical productions in the Dominican Republic, performing in both classical and contemporary works. His stage credits included productions such as Antígona, Fuenteovejuna, Bodas de sangre, and other nationally staged plays.

In addition to his work in cinema and theatre, Martínez appeared in Dominican television productions and entertainment programs, contributing to the development of local audiovisual media.

Martínez died in Villa Progreso del Este, Santo Domingo Este on August 23, 2025.
