= Lordz of Brooklyn =

Hip-hop group from New York

- Promotional shoot circa 1995.

Background information
- Origin: Brooklyn, New York City, U.S.
- Genres: Hip-hop; Mafioso rap; rap rock; hardcore hip-hop
- Years active: 1992–present
- Labels: American; High Times
- Members: ADM; Mr. Kaves; Scotty Edge; Dino Bottz; Paulie Nugent; LORDDREW
- Website: lordzofbrooklyn.com

Lordz of Brooklyn is an American hip-hop group from New York. The group was started by brothers Michael McLeer (Kaves) and Adam McLeer (ADMoney) as the Verrazano Boys but eventually changed to Lordz of Brooklyn where they were joined by Dino Cerillo (Bottz), Paul Nugent (Paulie Two Times), and Scotty Westerman (Scotty Edge). In 1995, their debut album All in the Family, received favorable reviews and established them as a well known underground group.

Through the rest of the 90s, they would often collaborate with Everlast and in 2000 with Bumpy Knuckles they released the EP The Lordz of Brooklyn Meet Bumpy Knuckles. In 2003 they released the album Graffiti Roc which included collaborations by Busta Rhymes, Korn, Rampage, etc.

Rebranded as The Lordz, they released the album The Brooklyn Way (2006) and had a reality show by the same name a year later. While the group continued touring they eventually returned to their original name and released the album Family Reunion in 2020.

== Biography ==
=== 1980s-1995 ===
In the 1980s and early 1990s, fellow New Yorker Mike McLeer (Kaves) was an esteemed graffiti artist, while his brother Adam McLeer (ADMoney) was a Dj. The McLeer brothers are of mixed Italian, Russian, Irish, English, and Scottish descent. The pair got into breakdancing and would go on to meet rapper Chuck D, for whom Kaves worked on promotion, who suggested that they make demo tapes. Hence they founded the group the Verrazano Boys and eventually changed to Lordz of Brooklyn with a group of friends.

The group was initially formed in 1989, and joining the McLeer brothers was Scotty Westerman (Scotty Edge). In 1992, Dino Cerillo (Bottz), and Paul Nugent (Paulie Two Times) joined.

On June 7, 1994, Donna and Michele Blanchard, the mother and sister of ADM and Kaves aged 43 and 4 respectively, died from a hit-and-run in Brooklyn. It remains unsolved to this day. Kaves described his mother as a hippie who encouraged him and his brother to pursue their interest in hip hop.

In 1995, they released their debut All in the Family, signed to American Recordings/Ventrue. They group had to work hard to convince a label to welcome an Italian white group with gangland imagery. Kaves explained that the objective of the album is to take to on a train ride thought Brooklyn, and make an album that give his mother full credit on the support she gave him. Their first single "Saturday Night Fever" is a tribute to Kaves's favourite film by the same name. It became an underground success, especially among graffiti writers who identified with the content. It generally received favorable reviews. Paola Banchero of The Wichita Eagle, said there is "more musical twist than most hip-hop", described it as "gritty", and "good to listen while hanging out with the crew".

=== 1996 -2005 ===
In 1997 for soundtrack of the film Gravesend, they provided some exclusive songs.

In 2000, they released the vinyl EP The Lordz of Brooklyn Meet Bumpy Knuckles.

2000 also saw the release of the Lordz of Brooklyn cover version of Run-DMC's hip hop classic "Sucker M.C.'s" on the tribute album Take A Bite Outta Rhyme: A Rock Tribute to Rap. Their version featured Stoned Soul and Everlast.

In 2003 they released, Graffiti Roc. By this time the group consisted of the McLeer brothers as a duo. Their style leaned towards a crossover sound of both hip hop and rock influences. It featured Busta Rhymes, Korn, Rampage, Everlast, O.C., Freddie Foxxx, and Lord Finesse.

Live musicians were added, on guitar (Patrick Saccenti), bass and drums to tour festivals such as Vans Warped Tour in 2003, 2004 and 2005.

=== 2006–present ===
In 2006, the group shortened their name to "The Lordz" for the release of the third album The Brooklyn Way. Featured artists are Everlast, Bedouin Soundclash, and Tim Armstrong. Of this album Kaves said "the Lordz' music is positioned at the intersection of punk and hip-hop, and truly reflects its roots". Kaves said that the rebranding of the group's name was to avoid interference with their previous catalog.

After the release of the album, Kaves explained that Westerman rejoined the group for tours.

In April 2008, The Lordz had their own reality TV show on Fuse entitled The Brooklyn Way. The show featured footage Kaves shot over the years focusing on their daily lives. Also that year it was announced they would do their fifth stint with the Vans Warped Tour.

Since 2018, they have returned to their Hip-Hop origins, started to use the full name "Lordz Of Brooklyn".

In 2020, they released a new album Family Reunion, with the participation of Westerman and Nugent.

== Discography ==
- All in the Family (1995)
- Graffiti Roc (2003)
- The Brooklyn Way (2006)
- Family Reunion (2020)
