= Raquel Castro =

American actress and singer (born 1994)

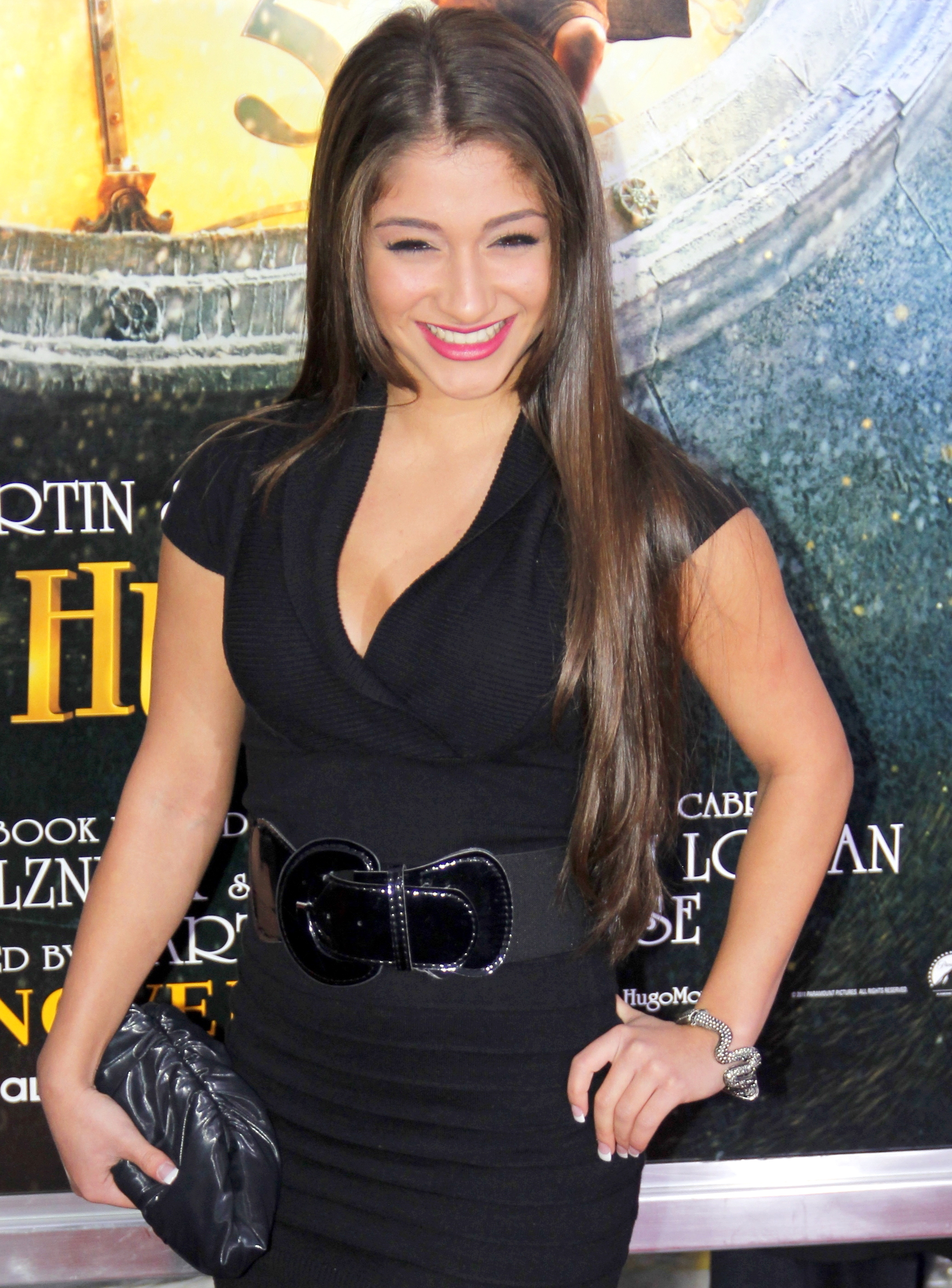
- Castro in 2011
- Born: November 17, 1994 (age 31)
- Occupations: Actress, singer
- Years active: 2002–present
- Relatives: David Castro (brother)
- Musical career
- Genres: Pop, R&B
- Years active: 2011–present
- Website: raquelcastro.com

Raquel Castro (born November 17, 1994) is an American actress and singer. She is known for starring in the 2004 film Jersey Girl as Gertie Trinké, the daughter of Ollie Trinké (Ben Affleck) and Gertrude Steiney (Jennifer Lopez), for which Castro won the Young Artist Award for the Best Performance in a Feature Film – Young Actress Age Ten or Younger. She was a contestant in the American version of The Voice.

== Background ==
Castro's father is Puerto Rican, and her mother is of Italian and Jewish descent.

== Career ==
=== Acting ===
Castro made her acting debut in an episode of the television series, Third Watch. She then played the daughter of Ben Affleck and Jennifer Lopez's characters in the 2004 film Jersey Girl, directed by Kevin Smith. She appeared in a 2005 episode of Law & Order: Special Victims Unit entitled "Alien" and in the independent film Little Fugitive. Castro appeared in two second-season episodes of Liv & Maddie ("BFF-A-Rooney" and "SPARF-A-Rooney") as Liv's friend South Salamanca.

In 2006, she was cast as Nicole in the music video for the Ludacris song "Runaway Love" with Mary J. Blige, where she plays an abused self-conscious girl who runs away. She later was featured in the 2007 independent film, Tracks of Color. She has a role in The Ministers (2009), starring John Leguizamo. Raquel also spent quite a few years at a dance studio with her younger brother on Long Island.

=== Singing ===
Castro was a contestant on the first season of the reality television singing competition program The Voice, She was selected in the Blind Audition round and was coached by Christina Aguilera. She progressed to the first round of the Live shows before being eliminated with Lily Elise in favor of Frenchie Davis and Beverly McClellan.

Castro recorded a cover of Aguilera's "Ain't No Other Man" and posted it on YouTube. Castro has listed Aguilera as well as Selena as her idols and major influences.

Castro released her first single titled "Diary". According to her YouTube page, the song was written by Alyssa Bonagura and Ted Bruner. It was produced by J Chris Griffin. It was released on iTunes and CDBaby on February 1, 2012. She uploaded the music video for "Diary" on YouTube and recorded a dance remix of the song, released on March 11, 2012. The remix was released under the title "Diary (J Chris Griffin Remix)". She also started working on her debut album, however as of 2026 she is yet to release an album.

A single called "Game Over" was released on January 29, 2013. Castro wrote it with the help of Inspire and Develop Artists, a coaching program for emerging musical artists run by David Frangioni with Mark Hudson, Rudy Pérez and Jon Secada.

In 2019, Castro provided vocals for the theme song to the Netflix Original Series Carmen Sandiego. The following year Castro was on a season 2 episode of NBC's Songland; she presented her song "Wrong Places" to H.E.R., who selected it and released it as a single.

== Filmography ==
Film
Year	Title	Role	Notes
2004	Jersey Girl	Gertie Trinké	Film debut
2006	Little Fugitive	Destiny	Remake
2007	Tracks of Color	Carmen	Short film
2009	America	Liza	
2009	The Ministers	Nereida	
2010	Brooklyn's Finest	Katherine	
2016	From Nowhere	Alyssa	
2017	Heavenly Charm	Izabella Sanchez	Starring role
2017	Ten	Lori	
2019	Already Gone	Carmen	
2021	This Is the Night	Anna Tocci	

Television
Year	Title	Role	Notes
2002	Third Watch	Moira Kenney	Episode: "The Greater Good"
2005	Law & Order: Special Victims Unit	Emma Boyd	Episode: "Alien"
2011	The Voice	Herself	Season 1 contestant; member of Christina Aguilera's team
2011	Wingin' It	JenJen	Episode: "Heaven Must Be Missing an Angel"
2014	Awkward	Shiri	Episode: "Touched by an Angel"
2014–2015	Liv and Maddie	South Salamanca	Episodes: "BFF-A-Rooney" and "SPARF-A-Rooney"
2015–2016	Empire	Marisol	6 episodes
2016	Blue Bloods	Martina Fernandez	Episode: "The Road to Hell"
2020	Songland	Herself	Episode: "H.E.R."

== Discography ==
=== Albums as part of Empire cast ===
Year	Artist	Album	Notes
2015 :	Empire cast	Empire: Season 2 Volume 1	Track 9: "Runnin'"
2016 :	Empire cast	Empire: Season 2 Volume 2	Track 2: "Crown"

=== Singles ===
Year	Song	Album	Notes
2012	"Diary"	Non-album single	
2019	"So Much More"	Non-album single	With ONEDUO

=== Music videos ===
Year	Video	Director
2012 :	"Diary"	Roman Dent

=== Songwriting credits ===
Song	Year	Artist	Album
"Wrong Places"	2020	H.E.R.	Non-album single
"No More Disco"	2026	Yeonjun	No Labels: Part 02

== Awards and nominations ==
Year	Group	Award	Result	Film
2005 :	Young Artist Award	Best Performance in a Feature Film – Young Actress Age Ten or Younger	Won	Jersey Girl
