= All in the Family (album) =

Studio album by Lordz of Brooklyn
- Released: April 18, 1995
- Recorded: 1994–95
- Genre: Hardcore hip-hop; Mafioso rap
- Label: American Recordings/Ventrue
- Producer: Adam Gozzola, AdMoney

Lordz of Brooklyn chronology
All in the Family (1995)	Graffiti Roc (2003)

All in the Family is the debut studio album from Lordz of Brooklyn. It was released on April 18, 1995, by American Recordings.

The group members were Mike McLeer (Kaves), his brother Adam McLeer (ADMoney), Dino Cerillo (Bottz), Paul Nugent (Paulie Two Times), and Scotty Westerman (Scotty Edge). They had a difficult time finding a label, interested in gang related rap group with an Italian image. Furthermore, the group was struck by tragedy when the mother and sister of the McLeer brothers was killed in a hit-and-run incident. The goal of the album was to capture the spirit of Brooklyn, and "Saturday Nite Fever" was their single.

The album generally received favorable reviews, reflecting its unique approach within the hip-hop genre. Many praised its creativity and musical innovation, with some highlighting its ability to blend rap grooves with melodic elements that elevate the listening experience. It was described as gritty and engaging, with intelligent lyrics delivered at a rapid yet clear pace. Thematically, the album was noted for its cohesive concept and raw, streetwise authenticity, resonating particularly with 1990s graffiti culture.

== Conception ==
The group consisted of Mike McLeer (Kaves), his brother Adam McLeer (ADMoney), Dino Cerillo (Bottz), Paul Nugent (Paulie Two Times), and Scotty Westerman (Scotty Edge). Kaves explained that the objective of the album is to take to on a train ride thought Brooklyn, where he spent much of his youth doing graffiti, which is why they started the album with the sound of the transit train passing by.

They group had to work hard to convince a label to welcome an Italian group with gangland imagery. Another challenge that they had making the album is that a year prior the mother and four years old sister of the McLeer brothers were killed in a hit-and-run collision. Kaves explained that she was very supportive of their musical endeavours and wanted to make an album that give her full credit on her contribution.

Their first single "Saturday Nite Fever" is a tribute to Kaves's favorite film by the same name. Also they sent their CDs to reviewers in pizza boxes.

== Reception ==
Katherine Monk of The Vancouver Sun gave it four stars, explaining that "it is a shinning example of creativity in a genre that suffers from moribund repetition". Joe Nardone Jr. of The Weekender said that "if you like House of Pain, check out the Lordz of Brooklyn to get your adrenaline pumping". James Dickerson of The Columbian gave it three stars and wrote that what they "do well is spike their rap groove with melody lines that lift their music a notch above what we have to think of as traditional rap". Will Ashon of Muzik did not like the album and gave it one and a half stars, finding it flat and lacking variations.

Scott L. Miley of The Indianapolis Star also didn't think fondly of the album, giving it one star and a half, and describing them as dock workers imitating Cypress Hill and Beastie Boys. In The Philadelphia Inquirer, Faith Quintavell gave it 3 stars and described them as "The Lordz of Brando-esque" whose "voices and tag-team delivery of rhymes completed a well executed concept". In The San Bernardino Sun, Jim Harrington gave it a seven out of ten, saying that they "rap at a manic pace, and the lyrics are still understandable and intelligent". Paola Banchero of The Wichita Eagle said that there is "more musical twist than most hip-hop", and described it as "gritty", and "good to listen while hanging out with the crew".

John Lawrence of The Pop Break described it as "an absolute masterpiece" and "an album that hit on all cylinders, and for many graffiti writers of the 90’s, it was their theme music".

== Track listing ==
1. Saturday Nite Fever - 4:04
2. Papers - 3:32
3. Brooklyn Pride - 3:55
4. The Bad Racket - 3:45
5. White Trash - 5:12
6. American Made - 3:25
7. Tails from the Rails - 4:12
8. Out ta Bomb - 3:27
9. Can Ya Dig It - 2:54
10. Pull Your Card - 4:03
11. Unda the Boardwalk - 3:54
12. L.O.B. Sound - 4:16
