= Alfredo De Villa =

Mexican director

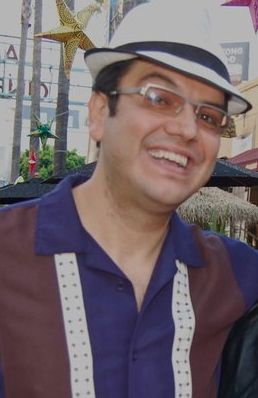
- De Villa, July 2011
- Born: Puebla, Mexico
- Education: University of Miami (BA) Columbia University (MFA)
- Occupation: Director
- Years active: 1996–present
- Website: www.alfredodevilla.com

Alfredo De Villa is a Mexican director. He is best known for directing award winning films such as Adrift in Manhattan, which was nominated for the Grand Jury Prize at the Sundance Film Festival in 2007, and Washington Heights, which won a special mention for directing and acting at the Tribeca Film Festival.

== Early life ==
De Villa was born in Puebla, Mexico. He earned his Bachelor of Arts from the University of Miami and his Master of Fine Arts from the film division of Columbia University, with an emphasis in directing.

== Career ==
De Villa's two short films, Joe’s Egg and Neto’s Run were both awarded the Best Latino Director Award from the Directors Guild of America in 1995 and 1999, he is the only filmmaker to be awarded this honor twice. De Villa has gone on to direct many acclaimed feature films.

== Personal life ==
De Villa currently resides in Los Angeles, California.

== Filmography ==
=== Film ===
- Fugly! (2013)
- Harlistas: An American Journey (2011)
- Nothing like the Holidays (2008)
- Adrift in Manhattan (2007)
- Yellow (2006)
- Washington Heights (2002)
- Neto's Run (1998)
- Joe's Egg (1995)

== Awards and nominations ==
Sundance Film Festival

- Nominated, Grand Jury Prize: Adrift in Manhattan (2007)

San Diego Film Festival

- Winner, Best Director: Adrift in Manhattan (2007)

Indianapolis International Film Festival

- Winner, Best Narrative Feature: Adrift in Manhattan (2007)

Gotham Awards

- Nominated, Open Palm Award: Washington Heights (2003)

Austin Film Festival

- Winner, Best Feature Film Washington Heights (2002)

Los Angeles Film Festival

- Winner, Audience Award, Best Feature Film Washington Heights (2002)

Tribeca Film Festival

- Winner, Special Mention for Washington Heights (2002)
