= J. Chris Griffin =

J. Chris Griffin is an American record producer and mix engineer living in New York City, operating from a private studio at The Engine Room Audio in the Financial District, Manhattan.

Griffin has worked on records with a number of popular artists, including Madonna, Kanye West, John Legend, Missy Elliott, Janet Jackson, The Corrs, Mis-Teeq, JoJo, and John McLaughlin. Griffin has also worked with Raquel Castro of NBC's The Voice, GLEE's Charice, Christian group Big Tent Revival and others.

His personal works can be found throughout network television on prime-time shows in the United States, Australia, United Kingdom, South Africa, Norway, Sweden, Denmark and Mexico. Some major programs featuring his tracks are CBS's NCIS, NBC's Dateline and MTV's original Made.

In addition to making records, Griffin was also a Pro-Reviewer for Broadjam, a site where artists have the opportunity to collaborate, interact, and receive feedback from other artists. Griffin also conducts private vocal coachings within his studio, prepping young artists for auditions, recording sessions, and live shows, and instructs a recording technology class at New York University's Steinhardt School of Culture, Education, and Human Development.

Griffin globally represents Auto-Tune, Reason Studios, AVID, and Sibelius as an artist and clinician and has released products paired with M-Audio. Prior engagements include the Monterey Jazz Festival, Luthman Scandinavia Tour and the Main Stage at the Winter NAMM Show in 2007 and 2008.

== Artists produced / mixed / engineered ==
- Kanye West
- John Legend
- Josh London
- Madonna
- Missy Elliott
- Janet Jackson
- John McLaughlin
- JoJo
- The Corrs
- Mis-Teeq
- Nathan Leigh Jones
- Rachel Panay
- Danielle Bollinger
- Osha Kai
- Pepper Mache
- Georgie Porgie
- Simone Denney
- Natalia
- Josh Harris
- Cheryl Engelhardt
- LHS Jazz Ensemble
- The New Empires
- Raquel Castro
- Charice
- Robin Tucker

== Television ==
- CBS's NCIS
- NBC's Dateline
- MTV's Made
- MSNBC's MSNBC Investigates
- America's Most Wanted
- Prime-time shows in US, Australia, Europe, South Africa, and Mexico

== Sound design ==
- McDSP
- Propellerheads
- M-Audio
- Ultimate Sound Bank
- Reason
