= David Castro =

American actor

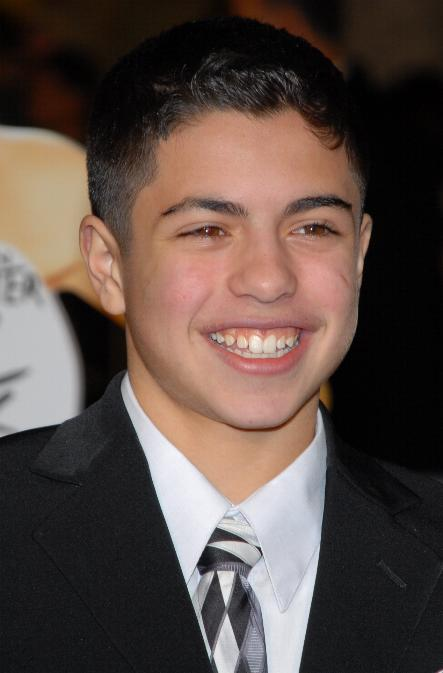
- David Castro at the 27 Dresses premiere in 2008
- Born: February 7, 1996 (age 30); Long Island, New York, U.S.
- Occupation: Actor
- Years active: 2004–present
- Relatives: Raquel Castro (sister)

David Castro (born February 7, 1996) is an American actor, known for his role as Raphael Santiago on the Freeform fantasy series Shadowhunters.

== Personal life ==
Castro was born on Long Island, New York to a Puerto Rican father, Albee Castro, and Kathleen, an American mother of Italian and Jewish descent. He has three older sisters and an older brother and currently lives in Long Island, New York.

== Career ==
Castro made his acting debut in the 2004 film Palindromes. He later appeared in the 2006 independent films, A Guide to Recognizing Your Saints and Little Fugitive, alongside his sister Raquel. In 2007, he was featured in the independent film, Tracks of Color and the film Where God Left His Shoes.

He had a role in the 2008 film 27 Dresses, starring Katherine Heigl and the 2009 film The Ministers, starring John Leguizamo. He recently starred in Forged with Manny Perez directed by William Wedig and played Raphael Santiago in the Shadowhunters television series from 2016 to 2019.

== Filmography ==
Film roles
Year	Film	Role	Notes
2004	Palindromes	Carlito	
2006	A Guide to Recognizing Your Saints	Reaper's Little Brother	
2006	Bella	David	
2006	Little Fugitive	Joey	
2007	Arranged	Eddie	
2007	Where God Left His Shoes	Justin Diaz	
2007	Tracks of Color	Luis Martinez	
2008	27 Dresses	Pedro	
2009	The Ministers	Dante / Perfecto (age 10)	
2010	Forged	Machito	
2011	Fugly!	Ray "Kid Ray"	
2012	Tio Papi	Manny	
2019	Ruta Madre	Daniel	

Television roles
Year	Title	Role	Notes
2011	Are We There Yet?	Frankie DeCosmo	Episodes: "The Test Taker Episode", "The Lindsey Goes Vegan Episode"
2016-2019	Shadowhunters	Raphael Santiago	Recurring role, 25 episodes
2016	Blue Bloods	Louis Edwards	Episode: "The Greater Good"
2020	God Friended Me	Private Joseph Martinez	Episode: "Raspberry Pie"
2022	Power Book III: Raising Kanan	Marco Boselli	4 episodes
2025	Law & Order	Ernesto Ruiz	Episode: "Sins of the Father"

== Awards and nominations ==
Year	Group	Award	Role	Result	Refs
2008	Imagen Award	Best Supporting Actor	Where God Left His Shoes	Nominated	

== See also ==
- Jewish immigration to Puerto Rico
- List of Puerto Ricans
