= Carlos León Escudero =

Spanish artist (born 1948)

Carlos León Escudero (Ceuta, 8 March 1948) is a Spanish artist with a long trajectory, associated with abstraction. His work displays a landscape of imagination where the subject takes a backseat to the pictorial exploration of color, texture, and surface. A multidisciplinary artist, he adds to his pictorial production a vast array of installations, sculptural pieces, and photographs. In 2022, he was awarded the Gold Medal of Fine Arts Merit by the Ministry of Culture of Spain.

== Biography ==
Born in Ceuta in 1948, his family moved to Segovia when he was three years old. Having started his studies in Medicine at the University of Valladolid, he decided to abandon them in 1968 to fully devote himself to painting.

In 1972, he spent a year in Paris, where he attended the open studios of École des Beaux-Arts and came into contact with the critic Marcelin Pleynet and the painters who published the magazine "Peinture, cahiers théoriques." During those years, he took part in the exhibition "10 Abstractos" in 1975, organized by the Buades Gallery in Madrid, with works that contributed to the introduction of the "Support-surfaces" movement in Spain. A year later, he held his first solo exhibition at the Juan Mas Gallery in Madrid and was selected to participate in the Spanish Pavilion of the Venice Biennale.

In 1979, he spent another year in Paris on a scholarship from the Juan March Foundation, and in 1985, he moved to New York with a grant awarded by the Joint Spanish-American Committee. He was selected to be a part of the "Triangle Artist workshop" held in New York under the direction of Anthony Caro.

In 1987, he was chosen as a member of the Board of Directors of the Circle of Fine Arts in Madrid and was hired as an associate professor by the Faculty of Fine Arts in Cuenca, where he served as Dean for two years. In 1991, he left his teaching position and in 1995, he moved back to New York, where he resided and worked until 2002, when he decided to return to Spain, where he has continued his artistic activity to the present day.

== Style ==
Linked to the French Supports-surfaces movement in the 1970s, a movement he introduced to Spain, his work has always been associated with abstract expressionism. Lyricism, the evocation of landscapes and gardens, the body as a locus, carnality, and anguish characterize his painting. His enduring affinity for geometry has remained a constant presence, more or less explicitly, throughout his entire career, becoming more pronounced in the 1970s, in works exhibited at the Gamarra-Garrigues Gallery in '91, and in a significant portion of his recent repertoire.

The use of new materials such as translucent polyester sheets has enabled him to achieve, through layering, a geometric mode constructed through glazing, of great subtlety and added conceptual interest. This approach tempers his expressionist gestures with an almost imperceptible grid, placing his painting in the dialectic between the instinctual and the encoded, as discussed in Julia Kristeva's Semiotics.

Always intrigued by the support from a conceptual standpoint, he undertakes his latest works on dibond - an industrial, cold, and anonymous composite aluminum panel - upon which he paints with his hands.

The layering of painted sheets on translucent supports, the combination of physically distinct elements within a single artwork, the break from certain conventions of the object-canvas, the use of industrial materials, and the application of pigment with his hands constitute his field of work.

In his latest works, he delves with particular interest into the interplay of relationships—both artistic and conceptual—that emerge between the radical questioning of all illusionism that his painting proposes and the refined practice of three-dimensional production.

The artist has produced a series of sculptural works that combine object-oriented approaches with the use of found objects. These methods involve installation and assemblage and are present in his most recent works.

== Works in public collections ==
- Museo Nacional Centro de Arte Reina Sofía, Madrid, España
- Colección Ayuntamiento de Barcelona, España
- Colección Banco de España, Madrid, España
- Colección Citibank, Madrid, España
- Colección Comunidad Autónoma de Madrid, España
- Fundación Helga de Alvear, Cáceres, Expaña
- Colección Triangle Artist Workshop, New York, EE.UU.
- Museo de Bellas Artes de Bilbao, España
- Centre of Contemporary Art. Cleveland. Ohio, EE.UU.
- Colección Caja Madrid, España
- CAM, Caja de Ahorros del Mediterráneo, Alicante, España
- Portland Museum, Clement Greenbergs legacy, EE.UU.
- Colección Caja Segovia, España
- Museo Municipal, Madrid, España
- Fundación La Caixa, España
- Colección Fundación Mer, España
- MUSAC, Museo de Arte Contemporáneo de Castilla y León, León, España
- Museo Patio Herreriano, Valladolid, España
