= La soga =

- International Poster
- Directed by: Josh Crook
- Written by: Manny Pérez (story)
- Produced by: Josh Crook; Manny Pérez
- Starring: Manny Pérez; Denise Quiñones; Paul Calderón; Juan Fernández; Hemky Madera; Jaime Tirelli; Margo Martindale; Joseph Lyle Taylor; Celines Toribio; Ulysses Terrero; Anaís Martinez; Miguel Ángel Martínez
- Cinematography: Zeus Morand
- Music by: Evan Wilson
- Release date: September 12, 2009 (TIFF)
- Running time: 103 minutes
- Country: Dominican Republic
- Language: Spanish

La Soga ("The Rope") is a 2009 action film directed by Josh Crook starring Manny Pérez and Denise Quiñones. It tells the story of Luisito, a brave man who risks everything to find justice. The film is a story of redemption set in the neighborhoods of the Dominican Republic and Washington Heights, New York, United States.

== Production ==
Manny Perez wrote and starred in the film directed by Josh Crook and shot in New York City, in Santiago and in his nearby native town Baitoa.

== Awards ==
La Soga has been nominated at Oaxaca Film Fest.

== Box office and reception ==
La Soga received mixed reviews and maintains a 50% "rotten" rating on the Rotten Tomatoes website. The film's domestic box office gross currently stands at $161,832.
