= Gottfried Wedig =

German painter

Gotthardt Wedig
- Born: 1583; Cologne
- Died: 22 December 1641 (aged 57–58); Cologne

Gotthardt Wedig (1583 – 1641) was a 17th-century German painter.

Wedig was born in Cologne as the grandson of Barthel Bruyn the Younger who probably taught him to paint. He is known for portraits and still lifes. His first name is spelled in various ways and some sources refer to him as "G. von Wedig" of "G. de Wedig". He is known for portraits and still life paintings that he signed with a monogram "GDW".

Portraits:

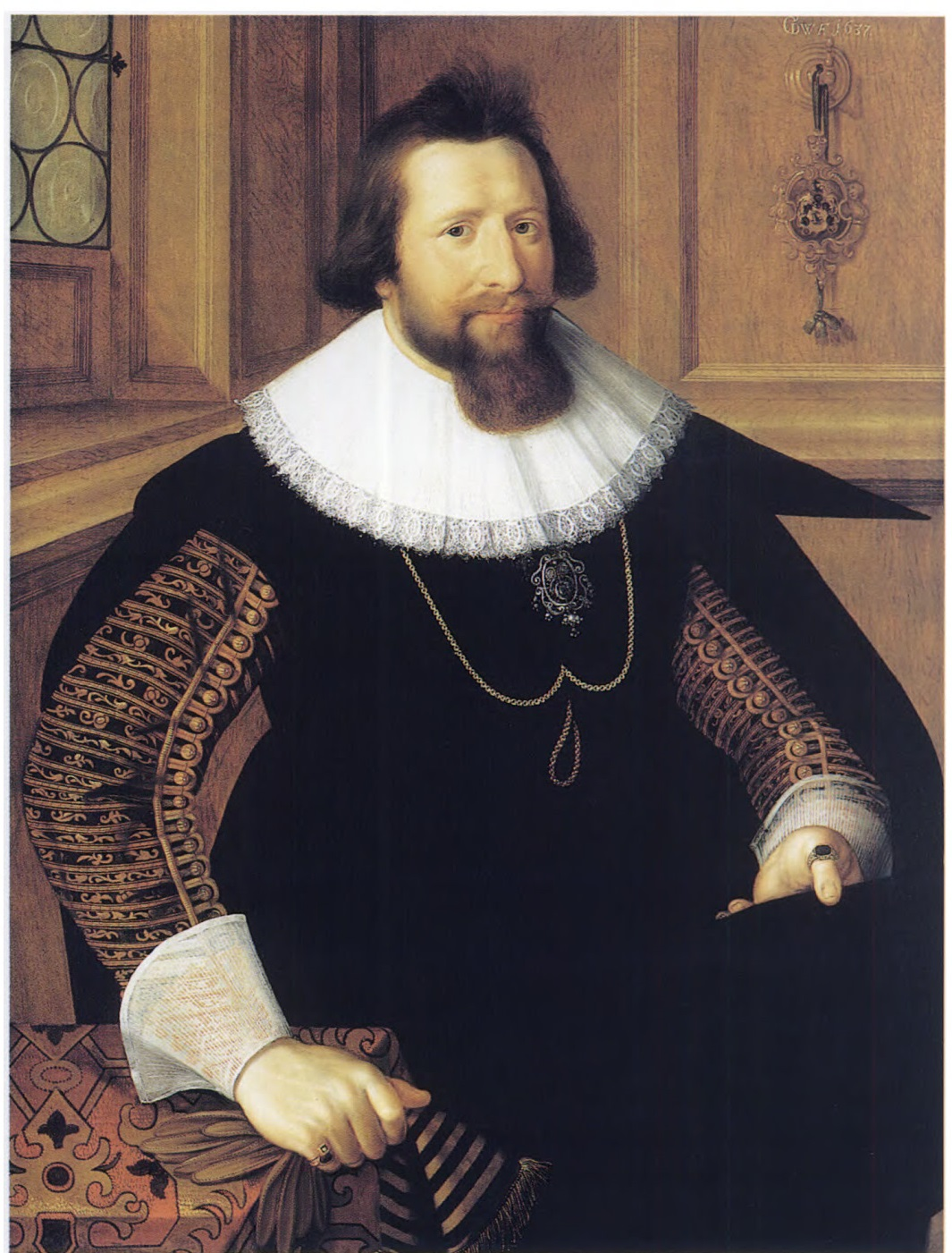
1637 portrait of a man named Beywegh, a councilman of Cologne

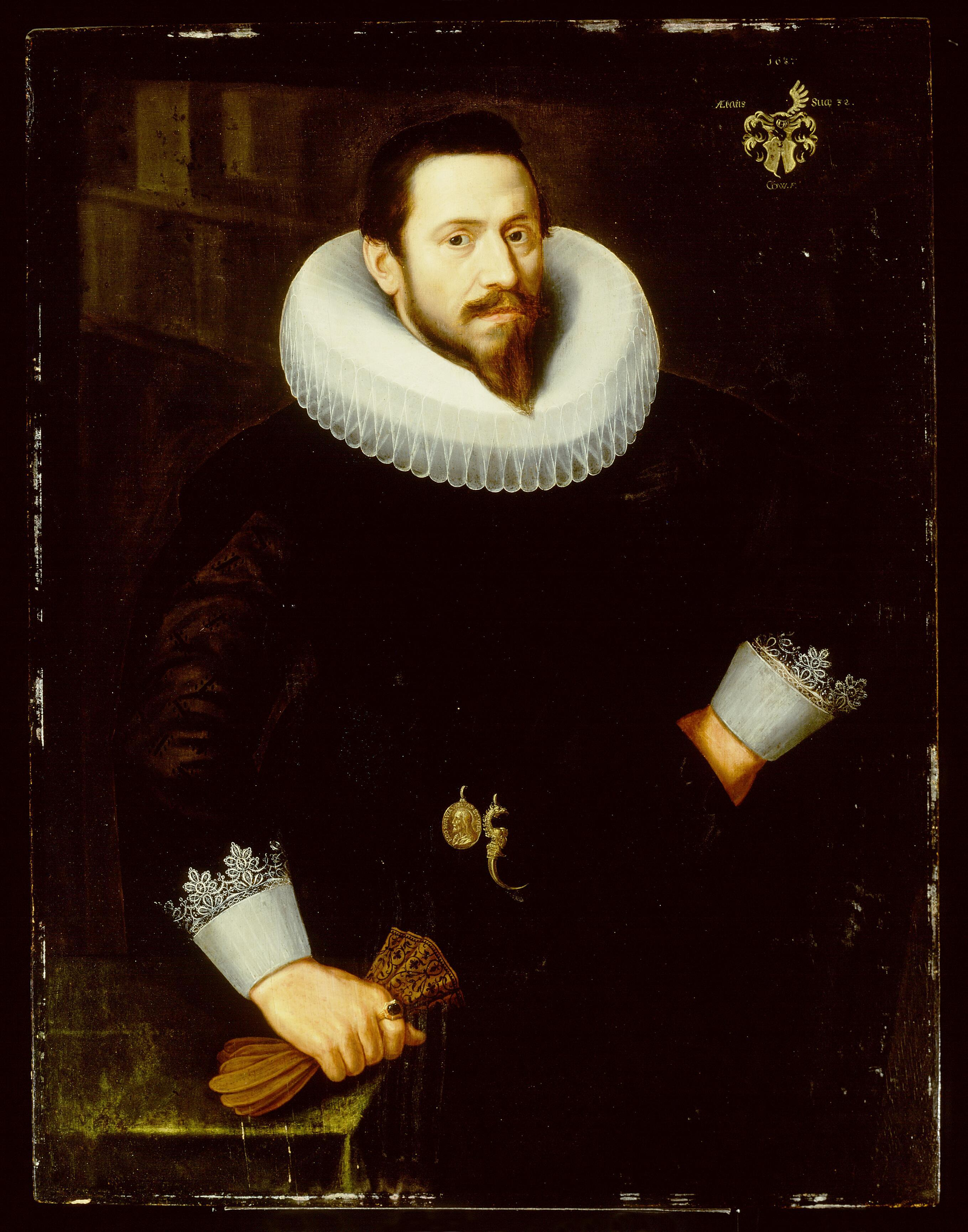
Pieter Ostermaan, 1627

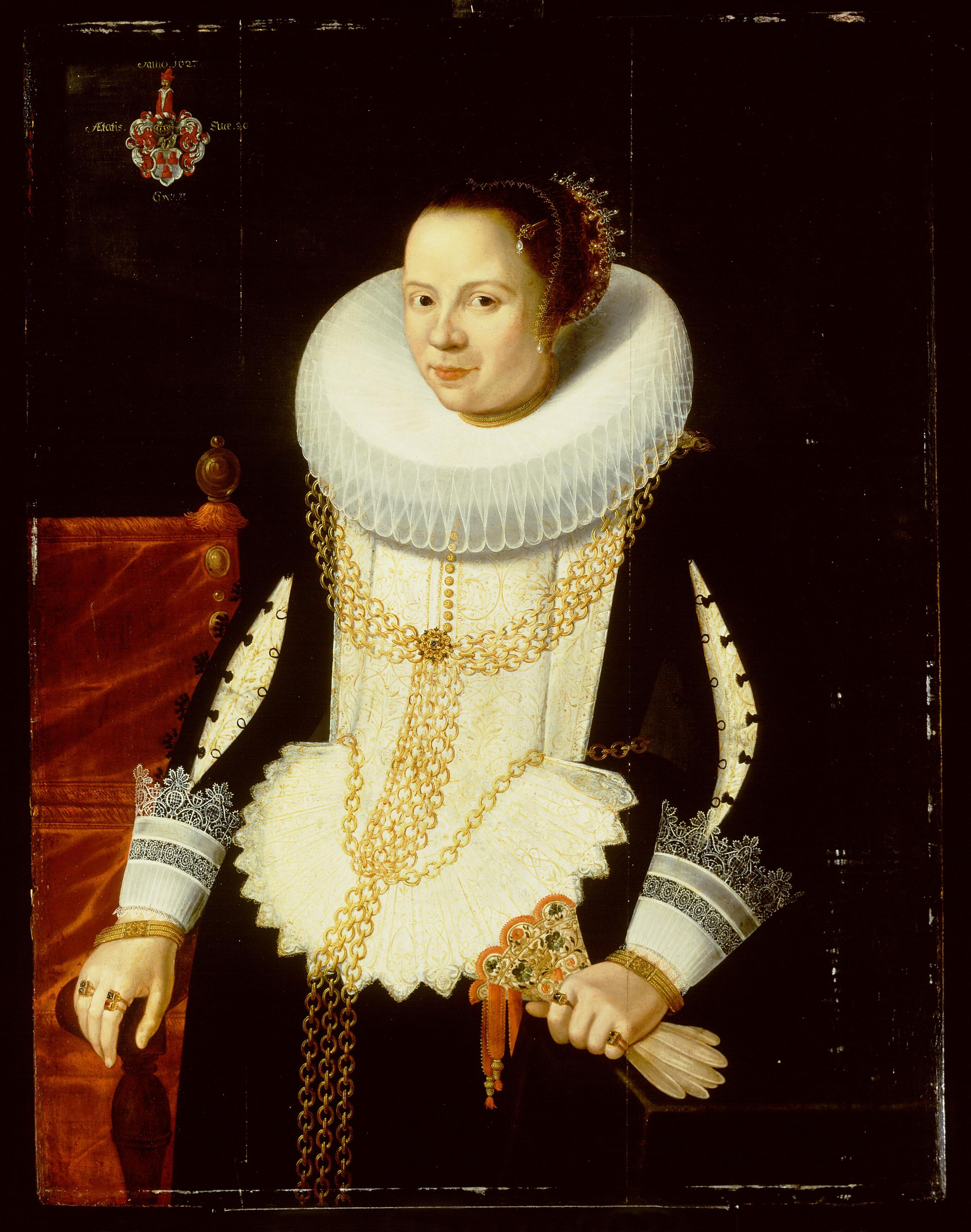
Gertrud Kiever, wife of Pieter Ostermaan, 1627

Still-lifes:

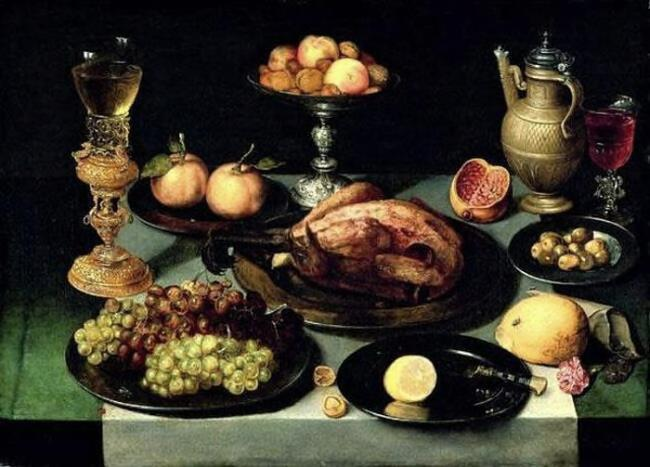
Laid table with a roast chicken and goblet holder

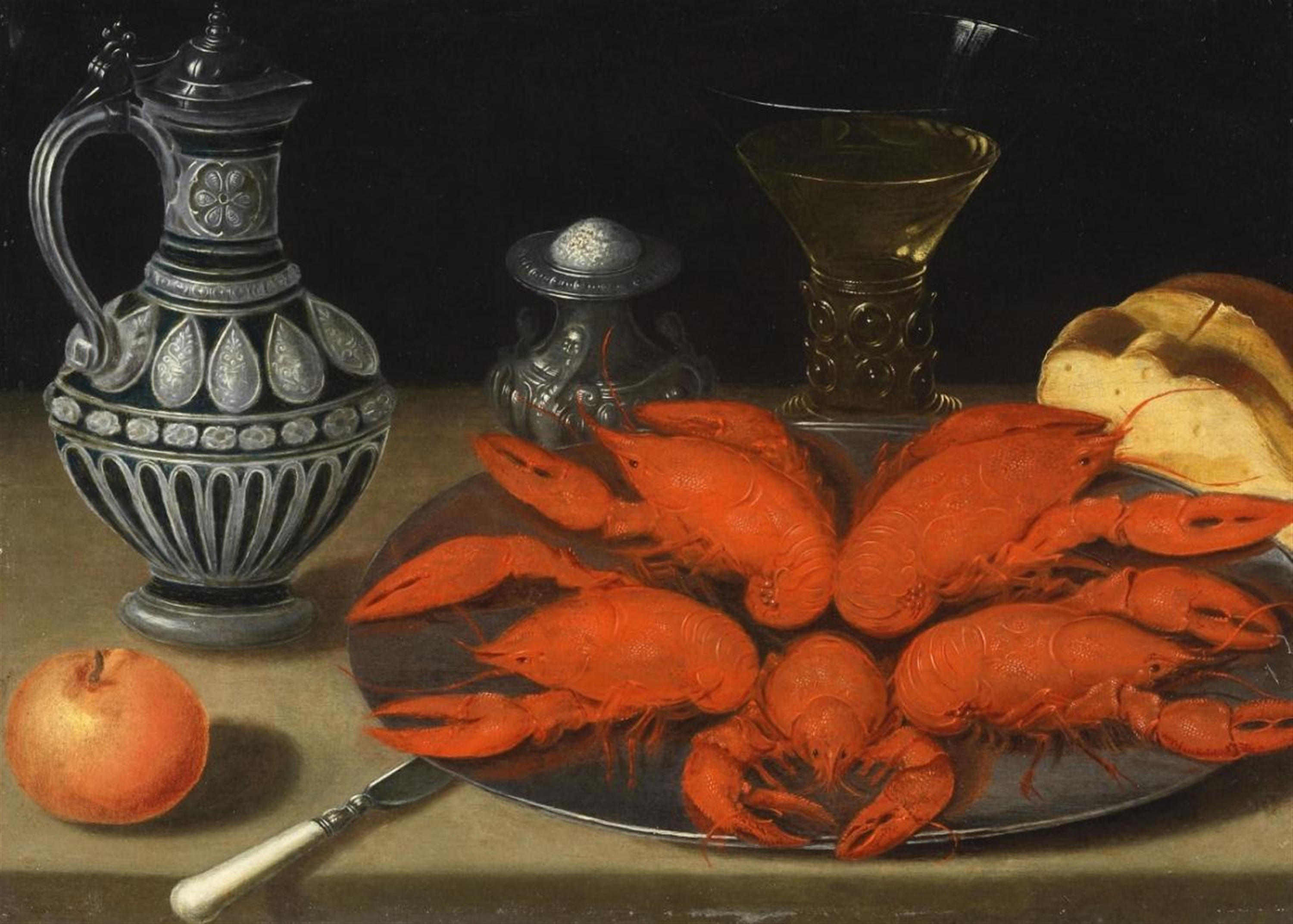
Laid table with lobster meal, Lempertz
