= William Wedig =

American filmmaker

- Born: William Wedig; November 3, 1983 (age 41); Marietta, Ohio, United States
- Occupation(s): film director, editor

William "Will" Wedig is an American film editor and director.

== Biography ==
His most recent work includes directing 2011 Forged (film) and Exposure: Sports Illustrated Swimsuit 2011. Wedig also directed the 2007 horror film Rise of the Dead (film)., post-supervised La Soga, and edited a documentary, The Life a House Built: The 25th Anniversary of the Jimmy and Rosalynn Carter Work Project, for This Old House for PBS. His other works are Tryst, La Soga and Salvage.

== Personal ==
Growing up in Marietta, Ohio, William began making films around ages 10 or 11. He graduated with a degree in film editing from the School of Visual Arts in New York City in 2006.
