= Little Fugitive (2006 film) =

2006 film by Joanna Lipper

- Directed by: Joanna Lipper
- Screenplay by: Joanna Lipper
- Based on: Little Fugitive; 1953 film by Raymond Abrashkin; Morris Engel; Ruth Orkin
- Produced by: Nicholas Paleologos
- Starring: David Castro; Nicolas Martí Salgado; Justina Machado; Peter Dinklage
- Cinematography: Richard Sands
- Edited by: Keith Reamer
- Music by: Barrington Pheloung
- Production companies: Little Fugitive LLC, Ruby Slipper Productions
- Release date: May 27, 2006 (Seattle International Film Festival)
- Running time: 90 minutes
- Country: United States
- Language: English

Little Fugitive is a 2006 remake of the 1953 film of the same name. It was directed by Joanna Lipper and produced by Nicholas Paleologos. The film is set in present day Brooklyn and tells the story of 11-year-old Lenny (Nicolas Martí Salgado) who must take care of his 7-year-old brother, Joey (David Castro), while their father (Peter Dinklage) is in jail and their mother works long hours a nursing home. When Lenny plays a practical joke on Joey that goes too far, Joey soon runs away to Coney Island.

== Cast ==
Actor	Role
David Castro	Joey
Nicolas Martí Salgado	Lenny
Peter Dinklage	Sam (father of Lenny and Joey)
Justina Machado	Natalia (mother of Lenny and Joey)
Raquel Castro	Destiny
Dianne Mazzaro	Ava
Shortee Red	Malcolm
Javier Picayo	Caleb
Brendan Sexton III	Frank
Rob Lok	Magician (as Robert Lok)
Sophie Dahl	Mermaid model
Austin Talynn Carpenter	Grace
Joseph Mosso	Sgt. Brenner
Fenton Lawless	Sgt. Ralston
Lois Smith	Social worker

== Release ==
Date	Location	Category	Award	Ref
27 May 2006	Seattle International Film Festival	—	—	
8 June 2006	Brooklyn Film Festival	Narrative feature	Best editing	
22 April 2007	Newport Beach Film Festival	—	—	

== Critical response ==
The film was well received by critics. The Economist has described it as “an assured mixture of charm and depth”, L Magazine found it “a lovely ode to childhood and to Brooklyn”.
