= Yellow (2006 feature film) =

2006 film by Alfredo De Villa

- Film poster
- Directed by: Alfredo De Villa
- Written by: Nacoma Whobrey; Roselyn Sanchez
- Produced by: Steven Brown; Dennis Murphy; Roselyn Sanchez
- Starring: Roselyn Sanchez; Bill Duke; D. B. Sweeney
- Distributed by: Hannibal Pictures; Sony Pictures Entertainment
- Release date: 2006
- Running time: 90 minutes
- Country: United States
- Languages: English; Spanish

Yellow is a 2006 American film directed by Alfredo De Villa and starring Roselyn Sanchez, Bill Duke, and D. B. Sweeney.

== Plot ==
Amarillys Campos is a classically trained Puerto Rican dancer who moves to New York City after her father's suicide to pursue her dreams of becoming a famous dancer, but ends up becoming a stripper at a seedy nightclub to make ends meet. Upon her arrival to New York, she moves into a ratty apartment and becomes close with her neighbor, Miles, a former professor of poetry at New York University who currently works at a supermarket due to the fact that he has become mentally unstable. While working as a stripper, she meets a lonely doctor Christian Kyle who feels the need to protect her, and the two begin a relationship. When the doctor proposes that they move to Australia, Amarillys must decide between her lifelong desire to be a famous dancer, mending a relationship with her family back in Puerto Rico, and taking a chance with her new love.

== Cast ==
- Roselyn Sanchez - Amarillys
- Bill Duke - Miles Emory
- D. B. Sweeney - Christian Kyle

== Reception ==
"Directed by Alfredo Da Villa and scripted by makeup artist Nacoma Whobrey, Amaryllis' story unfolds in the kind of New York where people leave their doors open, landlords pay no attention to who's living in their rental apartments, and strip-club owners take a purely paternal interest in the young women who work for them. For all its "follow your dreams, stay true to your ideals" message, it's Yellow's elaborately staged routines that take center stage. The fact that Sanchez has real-world dance training is evident, though probably of little consequence to the fans she'll make through her enthusiastic gyrations," commented TV Guide. The German website TV Today assessed the film as follows: "A racy beauty, hot dances and lots of skin. As a male fantasy made flesh, Roselyn Sanchez lets you sometimes overlook the mundane story and its confusing subplots."

Another review called the film a "Latin remake of Showgirls."
