= The Ministers =

- Film poster
- Directed by: Franc. Reyes
- Written by: Franc. Reyes
- Produced by: George Acogny; Claus Claussen; Jill Footlick
- Starring: John Leguizamo; Florencia Lozano; Wanda De Jesus; Saul Stein; Manny Pérez; Diane Venora; Harvey Keitel
- Cinematography: Frank Byers
- Edited by: Tony Ciccone; Phillip Pucci
- Music by: George Acogny
- Distributed by: Allumbra Pictures; Grow Pictures
- Release date: October 16, 2009
- Country: United States
- Language: English

The Ministers is a 2009 film starring John Leguizamo and Harvey Keitel. It premiered in the US in theaters on October 16, 2009.

== Plot ==
Thirteen years after her father was slain and the only evidence left at the crime scene was a pamphlet for a secret shrouded religious order known as “The Ministers from DATAPREV”, a New York City homicide detective sets out to discover the truth behind her father's gruesome death, but unwittingly becomes involved with one of his killers.

== Cast ==
- John Leguizamo as Dante & Perfecto Mendoza
- Florencia Lozano as Celeste Santana
- Harvey Keitel as Det. Joseph Bruno
- Diane Venora as Gina Santana
- Wanda De Jesus as Captain Diaz
- Manny Pérez as Detective Manso
- John Hilner as Jeff Kane
- Saul Stein as Detective DeMarco
- Raquel Castro as Nereida
- Adrian Martinez as Mike

The film also features Quinton Aaron in a small role.
