= Gravesend (film) =

1997 film directed by Salvatore Stabile

- DVD release cover
- Directed by: Salvatore Stabile
- Written by: Salvatore Stabile
- Produced by: Daniel Endelman; Tori Ross; Mark Ross; Salvatore Stabile
- Starring: Anthony Tucci; Tom Malloy; Thomas Bradise; Michael Parducci
- Edited by: Miranda Devin; Salvatore Stabile
- Music by: Bill Laswell
- Distributed by: Palm Pictures
- Release date: 1996 (Seattle International Film Festival)
- Running time: 85 Minutes
- Country: United States
- Language: English
- Budget: $65,000

Gravesend is a 1996 crime drama film written and directed by Salvatore Stabile in his directorial debut. Originally shot on a budget of $5,000, the story follows four young gangsters in Brooklyn on one Saturday night as they attempt to dispose of the body of a man they accidentally killed.

== Plot ==
After a quick narration by director Stabile, as well as a flash forward, the film's story gets underway by showing Zane, Mikey, Ray and Chicken spending a Saturday night in Ray's basement. Throughout the film, the backgrounds of the four young men are explored by Stabile via past exposition: Ray's parents died while he was young, and he had a very bitter and contentious relationship with his older brother and new guardian Mark. Zane grew up without a father, and had trouble staying in school before ultimately being kicked out of his mother's house due to his behavior. Chicken developed drug habits at an early age as a result of witnessing the murder of his older brother, and his mother abandoned him when he was 15. Mikey, who experienced his parents' miserable marriage firsthand, was the bullied outcast of the group and had tried to kill himself at least twice before this night.

Early into their night, the four get into an argument which wakes up Mark and leads to him getting into a fight with Zane. Zane takes a gun he thinks is unloaded and threatens Mark with it, but then he shoots the gun and kills him. Zane overrules the group's pleas to call the police about the accidental death and forces them to have the corpse be buried by his associate JoJo the Junkie. Ray and Zane become completely hostile to each other and split the group into warring factions.

After getting into a fight and avoiding getting their car towed away, the group convinces JoJo to help. JoJo, a local drug dealer with a history of violence and arrests, agrees to bury Mark's body for a payment of $500 and a severed thumb (implying that someone from the group will have to sacrifice a digit to him to complete the deal). The group spends the rest of the night doing various criminal acts in attempt to scrap up money, such as a failed drug deal and an armed robbery at a convenience store.

Eventually, the group goes to Mikey's home to borrow money from his father, where they find him having an affair with another woman. Getting into a heated argument, Mikey takes Zane's pistol and kills both his father and his side piece.

Finally, Mikey manages to borrow the money from his sister, who hates the group (especially Zane) for how badly they treat him but only manages to hurt Mikey by screaming that he's a loser who lets them dole out abuse. JoJo, however, refuses to bury all three bodies. Instead, the group leaves two of them at his basement and drives off with one in the trunk. They park the car near the beach, sleeping for the rest of the night. The next morning, Mikey leaves the group to jump off a bridge onto a freeway below, killing himself.

Zane shoots Ray, and Chicken shoots Zane while he attempts to dump Ray's body in the car. Chicken finally douses the car and the bodies in gasoline, setting it on fire; the fire sets off an explosion that kills him and officially wipes out the group of "friends". The film concludes with Stabile explaining that he moved out of Gravesend afterwards, and that the police investigation ended after a few months of questioning.

== Cast ==
- Anthony Tucci as Zane
- Tom Malloy as Chicken
- Thomas Bradise as Mikey
- Michael Parducci as Ray
- Sean Quinn as Mark
- Mackey Aquilino as JoJo the Junkie
- Carmel Altomare as Zane's Mother
- Teresa Spinelli as Zane's Grandmother
- Glen Sparer as Tow Truck Driver
- David Auerbach as Tony
- Mirada Devin as Mary
- Maurice Carr as Terrance
- Gregg Bello as the Cop
- Anne Rollins as Mikey'S Sister
- Armando J. Cerabino as Mikey's Father
- Kira Burke as the Father's Girlfriend
- Jinn S. Kim as the Store Clerk
- Frits Zernike as the Convenience Store Customer
- Gil Machucha as the Mexican Shop Owner

== Production ==
Gravesend initially started as a novel written by Salvatore Stabile at the age 15, with the characters partially inspired by close friends of his. Stabile, who later attended a film course at New York University, was inspired to turn the story into a movie after watching Kevin Smiths Clerks. Using $5,000 in inheritance he received from his grandmother's passing, filming for the feature began in 1994 and took about three years to complete, with only a 16mm camera utilized due to costs. Due to the tight budget, Stabile was only able to hire actors willing to perform for free. After gaining the attention of investors with the yet-to-be-finished material, Stabile was granted an addition $60,000 to use for post-production, and eventually Steven Spielberg and Oliver Stone convinced Manga Entertainment and Island Digital to distribute it after meeting Stabile.

== Release and reception ==
The film made its screen debut during the 1996 Seattle International Film Festival, and it later made its European debut at the London Film Festival. After acquiring the distribution deal, the film received another screening in New York on September 5, 1997, and later began screening in Los Angeles later that month. In 1998, the film was released on home video VHS and DVD formats through Palm Pictures.

=== Critical reception ===
On Rotten Tomatoes, it holds a score of 60% based on 10 critic reviews. Roger Ebert gave the film two out of four, concluding his review by stating that "there are flashes of life here, a feeling of immediacy in the camera style, a lot of energy--and promise. But it’s not yet the movie he’s probably capable of." Writing for The New York Times, Stephen Holden criticized the movie's plot and characters, ultimately dismissing it.

== Soundtrack ==
Music from the Motion Picture Gravesend

Soundtrack album by various artists
- Released: August 19, 1997
- Genre: Alternative rock; hip hop; rap metal
- Length: 53:34
- Label: Island Records
- Producer: Budd Carr (exec.); Chris Blackwell (exec.); Salvatore Stabile (exec.); Bill Laswell; Cake; DJ Muggs; Doug DeAngelis; Everlast; Kevin Bents; McLeer Bros.

Singles from Gravesend
- 1. "Gravesend (Lake of Fire)" Released: August 5, 1997

Professional ratings
Review scores
Source	Rating
AllMusic	3/5 stars

A soundtrack album, Music From the Original Motion Picture Gravesend, was released on August 19, 1997 through Island Records. It combines the Bill Laswell-composed score with excerpts from the film and songs contributed by several artists, such as Lordz of Brooklyn, Local H, Everlast, Cake, Call O' Da Wild, Cypress Hill and Jake. A single and a music video was produced for Lordz of Brooklyn's "Gravesend (Lake of Fire)" featuring clips from the film.

=== Track listing ===
No.	Title	Writer(s)	Producer(s)	Length
1.	"Not Another Saturday Night"			0:04
2.	"Saturday Night Fever (Part 2)" (performed by Lordz of Brooklyn)	Adam McLeer; Michael McLeer; Scott Westerman	Admoney; Mr. Kaves	3:16
3.	"Joe Joe's Place"			0:27
4.	"Ninth Symphony" (performed by Call O' Da Wild and Cypress Hill)	Angelo Campanioni; Barron Ricks; Louis Freese; Lawrence Muggerud	DJ Muggs	3:45
5.	"And a Thumb"			0:17
6.	"Gravesend (Lake of Fire)" (performed by Lordz of Brooklyn)	A. McLeer; M. McLeer; Westerman; Erik Schrody; Curt Kirkwood	Admoney; Doug DeAngelis (co.)	4:34
7.	"And Three Thumbs"			0:17
8.	"Have Yourself a Merry Little Christmas" (performed by Local H)	Ralph Blane; Hugh Martin		2:33
9.	"Stupid"			0:15
10.	"Kingdom Come" (performed by Lordz of Brooklyn)	A. McLeer; M. McLeer; Westerman; Paulie Nugent; Babalou	Admoney; Doug DeAngelis	4:23
11.	"Pussy"			0:26
12.	"Some Nights (Are Better than Others)" (performed by Everlast)	Schrody	Everlast; Divine Styler (co.)	2:49
13.	"Mary (the Slut)"			0:56
14.	"Tag Along" (performed by Local H)	Scott Lucas; Joe Daniels		2:49
15.	"Mother"			0:22
16.	"Multiply the Heartaches" (performed by Cake)	Kathleen Dearth	Cake	2:47
17.	"Brooklyn Lullaby" (performed by Lordz of Brooklyn)	A. McLeer; M. McLeer; Westerman	Admoney; Doug DeAngelis (co.)	4:51
18.	"Heaven" (performed by Jake)	Jessie Lee Montague	Kevin Bents	4:13
19.	"The Abyss" (performed by Bill Laswell)	Bill Laswell	Bill Laswell	1:31
20.	"Gravesend Theme" (performed by Bill Laswell)	Laswell	Bill Laswell	2:09
21.	"Sleepless Nights" (performed by Bill Laswell)	Laswell	Bill Laswell	1:43
22.	"El Mariachi Loco" (performed by Bill Laswell)	Laswell	Bill Laswell	1:53
23.	"Gravesend Prelude" (performed by Bill Laswell)	Laswell	Bill Laswell	1:09
24.	"Gravesend Symphony" (performed by Bill Laswell)	Laswell	Bill Laswell	0:46
25.	"Arch Angels" (performed by Bill Laswell)	Laswell	Bill Laswell	1:53
26.	"Gravesend Theme" (performed by Bill Laswell)	Laswell	Bill Laswell	3:26
Total length:				53:34
