= Maria Ekerhovd =

Norwegian film producer (born 1975)

- Born: 1975 (age 50–51); Bergen, Norway
- Education: Norwegian University of Science and Technology
- Occupation: Film producer
- Years active: 1999–present
- Children: 2

Maria Ekerhovd (born 1975) is a Norwegian film producer. Her credits include Eskil Vogt's The Innocents (2021), Gunnar Vikene's War Sailor (2022), and Joachim Trier's Sentimental Value (2025), the latter of which won the Academy Award for Best International Feature Film at the 98th Academy Awards.

== Early life ==
Ekerhovd was born in Bergen and grew up in Fyllingsdalen and Bønes. Her mother is a psychologist. She was not accepted into any film schools, instead graduating from the Norwegian University of Science and Technology with a bachelor's degree in film and video production.

== Career ==
Ekerhovd's first job in film was as a clapper loader as she did not have a driver's license and, therefore, could not be a production assistant. She later became a producer, production manager, and first assistant director on short films. In 2011, she founded the production company Mer Film and was named a Producer on the Move by Screen Daily.

At the 34th European Film Awards in 2021, she won the Eurimages Co-Production Award. She later served on the jury of the Berlinale Co-Production Market at the 72nd Berlin International Film Festival and the Shooting Stars Award jury for European Film Promotion. In 2025, she was named one of the 46 Most Influential Women in International Film by The Hollywood Reporter.

== Personal life ==
Ekerhovd lives in Møhlenpris with her husband and two children.

== Filmography ==
=== Film ===
Year	Title	Director	Notes	Ref.
2006	Sniffer	Bobbie Peers	Short film; producer	
2009	The Storm in My Heart	Pål Jackman	Producer	
2009	Vegas	Gunnar Vikene	Producer	
2013	I Am Yours	Iram Haq	Producer	
2014	Cathedrals Of Culture	Various	Co-producer; segment: "The Oslo Opera House"	
2014	Out of Nature	Ole Giæver, Marte Vold	Producer	
2014	Here Is Harold	Gunnar Vikene	Producer	
2015	Hedi Schneider Is Stuck	Sonja Heiss	Co-producer	
2015	Every Thing Will Be Fine	Wim Wenders	Co-producer	
2015	The Disappearing Illusionist	Bobbie Peers	Producer	
2016	The Untamed	Amat Escalante	Co-producer	
2017	From the Balcony	Ole Giæver	Producer	
2017	Bright Nights	Thomas Arslan	Co-producer	
2017	Hoggeren	Jorunn Myklebust Syversen	Producer	
2017	What Will People Say	Iram Haq	Producer	
2017	Letters	Marte Vold, Jéro Yun	Producer	
2019	Divine Love	Gabriel Mascaro	Co-producer	
2019	Disco	Jorunn Myklebust Syversen	Producer	
2019	Exit Plan	Jonas Alexander Arnby	Co-producer	
2021	Gritt	Itonje Søimer Guttormsen	Producer	
2021	Flee	Jonas Poher Rasmussen	Co-producer	
2021	The Innocents	Eskil Vogt	Producer	
2022	12 Dares	Izer Aliu	Producer	
2022	More Than Ever	Emily Atef	Co-producer	
2022	War Sailor	Gunnar Vikene	Producer	
2022	Memory of Water	Saara Saarela	Co-producer	
2023	Let the River Flow	Ole Giæver	Producer	
2023	A Stork's Journey 2	Benjamin Quabeck, Mette Tange	Co-producer	
2023	The Gullspång Miracle	Maria Fredriksson	Co-producer	
2023	Kalak	Isabella Eklöf	Co-producer	
2025	The Ugly Stepsister	Emilie Blichfeldt	Producer	
2025	Stranger	Mads Hedegaard	Co-producer	
2025	Sentimental Value	Joachim Trier	Producer	
2026	Butterfly	Itonje Søimer Guttormsen	Producer	

=== Television ===
Year	Title	Network	Notes	Ref.
2026	A Sámi Wedding	NRK, Yle	Producer	

== Awards and nominations ==
Award	Year	Category	Nominated work	Result	Ref.
Academy Awards	2026	Best Picture	Sentimental Value	Nominated	
Amanda Awards	2009	Best Film	The Storm in My Heart	Nominated	
Amanda Awards	2010	Best Film	Vegas	Nominated	
Amanda Awards	2015	Best Film	Out of Nature	Nominated	
Amanda Awards	2018	Best Film	What Will People Say	Nominated	
Amanda Awards	2022	Best Film	The Innocents	Nominated	
Amanda Awards	2023	Best Film	Let the River Flow	Nominated	
British Academy Film Awards	2026	Best Film	Sentimental Value	Nominated	
British Academy Film Awards	2026	Best Film Not in the English Language	Sentimental Value	Won	
British Independent Film Awards	2025	Best International Independent Film	Sentimental Value	Won	
European Film Awards	2026	Best Film	Sentimental Value	Won	
Producers Guild of America Awards	2026	Best Theatrical Motion Picture	Sentimental Value	Nominated	
