= List of Malawian films =

List of films produced in Malawi

List of Malawian films includes feature films, short films, and documentaries produced wholly or partly in Malawi. Malawi’s film industry has grown significantly since the 2000s, with notable productions earning international recognition and awards at African and global film festivals.

== Notable films ==
- Seasons of a Life (2009), directed by Charles Shemu Joyah; won awards at the African Movie Academy Awards.
- The Last Fishing Boat (2012), directed by Shemu Joyah; nominated for Best Film at the Africa Movie Academy Awards.
- The Road to Sunrise (2017), directed by Shemu Joyah; Malawi’s submission for Best International Feature Film at the 2019 Oscars.
- Fatsani: A Tale of Survival (2021), produced by HD Plus Creations; gained wide acclaim across Africa and featured at several festivals.
- All We Have Is Us (2023), a romantic drama directed by Charles Shemu Joyah under Joyah Films.
- The Boy Who Harnessed the Wind (2019) – directed by Chiwetel Ejiofor and based on the true story of William Kamkwamba; filmed partly in Malawi and distributed by Netflix.
- 4Kaya Films (studio production list includes short films such as Winds of Karonga and Return to Nkhamanga).

== See also ==
- List of African films
- 4Kaya Films
