= List of submissions to the 91st Academy Awards for Best Foreign Language Film =

2018 Best Foreign Language Film submissions
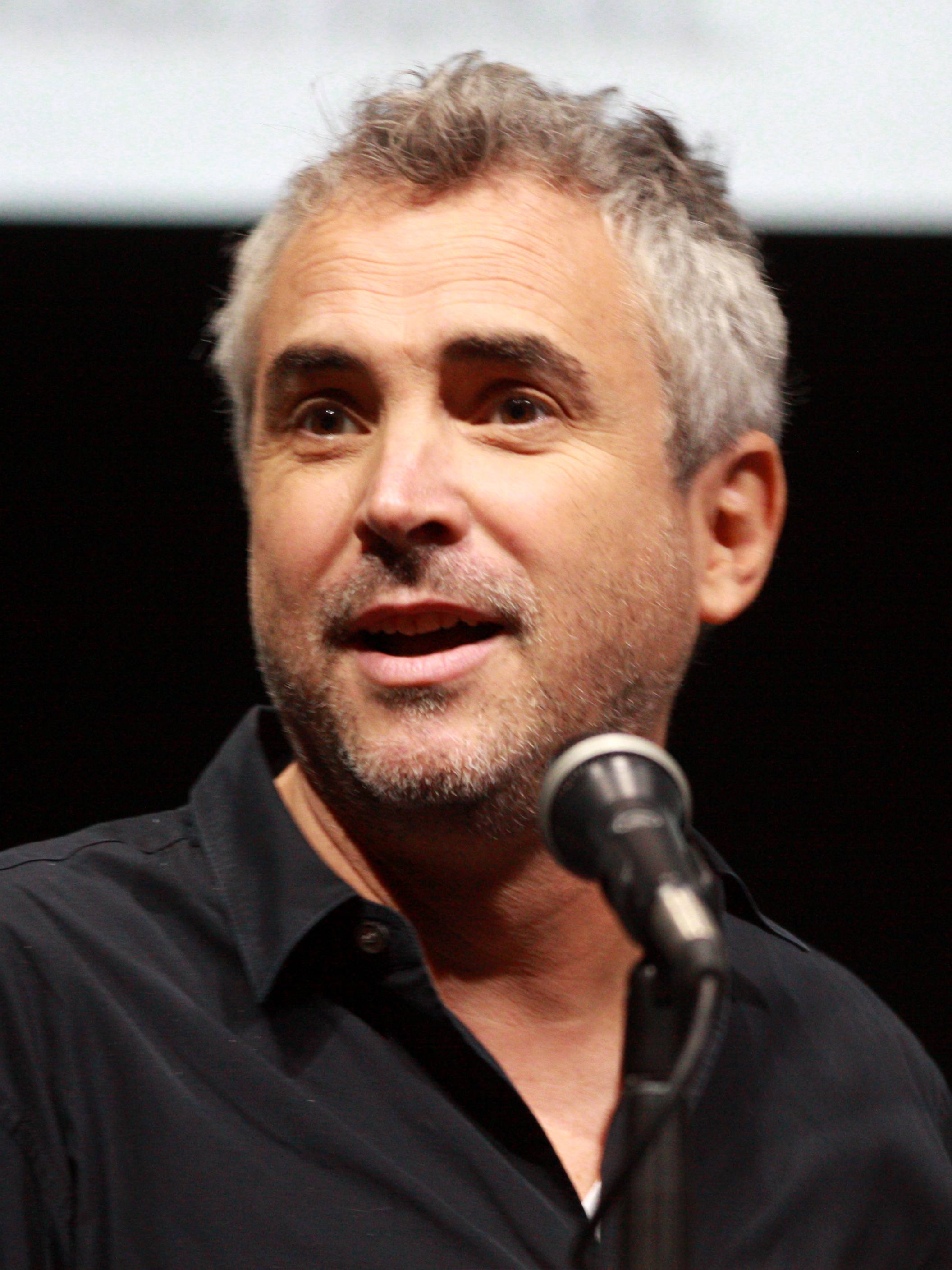
- Alfonso Cuarón directed Roma, which won the year's award.

Highlights
- Oscar winner: (Mexico) Roma
- Submissions: 89
- Debuts: 2
- Total eligible: 87

This is a list of submissions to the 91st Academy Awards for the Best Foreign Language Film. The Academy of Motion Picture Arts and Sciences (AMPAS) has invited the film industries of various countries to submit their best film for the Academy Award for Best Foreign Language Film every year since the award was created in 1956. The award is presented annually by the Academy to a feature-length motion picture produced outside the United States that contains primarily non-English dialogue. The Foreign Language Film Award Committee oversees the process and reviews all the submitted films.

For the 91st Academy Awards, the submitted motion pictures must have first been released theatrically in their respective countries between 1 October 2017 and 30 September 2018. The deadline for submissions to the Academy was 1 October 2018. 89 countries submitted films, and 87 were found to be eligible by AMPAS and screened for voters. Malawi and Niger submitted films for the first time, while Belarus made a submission for the first time since 1996. After the 9-film shortlist was announced on 17 December 2018, the five nominees were announced on 22 January 2019.

Mexico won the award for the first time with Roma by Alfonso Cuarón, which also won Best Cinematography and Best Director, and was also nominated for Best Picture, Best Actress (Yalitza Aparicio), Best Supporting Actress (Marina de Tavira), Best Original Screenplay, Best Production Design, Best Sound Editing and Best Sound Mixing.

== Submissions ==
Submitting country	Film title used in nomination	Original title	Language(s)	Director(s)	Result
Afghanistan	Rona, Azim's Mother	رونا مادر عظیم	Persian, Dari	Jamshid Mahmoudi	Not nominated
Algeria	Until the End of Time	إلى آخر الزمان / Jusqu'à la fin des temps	Arabic	Yasmine Chouikh	Not nominated
Argentina	El ángel		Spanish	Luis Ortega	Not nominated
Armenia	Spitak	Սպիտակ	Armenian, Russian, French	Alexander Kott	Not nominated
Australia	Jirga	جرګه	Pashto, English	Benjamin Gilmour	Not nominated
Austria	The Waldheim Waltz	Waldheims Walzer	German, English, French	Ruth Beckermann	Not nominated
Bangladesh	No Bed of Roses	ডুব	Bengali, English	Mostofa Sarwar Farooki	Not nominated
Belarus	Crystal Swan	Хрусталь	Russian, English, Belarusian	Darya Zhuk	Not nominated
Belgium	Girl		Flemish, Dutch, French, English	Lukas Dhont	Not nominated
Bolivia	The Goalkeeper	Muralla	Spanish	Gory Patiño	Not nominated
Bosnia and Herzegovina	Never Leave Me	Ne ostavljaj me	Arabic, Turkish	Aida Begić	Not nominated
Brazil	The Great Mystical Circus	O Grande Circo Místico	Brazilian Portuguese	Cacá Diegues	Not nominated
Bulgaria	Omnipresent	Вездесъщият	Bulgarian	Ilian Djevelekov	Not nominated
Cambodia	Graves Without a Name	Les tombeaux sans noms / ផ្នូរគ្មានឈ្មោះ	French, Khmer	Rithy Panh	Not nominated
Canada	Family First	Chien de garde	French	Sophie Dupuis	Not nominated
Chile	And Suddenly the Dawn	Y de pronto el amanecer	Spanish	Silvio Caiozzi	Not nominated
China	Hidden Man	邪不压正	Mandarin, English, French, Japanese	Jiang Wen	Not nominated
Colombia	Birds of Passage	Pájaros de verano	Wayuu, Spanish, English, Wiwa	Cristina Gallego and Ciro Guerra	Made shortlist
Costa Rica	Medea		Spanish	Alexandra Latishev Salazar	Not nominated
Croatia	The Eighth Commissioner	Osmi povjerenik	Croatian, Bosnian, English	Ivan Salaj	Not nominated
Cuba	Sergio and Sergei	Sergio & Sergei	Spanish, English, Russian	Ernesto Daranas	Not on the final list
Czech Republic	Winter Flies	Všechno bude	Czech	Olmo Omerzu	Not nominated
Denmark	The Guilty	Den skyldige	Danish	Gustav Möller	Made shortlist
Dominican Republic	Cocote		Spanish	Nelson Carlo de los Santos Arias	Not nominated
Ecuador	A Son of Man	A Son of Man: La maldición del tesoro de Atahualpa	Spanish, English, German, Kichwa	Luis Felipe Fernández-Salvador y Campodónico	Not nominated
Egypt	Yomeddine	يوم الدين	Arabic	Abu Bakr Shawky	Not nominated
Estonia	Take It or Leave It	Võta või jäta	Estonian, Finnish	Liina Triškina-Vanhatalo	Not nominated
Finland	Euthanizer	Armomurhaaja	Finnish	Teemu Nikki	Not nominated
France	Memoir of War	La douleur	French, Yiddish	Emmanuel Finkiel	Not nominated
Georgia	Namme	ნამე	Georgian	Zaza Khalvashi	Not nominated
Germany	Never Look Away	Werk ohne Autor	German, Russian	Florian Henckel von Donnersmarck	Nominated
Greece	Polyxeni	Πολυξένη	Greek, Turkish	Dora Masklavanou	Not nominated
Hong Kong	Operation Red Sea	红海行动	Mandarin, English, Arabic	Dante Lam	Not nominated
Hungary	Sunset	Napszállta	Hungarian, German	László Nemes	Not nominated
Iceland	Woman at War	Kona fer í stríð	Icelandic, Spanish, English, Ukrainian	Benedikt Erlingsson	Not nominated
India	Village Rockstars	ভিলেজ ৰকষ্টাৰ্ছ	Kamrupi Assamese	Rima Das	Not nominated
Indonesia	Marlina the Murderer in Four Acts	Marlina Si Pembunuh dalam Empat Babak	Kambera	Mouly Surya	Not nominated
Iran	No Date, No Signature	بدون تاریخ، بدون امضا	Persian	Vahid Jalilvand	Not nominated
Iraq	The Journey	الرحلة	Arabic, English	Mohamed al-Daradji	Not nominated
Israel	The Cakemaker	האופה מברלין	Hebrew, English, German	Ofir Raul Graizer	Not nominated
Italy	Dogman		Italian	Matteo Garrone	Not nominated
Japan	Shoplifters	万引き家族	Japanese	Hirokazu Kore-eda	Nominated
Kazakhstan	Ayka	Айка	Kyrgyz, Russian	Sergey Dvortsevoy	Made shortlist
Kenya	Supa Modo		Swahili, Kikuyu, English, Sheng	Likarion Wainaina	Not nominated
Kosovo	The Marriage	Martesa	Albanian	Blerta Zeqiri	Not nominated
Kyrgyzstan	Night Accident	Түнкү кырсык / Ночная авария	Kyrgyz	Temirbek Birnazarov	Not on the final list
Latvia	To Be Continued	Turpinājums	Latvian, Russian	Ivars Seleckis	Not nominated
Lebanon	Capernaum	کفرناحوم	Arabic, Amharic	Nadine Labaki	Nominated
Lithuania	Wonderful Losers: A Different World	Nuostabieji lūzeriai. Kita planeta	Italian, English, Dutch	Arūnas Matelis	Not nominated
Luxembourg	Gutland		Luxembourgish, German	Govinda Van Maele	Not nominated
(North Macedonia) Macedonia	Secret Ingredient	Исцелител	Macedonian	Gjorce Stavreski	Not nominated
Malawi	The Road to Sunrise		Chewa, English	Shemu Joyah	Not nominated
Mexico	Roma		Spanish, Nuyoo Mixtec, English, Japanese, German, French, Norwegian	Alfonso Cuarón	Won Academy Award
Montenegro	Iskra		Serbian	Gojko Berkuljan	Not nominated
Morocco	Burnout	بورن أوت	Arabic, French	Nour-Eddine Lakhmari	Not nominated
Nepal	Panchayat	पंचायत	Nepali	Shivam Adhikari	Not nominated
Netherlands	The Resistance Banker	Bankier van het Verzet	Dutch, German	Joram Lürsen	Not nominated
New Zealand	Yellow Is Forbidden		Mandarin, English, French	Pietra Brettkelly	Not nominated
Niger	The Wedding Ring	Zin'naariya!	Zarma, Songhoyboro Ciine, Hausa, Central-Eastern Niger Fulfulde, Bambara, Mooré	Rahmatou Keïta	Not nominated
Norway	What Will People Say	Hva vil folk si	Norwegian, Urdu	Iram Haq	Not nominated
Pakistan	Cake	کیک	Urdu, Sindhi	Asim Abbasi	Not nominated
Palestine	Ghost Hunting	إصطياد اشباح	Arabic, Hebrew, English	Raed Andoni	Not nominated
Panama	Ruben Blades Is Not My Name	Yo no me llamo Rubén Blades	Spanish, English	Abner Benaim	Not nominated
Paraguay	The Heiresses	Las herederas	Spanish, Guarani	Marcelo Martinessi	Not nominated
Peru	Eternity	Wiñaypacha	Aymara	Óscar Catacora	Not nominated
Philippines	Signal Rock		Filipino	Chito S. Roño	Not nominated
Poland	Cold War	Zimna wojna	Polish, French, Croatian, German, Russian, Serbian, Italian	Paweł Pawlikowski	Nominated
Portugal	Pilgrimage	Peregrinação	Portuguese, Japanese, Mandarin, Latin, Indonesian	João Botelho	Not nominated
Romania	I Do Not Care If We Go Down in History as Barbarians	Îmi este indiferent dacă în istorie vom intra ca barbari	Romanian, French, Spanish, English, German	Radu Jude	Not nominated
Russia	Sobibor	Собибор	Russian, German, Dutch, Polish, Yiddish	Konstantin Khabensky	Not nominated
Serbia	Offenders	Изгредници	Serbian	Dejan Zečević	Not nominated
Singapore	Buffalo Boys		Indonesian, English	Mike Wiluan	Not nominated
Slovakia	The Interpreter	Tlmočník	Slovak, Czech, German, Russian, English	Martin Šulík	Not nominated
Slovenia	Ivan		Slovene, Italian	Janez Burger	Not nominated
South Africa	Sew the Winter to My Skin		Afrikaans, Xhosa, English	Jahmil X. T. Qubeka	Not nominated
South Korea	Burning	버닝	Korean, English	Lee Chang-dong	Made shortlist
Spain	Champions	Campeones	Spanish	Javier Fesser	Not nominated
Sweden	Border	Gräns	Swedish, English	Ali Abbasi	Not nominated
Switzerland	Eldorado		German, French, Italian, Northern Kurdish, Swiss German, Arabic, Amharic	Markus Imhoof	Not nominated
Taiwan	The Great Buddha+	大佛普拉斯	Taiwanese Hokkien, Mandarin, English	Huang Hsin-yao	Not nominated
Thailand	Malila: The Farewell Flower	มะลิลา	Thai	Anucha Boonyawatana	Not nominated
Tunisia	Beauty and the Dogs	على كف عفريت / La belle et la meute	Arabic	Kaouther Ben Hania	Not nominated
Turkey	The Wild Pear Tree	Ahlat Ağacı	Turkish	Nuri Bilge Ceylan	Not nominated
Ukraine	Donbass	Донбас / Донбасс	Russian, Ukrainian	Sergei Loznitsa	Not nominated
United Kingdom	I Am Not a Witch		Bemba, English, Nyanja, Tonga	Rungano Nyoni	Not nominated
Uruguay	A Twelve-Year Night	La noche de 12 años	Spanish	Álvaro Brechner	Not nominated
Venezuela	The Family	La familia	Spanish	Gustavo Rondón Córdova	Not nominated
Vietnam	The Tailor	Cô Ba Sài Gòn	Vietnamese	Trần Bửu Lộc and Nguyễn Lê Phương Khanh	Not nominated
Yemen	10 Days Before the Wedding	10 أيام قبل الزفة	Arabic	Amr Gamal	Not nominated

== Notes ==
- Honduras were scheduled to announce their film on 21 September 2018. However, they did not submit a film.
- Kenya's government was initially sued by director Wanuri Kahiu, whose film Rafiki was denied a release from the Kenya Film Classification Board for its "clear intent to promote lesbianism in Kenya." Kahiu sued so the film will be eligible as Kenya's submission for Best Foreign Language Film. On 21 September 2018, the Kenyan High Court lifted the ban on the film, allowing it to be screened in the country for seven days, therefore meeting the eligibility requirements. Despite the ban being lifted, it was not selected as Kenya's submission in the Foreign Language Film category, with Supa Modo by Likarion Wainaina being sent instead.
- Puerto Rico had asked AMPAS to reconsider its position on allowing submissions from territories and protectorates of the United States. Puerto Rico last submitted a film for the Best Foreign Language Film in 2010, and has been ineligible since.
