= Births in 2001 =

Notable people born in the year 2001

The following is a list of notable births in 2001. For the full list, see Category:2001 births.

== January–April ==
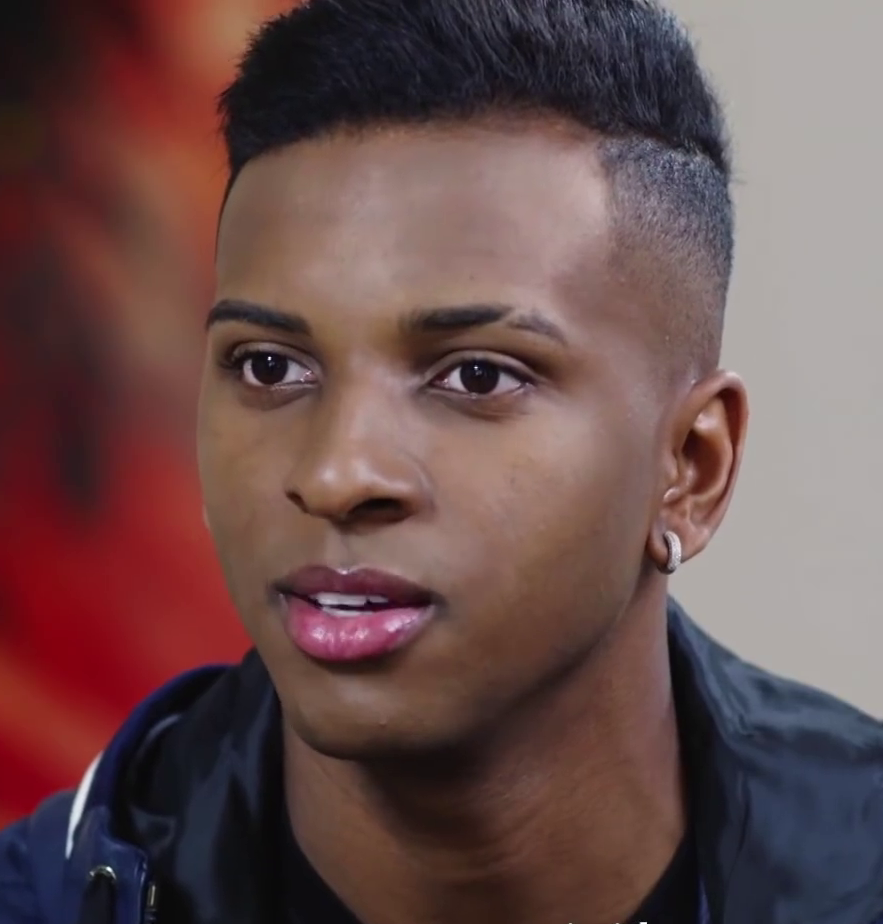
Rodrygo

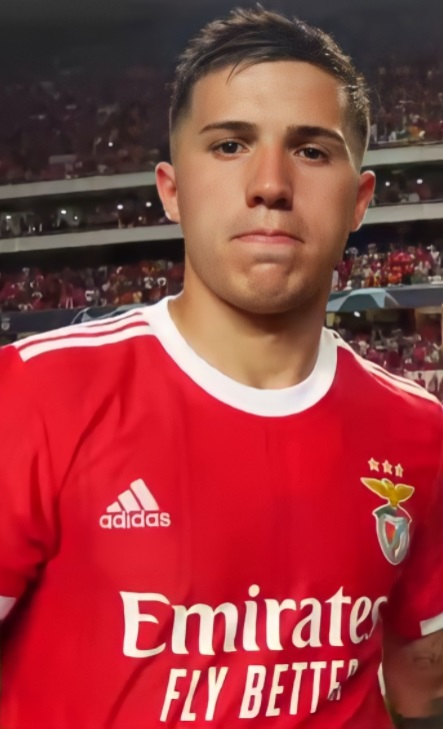
Enzo Fernández

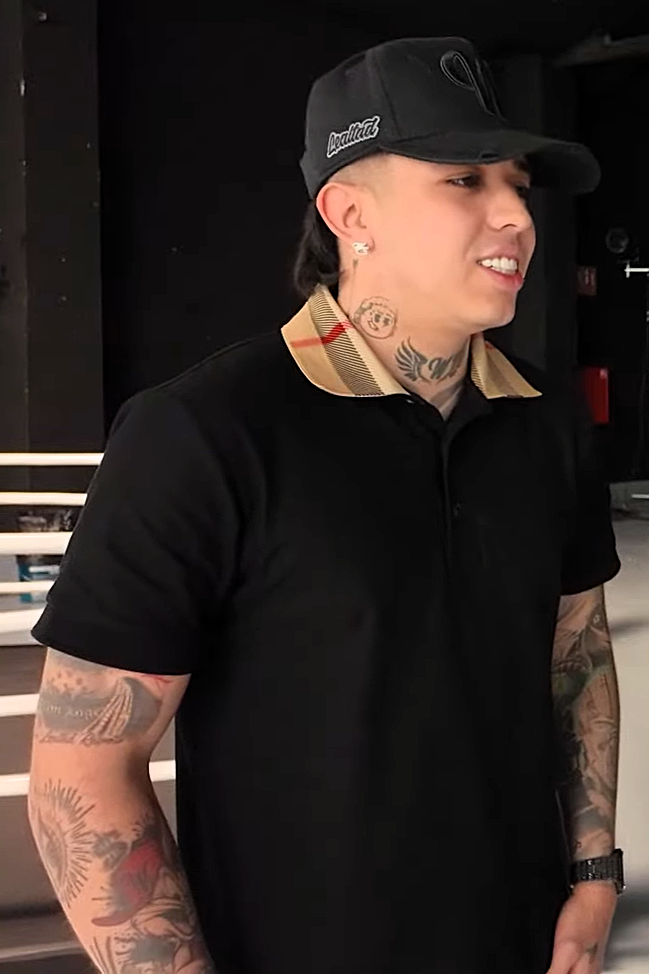
Westcol

Inde Navarrette

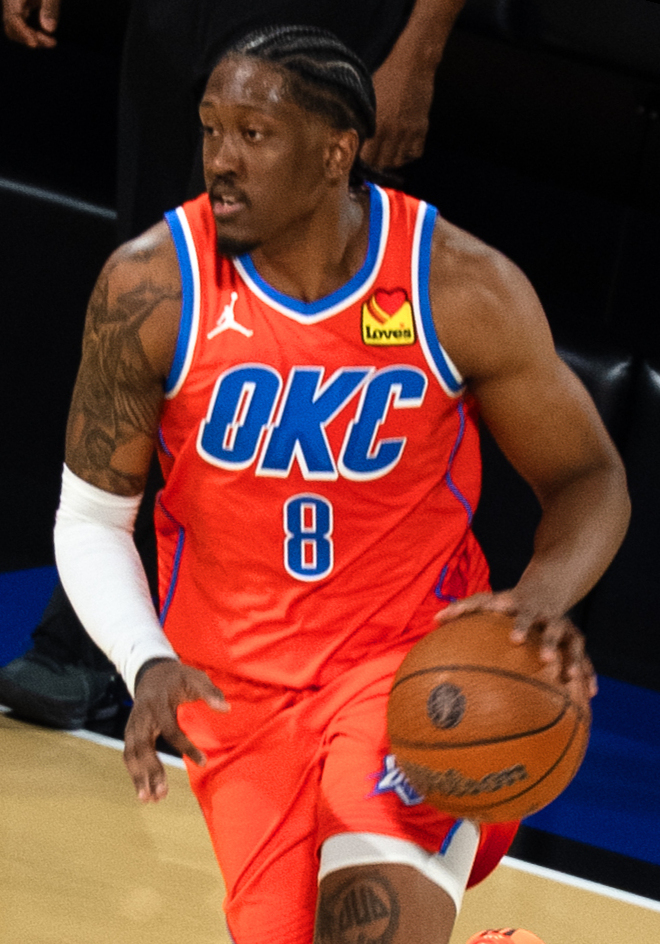
Jalen Williams

- January 1
  - Angourie Rice, Australian actress
  - Winter, South Korean singer & dancer
  - Ersin Destanoğlu, Turkish goalkeeper
- January 3
  - Adam Aleksic, American linguist and content creator
  - Deni Avdija, Israeli basketball player
- January 4 – Lola Young, English singer-songwriter and multi-instrumentalist
- January 5 – Mykhailo Mudryk, Ukrainian footballer
- January 9
  - Eric García, Spanish footballer
  - Rodrygo, Brazilian footballer
- January 15
  - Alexandra Agiurgiuculese, Romanian-Italian rhythmic gymnast
  - Charline Schwarz, German archer
- January 17 – Enzo Fernández, Argentine footballer
- January 24 – Leevi Aaltonen, Finnish ice hockey player
- January 25 – Michela Pace, Maltese singer
- January 29 – Melania Rodríguez, Spanish trampolinist
- February 2 – Westcol, Colombian online streamer
  - Louis Rees-Zammit, Welsh rugby union player
- February 12 – Khvicha Kvaratskhelia, Georgian footballer
- February 13 – Kaapo Kakko, Finnish ice hockey player
- February 23 – Rinky Hijikata, Australian tennis player
- February 19 – David Mazouz, American actor
- February 24
  - Ramona Marquez, British actress
  - An San, South Korean archer
- March 4 – Freya Anderson, English freestyle swimmer
- March 3 – Inde Navarrette, American actress
- March 6 – Milo Manheim, American actor
- March 8 – Gerry Abadiano, Filipino basketball player
- March 12 – Anna Zak, Russian-born Israeli singer, model, and actress
- March 21 – Varvara Subbotina, Russian synchronised swimmer
- March 25 – Aarne (Mircea Păpușoi), Russian-Moldavian music producer
- April 4 – Anzor Alem, Congolese actor and singer
- April 6 – Oscar Piastri, Australian racing driver
- April 10 – Noa Kirel, Israeli singer
- April 14 – Jalen Williams American Basketball Player
- April 21 – Lea Myren, Norwegian actress and fashion model
- April 19 - Emily Jade, English YouTuber
- April 26 – Thiago Almada, Argentine footballer
- April 27 – Akira Morishita, Filipino actor and singer (BGYO)
- April 29 – JJ, Austrian singer

== May–August ==
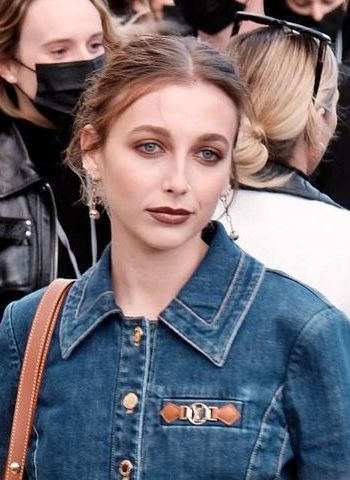
Emma Chamberlain

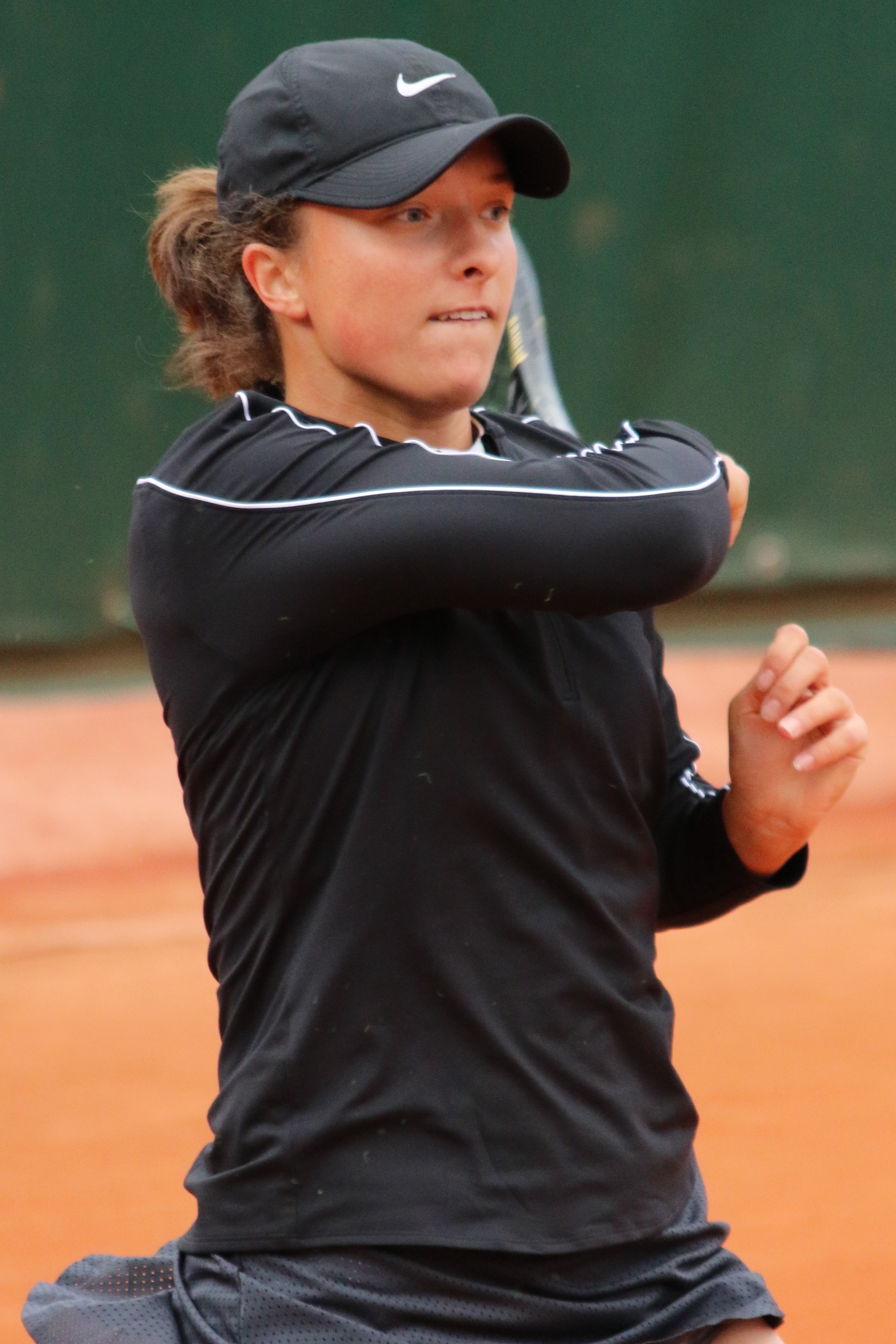
Iga Świątek

- May 3 – Rachel Zegler, American actress and singer
- May 8 – Jordyn Huitema, Canadian soccer player
- May 22 – Emma Chamberlain, American YouTuber
- May 24 – Kye A'Hern, Australian mountain bike racer
- May 29 – Maryna Aleksiyiva, Ukrainian synchronised swimmer
- May 31 – Iga Świątek, Polish tennis player
- June 4
  - Jacob Krop, Kenyan middle-distance runner
  - Takefusa Kubo, Japanese footballer
- June 12 – Théo Maledon, French basketball player
- July 10 – Isabela Moner, American actress and singer
- August 12 – Dixie D'Amelio, American social media personality
- August 16 – Jannik Sinner, Italian tennis player
- August 21 – Luinder Avila, Venezuelan baseball player
- August 22 – LaMelo Ball, American basketball player
- August 31 – Yael Shelbia, Israeli model and actress

August 31st Corey Maison Transgender Influencer

== September–December ==
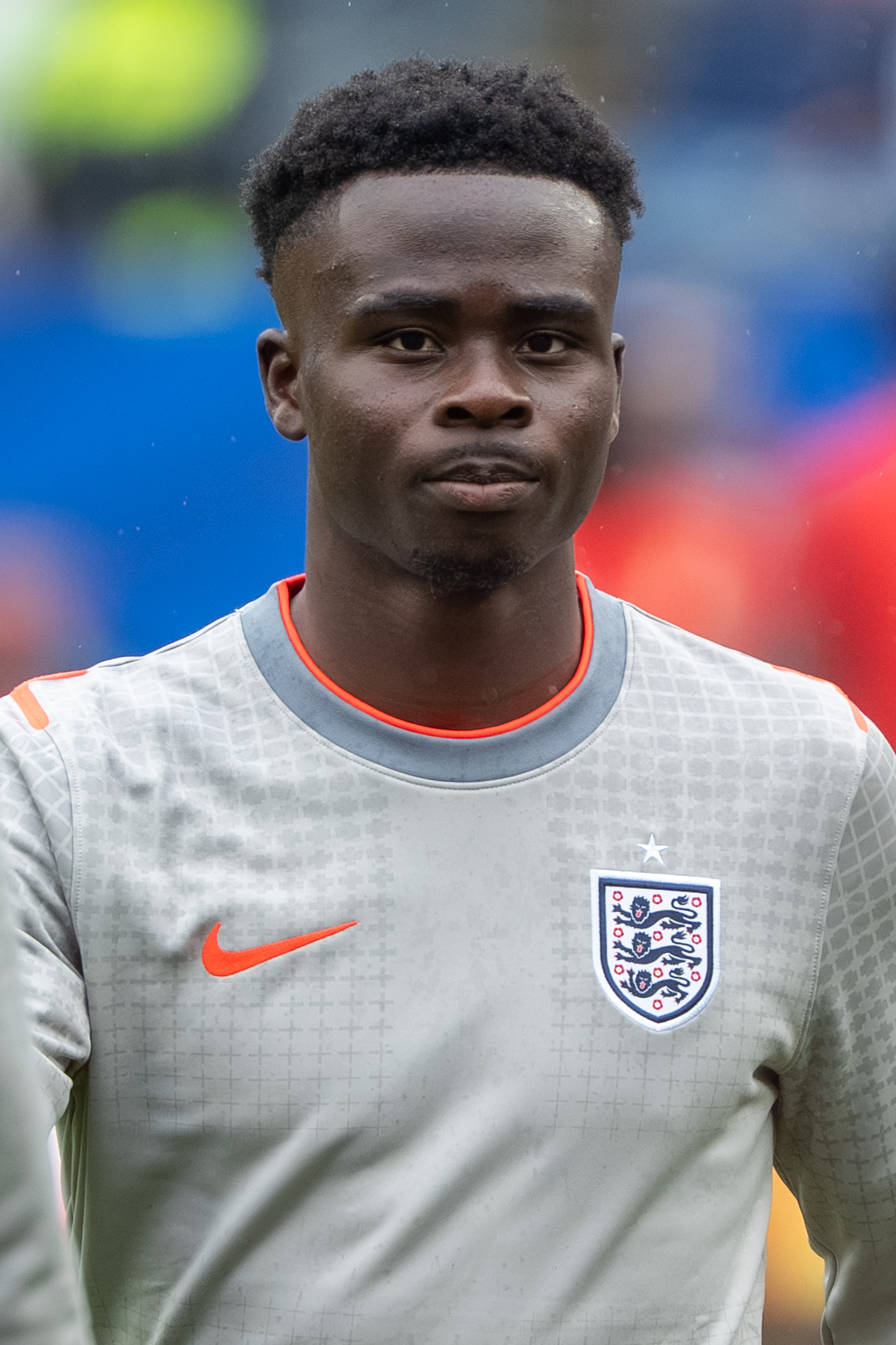
Bukayo Saka

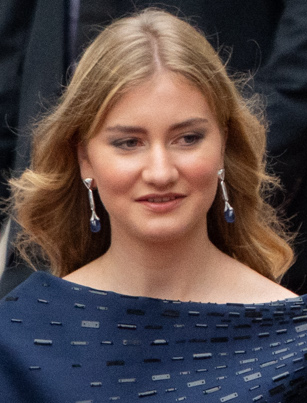
Princess Elisabeth, Duchess of Brabant

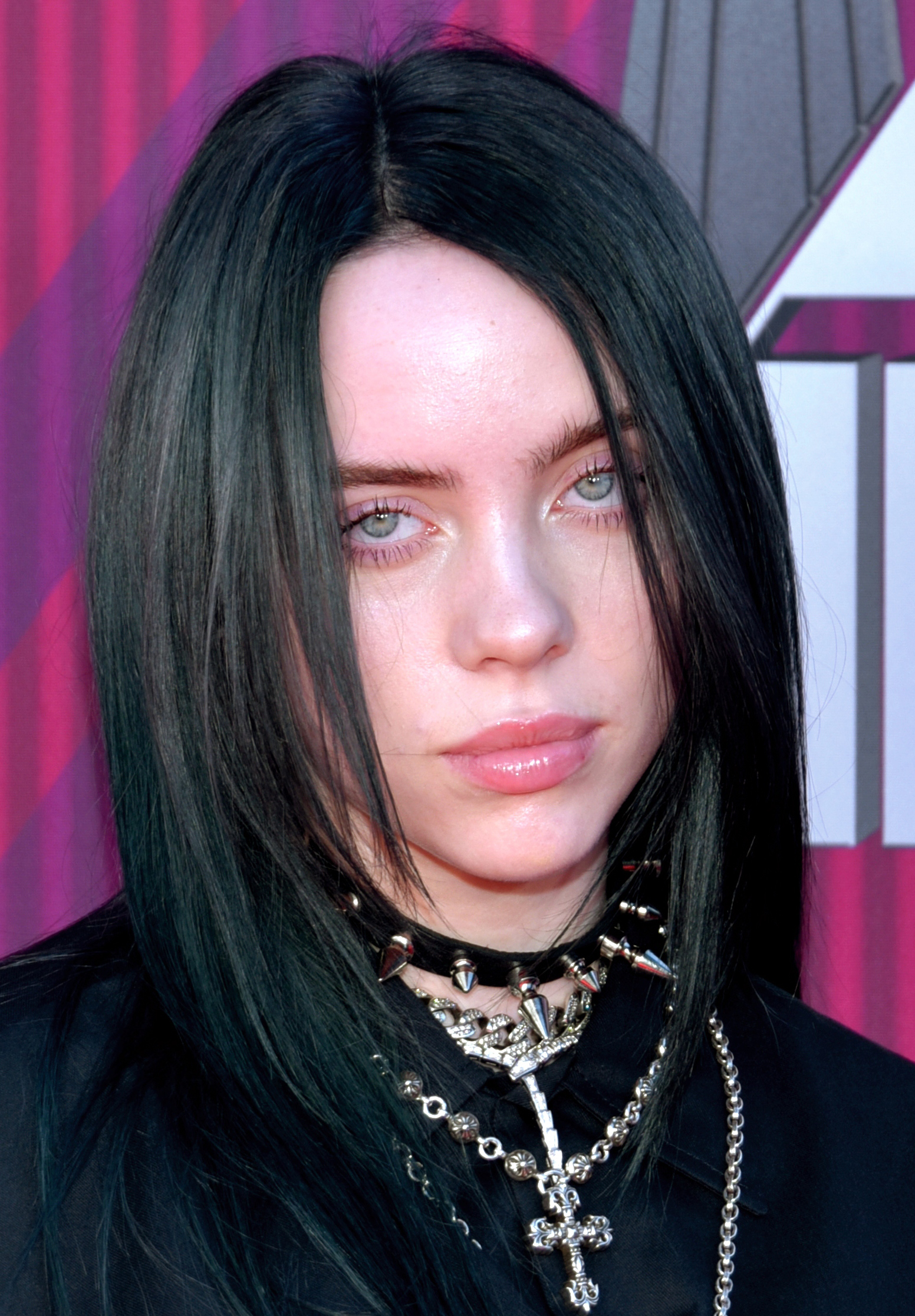
Billie Eilish

- September 1 – Andrew Morris, American baseball pitcher for the Minnesota Twins
- September 2 – Ella Rubin, American actress
- September 3 – Kaia Gerber, American model and actress
- September 5 – Bukayo Saka, English footballer
- September 6 – Freya Allan, English actress
- September 7 – Kain Adom, English footballer
- September 14 – Elena Mikhaylichenko, Russian handball player
- September 18 – Dia Maté, Filipina singer and beauty pageant
- September 20 – Johnny Cardoso, American professional soccer player
- September 25 – Cade Cunningham, American basketball player
- October 1 – Mason Greenwood, English footballer
- October 3 – Liel Abada, Israeli association footballer
- October 4 – Graham Campbell, American actor
- October 7 – Princess Senate Seeiso, princess of Lesotho
- October 12 – Brett Cooper, American actress and commentator
- October 13 – Caleb McLaughlin, American actor
- October 14 – Rowan Blanchard, American actress
- October 20 – Fina Girard, Swiss politician and youth climate activist
- October 22 – Stephen Gosnell, American football player
- October 25 – Princess Elisabeth, Duchess of Brabant, daughter and Heiress Apparent of Philippe, King of the Belgians
- November 8 – Avani Lekhara, Indian Paralympian and rifle shooter
- November 13 – Vidalia Abarca, Mexican footballer
- December 1 – Aiko, Princess Toshi of Japan
- December 1 – Oscar Chelimo, Ugandan long-distance runner
- December 1 – Casey Likes, American actor
- December 12 – Britain Dalton, American actor
- December 18 – Billie Eilish, American singer-songwriter
- December 28 – Maitreyi Ramakrishnan, Canadian actress
