= The Last Fishing Boat =

2013 Malawian drama film by Shemu Joyah

- Directed by: Shemu Joyah
- Screenplay by: Shemu Joyah
- Produced by: Shemu Joyah
- Starring: Hope Chisanu; Flora Suya
- Cinematography: Peter Mazunda
- Production company: First Dawn Arts
- Release date: April 2012
- Running time: 110 minutes
- Country: Malawi
- Language: English

The Last Fishing Boat is a 2012 Malawian drama film written, directed and produced by Shemu Joyah. The film stars Hope Chisanu, Flora Suya, Robert Loughlin in the lead roles. The plot of the film is based on the cultural differences between traditional African values and modernisation. The film won the Best Soundtrack Award at the 9th Africa Movie Academy Awards. The film was screened at the 2014 New African Films Festival.

== Synopsis ==
Once a successful fisherman (Hope Chisanu) at present find himself into extreme difficulties while his cultural aspects and values are being threatened by the rapid expansion of the tourism sector in Malawi. Things change upside down as his son (Robert Kalua) in contrast has become a tourist guide. In addition to this frustration, his third wife (Flora Suya) breaches the loyalty by engaging in sexual relationship with another man called Richard (Robert Loughlin) who is a white tourist. Richard is ready to pay large sums of money to her in order to sleep with her in the bed.

== Cast ==
- Hope Chisanu as fisherman
- Robert Kalua as fisherman's son
- Flora Suya as fisherman's wife
- Robert Mcloughlin as David, white tourist
- Marian Kunonga

== Production ==
The project marked Shemu Joyah's second directorial venture after Seasons of a Life (2009). The principal photography of the film began in 2012 and was predominantly shot on the shores of the Lake Malawi in Mangochi.

== Awards and nominations ==
The film received a total of five nominations at the 2013 Africa Movie Academy Awards and won the Best Soundtrack award. The film also won the Best Narrative Award at the 2013 Silicon Valley African Film Festival.

Year	Award	Category	Result
2013	9th Africa Movie Academy Awards	Best Film	Nominated
2013	9th Africa Movie Academy Awards	Best Director - Shemu Joyah	Nominated
2013	9th Africa Movie Academy Awards	Best Actress in a leading role - Flora Suya	Nominated
2013	9th Africa Movie Academy Awards	Best Film in an African Language	Nominated
2013	9th Africa Movie Academy Awards	Best Soundtrack	Won
2013	Silicon Valley African Film Festival	Best Narrative	Won
