= Seasons of a Life (film) =

2007 USA–Motswana short film

- Directed by: Shemu Joyah
- Written by: Shemu Joyah
- Based on: Bennie Msuku; Neria Chikhosi; Flora Suya; Tapiwa Gwaza
- Produced by: FirstDawn Arts
- Music by: Oberton Chimombo
- Production company: FirstDawn Arts
- Release date: 31 January 2010 (Sweden)
- Running time: 102 min.
- Country: Malawi
- Language: English

Seasons of a Life, is a 2010 Malawian Legal drama film directed by Shemu Joyah and produced by FirstDawn Arts. The film stars Bennie Msuku in lead role along with Neria Chikhosi, Flora Suya and Tapiwa Gwaza made supportive roles.

This court legal drama focused about a domestic worker sexually molested by her employer who struggles to empower herself and improve her life. The film had its premier at Göteborg International Film Festival in Sweden on 31 January 2010. The film has also been nominated for awards in the Kenya, Cairo, and Zanzibar Film festivals. It was nominated in 8 categories at the 6th Africa Movie Academy Awards, including nominations for Best Screenplay and Best Original Soundtrack. Actress, Tapiwa Gwaza won a Nollywood award for best Performance by a supporting actress.

== Cast ==
- Bennie Msuku as Kondani
- Neria Chikhosi as Thoko
- Flora Suya as Sungisa
- Tapiwa Gwaza as Tabitha
