= Sukez =

Malawian filmmaker, director and media entrepreneur

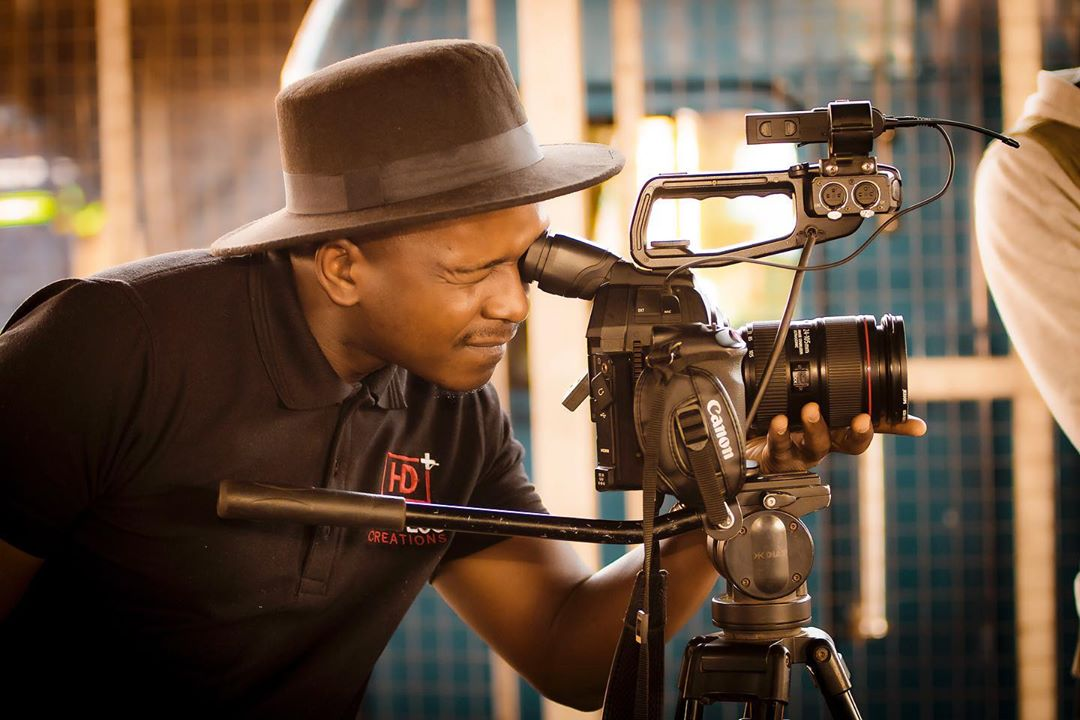
- Sukez in action in 2019
- Born: Gift Sukali; Blantyre, Malawi
- Other names: Director Sukez
- Occupations: Film director, Filmmaker, Entrepreneur
- Years active: 2012–present
- Organization: HD Plus Creations
- Notable work: Music videos for Fredokiss, Gwamba, Faith Mussa; Campaign films and adverts for local and international organizations
- Awards: Africa Magic Viewers' Choice Awards nomination (Best Indigenous Film – Malawi, 2019)

Sukez (born Gift Sukali) is a Malawian film director, filmmaker, and entrepreneur. He is the founder and chief executive officer of HD Plus Creations, a Malawian media company specializing in film production, music videos, and commercial advertisements. Sukez is regarded as one of the pioneers of modern music video production in Malawi.

== Career ==
Sukez began his career in media production around 2012, after studying Management Information System and self-taught skills in graphic designing, photography and video editing. He co-founded HD Plus Creations in Blantyre, which grew to become one of Malawi's most recognized production houses.

He has directed music videos for notable Malawian musicians such as Fredokiss, Gwamba, Faith Mussa, and Kell Kay. Through HD Plus Creations, he has also produced commercial adverts, documentaries, and campaign films for organizations including UNDP, World Bank, and local Malawian NGOs.

His projects have been screened on regional platforms and contributed to Malawi's visibility in the broader African film industry.

In December 2021, his film Fatsani: A Tale of Survival was selected as Malawi's second submission for Best International Feature Film at the 94th Academy Awards, after Shemu Joyah’s The Road to Sunrise in 2018.

== Accolades ==
- Nominated for the Africa Magic Viewers' Choice Awards (AMVCA) in 2019 for Best Indigenous Film – Malawi.
- Recognized at the UMP Awards and Nyasa Music Awards in Malawi for contributions to the creative industry (2017).

== Awards and nominations ==
- 2019 – Nomination at the Africa Magic Viewers' Choice Awards (Best Indigenous Film – Malawi).

== Selected works ==
=== Music videos (as director) ===
- Kalawe – Dzuka Malawi
- Fredokiss – Zausilu
- Gwamba – Better
- Malinga – Levels Remix
- Kell Kay – Milli

=== Film and commercial projects ===
- Fatsani: Tale of Survival (Selected to represent Malawi at OSCARS 2020 )
- The Whistle Blower - Film Fixer, Malawi
- Tsogolo Lanthu Tv Series - Director
- Apongozi TV Series - Producer
- Pamango TV Series (2025) - Producer
- Silent Echoes Short Film (2024) - Writer, Director, and Producer
- Everything is fine Short Film (2025) - Director
- Campaign adverts for UNDP Malawi
- Awareness documentaries for the World Bank Malawi office
- Short films under HD Plus Creations

In 2023, Sukez was selected to study MFA in film in the United States under a Fulbright scholarship at Ohio University
