= August trilogy =

Trilogy of novels by Knut Hamsun

- Wayfarers; August; The Road Leads On
- Author: Knut Hamsun
- Original title: August-trilogien
- Country: Norway
- Language: Norwegian
- Publisher: Gyldendal
- Published: 1927–1933

The August trilogy (Norwegian: August-trilogien), also known as the Wayfarer trilogy (Norwegian: Landstryker-trilogien), is three novels by the Norwegian writer Knut Hamsun: Wayfarers (1927), August (1930) and The Road Leads On (1933).

The August trilogy is set in the second half of the 19th century and early 20th century and follows August, a restless man who finds various ways to make ends meet. It portrays vagabond life and critically discusses modernity, which is an approach that recurs in Hamsun's works. The novels convey an ambivalent view of modernity and a negative view of capitalism.

Wayfarers was the basis for the 1989 Norwegian film Wayfarers directed by Ola Solum.
