= List of Nigerien submissions for the Academy Award for Best International Feature Film =

List of films

Best International Feature Film submissions from Niger

Highlights
- Debut: 2018
- Submissions: 1
- Nominations: none
- Oscar winners: none

Niger submitted a film for the Academy Award for Best International Feature Film (Note: The category was previously named the Academy Award for Best Foreign Language Film, but this was changed to the Academy Award for Best International Feature Film in April 2019, after the Academy deemed the word "Foreign" to be outdated.) for the first time in 2018. The award is handed out annually by the United States Academy of Motion Picture Arts and Sciences to a feature-length motion picture produced outside the United States that contains primarily non-English dialogue. It was not created until the 1956 Academy Awards, in which a competitive Academy Award of Merit, known as the Best Foreign Language Film Award, was created for non-English speaking films, and has been given annually since.

As of 2026, Niger has submitted only one film, The Wedding Ring (2018), which was not nominated.

== Submissions ==
The Academy of Motion Picture Arts and Sciences has invited the film industries of various countries to submit their best film for the Academy Award for Best International Feature Film since 1956. The International Feature Film Committee oversees the process and reviews all the submitted films. Following this, they vote via secret ballot to determine the five nominees for the award.

Below is a list of the films that have been submitted by Niger for review by the Academy for the award by year and the respective Academy Awards ceremony.

| Year (Ceremony) | Film title used in nomination | Original title | Language(s) | Director | Result |
|---|---|---|---|---|---|
| 2018 (91st) | The Wedding Ring | Zin'naariyâ! | Zarma, Hausa, Fulani | Rahmatou Keïta | Not nominated |

== See also ==
- List of Academy Award winners and nominees for Best International Feature Film
- List of Academy Award-winning foreign language films
