= Wayfarers (novel) =

1927 novel by Knut Hamsun

- Author: Knut Hamson
- Publication date: 1927

Wayfarers (Norwegian: Landstrykere) is the first novel in the Wayfarer trilogy, also known as the August trilogy, by the Norwegian writer Knut Hamsun. It was first published in 1927. The novel portrays the wayfarers August and Edevart's experiences with various people and odd-jobs while they travel around in Norway. The trilogy continues with August three years later, and concludes with The Road Leads On in 1933.

== Plot and Themes ==
The events in Wayfarers take place between 1864 and the 1870s. The entire trilogy describes the conflict between a traditional subsistence economy and a modern commercial and industrial society, as it emerged in Norway in the second half of the 1800s and the early 1900s.

== Characters ==
August is the main character that ties the three novels together. He is introduced in Wayfarers in the following manner:

"A wandering young man came back to the village, August by name, an orphan. He was in fact from another district, but he grew up here; now among other things he had been a sailor-boy for some years and had visited many countries, and there were miracles and wonders that he could tell about his life."

== Adaptations ==
The 1989 film Wayfarers was based on the novel.
