= The Road Leads On =

1933 novel by Knut Hamsun

- Author: Knut Hamson
- Publication date: October 5, 1933

The Road Leads On (Norwegian: Men livet lever) is the third novel in the Wayfarer trilogy, also known as the August trilogy, by the Norwegian author Knut Hamsun. It was first published on October 5, 1933. The book received a great deal of publicity in the press at the time of publication and, among other things, was called "the book that everyone has been looking forward to and waiting for for weeks and months."

== Plot ==
August, who had to flee from Polden at the end of August (the second book in the trilogy), reappears fifteen years later in Segelfoss. He is now in his sixties, and he works for the town's largest merchant and eventually also consul, Gordon Tidemand, the son of Theodor at Bua (known from the books Children of the Age and Segelfoss Town). August is only referred to by the people of the town as Altmulig 'the Handyman', and his former desire to create development, change, and greatness seems to be gone. August is now a helper and indispensable handyman, who has apparently found his place under the consul's friendly hand. He grapples with religious musings and a hopeless infatuation with a young girl from a poor farmhouse. One day, Pauline, his wandering comrade Edevart's sister from Polden, comes to Segelfoss with a large sum of money, and August's uncontrollable urge to act is reawakened.
