= The Innocents (2021 film) =

2021 film by Eskil Vogt

- Theatrical release poster
- Norwegian: De uskyldige
- Directed by: Eskil Vogt
- Written by: Eskil Vogt
- Produced by: Maria Ekerhovd
- Starring: Rakel Lenora Fløttum; Alva Brynsmo Ramstad; Sam Ashraf; Mina Yasmin Bremseth Asheim; Ellen Dorrit Petersen; Morten Svartveit; Kadra Yusuf; Lisa Tønne
- Cinematography: Sturla Brandth Grøvlen
- Edited by: Jens Christian Fodstad
- Music by: Pessi Levanto
- Production companies: Zentropa Sweden; Film i Väst; Snowglobe; Svenska Filminstitutet; Norsk Filminstitutt; Eurimages; Protagonist Pictures; YLE
- Distributed by: IFC Midnight (United States)
- Release dates: 11 July 2021 (Cannes); 27 August 2021 (Norway)
- Running time: 118 minutes
- Countries: Norway; Sweden; Finland
- Languages: Norwegian; Swedish
- Budget: €3,028,000; (est. $3.2 million); NOK29 million; ($3.4 million)
- Box office: $321,757

The Innocents (Norwegian: De uskyldige) is a 2021 supernatural dark fantasy horror thriller film written and directed by Eskil Vogt. The film premiered in the Un Certain Regard section of the 74th Cannes Film Festival on 11 July 2021.

== Plot ==
A young girl named Ida and her older sister Anna, who has nonverbal autism, have moved into an apartment with their parents. One day, Ida meets a young boy named Ben, who possesses telekinetic and telepathic abilities, and the two strike up a friendship. While hanging out with Ben, Ida becomes disturbed when he kills a stray cat by crushing its skull after dropping it from the top of the apartment complex's stairs. Ida later meets another girl, Aisha, who has similar abilities to Ben. Anna is later revealed to also have powers and eventually begins to tentatively speak with Aisha's support, much to the joy of her parents. Anna, Aisha, and Ben's powers are strongest when the three are together, with Ida seemingly being the only one in the group who lacks powers.

The children become close friends and practice their powers to strengthen them. However, their friendship is soiled when Ben becomes angry at an insulting telepathic message and injures Anna. Later at home, Ben assaults his abusive mother and eventually kills her, leaving her body in the kitchen.

Ben starts to become increasingly erratic and violent, eventually using his powers to manipulate a neighbor into murdering a bully who had earlier harassed him and Ida. He later confides his mind control abilities to Ida, who initially does not believe him until he causes her to climb on top of a refrigerator, where she hallucinates a snake that Ben claims he did not create mentally. Later, Aisha confronts Ben after he telekinetically snaps the leg of another young boy, causing another fight between the two of them until Ida intervenes. The girls resolve to stop Ben to keep him from hurting them and other people. That night, however, Anna and Ida are not allowed to leave their apartment by their parents, and Aisha is murdered by her mother, who is being manipulated by Ben; consequently, Anna loses her ability to speak.

Ben seemingly tries to kill Anna and Ida next by manipulating a stranger, who unsuccessfully tries to follow them into their apartment. In an attempt to stop Ben, Ida invites him to play with a toy glider and brings him to the highway overpass where the bully was killed, before pushing him off the ledge when he is about to throw the glider. Ben survives the fall and Ida runs off, but soon realizes she is under Ben's control when her surroundings become dark and twisted. Ida runs into the road and is hit by a car; simultaneously, Ben wakes up screaming.

Now stuck at home, Ida is afraid that Ben will manipulate her mother into murdering her and locks herself in the bathroom. Her mother instead leaves to go to the store, and, when Ida leaves the bathroom, she finds that Anna has also left the apartment. Ida loses her crutch while trying to get down the stairs, and, when she screams in pain, her cast cracks open, showing that her leg has healed and revealing that she too has telekinetic powers. Ida goes outside and finds Anna and Ben battling on the shores of a large pond as nearby children watch on. Ben initially gains the upper hand, but his powers weaken as the sisters work together to defeat him, and he is eventually killed by a big burst of energy.

Ida and Anna go back to their apartment and sit in silence until their mother returns home. While playing with her scribble-board, Anna pauses briefly, as if she is about to write something, which suggests she may regain the ability to communicate with Ida.

== Cast ==
- Rakel Lenora Fløttum as Ida
- Alva Brynsmo Ramstad as Anna
- Sam Ashraf as Ben
- Mina Yasmin Bremseth Asheim as Aisha
- Ellen Dorrit Petersen as Henriette
- Morten Svartveit as Ida and Anna's father
- Kadra Yusuf as Aishas' mother
- Lisa Tønne as Ben's mother

== Release ==
The Innocents had its world premiere at the 74th Cannes Film Festival, in the Un Certain Regard section, on 11 July 2021. It later screened at Fantastic Fest in Austin, Texas, in September 2021. Earlier that same month, the film's U.S. distribution rights were acquired by IFC Midnight, and it had a limited release on 13 May 2022. It was released on VOD by RLJ Entertainment on 18 October 2022.

== Reception ==
=== Box office ===
The Innocents grossed $25,705 in the United States and Canada, and $206,366 in other territories for a worldwide total of $232,071, against a production budget of 3.2-3.4 million.

=== Critical response ===
On the review aggregator website Rotten Tomatoes, 96% of 112 critics' reviews are positive, with an average rating of 7.6/10. The website's consensus reads: "The Innocents chillingly subverts the purity of youth in a powerfully acted thriller that lingers long after the credits roll." Metacritic, which uses a weighted average, assigned the film a score of 79 out of 100, based on 24 critics, indicating "generally favorable" reviews.

Leslie Felperin of The Hollywood Reporter called the film "low-tech, high-tension", writing that "The lonely, uncanny and sometimes unthinkingly violent world of childhood is explored with chilling candor and exceptional skill". Jessica Kiang of Variety praised the performances of the child actors as well as the film's atmosphere, calling the film "both a satisfying genre exercise and a minute observation of the process by which young children acquire morality." Sight and Sound's Anton Bitel wrote that the film "uses its genre frame to show the connectedness, curiosity and cruelty of its young characters, and also asks whether the inevitable loss of innocence at this age is a slate that can ever simply be cleaned."
