= Lea Myren =

Norwegian actress and model (born 2001)

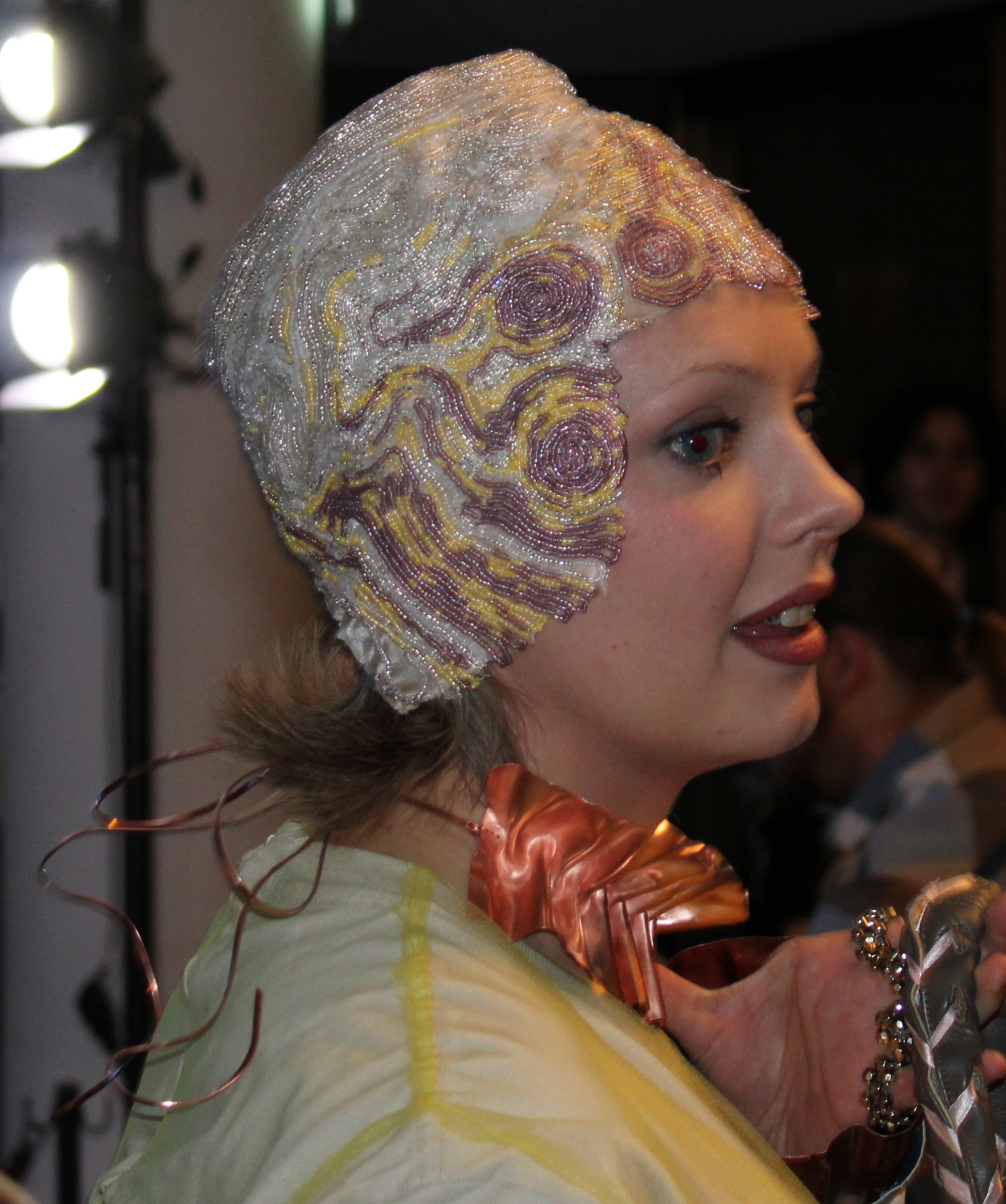
- Myren in February 2025
- Born: Lea Mathilde Skar-Myren; 21 April 2001 (age 25); Elverum, Hedmark, Norway
- Education: Hartvig Nissen School (2017–2020)
- Occupations: Actress, model
- Years active: 2009–present
- Mother: Ane-Marthe Skar

Lea Mathilde Skar-Myren (born 21 April 2001) is a Norwegian actress and fashion model.

She became known for her role as Maya in NRK's drama series Jenter (2013–2015; 2018). She later played Jeanette in NRK's sitcom It's All Relatives (from 2020) and tater girl Monica Larsen in TV 2's drama series Kids in Crime (2022–2024). In 2025, she portrayed Elvira in The Ugly Stepsister, which premiered at the Sundance Film Festival. For the film, she was awarded the 2025 Amanda Award in the category "Newcomer of the Year".

Myren has also had supporting roles in several NRK series, including the sitcom Side om side (2018) and the youth drama Blank (2019).

== Early life and education ==
Lea Mathilde Skar-Myren was born on 21 April 2001, in Elverum, and grew up in Hamar and Oslo, Norway. She is the daughter of researcher Ane-Marthe Skar (born 1980). Myren attended the upper secondary school Fyrstikkalleen School before studying drama at Hartvig Nissen School, where she graduated in 2020. She later studied physical theater at L'École Internationale de Théâtre Jacques Lecoq in Paris.

== Career ==
Myren made her television debut in 2009 in NRK's children's series Superia, where she participated in segments guiding viewers through a video game. In 2013, she played the lead role of Maya in the first season of NRK's drama series Jenter. She remained in the role until 2015, when the series shifted focus to a new group of friends led by Maya's sister. She then made occasional appearances in the series.

In 2018, Myren had a minor role in NRK's sitcom Side om side. The following year, she appeared in the youth drama Blank and the sitcom Allerud VGS. That same year, she had a background role in the play "Dottera" at Det Norske Teatret, and worked as a lighting director for Nissenrevyen. In 2020, she played the lead role of Jeanette in NRK's sitcom It's All Relatives.

In 2021, she worked as a model for the clothing brand Also Worldwide. That same year, she made her feature film debut in Aldri i livet, and appeared in the music video for Kristian Skylstad's "Never Lose That Childish Glow in Your Eyes".

In 2022, Myren starred as Monica "Tatærn" Larsen in TV 2's drama series Kids in Crime. In its second season, released in 2024, she became the show's central character and also served as the narrator. Kids in Crime won four awards at Gullruten 2023. Myren was nominated for Gullruten 2025 in the category "Best Actor in a Leading Role – Drama" for her performance in the series.

In 2025, Myren played Elvira in The Ugly Stepsister, an international co-production between Norway, Poland, Sweden, and Denmark. The film premiered at the Sundance Film Festival. For the film, she was awarded the 2025 Amanda Award in the category "Newcomer of the Year".

== Filmography ==
=== Television ===
Year	Title	Role	Notes
2009	Superia	Herself	Program host
2013–2015; 2018	Jenter	Maya	Lead role (season 1); Supporting role (season 2–5); Special guest star (season 10)
2013	Julemorgen	Herself	Guest appearance
2014–2015	Superkrim	Herself	2 episodes
2018	Side om side	Sofie	Episode: "Foreldrekonflikt"
2019	Blank	Jenny	2 episodes
2020	Allerud VGS	Allergic	Episode: "Verdensblikk"
2020–present	It's All Relatives	Jeanette	Lead role
2021	Maxitaxi Driver	Ingrid	2 episodes
2022	Venner fra før	Indie	5 episodes
2022–2024	Kids in Crime	Monica "Tatærn" Larsen	Lead role
2023	Kø	Sandra	Episode: "Oslo"

=== Film ===
Year	Title	Role	Notes	Ref.
2021	Aldri i Livet	Liv	Bachelor movie at Westerdals Oslo ACT – Kristiania University College	
2025	The Ugly Stepsister	Elvira		

=== Music video ===
Year	Video	Artist	Ref.
2021	"Never Lose That Childish Glow in Your Eyes"	Kristian Skylstad	

=== Commercial ===
Year	Product	Ref.
2017	Childhood by Margreth Olin	
2018	2018 FIFA World Cup at TV 2	
2019	"Stemmer verdt å lytte til" by iceUng	

== Discography ==
- Og forresten heter jeg Leah (2025), a novel by Elida Karo – audiobook
