= Tapiwa Gwaza =

Malawian actress

Tapiwa Sylvia Gwaza
- Born: Malawia
- Occupation: Actress
- Notable work: Seasons of a Life
- Awards: 2010 Africa Movie Academy Awards (AAMA) 2010, Nigeria

Tapiwa Sylvia Gwaza is a Malawian actress known for her role as lawyer in the Malawian film, Seasons of a Life and as Maltrida in Dear Pen Pal in 2018.

== Career ==
Gwaza is a former cabin crew member for Air Malawi Ltd. She worked as an air hostess for 13 years prior to starting her acting career. After resigning from her job at Air Malawi, she decided to take up acting and landed a role in Seasons of a Life.

Fellow actress Flora Suya made her own film, My Mothers Story which was an opening film at the Silicon Valley African Film Festival. Suya was the main actor in her ninety minute film that premiered in May 2016, but she also included others including Gwaza.

When Flora Suya made her 2018 film, Pen Pal about a woman who is tricked into marrying the wrong person- but she later meets the pen pal she thought she had married. Suya cast Gwaza in the main role.

== Works ==
- Seasons of a Life (2010) as Tabitha
- My Mother's Story (2016) as Faith
- The Road to Sunrise (2017) as Nanaweke
- Dear Pen Pal (2018) as Maltrida

== Awards ==
Best Performance by an Actress in a Supporting Role - 2010 Africa Movie Academy Awards (AAMA) 2010, Nigeria
