= I Am Yours (film) =

2013 film

- Film poster
- Norwegian: Jeg er din
- Directed by: Iram Haq
- Written by: Iram Haq
- Produced by: Maria Ekerhovd
- Starring: Amrita Acharia
- Cinematography: Marek Septimus Wieser; Cecilie Semec
- Edited by: Anne Osterud; James Billeskov Jansen
- Music by: Even Vaa
- Production company: Mer Film
- Distributed by: SF Norge; Premium Films
- Release date: 16 August 2013
- Running time: 96 minutes
- Country: Norway
- Languages: Norwegian; Swedish; Urdu

I Am Yours (Norwegian: Jeg er din) is a 2013 Norwegian drama film written and directed by Iram Haq. The film was selected as the Norwegian entry for the Best Foreign Language Film at the 86th Academy Awards, but was not nominated.

== Cast ==
- Amrita Acharia as Mina
- Ola Rapace as Jesper
- Prince Singh as Felix
- Rabia Noreen as Samina
- Trond Fausa as Martin
- Jesper Malm as Simon
- Sudhir Kumar Kohli as Mina's dad
- Assad Siddique as Felix's dad
- Sara Khorami as Felix's stepmom

== Accolades ==
I Am Yours received two Amanda nominations: Best Actress (Acharia) and Best Screenplay (Haq). It was chosen by Norway's Oscar committee to be submitted as Norway's candidate for the Academy Award for Best Foreign Language Film.

== See also ==
- List of submissions to the 86th Academy Awards for Best Foreign Language Film
- List of Norwegian submissions for the Academy Award for Best Foreign Language Film
