= The Wedding Ring (2016 film) =

2016 film

- Directed by: Rahmatou Keïta
- Written by: Rahmatou Keïta
- Starring: Aïchatou Lamine Fofana; Mariam Kaba; Ali Nuhu; Harouna Amoud, Yazi Dogo, Salamatou Kimba Farinwata
- Release date: 9 September 2016 (TIFF)
- Running time: 96 minutes
- Country: Niger
- Languages: Zarma/Songhai, Hausa, Fulani

The Wedding Ring (Zin'naariyâ!) is a 2016 Nigerien drama film directed by Rahmatou Keïta. It was selected as the Nigerien entry for the Best Foreign Language Film at the 91st Academy Awards, but it was not nominated. It was the first film to be submitted by Niger in the Foreign Language Oscar category.

== Cast ==
- Magaajyia Silberfeld as Tiyaa
- Salamatou Kimba Farinwata
- Harouna Amoud
- Yazi Dogo
- Ali Nuhu
- Mariam Kaba
- Aïchatou Lamine Fofana
- Sandor Funtek
- Aïchatou Moussa

== See also ==
- List of submissions to the 91st Academy Awards for Best Foreign Language Film
- List of Nigerien submissions for the Academy Award for Best Foreign Language Film
