= Liv Steen =

Norwegian actress (born 1956)

Liv Steen (born December 8, 1956) is a Norwegian actress. Among other venues, she has worked for the Nordland Theater, Hålogaland Theater, and National Theater. Steen has played prominent roles at the National Theater, such as the title role in Carmen in 1991.

Steen had her film debut in Wayfarers in 1989. She acted in the television series Vestavind from 1994 to 1995, where she played the role of Monica Ahlsen. She portrayed Vidkun Quisling's wife in the 1996 film Hamsun.
