= The Ugly Stepsister =

2025 horror comedy film by Emilie Blichfeldt

- Theatrical release poster
- Norwegian: Den Stygge Stesøsteren
- Directed by: Emilie Blichfeldt
- Screenplay by: Emilie Blichfeldt
- Produced by: Maria Ekerhovd
- Starring: Lea Myren; Thea Sofie Loch Næss; Ane Dahl Torp; Flo Fagerli; Isac Calmroth; Malte Gårdinger
- Cinematography: Marcel Zyskind
- Edited by: Olivia Neergaard-Holm
- Music by: Kaada; Vilde Tuv
- Production companies: Mer Film; Lava Films; Motor; Zentropa
- Distributed by: Scanbox Entertainment
- Release dates: 23 January 2025 (Sundance); 7 March 2025 (Norway); 28 May 2025 (Denmark); 13 June 2025 (Sweden)
- Running time: 109 minutes
- Countries: Norway; Poland; Sweden; Denmark
- Languages: Norwegian; Polish; Danish; Swedish
- Budget: $4.2 million
- Box office: $5.6 million

The Ugly Stepsister (Norwegian: Den Stygge Stesøsteren) is a 2025 satirical black comedy body horror film written and directed by Emilie Blichfeldt, in her feature film directorial debut. An international production mostly in Norwegian, it is loosely based on the 19th century fairytale "Aschenputtel" by the Brothers Grimm, itself a retelling of the French fairy tale "Cinderella"; unlike most versions of the stories revolving around Cinderella, it focuses instead on one of her stepsisters who embarks on a grueling quest to capture the heart of a handsome prince. (Note: Although the Grimms are not the original authors of "Cinderella", their version of the tale, "Aschenputtel" (German for "Little Ash Girl"), notably includes graphic elements not featured in other variants, such as Cinderella's stepsisters mutilating their feet to fit into the slipper, which served as inspiration for The Ugly Stepsister.) It stars Lea Myren, Thea Sofie Loch Næss, Ane Dahl Torp and Flo Fagerli.

The film had its world premiere as the opening film of the Midnight section of the 2025 Sundance Film Festival on 23 January. It was also screened at the Panorama section of the 75th Berlin International Film Festival on 16 February. It was theatrically released in Norway on 7 March by Scanbox Entertainment, in Denmark on 28 May, and in Sweden on 13 June.

It was nominated for several awards in the most important categories, including the Best Makeup and Hairstyling Award at the 98th Academy Awards.

== Plot ==
Rebekka, a widow, has two daughters, Elvira and Alma. She marries an older widower, Otto, who has a beautiful daughter named Agnes. At the family's wedding reception dinner, Otto suddenly dies. Agnes, at first friendly with the new women of the house, remarks in her grief that Otto never would have married a woman as low status as Rebekka if not for the money. It is then revealed each married the other for wealth, because neither had any of their own. Much of Otto's assets are immediately seized.

Royal heralds announce that all noble young virgins are invited to a ball, where Prince Julian will choose a wife. To save them from poverty, Rebekka plans to marry off Elvira, her eldest daughter, to Julian. While Elvira dreams of marrying the prince and carries around a book of his poetry, Rebekka considers her too ugly to succeed. To improve Elvira's chances with the prince, Rebekka subjects her to a series of primitive and painful cosmetic surgeries.

Elvira and Agnes are both enrolled in Sophie von Kronenberg's finishing school for girls. During dance classes, Agnes is brought to stand at the front of the room with the pretty girls, whereas Elvira is relegated to the back with the uglier girls. The dance teacher later humiliates Elvira in front of the class by acknowledging that, while Elvira is a talented dancer, her talent is "wasted" due to her looks, and that Rebekka paid her to include Elvira in the performance. This causes Elvira's initial admiration for her stepsister to turn to resentment. Sophie later gives Elvira a tapeworm egg for weight loss, telling her she is doing a brave thing trying to make her outside match her inside. At home, Agnes reprimands her stepmother for spending their remaining money on Elvira's beauty treatments instead of paying to bury her father, whose rotting corpse is being stored in a disused room of the house.

Elvira and Alma take a ride through the forest, where Elvira reveals the tapeworm egg. Disgusted, Alma rides off, leaving her sister behind, and Elvira swallows the egg. Elvira encounters Prince Julian in the woods by chance, but he mocks her appearance and is revealed to be a shallow womanizer, though Elvira continues to be smitten with him. That night, Elvira discovers Agnes having sex with Isak, the stable boy, and tells Rebekka. Disgusted, Rebekka throws Isak out and makes Agnes a servant, with the family calling her Cinderella. As the royal ball approaches, Elvira becomes malnourished and her hair starts falling out due to the tapeworm. Meanwhile, Alma has her first period, but does not tell her mother for fear she will be subjected to the same horrors as Elvira. Rebekka also has Agnes pulled from finishing school, leaving no one in the starring role for the dance the school will perform at the ball. Due to her changed appearance after the weight loss and cosmetic surgeries, Elvira is given the role.

During a dress fitting, the dress merchant provides Elvira with an elegant ball gown and a blonde wig to hide her hair loss. Elvira later sees Agnes with a ball gown that belonged to Agnes's late mother and angrily destroys it. Sleeping next to her father's corpse, Agnes awakens to a vision of her mother, who gives her a beautiful pair of shoes and warns her that the carriage will turn back into a pumpkin by midnight. Agnes's gown is mended by silkworms from her father's body.

At the ball, Elvira attracts Prince Julian's interest and he chooses her to be his partner for the opening dance, but he quickly shifts his attention to a veiled Agnes, who arrives late. Elvira becomes ill from the tapeworm, retreats to another room and vomits up tapeworm eggs. Rebekka forces her to dance with other men, whereupon Elvira sees Agnes without the veil. Agnes flees as the clock strikes midnight, leaving one shoe behind. Prince Julian declares he will marry the woman whose foot fits the shoe. Back home, aware that Agnes left behind a slipper, Elvira attacks Agnes with a butcher knife and demands the other shoe. Since her feet are too large, Elvira attempts to sever her toes using the knife. Rebekka coldly remarks that Elvira mutilated the wrong foot. Rebekka sedates Elvira and mutilates the "correct" foot, horrifying Alma.

The next morning, Elvira hears trumpets announcing the prince's arrival. Unable to walk, she crawls across the floor, then falls down a flight of stairs, breaking her nose and chipping her teeth, only to find that the prince and Agnes have already found each other. Alma convinces Elvira to take an antidote to expel the tapeworm, which has grown to an enormous size. The sisters steal their mother's jewelry and leave so they can live free from her tyranny, while Rebekka fellates a nobleman whose attention she stole from Elvira at the ball; she notices her daughters leaving but does not stop them. A pair of ravens eat the tapeworm's remains as the sisters ride away. Otto's rotting corpse remains forgotten in the house.

== Cast ==
- Lea Myren as Elvira, the eldest of Cinderella's new stepsisters
- Ane Dahl Torp as Rebekka, Elvira's mother
- Thea Sofie Loch Næss as Agnes/Cinderella, Elvira's beautiful stepsister
- Flo Fagerli as Alma, Elvira's younger sister
- Isac Calmroth as Prince Julian
- Malte Myrenberg Gårdinger as Isak, a stable boy in service of Elvira's family
- Ralph Carlsson as Otto, Cinderella's father
- Cecilia von der Esch as Sophie von Kronenberg
- Katarzyna Herman as Madame Wandzia
- Adam Lundgren as Dr. Esthétique
- Willy Ramnek Petri as Frederik von Bluckfish
- Kyrre Hellum as Jan
- Oksana Czerkasyn as the chef
- Richard Forsgren as the steward
- Agnieszka Żulewska as Agnes' mother

== Production ==
Writer and director Emilie Blichfeldt began developing The Ugly Stepsister while working on her thesis project at Norwegian Film School. Initially following a woman with a "talking vulva that tells her she's lonely", Blichfeldt took influence from "Aschenputtel", the Brothers Grimm's version of the Cinderella story, and reimagined the character to be one of Cinderella's stepsisters cutting off her toes to fit in the glass slipper. She was unfamiliar with the body horror genre until she watched David Cronenberg's 1996 film Crash in 2015, which led her to "a deep dive into anything Cronenberg" and discovering the filmographies of Italian film directors Dario Argento and Lucio Fulci. Their films, along with Julia Ducournau's Raw (2016), led her to utilize body horror for the film. The script was informed by Blichfeldt's "own struggles with body image", which she intended to "provoke both empathy and discomfort and inspire [the film's] audience to reflect upon their perceptions of, and relationship to, beauty."

When she was growing up, Blichfeldt regularly watched the Norwegian dub of the "camp" film Three Wishes for Cinderella, which she credited as an influence "to create a timeless, once-upon-a-time feeling" for The Ugly Stepsister's visual style. Walerian Borowczyk, a Polish director known for producing pornographic films, was a "surprising" influence for Blichfeldt, who resonated with the way he filmed "natural, beautiful bod[ies]" and the "cheeky, sexy grotesqueness" of his work.

The film was produced by Maria Ekerhovd of Mer Film, in co-production with Lizette Jonjic, Zentropa Sweden, Mariusz Włodarski, Lava Films and Theis Nørgaard, Motor, with the support from the Norwegian Film Institute, the Polish Production Incentive and the Polish Film Institute, the Swedish Film Institute, the Danish Film Institute, Eurimages, DR, the Nordic Council Film Prize, and the Western Norwegian Film Center. It is distributed by Scanbox Entertainment, whereas international sales rights are with Memento International.

The crew of the film consisted of costume designer Manon Rasmussen, cinematographer Marcel Zyskind, editor Border Olivia Neergaard-Holm, visual effects supervisor Peter Hjort, and visual effects make-up artist Thomas Foldberg.

== Release ==
The Ugly Stepsister premiered at the Sundance Film Festival on 23 January 2025 in the Midnight Section, and screened in the Panorama section of the 75th Berlin International Film Festival on 16 February 2025. It won the Director's Choice for Best Feature at the Boston Underground Film Festival in March 2025. It was also showcased at the 53rd Norwegian International Film Festival as Amanda Award nominee on 16 August 2025.

On 10 October 2025, it competed at the 58th Sitges Film Festival in the 'Oficial Fantàstic Competició' section, vying for the various awards given in the section.

Shudder, an American over-the-top subscription video-on-demand service, acquired the distribution rights for North America, the United Kingdom, Australia, and New Zealand in December 2024. The film has also been sold by Memento to ESC FIlms Capelight, Beta Film, Lev Cinema, ADS, Cay Films, Cine Canibal, New Select, House of M, PT Falcon, Estin Film, and Vendetta Filmes.

The film was released in Norwegian cinemas on 7 March 2025 by Scanbox.

The film was released in US cinemas on 18 April 2025 by IFC Films.

== Reception ==
=== Critical response ===
On the review aggregator website Rotten Tomatoes, 96% of 127 critics' reviews are positive. The website's consensus reads: "Taking a hammer and chisel to a quintessential fairy tale, The Ugly Stepsister's masterful application of gore and subversion are the stuff that nightmares are made of." Metacritic, which uses a weighted average, assigned the film a score of 70 out of 100, based on 22 critics, indicating "generally favorable" reviews.

Peter Bradshaw of The Guardian gave the film 3/5 stars, calling it "a movie hyper-aware of the sexual and patriarchal imagery of Cinderella, a film in the post-feminist tradition of Angela Carter and, unlike Michael Pataki's lowbrow 1977 porn-musical version, it avoids the obvious sexual symbolism of the foot in the slipper. Blichfeldt has made an elegant debut." The Times's Kevin Maher also gave it 3/5 stars, writing, "That's impressive — 30 years of film criticism and this is the first time that I've had to turn away from the screen for fear of retching. It's not an especially gross scene with, say, bodies blown asunder (see last week's Warfare). It is instead a deeply unnerving moment from this Cinderella redux by the Norwegian film-maker Emilie Blichfeldt, making her provocative debut." Peter Debruge of Variety wrote, "Contrasting how her female characters feel with the expectations men put on them, Blichfeldt makes clear that impossible beauty standards are the unfairest of them all, whether in the real world or this twisted fictional kingdom."

=== Accolades ===
Award	Date	Category	Recipient	Result	Ref.
Berlin International Film Festival	23 February 2025	Panorama Audience Award for Best Feature Film	Emilie Blichfeldt	Nominated	
Boston Underground Film Festival	24 March 2025	Director's Choice for Best Feature	Emilte Blichfeldt	Won	
Fangoria Chainsaw Awards	09 July 2025	Best Wide Release	The Ugly Stepsister	Nominated	
Fangoria Chainsaw Awards	09 July 2025	Best First Feature	The Ugly Stepsister	Won	
Fangoria Chainsaw Awards	09 July 2025	Best International Movie	The Ugly Stepsister	Nominated	
Fangoria Chainsaw Awards	09 July 2025	Best Lead Performance	Lea Myren	Nominated	
Fangoria Chainsaw Awards	09 July 2025	Best Costume Design	Manon Rasmussen	Nominated	
Bucheon International Fantastic Film Festival	11 July 2025	Best Picture	The Ugly Stepsister	Won	
Amanda Award	16 August 2025	Best Screenplay	Emilie Blichfeldt	Nominated	
Amanda Award	16 August 2025	Best Actor in a Supporting Role	Ane Dahl Torp	Nominated	
Amanda Award	16 August 2025	Best Costume Design	Manon Rasmussen	Nominated	
Amanda Award	16 August 2025	Best Visual Effects	Maciej Rynkiewicz (XANF)	Nominated	
Amanda Award	16 August 2025	Best Debut Performance	Lea Myren	Won	
Amanda Award	16 August 2025	Best Make-Up Design	Thomas Foldberg og Anne Cathrine Sauerberg	Won	
Sitges Film Festival	18 October 2025	Best Feature Film	The Ugly Stepsister	Won	
Academy Awards	15 March 2026	Best Makeup and Hairstyling	Thomas Foldberg and Anne Cathrine Sauerberg	Nominated	
