= Magaajyia Silberfeld =

French actress (born 1996)

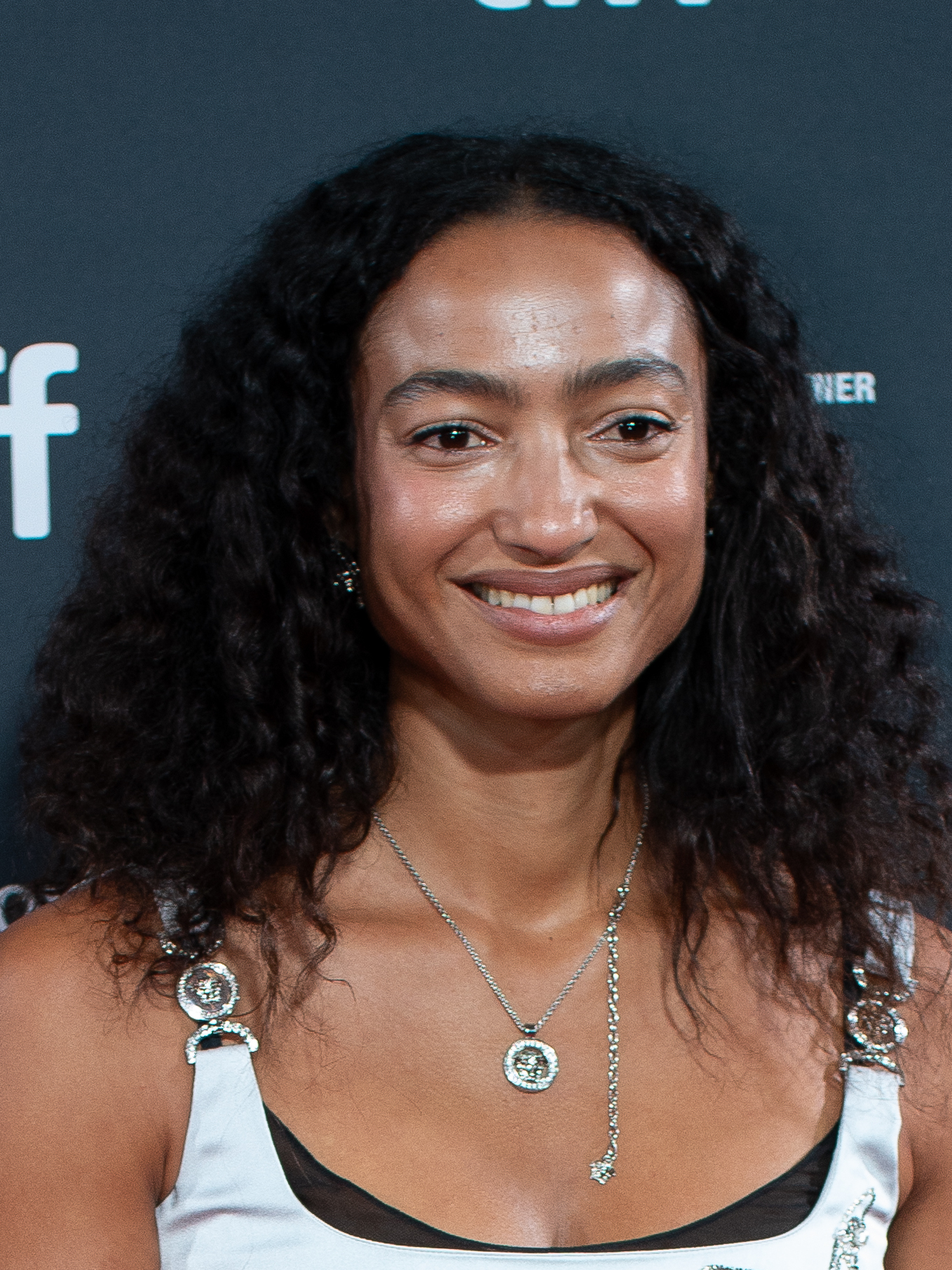
- Silberfeld in 2024
- Born: 30 August 1996 (age 29); Paris, France
- Occupations: Film director, actress

Sarah Magaajyia Silberfeld (born 30 August 1996) is a French actress and film director.

== Biography ==
Silberfeld is the granddaughter of Jacques Silberfeld, the daughter of film director Rahmatou Keïta and French journalist Antoine Silber. She began acting at the local theater at the age of 11. Silberfeld grew up in France but travelled frequently to Greece, Niger, and Mali, and lived in Los Angeles for three years. She made her film debut in 2011, in La Lisière. Silberfeld studied acting at the Lee Strasberg Institute in 2013, at Playhouse West Repertory Theater in 2014 and at Susan Batson Studio in 2015. At the age of 18, she wrote and directed her first short film, Me There and co-directed Ride or Die featuring Piper De Palma and Roxane Depardieu.

In 2016, Silberfeld had her first leading role in The Wedding Ring, directed by her mother and financed entirely through African funds. She played Tiyaa, a young woman who goes to study in France and falls in love with a man from a prestigious background. The film became the first Nigerien film to be played at the Academy Awards. In 2017, she directed her short film Vagabonds, starring Danny Glover. The same year, Silberfeld obtained a philosophy degree from the Sorbonne. During college, she learned English through watching American films.

She served as a curator during the 2019 Fribourg International Film Festival and sponsored the Charter for Equality and Diversity. Silberfeld presented her mother's documentary Al’lèèssi... Une actrice africaine (2004), a portrait of the Nigerien actress Zalika Souley.

In 2021, she says she takes her cue from Doris Payne, a comfortable and elegant 90-year-old African-American diamond thief with Native American blood.

== Filmography ==
- 2011: La Lisière (actress)
- 2014: Me There (short film, co-writer/director)
- 2015: Ride or Die (short film, co-director)
- 2016: The Wedding Ring (actress)
- 2017: Vagabonds (short film, writer/director)
- 2023: Greek Salad (TV series)
- 2024: The Return (2024 film)
