= Hope Chisanu =

Malawian musician

- Born: October 12, 1983; Lilongwe, Malawi
- Died: June 1, 2024 (aged 40); United States
- Occupations: Politician; Actor
- Years active: 1998–2024

Hope Chisanu (October 12, 1983 – June 1, 2024) was a Malawian actor, politician and radio personality at the Malawi Broadcasting Corporation (MBC). He appeared in a leading role in the Malawian award-winning movies The Last Fishing Boat and Seasons of a Life.

On radio, he worked as the radio host at MBC and was known for hosting pro-DPP programs such as 'Never Again.'

== Background ==
=== Early life and education ===
Chisanu was born in Lilongwe, Malawi. His acting and drama career began at Dzenza Secondary School, where he was an active member of the school's drama club. After completing secondary education, he pursued a degree in journalism at Blantyre International University.

Chisanu holds a bachelor's degree in journalism from Blantyre International University. His academics equipped him with the skills and knowledge to pursue a career in broadcasting and journalism.

In 2023, he was fired by MBC.

=== Political career ===
Chisanu was an ardent supporter of the Democratic Progressive Party (DPP) and was known for his biased reporting in favor of the party. He hosted pro-DPP programs on MBC, including "Never Again," which was criticized for its partisan approach. His political allegiance led to controversy and eventual disciplinary action.

== Allegations ==
Chisanu faced allegations of biased reporting, propaganda, and promoting hate speech through his programs. Critics accused him of using his platform to spread misinformation and further the interests of the DPP.

== Personal life ==
Chisanu was married and had a daughter, Walinase Chisanu. He died in the United States on June 1, 2024.
