= What Will People Say =

2017 film by Iram Haq

- Norwegian theatrical release poster
- Norwegian: Hva vil folk si
- Directed by: Iram Haq
- Written by: Iram Haq
- Produced by: Maria Ekerhovd
- Starring: Maria Mozhdah; Adil Hussain
- Cinematography: Nadim Carlsen
- Edited by: Anne Østerud; Janus Billeskov Jansen
- Music by: Lorenz Dangel; Martin Pedersen
- Production companies: Mer Film; Film i Väst; Zentropa Sweden; Rohfilm Factory GmbH
- Distributed by: Mer Film (Norway); Folkets Bio (Sweden); Pandora Film Verleih (Germany)
- Release dates: 9 September 2017 (TIFF); 6 October 2017 (Norway); 9 March 2018 (Sweden); 10 May 2018 (Germany)
- Running time: 106 minutes
- Countries: Norway; Germany; Sweden
- Languages: Norwegian; Urdu
- Box office: $2.2 million

What Will People Say (Norwegian: Hva vil folk si) is a 2017 coming-of-age drama film written and directed by Iram Haq. An international co-production of Norway, German and Sweden, the film is inspired by Haq's own life. The scenes set in Pakistan were all shot in India, mostly in Rajasthan.

The film had its world premiere at the 42nd Toronto International Film Festival on 9 September 2017. It was selected as the Norwegian entry for the Best Foreign Language Film at the 91st Academy Awards, but it was not nominated.

== Plot ==
Sixteen-year-old Nisha is living a double life with her parents in Oslo, Norway. She plays basketball with her Norwegian friends, parties, drinks, and has a Norwegian boyfriend named Daniel. At home, she behaves like a docile daughter in her traditional Pakistani Muslim family.

One night, Nisha's father, Mirza, catches Nisha with Daniel in her room and angrily beats him. Neighbors hear the screams and call the police, and Nisha is taken to a child welfare agency. There, Nisha blames herself for what happened while a counselor reassures her that she has done nothing wrong. Mirza, assuming the two had had sex, is willing to accept Nisha back home on the condition that she marries Daniel. Nisha protests that they did not, but Mirza does not believe her. Family friends in the Pakistani community urge Mirza to do something about Nisha, warning him that she will rebel further and negatively influence other children in the community.

Mirza, fearing for the family reputation, forcibly takes Nisha with him to Pakistan and leaves her in his sister's home. Before returning to Norway, he tries and fails to make amends with Nisha, emotionally insisting that he wants what is best for her. Eight months later, Nisha has learned cooking and household chores while attending the local school. She once sneaks into a cyber cafe and sends a Facebook message to her friend in Norway for help, but is caught by her aunt, beaten, and locked up. Her uncle then burns her passport, leaving her with no other choice but to adjust to life there.

Nisha and her first cousin Amir, her aunt's son, start to develop feelings for each other. As she grows closer to him and enjoys spending time with her other cousins, Nisha finally begins to feel some semblance of happiness. She and Amir venture out into the streets late one night and are caught kissing in an alley by policemen. The policemen beat Amir, force Nisha to strip and coerce her and Amir into performing sensual acts, while taunting and taking pictures of them. They then take the two home and blackmail Nisha's aunt and uncle with the incriminating pictures, forcing them to pay money. Although Nisha insists that all she and Amir did was kiss, her aunt calls Mirza to tell him that Nisha seduced Amir into having sex with her, ordering Mirza to come take Nisha back immediately.

Mirza arrives in Pakistan and pleads with his sister and brother-in-law to allow Nisha and Amir to marry, in order to put an end to community gossip. They refuse, and Mirza takes Nisha back to Norway. En route, he orders her to jump off a cliff, screaming that she has ruined his life; horrified, she cries and begs her father for forgiveness, and both break down. Once home, Nisha's mother receives her coldly; she and Mirza begin to watch Nisha closely, forcing her to change schools and forbidding her from contacting her old friends. Isolated and depressed, Nisha silently settles back into life in Norway, desperate to earn back her family's trust and approval. The child welfare agency calls the family in for a meeting; Nisha's mother accuses Nisha of notifying the agency and threatens her into lying about all that happened. The counselors produce the Facebook message that Nisha had sent to her friend months before, which detailed her kidnap, and gently ask her if it is true; Nisha insists that she went to Pakistan of her own will and had sent the message in a moment of anger.

Nisha comes home one day to find her parents hosting Pakistani family friends for dinner, and is horrified to learn that they have arranged her marriage to the family's son living in Canada. Mirza, after happily stating that Nisha will continue her studies and have a career in Canada, is visibly upset but silent when the future in-laws reply that they intend for Nisha to be a housewife and raise a family. Shattered, later that night Nisha climbs out of her bedroom window to run away. As she looks back, she makes eye contact with her father, who watches down on her from a window with tears in his eyes. He does nothing to stop her, watching her as she flees.

== Cast ==
- Maria Mozhdah as Nisha
- Adil Hussain as Mirza, Nisha's father
- Ekavali Khanna as Najma, Nisha's mother
- Rohit Suresh Saraf as Amir, Nisha's cousin
- Ali Arfan as Asif, Nisha's older brother
- Sheeba Chaddha as Nisha's paternal aunt, Mirza's sister
- Jannat Zubair Rahmani as Salima, Nisha's cousin
- Lalit Parimoo as Nisha's uncle
- Farukh Jaffer as Nisha's grandmother and Mirza's mother

== Reception ==
On the review aggregator website Rotten Tomatoes, the film holds an approval rating of 78%, based on 41 reviews, with an average rating of 7/10. The website's critics consensus reads, "What Will People Say? argues that institutional sexism starts at home – and the results can be as powerful as they are difficult to watch." Metacritic gives the film a weighted average rating of 69 out of 100, based on 15 critics, indicating "generally favorable" reviews.

== See also ==
- List of submissions to the 91st Academy Awards for Best Foreign Language Film
- List of Norwegian submissions for the Academy Award for Best Foreign Language Film
