= Trond Peter Stamsø Munch =

Norwegian actor (born 1960)

- Born: 13 November 1960

Trond Peter Stamsø Munch (born November 13, 1960) is a Norwegian actor.

He graduated from the Norwegian National Academy of Theater and has been engaged with the Trøndelag Theater since 1989. He is married to the writer and playwright Tale Næss Lysestøl.

== Selected Trøndelag Theater roles ==
- 2004: An-Magritt - Jürgen Smelteknekt
- 2006: Berlinerpoplene - Christer
- 2007: King Lear - Cornwall
- 2007: The Wild Duck - Dr. Relling

== Filmography ==
- 1983: The Pirates - Ronnie
- 1990: Shipwrecked - Jens
- 1990: Wayfarers - Edevart
- 1996: Offshore (TV Series) - Gunnar
- 2007: Brekk (Short) - Werner
- 2014: Out of Nature - Far
- 2017: 12th Man - Aslak Fossvoll
