= Wayfarers (film) =

1989 film

- Directed by: Ola Solum
- Written by: Hans Lindgren; Lars Saabye Christensen; Ola Solum
- Based on: Wayfarers by Knut Hamsun
- Produced by: Gunnar Svensrud; Peter Bøe (production manager)
- Starring: Trond Peter Stamsø Munch; Marika Lagercrantz; Helge Jordal
- Cinematography: Harald Paalgard
- Edited by: Yngve Refseth
- Music by: Henning Sommerro
- Distributed by: Norsk Film
- Release date: August 17, 1989
- Running time: 138 minutes
- Country: Norway
- Language: Norwegian

Wayfarers (Norwegian: Landstrykere) is a 1989 Norwegian feature film directed by Ola Solum. The screenplay was written by Hans Lindgren, Lars Saabye Christensen, and Solum. It is based on the 1927 novel Wayfarers by Knut Hamsun. The film depicts Nordland during the transition between the era of the "privileged traders" and modernity in the 1860s.

The film was released on DVD in 2009.

== Cast ==
- Trond Peter Stamsø Munch as Edevart
- Marika Lagercrantz as Lovise Magrete
- Helge Jordal as August
- Liv Heløe as Ragna
- Liv Steen as Ane Maria
- Espen Skjønberg as Knoff
- John Sigurd Kristensen as Karolus
- Lasse Lindtner as Skaaro
- Hildegun Riise as Miss Ellingsen
- Frank Krog as Haakon Doppen
