= Silicon Valley African Film Festival =

Annual film festival in California

The Silicon Valley African Film Festival (SVAFF) is an annual film festival held in California to promote an understanding and appreciation of Africa and Africans through moving images. Nigerian filmmaker Chike Nwoffiah founded the SVAFF in 2010 and has served as its director since. According to Nwoffiah, "People’s understanding of Africa was limited to the Tarzan narratives of Africa as backward, untamed and uncivilized. Those who thought they knew better, at best, saw Africa as a 'country' with starving children and a people ravaged by disease and war." He founded the SVAFF to change that.

== History ==
Year	Dates	Venue	Notes
2010	-	-	-
2011	-	-	-
2012	-	-	-
2013	October 11-13	Mountain View, California	It featured an interactive forum titled African Women in Technology - A Future of Promise, in partnership with the African Diaspora Network and Institute of International Education.
2014	-	-	-
2015	-	-	-
2016	October 14-16	Mountain View, California	Movies screened include My Mother's Story by Flora Suya and Fastest Woman in Africa - Rwanda’s First Cyclist Woman by Faustin Niyigena. Brazil's diaspora was given a special spotlight. Danny Glover attended the festival.
2017	September 29-October 1	Historic Hoover Theatre, San Jose, California	Ghanaian-Nigerian romantic comedyPotato Potahto by Shirley Frimpong-Manso premiered at the festival.
2018	-	-	-
2019	October 4-6	Historic Hoover Theatre, San Jose, California	Films screened include Zimbabwean romantic comedy Cook Off, by Tomas Brickhill.
2020	October 9-11		#LANDoftheBRAVEfilm, directed by Tim Huebschle, won the prize for the Best Narrative Feature. The short film Mébét, produced and directed by Ousman Jarju, was selected by the festival.
2021	October 8-10	Hybrid	Screened films include L’enfant de l’autre by Cameroonian-born Patricia Kwende; Two Good Hearts; and Wedding Dress. Ntare Guma Mbaho Mwine won the Cultural Icon Award.
2022	October 13-16	Historic Hoover Theatre, San Jose, California	The Ugandan film Your Turn was screened.
2023			
2024			
2025			
2026	October 8-11	Historic Hoover Theatre, San Jose, California	Opening night feature film was Afrotōpia directed by David Mboussou
