= Fina Girard =

Swiss activist and politician (born 2001)

Member of the Grand Council of Basel-Stadt
- Incumbent
- Assumed office 8 February 2023
- Preceded by: Beatrice Messerli
- Constituency: Grossbasel-West

Personal details
- Born: 20 October 2001 (age 24) Basel, Switzerland
- Party: Green Party of Switzerland
- Other political affiliations: Green-Alternative Alliance; Young Greens
- Education: University of Basel (attending)

Fina Girard (born 20 October 2001) is a Swiss climate activist and politician who has served on the Grand Council of Basel-Stadt since 2023. A member of the Green Party and the Young Greens, she represents the Grossbasel-West constituency. Prior to entering politics, she was a member of the Basel climate strike and was co-president of the local branch of the Young Greens.

== Biography ==
=== Early life and activism ===
Fina Girard was born on 20 October 2001 in Basel, Switzerland. The daughter of a taxi driver and a museum curator, she attended the Gymnasium Leonhard. At the age of fourteen, she joined Amnesty International's youth group in Basel, and completed a one-year internship with the organization after graduating high school. She is also one of the group's workshop leaders. Girard attends the University of Basel, studying political science and geography.

Experiencing eco-anxiety as a teenager, Girard has been active in the Basel climate strike since 2019, and joined the Young Green Alliance Northwest – the local branch of the Young Greens – the following year. In the 2020 election for the Grand Council of Basel-Stadt, Girard ran as a Green Party candidate, but was narrowly defeated. In August 2021, she was elected co-president of the Young Green Alliance Northwest, and was previously a member of its board. She is also an elected member of Alliance F.

=== Political career ===
On 8 February 2023, Girard was appointed to the Grand Council of Basel-Stadt to succeed Beatrice Messerli, who resigned. She represents the Grossbasel-West constituency as a member of the Green-Alternative Alliance, and serves on the Economic and Tax Commission, the Disciplinary Commission, and the Pardon Commission. At the time of her appointment, Girard was one of four Young Greens serving in the Grand Council.

During her tenure on the Grand Council, Girard was part of a delegation sent by the city of Basel to Van Province in eastern Turkey during the 2023 Turkish presidential election. An advocate for climate-friendly mobility, she has supported increased public transit as part of a plan to make Basel carbon-neutral by 2037. She has also advocated for "reproductive health and perinatal care" for female asylum seekers, and supports lowering the voting age to sixteen.

Girard was a Green Party candidate for the National Council in the 2023 Swiss federal election, but was not elected.
