= August (Hamsun novel) =

1930 novel by Knut Hamsun

- Author: Knut Hamsun
- Publication date: 1 October 1930

August is the second novel in the Wayfarer trilogy, also known as the August trilogy, by the Norwegian author Knut Hamsun. The novel was published on 1 October 1930.

== Plot ==
Twenty years have passed since the action in Wayfarers, and August has settled in his home village of Polden. August's identity is built on a grand delusion and he lives a good and simple life as a sailor who has just returned from America. August is a man who wants to make changes, improve, and renew everything.
