= Allerud VGS =

- Genre: Sitcom
- Created by: Øyvind Thoen
- Starring: Christian Skolmen; Selome Emnetu; Marte Mørland; Anette Hoff; Øystein Bache; Herman Flesvig; John Brungot; Lisa Tønne; Amalie Stuve; Helle Ryg Eia; Johannes Gjessing
- Country of origin: Norway
- Original language: Norwegian
- No. of seasons: 1
- No. of episodes: 8

Production
- Running time: 27–37 minutes

Original release
- Network: NRK
- Release: 11 January – 29 February 2020

Allerud VGS (English: Allerud High School) is a Norwegian sitcom series that premiered in 2020 on NRK.

The setting is the fictional upper secondary school (VGS being an abbreviation of upper secondary school) Allerud in Oslo. Here the incompetent principal (Christian Skolmen) has to improve the faltering application numbers. He hires a competent inspector (Selome Emnetu) to improve the school, at the same time fearing that she might take over his job. The rest of the main cast include schoolteachers (Marte Mørland, Anette Hoff, Øystein Bache, Herman Flesvig), other school staff (John Brungot, Lisa Tønne) and pupils (Amalie Stuve, Helle Ryg Eia, Johannes Gjessing).

The filming was mostly conducted at Fornebu.

At the premiere, the series was given a "die throw" of 4 in Aftenposten and in Stavanger Aftenblad; 3 in Dagbladet and 2 in VG.
