= Flora Suya =

Malawian actress

- Occupations: Actress and film maker
- Known for: Seasons of a Life (2010); The Last Fishing Boat (2013)

Flora Suya is a Malawian actress. She was nominated as best actress at the 6th and 9th Africa Movie Academy Awards ceremonies.

== Career ==
Alongside Tapiwa Gwaza, Suya played the lead role in Seasons of a Life (2010), which narrates the ordeal of an African maid who was sexually violated by her boss, who then denied her custody of her child. She got Africa Movie Academy Award for Best Actress in a Leading Role for her role in the film. In 2013, she starred in Shemu Joyah, Last Fishing Boat, where she was the love interest of a tourist and wife of a polygamous man, the role got her nominated as best actress at AMAA awards. In 2014, she filmed her part in the Zambian film, Chenda, which tells a story about the trouble barren women have and the negative reaction of African men towards their condition. The film was launched in December 2014, and released in 2015.

In 2016, her film, My Mothers Story was announced as one of the opening films at the Silicon Valley African Film Festival in United States. the film tells a story of the sufferings women go through to secure their home without help from a husband. In the film, she plays Tadala, a single mother in a gender and culturally sensitive African setting. She was the main actor in the ninety minute film that premiered in Lilongwe in May, but she also included Tapiwa Gwaza and Miriam Mwazimva.

When Flora Suya made her 2018 film, Pen Pal about a woman who is tricked into marrying the wrong person but later meets her pen pal. Suya again cast Tapiwa Gwaza, this time in the main role.

In 2020 she returned to Zambia to appear in three episodes of the daily soap, Zuba.

In 2025 she stood to be the President of the Film Association of Malawi but she was defeated by entrepreneur Dorothy Kingston.
