= African Diaspora Network =

US-based nonprofit organization

The African Diaspora network or ADN is a Silicon Valley–based nonprofit organization founded in 2010 to mobilize the intellectual, financial, and social capital of Africans and friends of Africa. Based in Santa Clara, California, ADN convenes diaspora leaders, entrepreneurs, and philanthropists to advance sustainable development across Africa and within Black communities. Its largest programs include the African Diaspora Investment Symposium (ADIS), Builders of Africa's Future, and Accelerating Black Leadership and Entrepreneurship (ABLE).

Almaz Negash is the founder of the African Diaspora Network (ADN). She was appointed as one of the 12 founding members of President Biden's Advisory Council on African Diaspora Engagement in the United States. Almaz Negash supports efforts to connect and empower Africans.

== Programs and initiatives ==
The African Diaspora Network is involved in organizing the African Diaspora Investment Symposium or ADIS, which is a forum for advancing diaspora-driven development. Hosted in Silicon Valley and Washington DC, the symposium highlights the creativity and entrepreneurial energy of Africans in the diaspora and their partners all over the world.

The African Diaspora Network has helped startups in healthcare, education, energy, and agriculture. Since its launching, the program has supported African enterprises by offering business development training, mentorship, and access to networks.

In 2024, this organization conducted the All-African Diaspora Education Summit in Ghana for students and brought in American educators.

== See also ==
- African diaspora
- Silicon Valley
