= From the Balcony (film) =

2017 film

- Directed by: Ole Giæver
- Written by: Ole Giæver
- Starring: Ole Giæver
- Release date: 12 February 2017 (Berlin)
- Country: Norway
- Language: Norwegian

From the Balcony (Norwegian: Fra balkongen) is a 2017 Norwegian drama film directed by Ole Giæver. It was screened in the Panorama section at the 67th Berlin International Film Festival.

== Cast ==
- Ole Giæver
