= Out of Nature =

2014 film

- Film poster
- Directed by: Ole Giæver; Marte Vold
- Written by: Ole Giæver
- Starring: Ole Giæver
- Release dates: 6 September 2014 (TIFF); 19 September 2014 (Norway)
- Running time: 80 minutes
- Country: Norway
- Language: Norwegian

Out of Nature (Norwegian: Mot naturen) is a 2014 Norwegian comedy film written, co-directed by and starring Ole Giæver with Marte Vold as co-director. It was screened in the Contemporary World Cinema section at the 2014 Toronto International Film Festival. It was screened in the Panorama section of the 65th Berlin International Film Festival in February 2015. The film was nominated for the 2015 Nordic Council Film Prize.

== Cast ==
- Ole Giæver as Martin
- Trond Peter Stamsø Munch as Far
- Marte Magnusdotter Solem as Signe
- Rebekka Nystabakk as Helle
- Sivert Giæver Solem as Karsten
