= Emilie Blichfeldt =

Norwegian film director and screenwriter

Emilie Kirstine Blichfeldt
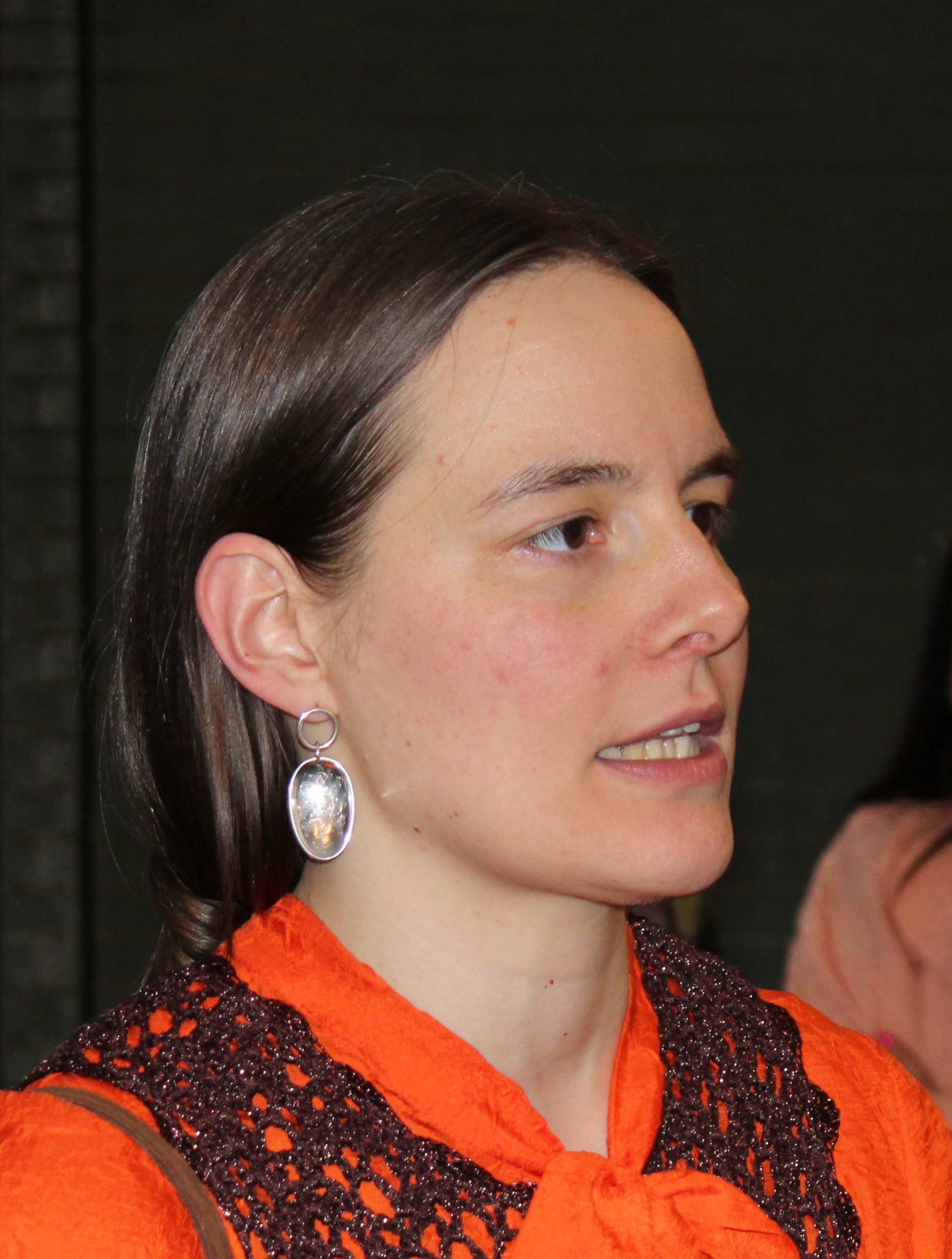
- Blichfeldt in 2025
- Born: 1991 (age 34–35); Norway
- Education: Norwegian Film and Television School
- Occupations: Film director Screenwriter
- Years active: 2013-present
- Known for: The Ugly Stepsister

Emilie Kirstine Blichfeldt (born 1991) is a Norwegian film director and screenwriter.

Blichfeldt graduated from the Norwegian Film and Television School in 2018. Her graduation film, Saras intime betroelser (in English, Sara's Intimate Secrets or Confessions), screened at the Locarno Film Festival.

Her feature film debut, The Ugly Stepsister (Den stygge stesøsteren), was released in Norway in February 2025 and screened at South by Southwest (SXSW) film festival in the US in March 2025. Following its international success at SXSW, the film was sold to distributors in numerous countries.

== Filmography ==
- 2013: How Do You Like My Hair (short film)
- 2018: Saras intime betroelser (Sara's Intimate Confessions) (short film)
- 2025: The Ugly Stepsister
