= Let the River Flow =

2023 Norwegian historical drama film

- English-language promotional poster
- Northern Sami: Ellos eatnu
- Norwegian: La elva leve
- Directed by: Ole Giæver
- Written by: Ole Giæver
- Starring: Ella Marie Hætta Isaksen; Gard Emil Elvenes; Marie Kvernmo
- Cinematography: Marius Matzow Gulbrandsen
- Music by: Ola Fløttum; Pessi Levanto
- Release dates: 3 February 2023 (Norway); 12 May 2023 (Sweden)
- Country: Norway
- Languages: Norwegian; Northern Sámi

Let the River Flow (Northern Sami: Ellos eatnu; Norwegian: La elva leve) is a 2023 Norwegian historical drama film written and directed by Ole Giæver. Set in 1979, it is inspired by the events of the Alta conflict. The lead role was played by Ella Marie Hætta Isaksen, in her screen debut. It premiered in Masi, Norway on 13 January 2023 before a theatrical release in Norway on 3 February 2023. It premiered in Swedish theaters on 12 May 2023. The film received generally positive reviews from critics. It won the Audience Dragon Award for Best Nordic Film and the FIPRESCI Prize at the Gothenburg Film Festival.

== Plot ==
In 1979, a young Sámi woman named Ester has found a temporary teaching job in Alta. She visits her mother Máret before the move, who lives with her Norwegian husband Stein and their son Thomas. On their television, reporters discuss Sámi opposition to construction of the Alta Hydroelectric Power Station. Ester goes foraging for cloudberries with her grandmother Áhkku, who sings the yoik Ester's deceased father composed for her. Ester has just gotten back in touch with her cousin Mihkkal, who comes to pick her up wearing his gákti. He takes her on a detour to the protest camps at Stilla, where she meets another Sámi protester Risten.

Ester starts her teaching job. She hides her Sámi heritage, laughs at anti-Sámi jokes, and remarks that the dam construction should go ahead despite their protests. As her colleague Gøran flirts with her outside the bar, they are approached by a Sámi man. Ester pretends not to know him, and the man is harassed and assaulted for not speaking Norwegian. Ester returns to the Stilla camp with Mihkkal, where she learns about non-violent resistance. An altercation ensues between protesters and local residents who are in favor of the dam,

Ester witnesses the social exclusion her Sámi student Ailu experiences, and goes home to look for her gákti. Her grandmother alters it for her. She puts it on for the first time since her confirmation and goes to the shed, where she reminisces about her father and cries. Máret wants to tear it down, as it brings up unhappy memories. Máret explains that they both went to residential school, where they were punished for speaking their native language. She says there is no future in Sámi, as the battle was lost long ago. Ester goes with the Sámi Action Group to Oslo, where they set up camp and begin a hunger strike in protest of the dam's construction. Ester collapses on the fifth day of the hunger strike, and is taken to the hospital. When Mihkkal sees she has broken her fast, he gets upset and leaves. The government agrees to halt construction until a new debate can be held in parliament; the Sámi Action Group considers this a victory.

At Christmas, Ester gets into a dispute with Stein about if the dam's construction will truly be halted. Ester gives Thomas her father's Four Winds hat, while Máret becomes visibly uncomfortable. Ester later gets into a fight with her mother, who she accuses of throwing away the hat. Ester declares that this is no longer her home, and leaves. At a meeting, she and members of the Sámi group hear on the radio that parliament has voted for dam construction to continue.

After the meeting, Mihkkal tells Ester she should listen as well as speak up. He gives her his car key and Sámi flag. Ester knocks on doors and canvasses for people to attend the protest, and meets a mother whose children are harassed in school for wearing Sámi clothes. Ester finds Mihkkal dead by suicide. At the funeral, Máret shows up in traditional clothes and sits next to Ester. They make amends and Ester goes home with her and Áhkku. Stein expresses his support for her civil disobedience efforts, and Ester returns to the protest camp. She is initially disappointed in the turnout, but more arrive in support, including the young mother she canvassed earlier. The police come to clear them from the road. An officer removes Mihkkal's Sámi flag, and Ester tackles him trying to get it back. She is dragged away by police.

Some time in the future, Ester drives Ailu home from school and meets his father. Ailu wants to show her his room, and asks if she can sing, as his mother used to yoik. She initially says she doesn't know any, but then says she knows one. She begins to sing Mihkkal's yoik.

== Cast ==
- Ella Marie Hætta Isaksen as Ester Isaksen: the film's protagonist; a young Sámi woman
- Gard Emil Elvenes as Mihkkal Vars: Ester's maternal cousin; a member of the Sámi Action Group
- Marie Kvernmo as Máret: Ester's mother
- Mary Sarre as Áhkku: Ester's grandmother
- Finn Arve Sørbøe as Stein: Máret's Norwegian husband and Thomas' father
- William Sigvaldsen as Thomas: Ester's half-brother; son of Máret and Stein
- Sofia Jannok as Risten Labba: a member of the Sámi Action Group
- Niillas Beaska as Piera Aslaksen: a member of the Sámi Action Group
- Ivar Beddari as Gøran: Ester's colleague with anti-Sámi beliefs
- Maria Bock as the principal at Ester's school
- Robert Amadeus Gaup Mienna as Ailu: a young Sámi student in Ester's class
- Mikkel Gaup as Ailu's father

== Production ==
The film tells a fictional story set in 1979, inspired by the events of the Alta conflict. The film was Ella Marie Hætta Isaksen's screen debut. The cinematographer was Marius Matzow Gulbrandsen. The film's score was composed by Ola Fløttum and Pessi Levanto.

== Release ==
The film premiered in Masi, Norway on 13 January 2023. It then opened the Tromsø International Film Festival before being released in theaters on 3 February 2023. The first screening in Sweden was in Jokkmokk on 4 May, followed by a theatrical release in the rest of the country on 12 May.

== Reception ==
A week after its release, it had been seen by 25,521 people in theaters. 31,559 had seen it when accounting for previews. By December 2024, it had been seen 108,550 times during 99 weeks of screenings. The film received praise from Birger Vestmo in NRK. It received 4/5 stars from Wanda Bendjelloul in Dagens Nyheter. It won the Audience Dragon Award for Best Nordic Film and the FIPRESCI Prize at the Gothenburg Film Festival.
