= Fatsani: A Tale of Survival =

2020 Malawian film by Gift Sukez Sukai

- Poster
- Directed by: Gift Sukez Sukali
- Starring: Hannah Sukali
- Release date: 31 January 2020
- Country: Malawi
- Languages: English; Nyanja

Fatsani: A Tale of Survival is a 2020 Malawian drama film directed by Gift Sukez Sukali. It follows the life of a young girl Fatsani who is forced to sell bananas in the streets after her school is closed due to sanitation issues. It was selected as the Malawian entry for the Best International Feature Film at the 94th Academy Awards.

== Cast ==
- Kelvin Maxwell Ngoma as Lipenga
- Edwin Chonde as Mr. Mussa
- Hannah Sukali as Fatsani
- Patrick Mhango as Mr. Pilato Chipwanya

== See also ==
- List of submissions to the 94th Academy Awards for Best International Feature Film
- List of Malawian submissions for the Academy Award for Best International Feature Film
