= Vidalia Abarca =

Mexican footballer (born 2001)

Personal information
- Full name: Vidalia Mariana Abarca González
- Date of birth: 13 November 2001 (age 24)
- Place of birth: Iguala de la Independencia, Guerrero, Mexico
- Height: 1.67 m (5 ft 6 in)
- Position: Winger

College career
Years	Team	Apps	(Gls)
2018–2021	Cal State San Bernardino Coyotes	17	(7)

Senior career*
Years	Team	Apps	(Gls)
2022	Monterrey	4	(0)
2022–2023	Pachuca	5	(0)
2023–2025	León	20	(0)
- * Club domestic league appearances and goals as of 4 June 2023 ‡ National team caps and goals as of 12 March 2022

Vidalia Mariana Abarca González (born 13 November 2001) is a Mexican professional footballer who plays as a Winger for Liga MX Femenil side León.

== Club career ==
In 2022, she started her career in Monterrey. The next season, she was transferred to Pachuca. Since 2023, she is part of León.
