= Ole Giæver =

Norwegian film director, screenwriter and actor

- Born: 19 July 1977 (age 49); Tromsø
- Education: Nordland Art and Film College
- Occupations: film director, screenwriter and actor

Ole Giæver (born 19 July 1977 in Tromsø) is a Saami film director, screenwriter and actor from Norway. He was educated at the Nordland Art and Film College in Lofoten and Konstfack in Stockholm. His debut feature film was The Mountain, released 2011. His second feature was Out of Nature in which he also played the leading role, for which he was awarded The Kanon Award for Best Actor in 2015. His third feature From the Balcony is set to be released in 2017.

== Filmography ==
- Kjærlighetsunivers her hvor de møtes - 2002, short film
- The Pledge - 2003, short film
- Tiden er min venn - 2003, short film
- Forspill - 2004, short film
- Testen - 2005, short film
- Blokk B - 2006, short film
- I Tommy - 2007, short film
- Sommerhuset - 2008, featurette
- The Mountain (Fjellet) - 2011
- Out of Nature (Mot naturen) - 2014
- From the Balcony (Fra balkongen) - 2017
- Let the River Flow (Ellos eatnu - La elva leve) - 2023
