= Rahmatou Keïta =

Nigerien film director and journalist

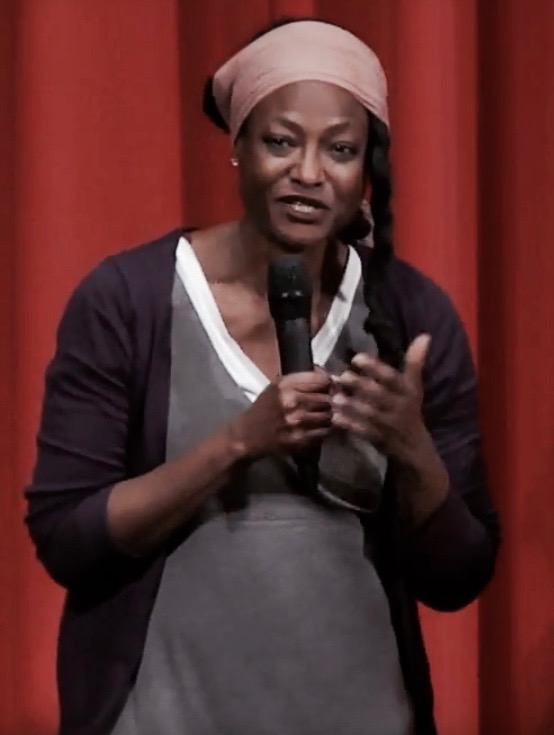
- Born: Niger
- Occupations: Writer, director, journalist
- Notable work: The Wedding Ring
- Children: Magaajyia Silberfeld

Rahmatou Keïta is a Nigerien journalist, writer, and film director, whose film career began in 1990. She won the prestigious 7 d'or for L'Assiette anglaise (2005) and the Sojourner Truth Award for Al'lèèssi…, her first feature film.

== Life and career ==
Born in Niger, Rahmatou Keïta is a descendant of Sundiata Keïta. She has remarked that she embodies the true essence of the Sahelian countries, being of Fulani, Songhai and Mandingo ancestry.

After studying philosophy and linguistics in Paris, she started her career in France. Before becoming a movie director, she made a name for herself as a journalist for European TV channels. She appeared on the cultural programme L'Assiette anglaise on France 2.

She directs short films and created the TV series Femmes d'Afrique (Women from Africa) (26 x 26 minutes episodes – 1993–1997), which screened on national channels in Africa. With friends, Keïta started Sonrhay Empire Productions to produce films "off the beaten track". In 2005, her first feature film, Al'lèèssi..., about pioneers of African cinema such as Zalika Souley, was selected at Cannes Film Festival and won the Sojourner Truth Award. Al'lèèssi… received several awards, including Best Documentary Award at Montreal and at the FIFAI.

A committed activist for African causes, Keïta is a founding member of the Panafrican Association for Culture (ASPAC) and takes an active part in the dialogue of cultures and civilisations. In 2016, her film Zin'naariyâ! (The Wedding Ring) was released.

Her daughter Magaajyia Silberfeld is an actress and director.

== Filmography ==
=== Feature films ===
Year	Title	Notes
2017	I had this dream	
2016	The Wedding Ring	
2014	The Golden Ring	
2004	Al'lèèssi…	Best Documentary Award (Montreal)
2001	All about psychanalysts	
1999	Just because of a shot !	
1990	Djassaree	

=== Television ===
Year	Title	Director
1993–1997	Femmes d'Afrique	
