= The Road to Sunrise =

2017 Malawian film by Shemu Joyah

- Film poster
- Directed by: Shemu Joyah
- Written by: Shemu Joyah
- Starring: Tapiwa Gwaza
- Release date: 3 November 2017
- Running time: 145 minutes
- Country: Malawi
- Languages: Chichewa; English

The Road to Sunrise is a 2017 Malawian drama film directed by Shemu Joyah. It was selected as the Malawian entry for the Best Foreign Language Film at the 91st Academy Awards, but it was not nominated. It was the first film to be submitted by Malawi in the Foreign Language Oscar category.

== Cast ==
- Tapiwa Gwaza as Nanawake
- Bright Kabota as Lamba

== See also ==
- List of submissions to the 91st Academy Awards for Best Foreign Language Film
- List of Malawian submissions for the Academy Award for Best Foreign Language Film
