= Iram Haq =

Norwegian actor, film director, model, singer (born 1976)

- Born: January 1, 1976 (age 50)
- Education: Westerdals School of Communication, Oslo
- Occupations: Filmmaker, actress, Director
- Years active: 2002–present
- Known for: What Will People Say, I Am Yours

Iram Haq (born January 1, 1976) is a Pakistani actress, screenwriter and director of Pakistani descent. She is known for her feature films I Am Yours and What Will People Say.

== Early life ==
Haq is of Pakistani descent and studied art direction at Westerdals School of Communication in Oslo. She came from a conservative Muslim family from Pakistan which immigrated to Norway. Her upbringing and life events were later a huge inspiration for her movie What Will People Say.

== Career ==
Haq worked for many years as an actress, appearing in theatre, film and television, including Import-Export. She also wrote and starred in the short film Old Faithfull which was selected for the short film competition at the Venice Film Festival in 2004. She made her directorial debut with the short film, Little Miss Eyeflap which premiered at the Sundance Film Festival in 2010.

Haq's feature film debut, I Am Yours premiered at the Toronto International Film Festival in 2013. It was praised in Variety as "an assured...debut". The film tells the story of a young Pakistani mother living in Norway and has been lauded for its exceptionally naturalistic performances. The film was selected as the official Norwegian Oscar entry for Best Foreign Language Film.

Her next film What Will People Say has been described as a "heartbreaking female personal drama with culture clashes between two different worlds." The film was inspired by Haq's own life experience. This film was the official entry from Norway to the 91st Academy Awards for Best Foreign Language Film.

== Filmography ==
Year	Title	Role	Notes
2002	Borettslaget	Fatima Silmandar	TV series
2002	Jul i Borettslaget	Fatima Silmandar	Video
2004	Trofast		Short film
2005	Import-Export		
2008	Fallen Angels		
2009	Little Miss Eyeflap	Director	
2010	Tomme tønner		
2013	I Am Yours	Director	
2017	What Will People Say	Writer & director	
2020	When the Dust Settles (Når støvet har lagt sig)	Director, 3 episodes	Danish series
