= Shemu Joyah =

Malawian director and producer

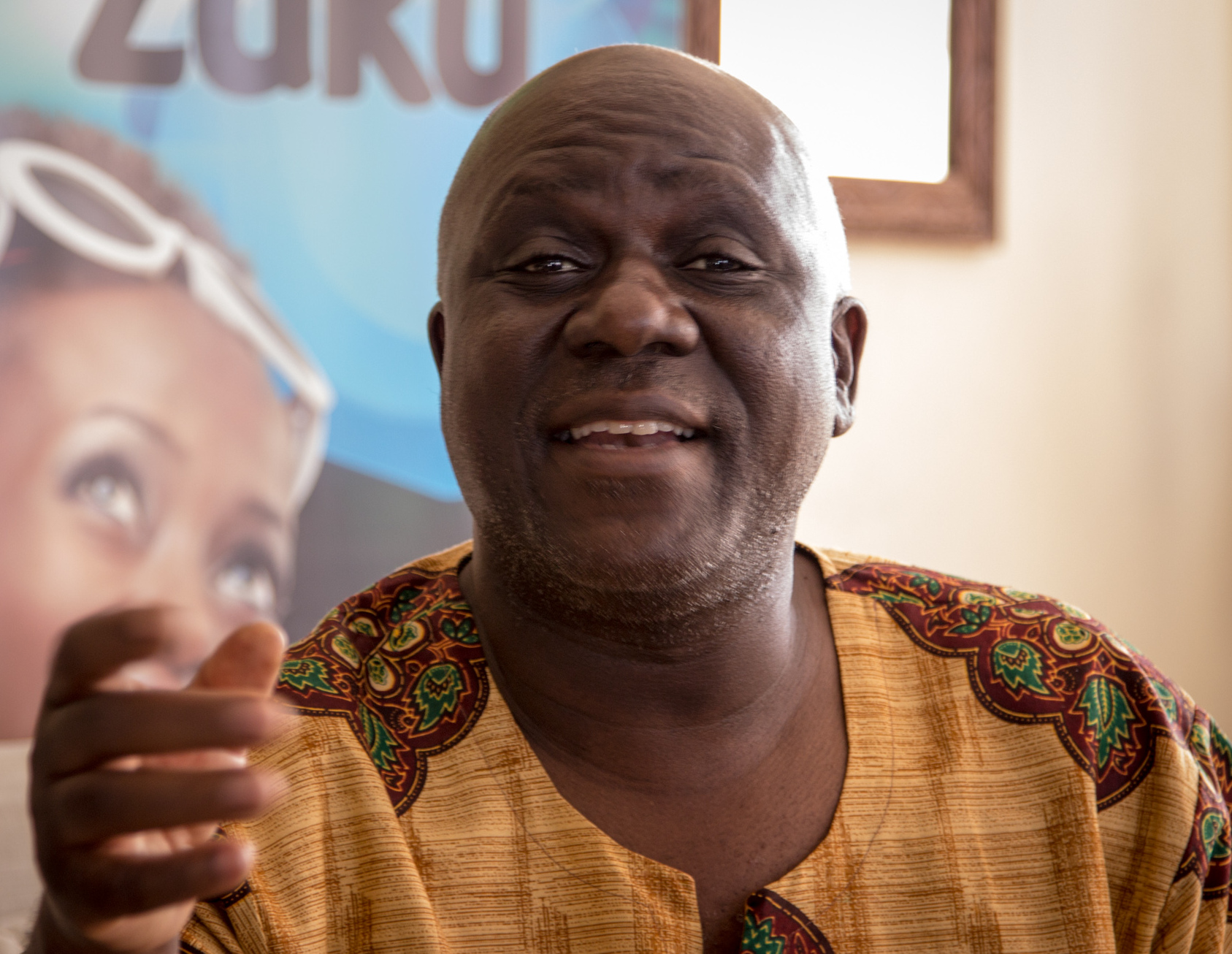
- Shemu Joyah at the 2013 Zanzibar International Film Festival.
- Born: Charles Shemu Joyah; Zimbabwe
- Citizenship: Malawi
- Education: University of Malawi; University of East London
- Occupation: Director
- Notable work: The Road to Sunrise

Charles Shemu Joyah (born 1959) is a producer and director from Malawi. He was born in Zimbabwe. His third movie, The Road to Sunrise, was selected as the Malawian entry for the Best Foreign Language Film at the 91st Academy Awards.

== Personal life ==
Shemu Joyah was born in Zimbabwe to Malawian parents. He later moved back to Malawi and studied for a BSc in Mathematics and Physics at the University of Malawi, Chancellor College. He then proceeded to the United Kingdom for further studies and received a BSc Honours degree in surveying and mapping sciences from the University of East London. Joyah works as a land scientist and real estate consultant in Malawi. He has used the money in his consultancy services to fund many of his artistic projects.

== Film ==
=== Seasons of a life ===
Season of a Life was written, shot, edited and director Shemu Joyah. The movie is internationally acclaimed and has been featured in international film festivals and won seven awards. The film has also been nominated for awards in the Kenya, Cairo, and Zanzibar Film festivals. It is a Malawian court case drama that was filmed on location in Malawi. It is about a domestic worker sexually molested by her employer who struggles to empower herself and improve her life. It was nominated in 8 categories at the 6th Africa Movie Academy Awards, including nominations for Best Screenplay and Best Original Soundtrack. Actress, Tapiwa Gwaza won a Nollywood award for best Performance by a supporting actress.

=== The Last Fishing Boat ===
The movie depicts the life of a fisherman whose livelihood is being transformed by the tourism industry. It shows the dynamics between the traditional way of life and contemporary life.

=== The Road to Sunrise ===
It was selected as the first malawian movie for the Best Foreign Language Film at the 91st Academy Awards, but it was not nominated. It was the first film to be submitted by Malawi in the Foreign Language Oscar category.

== Books ==
- "Danger in the Lake", Heineman African & Caribbean Writers – 1998
- "Rays of Hope", (short story), published in anthology - 1990, (Winner of British Council Arts and Literature competition in Malawi).

== Film timeline ==
- "The Road to Sunrise " - 2017
- "The Last fishing Boat"- 2012
- "Seasons of a Life" – 2009
