= List of countries by number of Academy Awards for Best International Feature Film =

National origin of Academy Award winners and nominees for Best International Feature Film. Won the award or one of its Special/Honorary predecessors Nominated for the award United States (ineligible for competition)

This is a list of countries by number of Academy Awards for Best International Feature Film (known as Best Foreign Language Film before 2020), a table showing the total number of submissions, nominations, and awards in this category received by each country. It follows Academy convention by not grouping the tally of extinct countries with that of their successor states.

As of 2026, at least one film has been submitted by 140 countries. Of this number, 64 countries have received a nomination, (Note: Includes a disqualified nomination for Uruguay. After nominations were announced in 1992, information came to light showing that A Place in the World (1992) was wholly produced in Argentina, and had insufficient Uruguayan artistic control. The film was declared ineligible and removed from the final ballot.) with 31 countries ultimately winning the Oscar.

== Academy Awards for Best International Feature Film tally by country ==
Submitting country	Number of winning films	Number of nominated films	Number of submitted films	First submitted	Last submitted
Italy (Note: Italy's tally includes two Special Awards for Shoe-Shine (1946) and The Bicycle Thief (1948), as well as an Honorary Award shared with France for The Walls of Malapaga (1949).)	14	33	72	1947	2025
France (Note: France's tally includes a Special Award for Monsieur Vincent (1947) as well as two Honorary Awards: one for Forbidden Games (1952) and one shared with Italy for The Walls of Malapaga (1949).)	12	43	73	1948	2025
Japan (Note: Japan's tally includes three Honorary Awards.)	5	18	72	1951	2025
Spain	4	22	68	1956	2025
Denmark	4	15	63	1956	2025
Sweden	3	16	65	1956	2025
Germany (Note: East Germany received its only nomination in 1976, and West Germany was nominated for the last time in 1985. The two countries formally reunited on 3 October 1990. Reunified Germany has received twelve nominations since then, three of which have resulted in a successful win.)	3	14	35	1990	2025
Soviet Union (Note: The Soviet Union, which received all of its nominations for Russian-language films, was nominated for the last time in 1984 and was formally dissolved on 26 December 1991. Russia, Georgia, Estonia, Latvia and Kazakhstan are the only post-Soviet states to have been nominated for the Best Foreign Language Film Award.)	3	9	24	1963	1991
Netherlands	3	7	58	1959	2025
Hungary	2	10	61	1965	2025
Argentina	2	8	52	1961	2025
Czechoslovakia (Note: Czechoslovakia was nominated for the first time in 1965 for a Slovak-language film. Its five other nominations, the last of which occurred in 1991, were received for Czech-language films. The formerly Communist country formally split into the Czech Republic and the Slovak Republic on 1 January 1993. Since then, only the Czech Republic has been able to get nominated in the Foreign Language Film category.)	2	6	23	1964	1991
Switzerland	2	5	53	1961	2025
Austria	2	4	49	1961	2025
Iran	2	3	31	1977	2025
Poland	1	13	57	1963	2025
Mexico	1	9	58	1957	2025
West Germany	1	8	31	1956	1989
Canada	1	7	51	1971	2025
Norway	1	7	47	1957	2025
Russia	1	7	29	1992	2021
Brazil	1	6	55	1960	2025
Algeria	1	5	26	1969	2024
Taiwan	1	3	51	1957	2025
Czech Republic	1	3	32	1994	2025
United Kingdom (Note: The United Kingdom has a very small tally even though it has a prolific film industry. This is due to the fact that the overwhelming majority of British films are in English and are thus ineligible for competition in the Foreign Language Film category. Two of the three British films nominated for the Best Foreign Language Film Award have been Welsh-language films.)	1	3	22	1991	2025
Chile	1	2	30	1990	2025
Bosnia and Herzegovina (Note: Yugoslavia was nominated for the first time in 1958 for an Italian-language film. Its five other nominations, the last of which occurred in 1985, were received for Serbo-Croatian–language films. The formerly Communist country gradually disintegrated at the beginning of the 1990s. North Macedonia and Bosnia and Herzegovina are the only post-Yugoslav states to have been nominated for the Best Foreign Language Film Award.)	1	2	25	1994	2025
South Africa	1	2	20	1989	2025
South Korea	1	1	38	1962	2025
Ivory Coast	1	1	3	1976	2020
Israel	0	10	58	1964	2025
Belgium	0	8	50	1967	2025
(Socialist Federal Republic of Yugoslavia) Yugoslavia	0	6	29	1958	1991
Greece	0	5	45	1957	2025
India	0	3	58	1957	2025
Hong Kong	0	3	44	1959	2025
China	0	2	39	1979	2025
Lebanon	0	2	21	1978	2025
North Macedonia	0	2	21	1994	2025
Palestine (Note: Paradise Now (2005) was initially nominated as a submission from "Palestine" and presented as such on the official Academy website. However, following protests from pro-Israeli groups in the United States, the Academy decided to designate it as a submission from the Palestinian Authority, a move that was decried by the film's director Hany Abu-Assad. During the awards ceremony, the film was eventually announced by presenter Will Smith as a submission from the Palestinian Territories.)	0	2	18	2003	2025
Tunisia	0	2	12	1995	2025
Iceland	0	1	46	1980	2025
Romania	0	1	41	1966	2025
Finland	0	1	39	1973	2025
Colombia	0	1	34	1980	2025
Peru	0	1	32	1967	2025
Uruguay	0	1	25	1992	2025
(Georgia (country)) Georgia	0	1	24	1996	2025
Cuba	0	1	23	1978	2023
Estonia	0	1	23	1992	2025
Vietnam	0	1	22	1993	2025
Kazakhstan	0	1	19	1992	2025
Latvia	0	1	17	1992	2025
Australia	0	1	17	1996	2025
Nepal	0	1	15	1999	2025
Cambodia	0	1	13	1994	2025
Puerto Rico (Note: Although films produced inside the United States are not eligible for consideration for the Best Foreign Language Film Award, those produced in U.S. overseas possessions are. Puerto Rico, an unincorporated territory of the United States, was thus able to receive a nomination for What Happened to Santiago (1989). However, this rule was changed in 2011 barring Puerto Rican submissions.)	0	1	12	1986	2011
(Republic of Ireland) Ireland	0	1	12	2007	2025
Jordan	0	1	9	2008	2025
East Germany	0	1	5	1973	1983
Nicaragua	0	1	3	1982	2010
Bhutan	0	1	4	1999	2025
Mauritania	0	1	1	2014	2014
Portugal	0	0	42	1980	2025
Egypt (Note: From 1966 until 1971, the United Arab Republic made submissions. In 1961, the union between Egypt and Syria was dissolved.)	0	0	39	1958	2025
Philippines	0	0	36	1956	2025
Bulgaria	0	0	36	1971	2025
Venezuela	0	0	35	1977	2025
Croatia	0	0	35	1992	2025
Turkey	0	0	32	1964	2025
Thailand	0	0	32	1984	2025
Serbia	0	0	32	1994	2025
Slovakia	0	0	29	1993	2025
Slovenia	0	0	29	1993	2025
Indonesia	0	0	27	1987	2025
Morocco	0	0	21	1977	2025
Bangladesh	0	0	21	2002	2025
Luxembourg	0	0	20	1997	2025
Singapore	0	0	19	1959	2025
Dominican Republic	0	0	18	1983	2025
Bolivia	0	0	18	1995	2025
Albania	0	0	18	1996	2025
Ukraine	0	0	18	1997	2025
Kyrgyzstan	0	0	18	1998	2025
Lithuania	0	0	18	2006	2025
Armenia	0	0	15	2001	2025
Afghanistan	0	0	14	2002	2019
Costa Rica	0	0	14	2005	2025
Iraq	0	0	14	2005	2025
Pakistan	0	0	13	1959	2024
Ecuador	0	0	13	2000	2025
Montenegro	0	0	12	2013	2025
Panama	0	0	12	2014	2025
Mongolia	0	0	10	2003	2025
Malaysia	0	0	10	2004	2025
Azerbaijan	0	0	10	2007	2025
Kenya	0	0	9	2012	2024
Kosovo	0	0	9	2014	2022
Paraguay	0	0	9	2015	2025
Saudi Arabia	0	0	8	2013	2025
Cameroon	0	0	7	1980	2024
New Zealand	0	0	7	2011	2022
Senegal	0	0	7	2017	2025
Belarus	0	0	5	1994	2020
Guatemala	0	0	4	1994	2022
Tajikistan	0	0	4	1999	2025
Ethiopia	0	0	4	2010	2019
Moldova	0	0	4	2013	2023
Malta	0	0	4	2014	2024
Nigeria	0	0	4	2019	2024
Chad	0	0	3	2002	2021
Greenland	0	0	3	2010	2025
Yemen	0	0	3	2016	2023
Haiti	0	0	3	2017	2025
Honduras	0	0	3	2017	2020
Kuwait	0	0	2	1972	1978
Burkina Faso	0	0	2	1989	2023
Tanzania	0	0	2	2001	2022
Sri Lanka	0	0	2	2003	2009
Malawi	0	0	2	2018	2021
Uzbekistan	0	0	2	2019	2021
Sudan	0	0	2	2020	2023
Uganda	0	0	2	2022	2025
Democratic Republic of the Congo	0	0	1	1997	1997
Fiji	0	0	1	2005	2005
Laos	0	0	1	2017	2017
Mozambique	0	0	1	2017	2017
Syria	0	0	1	2017	2017
Niger	0	0	1	2018	2018
Ghana	0	0	1	2019	2019
Lesotho	0	0	1	2020	2020
Suriname	0	0	1	2020	2020
Somalia	0	0	1	2021	2021
Namibia	0	0	1	2023	2023
Madagascar	0	0	1	2025	2025
Papua New Guinea	0	0	1	2025	2025

=== Notes ===
Submitted films include disqualified entries, except those resubmitted, so as to not count twice.

== Submissions by year ==
Year	Ceremony	Submitted films	Countries submitting for the first time
1956	29th	8	Denmark, France, West Germany, (Note: Presented as West Germany from 1956 to 1989, and as Germany since 1990.) Italy, Japan, Philippines, Spain, Sweden
1957	30th	12	Greece, India, Mexico, Norway, Taiwan
1958	31st	10	United Arab Republic, (Note: Presented as the United Arab Republic from 1958 to 1960, and as Egypt since 1961.) Yugoslavia
1959	32nd	13	Hong Kong, Netherlands, Pakistan, Singapore
1960	33rd	12	Brazil
1961	34th	14	Argentina, Austria, Switzerland
1962	35th	13	South Korea
1963	36th	14	Poland, Soviet Union
1964	37th	18	Czechoslovakia, Israel, Turkey
1965	38th	15	Hungary
1966	39th	19	Romania
1967	40th	16	Belgium, Peru
1968	41st	18	
1969	42nd	24	Algeria
1970	43rd	13	
1971	44th	20	Bulgaria, Canada
1972	45th	22	Kuwait
1973	46th	21	East Germany, Finland
1974	47th	20	
1975	48th	21	
1976	49th	24	Ivory Coast
1977	50th	24	Iran, Morocco, Venezuela
1978	51st	19	Cuba, Lebanon
1979	52nd	23	China
1980	53rd	26	Cameroon, Colombia, Iceland, Portugal
1981	54th	25	
1982	55th	25	Nicaragua
1983	56th	26	Dominican Republic
1984	57th	32	Thailand
1985	58th	30	
1986	59th	32	Puerto Rico
1987	60th	30	Indonesia
1988	61st	31	
1989	62nd	37	Burkina Faso, South Africa
1990	63rd	37	Chile
1991	64th	34	United Kingdom
1992	65th	33	Croatia, Estonia, Kazakhstan, Latvia, Russia, Uruguay
1993	66th	35	Slovakia, Slovenia, Vietnam
1994	67th	46	Belarus, Bosnia and Herzegovina, Cambodia, Czech Republic, Guatemala, Macedonia, (Note: Presented as Macedonia from 1994 to 2019, and as North Macedonia since 2020.) FR Yugoslavia (Note: Presented as FR Yugoslavia from 1994 to 2002, as Serbia and Montenegro from 2003 to 2005, and as Serbia since 2006.)
1995	68th	41	Bolivia, Tunisia
1996	69th	39	Albania, Australia, Georgia
1997	70th	44	Democratic Republic of the Congo, Luxembourg, Ukraine
1998	71st	45	Kyrgyzstan
1999	72nd	47	Bhutan, Nepal, Tajikistan
2000	73rd	46	Ecuador
2001	74th	51	Armenia, Tanzania
2002	75th	56	Afghanistan, Bangladesh, Chad, Palestine
2003	76th	56	Mongolia, Sri Lanka
2004	77th	52	Malaysia
2005	78th	62	Costa Rica, Fiji, Iraq
2006	79th	63	Lithuania
2007	80th	64	Azerbaijan, Ireland
2008	81st	67	Jordan
2009	82nd	67	
2010	83rd	66	Greenland, Ethiopia
2011	84th	65	New Zealand
2012	85th	73	Kenya
2013	86th	76	Moldova, Montenegro, Saudi Arabia
2014	87th	83	Kosovo, Malta, Mauritania, Panama
2015	88th	82	Paraguay
2016	89th	89	Yemen
2017	90th	92	Haiti, Honduras, Laos, Mozambique, Senegal, Syria
2018	91st	89	Niger, Malawi
2019	92nd	94	Ghana, Nigeria, Uzbekistan
2020	93rd	97	Lesotho, Sudan, Suriname
2021	94th	93	Somalia
2022	95th	93	Uganda
2023	96th	92	Namibia
2024	97th	89	
2025	98th	92	Madagascar, Papua New Guinea
2026	99th	101	Cyprus, El Salvador, Rwanda

== See also ==
- Academy Award for Best International Feature Film
- List of Academy Award winners and nominees for Best International Feature Film
- List of Academy Award–winning foreign-language films (in categories other than the International Feature Film category itself)
