= List of Cameroonian submissions for the Academy Award for Best International Feature Film =

List of films

Best International Feature Film submissions from Cameroon

Highlights
- Debut: 1980
- Submissions: 8
- Nominations: none
- Oscar winners: none

Cameroon submitted a film for the Academy Award for Best International Feature Film (Note: The category was previously named the Academy Award for Best Foreign Language Film, but this was changed to the Academy Award for Best International Feature Film in April 2019, after the Academy deemed the word "Foreign" to be outdated.) for the first time in 1980. The award is handed out annually by the United States Academy of Motion Picture Arts and Sciences to a feature-length motion picture produced outside the United States that contains primarily non-English dialogue. It was not created until the 1956 Academy Awards, in which a competitive Academy Award of Merit, known as the Best Foreign Language Film Award, was created for non-English speaking films, and has been given annually since.

As of 2026, Cameroon has submitted eight films, but none of them were nominated.

== Submissions ==
The Academy of Motion Picture Arts and Sciences has invited the film industries of various countries to submit their best film for the Academy Award for Best International Feature Film since 1956. The International Feature Film Committee oversees the process and reviews all the submitted films. Following this, they vote via secret ballot to determine the five nominees for the award.

Below is a list of the films that have been submitted by Cameroon for review by the Academy for the award by year and the respective Academy Awards ceremony.

Year (Ceremony)	Film title used in nomination	Original title	Language(s)	Director	Result
1980 (53rd)	Our Daughter	Notre fille	French	Daniel Kamwa	Not nominated
2016 (89th)	Yahan Ameena Bikti Hai		Hindi	Kumar Raj	Not on the final list
2020 (93rd)	The Fisherman's Diary	The Fisherman's Diary	Cameroonian Pidgin English	Enah Johnscott	Not nominated
2021 (94th)	Hidden Dreams	Rêves cachés	English, French	Ngang Romanus	Not nominated
2022 (95th)	The Planter's Plantation		Cameroonian Pidgin English	Dingha Young Eystein	Not nominated
2023 (96th)	Half Heaven		Cameroonian Pidgin English	Enah Johnscott	Not nominated
2024 (97th)	Kismet		Cameroonian Pidgin English	Ngang Romanus Ntseh	Not nominated
2026 (99th)	Mabanda		Cameroonian Pidgin English	Kang Quintus	Pending

== See also ==
- List of Academy Award winners and nominees for Best Foreign Language Film
- List of Academy Award-winning foreign language films
