= Eystein Young Dingha Junior =

Cameroonian actor, screenwriter and director

- Born: 21 January 1992 (age 34)
- Citizenship: Cameroon
- Education: University of Yaoundé II
- Occupations: Actor, screenwriter and director
- Known for: The Planter’s Plantation

Eystein Young Dingha Junior is a Cameroonian actor, screenwriter and director. He is known for directing The Planter's Plantation, winner of the Ecran d'Or at the 26th edition of the Écrans Noirs Festival in 2022. The film was also Cameroon's entry for Best International Feature Film at the 2023 Academy Awards.

== Birth ==
Eystein Young Dingha was born 21 January 1992 in Njinikom in the Northwest region of Cameroon. His father is from Kom, in the department of Boyo, and his mother from Bali, in the department of Mezam. He did his primary education in the municipality of Njinikom and his secondary education at St. Paul's College in Bamenda. He completed his higher education at the University of Yaoundé II and then left Cameroon to settle in Nigeria.

== Career ==
Dingha began his career as an actor in 2012 and trained at Ruphina's House Academy in Bamenda. His early acting credits in Cameroonian productions include: Samson, Ensomni, The Beast, Cypher Comedy Series, The Kaffi, Ndonne, and My Best Day .

In 2021, he wrote the screenplay for Hidden Dreams, directed by Ngang Romanus for which he received a nomination for Best Screenplay at the Bayelsa Film Festival. The film went on to be Cameroon's submission for Best International Film at the 94th Academy Awards.

In 2022, he released The Planter's Plantation, a musical film that he wrote Produced, directed and starring Nigerian actor Nkem Owoh and the Cameroonian actress Loveline Nimo in the lead roles. In 2022, the film won the Ecran d'Or, the highest distinction at the Écrans Noirs Festival, an annual festival taking place in Yaounde, the capital of Cameroon. He is the first Cameroonian director to win the award in the 26 years of the festival's existence. In October of that year, the film was selected as the country's submission for the Oscar for Best International Film.

In 2022, Dingha directed the documentary Clando, the exile bus (Clando, le bus de l'exil), about the internally displaced people caused by the ongoing Anglophone Crisis in Cameroon. The film is available on Arte.

== Filmography ==
=== As screenwriter ===
- 2021: Hidden Dreams
- 2022: The Planter's Plantation

=== As a director ===
- 2019: Woman Perfect
- 2019: Consort
- 2020: If Only
- 2022: The Planter's Plantation
- 2022: Clando, the exile bus

=== As an actor ===
- 2016: Samba (TV Series)
- 2018: If I Am the President
- 2020: Saving Mbango
- 2020: Full Moon
- 2020: The Journey of the S
- 2022: Behind Gates

== Awards ==
For The Planter's Plantation:

- 2022: Écran d'Or at the Écrans Noirs Festival .
- 2023: Ecobank Ousmane Sembene Special Prize and Burkina International Plan for Girls' Equality Special Award for Combativeness and Innovation for Girls at FESPACO 2023.
- 2023: Best International Film, Uganda Film Festival.
- 2023: Yarha D'Or at the Yarha Film Festival.
- 2023: Best Film at the LFC Awards.
- 2023: Balafon d'Or for best film, best director, best poster, best screenplay, best costume and Golden Awards at the Balafons a of Douala.
- 2024: Best fiction film at the Vues d'Afrique Festival.
