= Night of the Kings =

2020 drama film

- Film poster
- French: La Nuit des rois
- Directed by: Philippe Lacôte
- Written by: Philippe Lacôte
- Produced by: Delphine Jaquet; Yanick Létourneau; Ernest Konan; Yoro Mbaye
- Starring: Koné Bakary; Isaka Sawadogo; Steve Tientcheu; Nubel Felis Yan
- Cinematography: Tobie Marier Robitaille
- Edited by: Aube Foglia
- Music by: Olivier Alary
- Production companies: Banshee Films; Wassakara Productions; Peripheria; Yennenga Production
- Distributed by: Axia Films (Canada)
- Release date: September 6, 2020 (Venice)
- Running time: 93 minutes
- Countries: France; Côte d'Ivoire; Canada; Senegal
- Languages: French; Dyula

Night of the Kings (French: La Nuit des rois) is a 2020 fantasy drama film written and directed by Philippe Lacôte. The film is produced by Delphine Jaquet (Banshee Films, France), Yanick Letourneau (Peripheria, Canada), Ernest Konan (Wassakara Productions, Côte d'Ivoire), and Yoro Mbaye (Yennenga Production, Senegal). It was selected as the Ivorian entry for the Best International Feature Film at the 93rd Academy Awards, making the shortlist of fifteen films. The film is also nominated for Best international film at the Independent Spirit Award 2021.

The cast includes Koné Bakary, Isaka Sawadogo, Steve Tientcheu, Rasmané Ouédraogo, Abdoul Karim Konaté, Laetitia Ky, Nubel Feliz Yan and Denis Lavant.

Announced in 2017 under the working title Zama King, the film premiered at the 77th Venice International Film Festival, with a follow-up screening at the 2020 Toronto International Film Festival where it won the Amplify Voices Award. The film was one of two films featured in the Spotlight section of the 2021 Sundance Film Festival. It won the Black Film Critics Circle Award for Best International Film, the African American Film Critics Association Award for Best Foreign Film and the NAACP Image Awards 2021 for Outstanding International Motion Picture

== Plot ==
At Ivory Coast’s infamous MACA Prison, the inmates are in control and have set up their own set of rules. One of these rules states that if the Dangôro, or inmate King, becomes too ill to govern, he must take his life. The ailing Dangôro Blackbeard is pressured to commit suicide by his subordinate Lass, who seeks to become Dangôro after Blackbeard. Hoping to postpone his death by appeasing the prisoners, Blackbeard says he will name a new Roman, a griot instructed to tell stories for the population during the upcoming red moon. A new prisoner, a thief and member of the "Microbe" gang, arrives at MACA and is assigned to Blackbeard’s cell block. Blackbeard speaks with the new arrival and chooses him as Roman.

Once the red moon rises, the prisoners gather around Roman to hear, and occasionally act out portions of, his story. Initially hesitant, Roman tells the story of the death of Zama King, the leader of the Microbes. During a meal break, Roman is warned in secret that he must keep the story going until morning, or he will be killed. When Roman resumes his story, he tells a highly embellished tale of Zama King’s early life: After the death of his mother, Zama is raised by his father Soni, a blind beggar. Soni becomes the advisor of a local queen after convincing her that he has mystical powers. The story is interrupted by the murder of Koby, one of Blackbeard’s confidants. After a period of mourning, Blackbeard and Half-Mad, his second-in-command, speak to each other privately. Half-Mad asks Blackbeard to name him as the next Dangôro. After Half-Mad leaves, Roman begs Blackbeard to call off the storytelling tradition. However, Blackbeard refuses and says that he wants to spill blood one last time. Afterwards, Blackbeard accepts his fate and drowns himself in a water tank.

Roman continues his story: After failing to lead the queen to victory in a war against her brother, Soni disguises himself and flees with Zama, settling in the Lawless Quarter slum of Abidjan. Following the post-election crisis and the arrest of Laurent Gbagbo, Zama becomes a close ally of the new government and founds the Microbes. Later, Zama is surrounded by an angry mob and is killed via necklacing, thus ending the story.

Realizing that morning has not yet come, Roman claims that the story has a twist ending, and attempts to explain that Zama was a foundling. Half-Mad accuses Roman of stalling and prepares to kill him. However, Roman is saved when a fight breaks out between Lass, Half-Mad, and their supporters. In order to prevent the brawl from escalating, prison Warden Nivaquine fires into the crowd with a handgun, killing several prisoners, including Half-Mad. In the prison courtyard, Roman watches the sun rise.

== Release ==
Neon acquired the US rights to the film in September 2020.

Night of the Kings was released in the US in theaters and in virtual cinemas on February 26, 2021, and on video on demand on March 5, 2021. The film was released in Canada on March 12, 2021.

== Critical reception ==
The review aggregator website Rotten Tomatoes assigns the film a 96% fresh rating based on 104 reviews. Its critical consensus reads, "A restless and riveting fable, Night of Kings sees writer-director Philippe Lacôte in full command of his craft."

Metacritic assigns Night of the Kings an average score of 83 out of 100 based on 21 reviews, indicating "critical acclaim".

It was awarded the Youth Jury Award at the 50th edition of the International Film Festival Rotterdam.

The film was nominated for Tiantan Awards at 11th Beijing International Film Festival, to be held from 21 to 29 September 2021.

It was a Canadian Screen Award nominee for Best Picture, and Aube Foglia was nominated for Best Editing, at the 10th Canadian Screen Awards in 2022.

== See also ==
- List of submissions to the 93rd Academy Awards for Best International Feature Film
- List of Ivorian submissions for the Academy Award for Best International Feature Film
