= Machérie Ekwa Bahango =

Congolese filmmaker

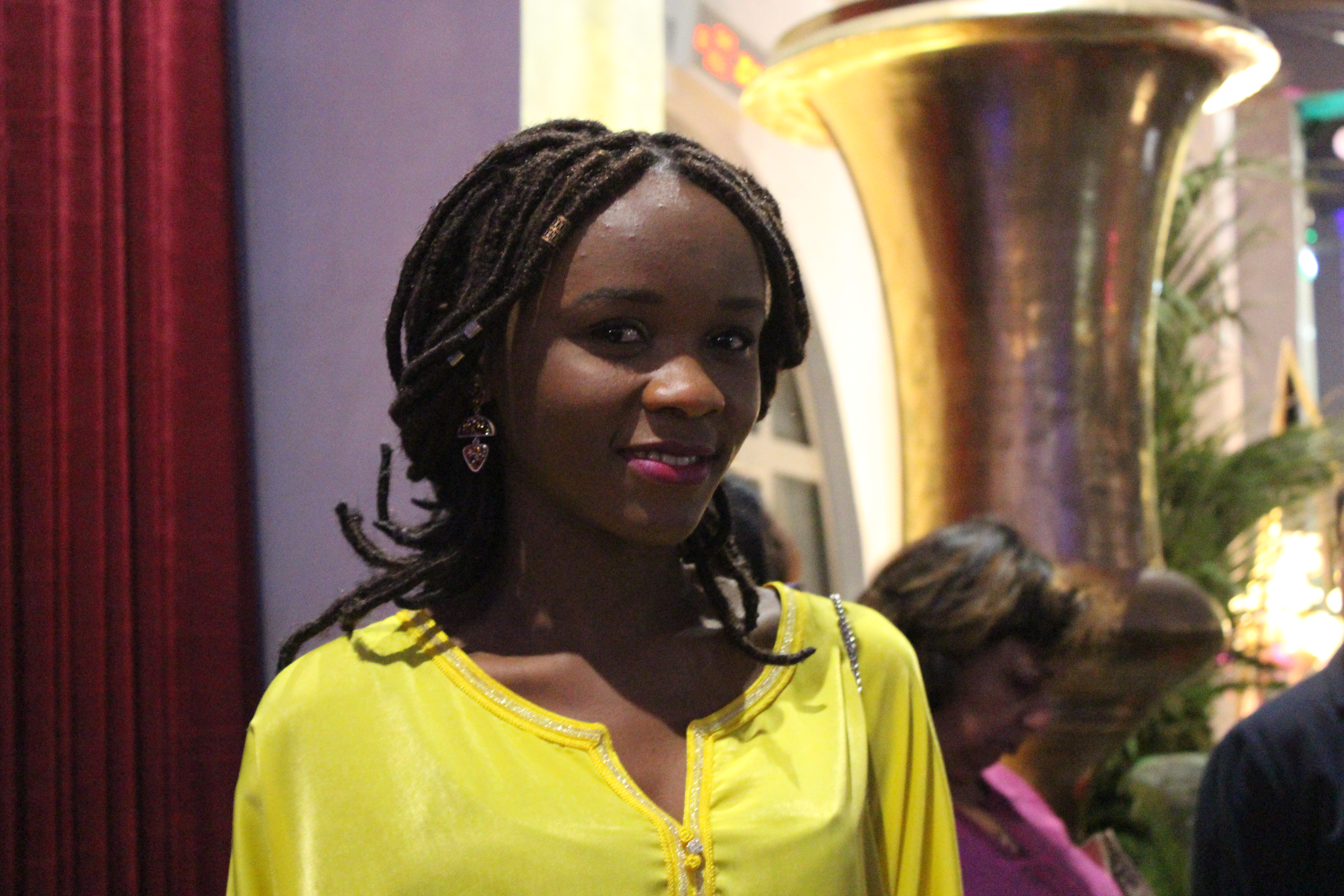
- Machérie Ekwa Bahango at the Carthage Film Festival
- Born: Kisangani, Tshopo provence, Democratic Republic of the Congo
- Education: Protestant University
- Occupation: Film director
- Years active: 2014-present

Machérie Ekwa Bahangois a filmmaker from the Democratic Republic of the Congo. Her first feature film Maki’la premiered at the Berlinale 2018. Her movie Sema advocated for women's rights and thematised the issue of sexual violence. It won an award as "Best International Film" at the DC Independent Film Festival 2020 in Washington.

== Life ==
Machérie Ekwa Bahango was born in Kisangani. After school she went to university and received a degree in law at the Protestant University in the Congo. As a student she participated in workshops for screenplay and film production.

== Career ==
In 2014 Congolese film production company Labson Bizizi Ciné-Kongo hired Machérie Ekwa Bahango as a production manager and as an interviewer.

In 2016 she was a screenwriter for the French language TV series Ndakisa. Produced by the NGO Search for Common Ground, Ndakisa was aired on Congolese national television.

In 2015 she translated for Alain Gomis his script for his 2017 film Félicité into her native language Lingala .

Also in 2017 she was invited to the Cannes Film Festival for a round table under the helm of the OIF and the Institut Français. At the end of 2017 she received invitations from the Berlin International Film Festival for the Berlinale Talents.

Her first feature film Mak’ila as was about an orphan forced to fend for herself on the streets of Kinshasa. It was stalled in post-production for lack of funds until Alain Modot, of the International Distribution of Films and Fiction from Africa (DIFFA), gained backing from Orange Studio in Paris. Mak’ila won her the Golden Screen award at the 2018 Écrans Noirs film festival.

Her second feature film told the story of a family during the Second Congo War. It was announced under the title Zaïria in 2019. Yet due to the worldwide COVID-19 pandemic all her projects came then to a halt and contacts to some production partners faded away.

In 2020 the 48-minute film Sema was released. It was based on an idea by Denis Mukwege, winner of the Nobel Peace Prize in 2018.

In 2022 she was among the 20 shortlisted candidates selected by Netflix and UNESCO to take part in the short film competition ‘African Folktales, Reimagined’.

== Filmography ==
Title	Year	Film producer	Writer	Director	Notes
Maki'la	2018	Yes	Yes	Yes	Bahango met with street children of Kinshasa and based the script on what they told her about their lives
Zaïria	2019	Yes	Yes	Yes	Dedicated to the victims of wars in Africa. Unfinished.
Sema (Speak out)	2020	Yes	Yes	Yes	Bahango directed real survivors of sexual violence who re-enacted their fates as written down by themselves
Boyoma	2022	Yes	Yes	Yes	documentary film in development

== See also ==
- Cinema of the Democratic Republic of the Congo
- List of Democratic Republic of the Congo films
- Media of the Democratic Republic of the Congo
- Cinema of Africa
