= List of submissions to the 93rd Academy Awards for Best International Feature Film =

2020 Best International Feature submissions
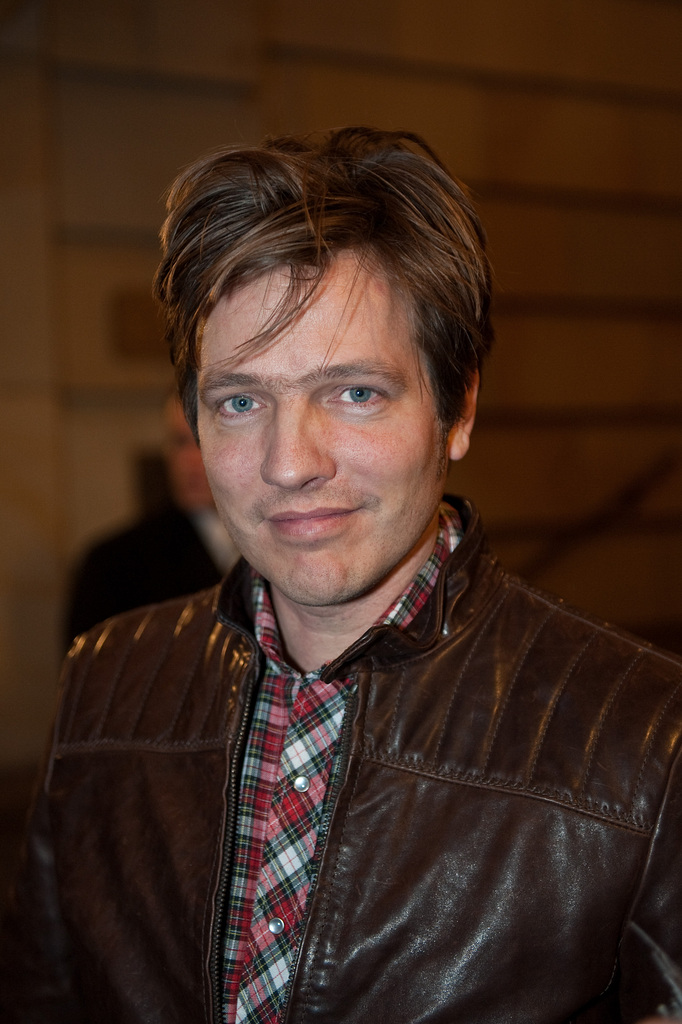
- Thomas Vinterberg directed Another Round, which won the year's award.

Highlights
- Oscar winner: (Denmark) Another Round
- Submissions: 97
- Debuts: 3
- Total eligible: 93

This is a list of submissions to the 93rd Academy Awards for the Best International Feature Film. The Academy of Motion Picture Arts and Sciences (AMPAS) has invited the film industries of various countries to submit their best film for the Academy Award for Best International Feature Film every year since the award was created in 1956. The award is presented annually by the Academy to a feature-length motion picture produced outside the United States that contains primarily non-English dialogue. The International Feature Film Award Committee oversees the process and reviews all the submitted films. The category was previously called the Best Foreign Language Film, but this was changed in April 2019 to Best International Feature Film, after the Academy deemed the word "Foreign" to be outdated.

For the 93rd Academy Awards, the submitted motion pictures must have first been released theatrically in their respective countries between 1 October 2019 and 31 December 2020. The deadline for submissions to the Academy was 1 December 2020. 97 countries submitted films, and 93 were found to be eligible by AMPAS and screened for voters. Lesotho, Sudan, and Suriname submitted films for the first time, while Bhutan made a submission for the first time since 1999; however, the film did not appear on the final list. After the 15-film shortlist was announced on 9 February 2021, extended from the usual ten due to the ongoing COVID-19 pandemic, the five nominees were announced on 15 March 2021.

Denmark won the award for the fourth time with Another Round by Thomas Vinterberg, which was also nominated for Best Director.

== Submissions ==
Submitting country	Film title used in nomination	Original title	Language(s)	Director(s)	Result
Albania	Open Door	Derë e hapur	Albanian, Italian	Florenc Papas	Not nominated
Algeria	Héliopolis	هيليوبوليس	Arabic, French	Djafar Gacem	Withdrawn
Argentina	The Sleepwalkers	Los sonámbulos	Spanish	Paula Hernández	Not nominated
Armenia	Songs of Solomon	Սողոմոնի երգերը	Armenian	Arman Nshanyan	Not nominated
Austria	What We Wanted	Was wir wollten	German, English, Italian	Ulrike Kofler	Not nominated
Bangladesh	Sincerely Yours, Dhaka	ইতি, তোমারই ঢাকা	Bengali	Tanvir Ahsan, Tanim Noor, Saleh Sobhan Auneem, Krishnendu Chattopadhyay, Golam Kibria Farooki, Mir Mukarram Hossain, Nuhash Humayun, Mahmudul Islam, Rahat Rahman, Robiul Alam Robi, and Syed Ahmed Shawki	Not nominated
Belarus	Persian Lessons	Persischstunden	German, French, English, Italian, Persian	Vadim Perelman	Disqualified
Belgium	Working Girls	Filles de joie	French	Frédéric Fonteyne and Anne Paulicevich	Not nominated
Bhutan	Lunana: A Yak in the Classroom	ལུང་ནག་ན	Dzongkha, English	Pawo Choyning Dorji	Disqualified
Bolivia	Chaco		Aymara, South Bolivian Quechua, Spanish	Diego Mondaca	Not nominated
Bosnia and Herzegovina	Quo Vadis, Aida?		Bosnian, Dutch, English, Serbian	Jasmila Žbanić	Nominated
Brazil	Babenco: Tell Me When I Die	Babenco: Alguém Tem que Ouvir o Coração e Dizer Parou	Brazilian Portuguese, Spanish, French, English	Bárbara Paz	Not nominated
Bulgaria	The Father	Бащата	Bulgarian	Kristina Grozeva and Petar Valchanov	Not nominated
Cambodia	Fathers	ដើម្បីកូន	Khmer	Huy Yaleng	Not nominated
Cameroon	The Fisherman's Diary		Cameroonian Pidgin English, English	Enah Johnscott	Not nominated
Canada	14 Days, 12 Nights	14 jours, 12 nuits	French, Vietnamese	Jean-Philippe Duval	Not nominated
Chile	The Mole Agent	El agente topo	Spanish	Maite Alberdi	Made shortlist
China	Leap	夺冠	Mandarin, English, Japanese, Brazilian Portuguese	Peter Chan	Not nominated
Colombia	Forgotten We'll Be	El olvido que seremos	Spanish, Italian, English	Fernando Trueba	Not nominated
Costa Rica	Land of Ashes	Ceniza negra	Spanish	Sofía Quirós Ubeda	Not nominated
Croatia	Extracurricular	Dopunska nastava	Croatian	Ivan-Goran Vitez	Not nominated
Cuba	Looking for Casal	Buscando a Casal	Spanish	Jorge Luis Sánchez	Not nominated
Czech Republic	Charlatan	Šarlatán	Czech, German, Slovak	Agnieszka Holland	Made shortlist
Denmark	Another Round	Druk	Danish, Swedish	Thomas Vinterberg	Won Academy Award
Dominican Republic	A State of Madness	Mis 500 locos	Spanish	Leticia Tonos	Not nominated
Ecuador	Emptiness	Vacío	Mandarin, Spanish, English, Cantonese	Paul Venegas	Not nominated
Egypt	When We're Born	لما بنتولد	Arabic	Tamer Ezzat	Not nominated
Estonia	The Last Ones	Viimeiset / Viimased	Finnish	Veiko Õunpuu	Not nominated
Finland	Tove		Finland Swedish, English, Finnish, French	Zaida Bergroth	Not nominated
France	Two of Us	Deux	French, German	Filippo Meneghetti	Made shortlist
Georgia	Beginning	დასაწყისი	Georgian, English	Dea Kulumbegashvili	Not nominated
Germany	And Tomorrow the Entire World	Und morgen die ganze Welt	German	Julia von Heinz	Not nominated
Greece	Apples	Μήλα	Greek	Christos Nikou	Not nominated
Guatemala	La Llorona		Spanish, Kaqchikel, Ixil	Jayro Bustamante	Made shortlist
Honduras	Days of Light	Días de luz	Spanish, Kʼicheʼ	Gloria Carrión Fonseca, Julio López Fernández, Enrique Medrano, Mauro Borges Mora, Enrique Pérez Him, and Sergio Ramírez	Not nominated
Hong Kong	Better Days	少年的你	Mandarin	Derek Tsang	Nominated
Hungary	Preparations to Be Together for an Unknown Period of Time	Felkészülés meghatározatlan ideig tartó együttlétre	Hungarian, English	Lili Horvát	Not nominated
Iceland	Agnes Joy		Icelandic	Silja Hauksdóttir	Not nominated
India	Jallikattu	ജെല്ലിക്കെട്ട്	Malayalam	Lijo Jose Pellissery	Not nominated
Indonesia	Impetigore	Perempuan Tanah Jahanam	Indonesian, Javanese	Joko Anwar	Not nominated
Iran	Sun Children	خورشید	Persian	Majid Majidi	Made shortlist
Ireland	Arracht		Irish	Tomás Ó Súilleabháin	Not nominated
Israel	Asia	אסיה	Hebrew, Russian	Ruthy Pribar	Not nominated
Italy	Notturno		Arabic, Northern Kurdish	Gianfranco Rosi	Not nominated
Ivory Coast	Night of the Kings	La nuit des rois	Dyula, French, Nouchi	Philippe Lacôte	Made shortlist
Japan	True Mothers	朝が来る	Japanese	Naomi Kawase	Not nominated
Jordan	200 Meters	200 متر	Arabic, Hebrew, English	Ameen Nayfeh	Not nominated
Kazakhstan	The Crying Steppe	Ұлы дала зары / Плач великой степи	Kazakh, Russian	Marina Kunarova	Not nominated
Kenya	The Letter	Barua	Giryama, Swahili, English	Maia Lekow and Chris King	Not nominated
Kosovo	Exile	Exil	German, Albanian	Visar Morina	Not nominated
Kyrgyzstan	Running to the Sky	Жөө Күлүк	Kyrgyz, Russian	Mirlan Abdykalykov	Not nominated
Latvia	Blizzard of Souls	Dvēseļu putenis	Latvian, Russian, Estonian, German, French	Dzintars Dreibergs	Not nominated
Lebanon	Broken Keys	مفاتيح مكسرة / Le dernier piano	Arabic	Jimmy Keyrouz	Not nominated
Lesotho	This Is Not a Burial, It's a Resurrection		Sotho	Lemohang Jeremiah Mosese	Not nominated
Lithuania	Nova Lituania		Lithuanian	Karolis Kaupinis	Not nominated
Luxembourg	River Tales	Cuentos del río	Spanish	Julie Schroell	Not nominated
Malaysia	Roh		Malay	Emir Ezwan	Not nominated
Mexico	I'm No Longer Here	Ya no estoy aquí	Spanish, English, Mandarin	Fernando Frías de la Parra	Made shortlist
Mongolia	Veins of the World	Алтан судал / Die Adern der Welt	Mongolian	Byambasuren Davaa	Not nominated
Montenegro	Breasts	Grudi	Montenegrin	Marija Perović	Not nominated
Morocco	The Unknown Saint	القديس المجهول	Arabic	Alaa Eddine Aljem	Not nominated
Netherlands	Buladó		Papiamento, Dutch	Eché Janga	Not nominated
Nigeria	The Milkmaid		Hausa, Nigerian Fulfulde, Arabic	Desmond Ovbiagele	Not nominated
North Macedonia	Willow	Врба	Macedonian	Milcho Manchevski	Not nominated
Norway	Hope	Håp	Norwegian, Swedish	Maria Sødahl	Made shortlist
Pakistan	Circus of Life	زندگی تماشا	Punjabi, Urdu, English	Sarmad Khoosat	Not nominated
Palestine	Gaza mon amour	غزة حبيبتي	Arabic	Tarzan and Arab Nasser	Not nominated
Panama	Operation Just Cause	Operación Causa Justa	Spanish	Luis Franco Brantley and Luis Pacheco	Not nominated
Paraguay	Killing the Dead	Matar a un muerto	Spanish, Guarani	Hugo Giménez	Not nominated
Peru	Song Without a Name	Canción sin nombre	Ayacucho Quechua, Spanish	Melina León	Not nominated
Philippines	Mindanao		Filipino, Maguindanao	Brillante Mendoza	Not nominated
Poland	Never Gonna Snow Again	Śniegu już nigdy nie będzie	Polish, Russian, French, Vietnamese	Małgorzata Szumowska and Michał Englert	Not nominated
Portugal	Vitalina Varela		Cape Verdean Creole, Portuguese	Pedro Costa	Not nominated
Romania	Collective	Colectiv	Romanian, English	Alexander Nanau	Nominated
Russia	Dear Comrades!	Дорогие товарищи!	Russian	Andrei Konchalovsky	Made shortlist
Saudi Arabia	Scales	سيدة البحر	Arabic	Shahad Ameen	Not nominated
Senegal	Nafi's Father	Baamum Nafi	Pulaar	Mamadou Dia	Not nominated
Serbia	Dara of Jasenovac	Дара из Јасеновца	Serbian, Croatian	Predrag Antonijević	Not nominated
Singapore	Wet Season	热带雨	Mandarin, Singaporean Hokkien, English	Anthony Chen	Not nominated
Slovakia	The Auschwitz Report	Správa	Slovak, Czech, German, Polish, English	Peter Bebjak	Not nominated
Slovenia	Stories from the Chestnut Woods	Zgodbe iz kostanjevih gozdov	Natisone Valley Slovene, Italian, Slovene	Gregor Božič	Not nominated
South Africa	Toorbos		Eastern Cape Afrikaans	Rene van Rooyen	Not nominated
South Korea	The Man Standing Next	남산의 부장들	Korean, English, French, Japanese	Woo Min-ho	Not nominated
Spain	The Endless Trench	La trinchera infinita	Spanish	Jon Garaño, Aitor Arregi Galdos, and Jose Mari Goenaga	Not nominated
Sudan	You Will Die at Twenty	ستموت في العشرين	Arabic	Amjad Abu al-Ala	Not nominated
Suriname	Wiren		Dutch, English, Sarnami Hindustani, Sranan Tongo, Surinamese Sign Language	Ivan Tai-Apin	Not nominated
Sweden	Charter		Swedish, Spanish, English	Amanda Kernell	Not nominated
Switzerland	My Little Sister	Schwesterlein	German, English, French	Stéphanie Chuat and Véronique Reymond	Not nominated
Taiwan	A Sun	陽光普照	Mandarin, Taiwanese Hokkien	Chung Mong-hong	Made shortlist
Thailand	Happy Old Year	ฮาวทูทิ้ง ทิ้งอย่างไร..ไม่ให้เหลือเธอ	Thai	Nawapol Thamrongrattanarit	Not nominated
Tunisia	The Man Who Sold His Skin	الرجل الذي باع ظهره / L'homme qui a vendu sa peau	Arabic, English, French, Flemish	Kaouther Ben Hania	Nominated
Turkey	Miracle in Cell No. 7	7. Koğuştaki Mucize	Turkish	Mehmet Ada Öztekin	Not nominated
Ukraine	Atlantis	Атлантида	Ukrainian	Valentyn Vasyanovych	Not nominated
Uruguay	Alelí		Spanish	Leticia Jorge	Not nominated
Uzbekistan	2000 Songs of Farida	Faridaning ikki ming qoʻshigʻi	Uzbek, Russian	Yalkin Tuychiev	Disqualified
Venezuela	Once Upon a Time in Venezuela	Érase una vez en Venezuela, Congo Mirador	Spanish, English	Anabel Rodríguez Ríos	Not nominated
Vietnam	Dreamy Eyes	Mắt biếc	Vietnamese	Victor Vũ	Not nominated

== Notes ==
- Algeria submitted Héliopolis by Djafar Gacem, but it was withdrawn by the director in consultation with the Algerian selection committee and AMPAS, after the film's national premiere was canceled due to COVID-19. The filmmakers announced their intention to compete the following year and the film was submitted successfully for the 94th Academy Awards.
- Belarus submitted Persian Lessons by Vadim Perelman, but it was disqualified by the Academy in January 2021 after it was determined that Belarus did not exercise "creative control" over the film. The film, an international co-production between Russia, Germany, and Belarus, did not have any Belarusian citizens in key positions.
- In September 2020, the Bhutanese Ministry of Information and Communications announced that the country had submitted Lunana: A Yak in the Classroom by Pawo Choyning Dorji as the country's second-ever Oscar submission. However, AMPAS ruled that the film hadn't been chosen by an approved selection committee. The film was allowed to be re-submitted the following year, where it received Bhutan's first-ever Oscar nomination.
- Canada originally submitted Funny Boy by Deepa Mehta, but it was disqualified for having more than half of its dialogue in English. Canada's selection committee submitted a second film, 14 Days, 12 Nights by Jean-Philippe Duval.
- Nepal announced a shortlist of two films: Aama by Dipendra K. Khanal and Sarita by Sergio Basso but ultimately did not send either film.
- Portugal originally submitted Listen by Ana Rocha de Sousa, but it was disqualified in December 2020 for having more than half of its dialogue in English. Portugal's selection committee submitted a second film, Vitalina Varela by Pedro Costa.
- Uzbekistan submitted 2000 Songs of Farida by Yalkin Tuychiev, but it was disqualified, because the Oscar Committee of Uzbekistan did not submit the film in the appropriate format required by AMPAS. The following year, the film was submitted successfully for the 94th Academy Awards.
- The Oscar Selection Committees for Ghana, Malawi, and Uganda invited local filmmakers to submit films for Oscar consideration, but no films were sent.
