= Yahan Ameena Bikti Hai =

2016 film

- Directed by: Kumar Raj
- Starring: Rekha Rana
- Release date: 2016
- Running time: 78 minutes
- Countries: India; Cameroon
- Language: Hindi

Yahan Ameena Bikti Hai is a 2016 Indian drama film directed by Kumar Raj. The Cameroon-based company MD4 Production had a small role to play in the film. Despite that, it was selected as the Cameroonian entry for the Best Foreign Language Film at the 89th Academy Awards. However, the film was not included on the final list of submissions published by the Academy.

== Cast ==
- Rekha Rana
- Chirag Jani

== See also ==
- List of submissions to the 89th Academy Awards for Best Foreign Language Film
- List of Cameroonian submissions for the Academy Award for Best Foreign Language Film
