= Wiren (film) =

2018 film

- Film poster
- Directed by: Ivan Tai-Apin
- Written by: Ivan Tai-Apin; Sander Coumou
- Starring: Rafe Leysner; Altaafkhan Dhonre; Idi Lemmers; Gaby Treurniet
- Cinematography: Sander Coumou
- Edited by: Sander Coumou
- Distributed by: Dutch FilmWorks
- Release date: 10 December 2018
- Running time: 118 minutes
- Country: Suriname
- Languages: Dutch; English; Sarnami Hindustani; Sranan Tongo; Surinamese Sign Language

Wiren is a 2018 Surinamese drama film directed by Ivan Tai-Apin. It was selected as the Surinamese entry for the Best International Feature Film at the 93rd Academy Awards, but it was not nominated. It was the first time Suriname had made a submission in the category.

== Plot ==
A deaf boy fights against discrimination in Suriname.

== Cast ==
- Rafe Leysner as young Wiren
- Altaafkhan Dhonre as teenage Wiren
- Idi Lemmers as adult Wiren
- Gaby Treurniet as Lily
- Helianthe Redan as Miss Landbrug
- Erwin Emanuels as Lily's Father
- Consuelo Denz as Lawyer Franscisca
- Anthony Frazier as Doctor Young

== See also ==
- List of submissions to the 93rd Academy Awards for Best International Feature Film
- List of Surinamese submissions for the Academy Award for Best International Feature Film
