= Rekha Rana =

Indian model and actress

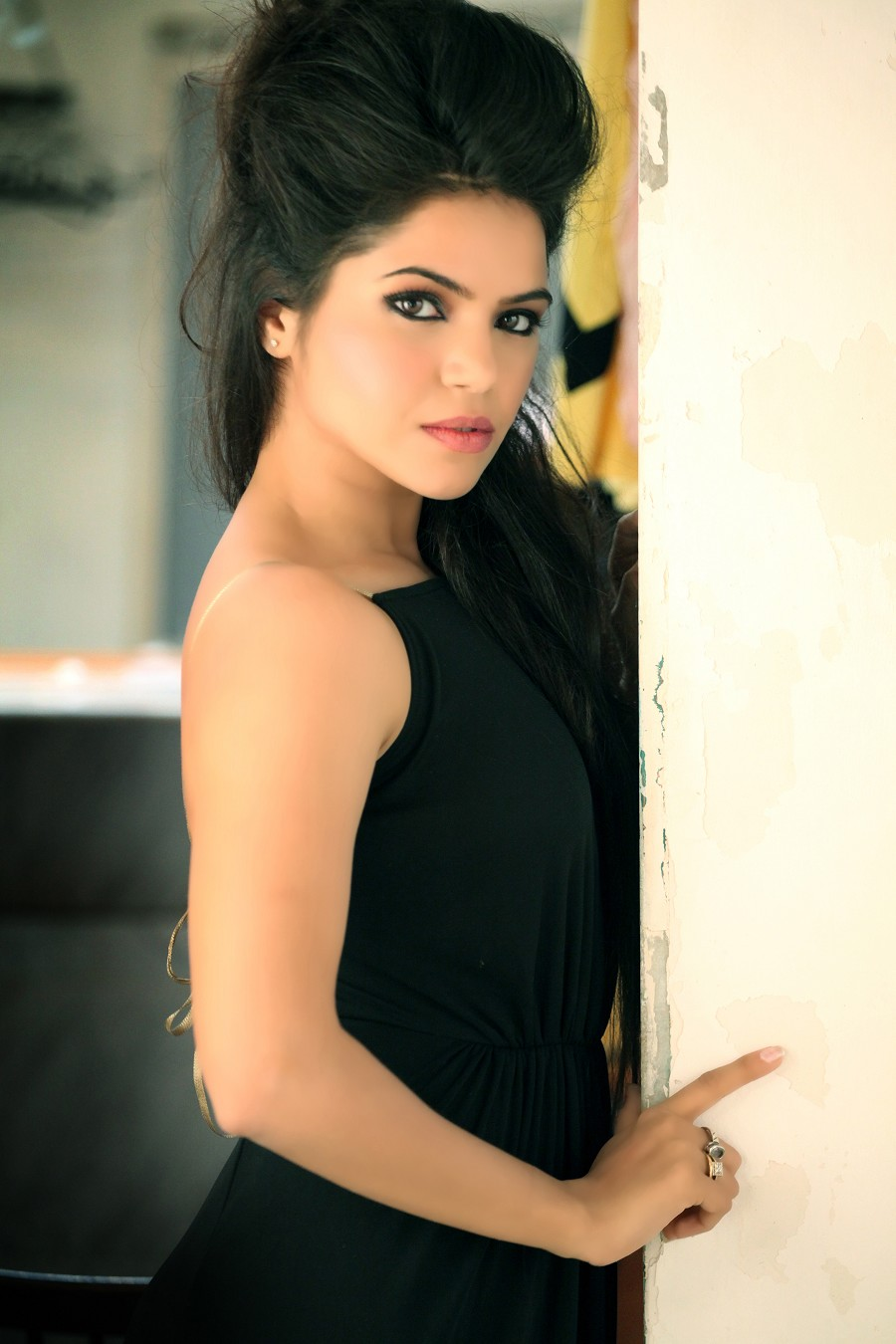
- Born: Rekha Rana; New Delhi, India
- Occupation(s): Actress, Dancer, Model
- Years active: 2011–present
- Website: rekharana.com

Rekha Rana is a Bollywood actress, theater artist, winner of Miss Delhi, Photogenic Face and Beautiful Smile titleholder in 2007. She is the brand ambassador for South African NGO called 'Star NGO' and 'Save Our Women' Campaign. Her first movie Ab Hoga Dharna Unlimited which is themed on Anna Hazare's Dharna released on 13 April 2012.

== Early life ==
Rekha Rana was born in New Delhi, India. She spent her school life in High School Green Field, New Delhi. She participated in cultural activities including dancing, swimming and drama in her school. She joined Barry John Acting School after completed her degree in Delhi College of Arts and Commerce to enhance her passion towards drama.

== Career ==
She won Best Actress Award for her performance in the short film Take Care at Rangs Singapore film festival, 2010. She had been interested in theatre and had participated in many plays as the leading lady including Dinesh Thakur's Jis Lahore Nahi Dekhiya Oh Jameya Nahi. She was signed with the two films produced by Crescendo Productions in lead roles. It is said that she is signed in the Hindi and Tamil versions of I hate Valentine's Day film being directed by Hemant Nilim das. As she is interested in humanitarian work, she has joined women's helmet promotion, started on 8 March 2010 at International Women's Day to make awareness among women wearing helmets.

== Filmography ==
Year	Film	Language	Role	Notes
2012	Ab Hoga Dharna Unlimited	Hindi	Female lead	Released on 13 April 2012
2013	Tara: The Journey of Love and Passion	Hindi	Female lead	Released on 12 July 2013
2016	Yahan Ameena Bikti Hai	Hindi	Female lead	Filming
2014	Cinema Star	Tamil	Supporting lead	Released on 12 January 2015
2024	Ameena	Hindi	Main lead	Released on 11 April 2024
