= List of submissions to the 95th Academy Awards for Best International Feature Film =

2022 Best International Feature submissions
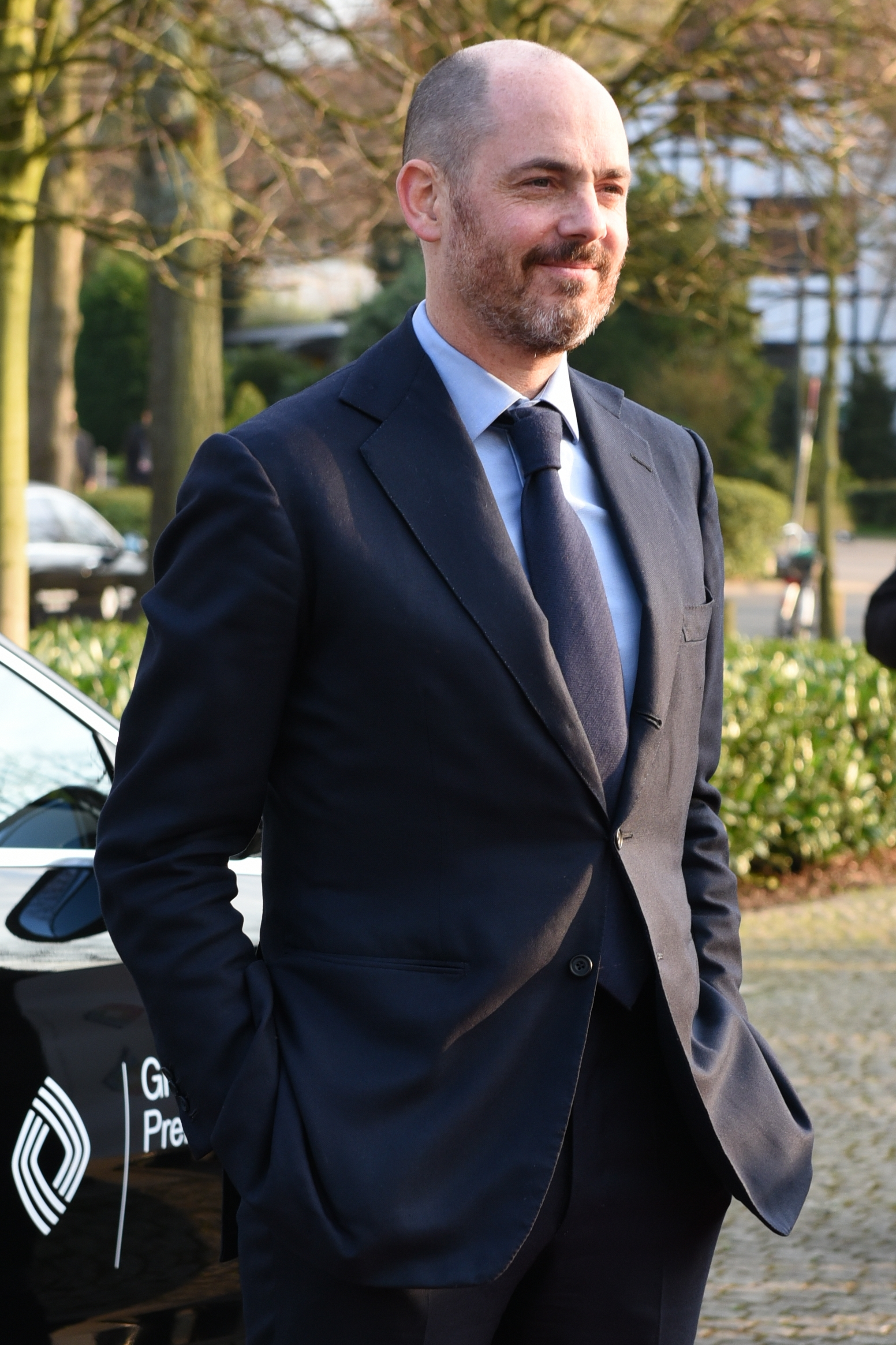
- Edward Berger directed All Quiet on the Western Front, which won the year's award.

Highlights
- Oscar winner: (Germany) All Quiet on the Western Front
- Submissions: 93
- Debuts: 1
- Total eligible: 93

This is a list of submissions to the 95th Academy Awards for the Best International Feature Film. The Academy of Motion Picture Arts and Sciences (AMPAS) has invited the film industries of various countries to submit their best film for the Academy Award for Best International Feature Film every year since the award was created in 1956. The award is presented annually by the Academy to a feature-length motion picture produced outside the United States that contains primarily non-English dialogue. The International Feature Film Award Committee oversees the process and reviews all the submitted films. The category was previously called the Best Foreign Language Film, but this was changed in April 2019 to Best International Feature Film, after the Academy deemed the word "Foreign" to be outdated.

For the 95th Academy Awards, the submitted motion pictures must have first been released theatrically in their respective countries between 1 January 2022 and 30 November 2022. The deadline for submissions to the Academy was 3 October 2022. 93 countries submitted films and were found to be eligible by AMPAS and screened for voters. Uganda submitted a film for the first time, while Tanzania made a submission for the first time since 2001. After the 15-film shortlist was announced on 21 December 2022, the five nominees were announced on 24 January 2023.

Germany won the award for the fourth time with All Quiet on the Western Front by Edward Berger, which also won Best Cinematography, Best Original Score, and Best Production Design, and was also nominated for Best Picture, Best Adapted Screenplay, Best Sound, Best Makeup and Hairstyling and Best Visual Effects.

== Submissions ==
Submitting country	Film title used in nomination	Original title	Language(s)	Director(s)	Result
Albania	A Cup of Coffee and New Shoes On	Një filxhan kafe dhe këpucë të reja veshur	Albanian, Albanian Sign Language	Gentian Koçi	Not nominated
Algeria	Our Brothers	Nos frangins	French, Arabic	Rachid Bouchareb	Not nominated
Argentina	Argentina, 1985		Spanish	Santiago Mitre	Nominated
Armenia	Aurora's Sunrise	Արշալույսի լուսաբացը	Western Armenian, English, Turkish, Northern Kurdish, German	Inna Sahakyan	Not nominated
Australia	You Won't Be Alone	Нема да бидеш сама	Macedonian, Aromanian	Goran Stolevski	Not nominated
Austria	Corsage		German, French, English, Hungarian	Marie Kreutzer	Made shortlist
Azerbaijan	Creators	Yaradanlar	Azerbaijani, Russian	Shamil Aliyev	Not nominated
Bangladesh	Hawa	হাওয়া	Bengali	Mejbaur Rahman Sumon	Not nominated
Belgium	Close		French, Dutch, Flemish	Lukas Dhont	Nominated
Bolivia	Utama		South Bolivian Quechua, Spanish	Alejandro Loayza Grisi	Not nominated
Bosnia and Herzegovina	A Ballad	Balada	Bosnian	Aida Begić	Not nominated
Brazil	Mars One	Marte Um	Brazilian Portuguese	Gabriel Martins	Not nominated
Bulgaria	In the Heart of the Machine	В сърцето на машината	Bulgarian	Martin Makariev	Not nominated
Cambodia	Return to Seoul	Retour à Séoul	French, Korean, English	Davy Chou	Made shortlist
Cameroon	The Planter's Plantation		Cameroonian Pidgin English, Kom, Kenyang, Mankon, Mmen, Kpwe, French	Eystein Young Dingha	Not nominated
Canada	Eternal Spring	長春	Mandarin, English	Jason Loftus	Not nominated
Chile	Blanquita		Spanish	Fernando Guzzoni	Not nominated
China	Nice View	奇迹·笨小孩	Mandarin	Wen Muye	Not nominated
Colombia	The Kings of the World	Los reyes del mundo	Spanish	Laura Mora	Not nominated
Costa Rica	Domingo and the Mist	Domingo y la niebla	Spanish	Ariel Escalante	Not nominated
Croatia	Safe Place	Sigurno mjesto	Croatian	Juraj Lerotić	Not nominated
Czech Republic	Il Boemo		Italian, German, Czech, French	Petr Václav	Not nominated
Denmark	Holy Spider	عنکبوت مقدس	Persian	Ali Abbasi	Made shortlist
Dominican Republic	Bantú Mama		French, Spanish, Wolof	Ivan Herrera	Not nominated
Ecuador	Lo invisible		Spanish, Kichwa, German	Javier Andrade	Not nominated
Estonia	Kalev		Estonian, Russian	Ove Musting	Not nominated
Finland	Girl Picture	Tytöt tytöt tytöt	Finnish, French	Alli Haapasalo	Not nominated
France	Saint Omer		French, Wolof, Italian	Alice Diop	Made shortlist
Georgia	A Long Break	დიდი შესვენება	Georgian	Davit Pirtskhalava	Not nominated
Germany	All Quiet on the Western Front	Im Westen Nichts Neues	German, French, English	Edward Berger	Won Academy Award
Greece	Magnetic Fields	Μαγνητικά Πεδία	Greek	Yorgos Goussis	Not nominated
Guatemala	The Silence of the Mole	El silencio del topo	Spanish	Anaïs Taracena	Not nominated
Hong Kong	Where the Wind Blows	風再起時	Cantonese, Mandarin, English, Shanghainese, Teochew Min, Japanese	Philip Yung	Not nominated
Hungary	Blockade	Blokád	Hungarian, German, Russian	Ádám Tősér	Not nominated
Iceland	Beautiful Beings	Berdreymi	Icelandic	Guðmundur Arnar Guðmundsson	Not nominated
India	Last Film Show	છેલ્લો શો	Gujarati	Pan Nalin	Made shortlist
Indonesia	Missing Home	Ngeri-Ngeri Sedap	Toba Batak, Indonesian, Javanese, Sundanese	Bene Dion Rajagukguk	Not nominated
Iran	World War III	جنگ جهانی سوم	Persian, Iranian Sign Language, German	Houman Seyyedi	Not nominated
Iraq	The Exam	ئەزموون	Central Kurdish	Shawkat Amin Korki	Not nominated
Ireland	The Quiet Girl	An Cailín Ciúin	Munster Irish, English	Colm Bairéad	Nominated
Israel	Cinema Sabaya	סינמה סבאיא	Hebrew, Arabic, English	Orit Fouks Rotem	Not nominated
Italy	Nostalgia		Italian, Neapolitan, Arabic	Mario Martone	Not nominated
Japan	Plan 75		Japanese, Filipino	Chie Hayakawa	Not nominated
Jordan	Farha	فرحة	Arabic, Hebrew, English	Darin J. Sallam	Not nominated
Kazakhstan	Life	Өмір / Жизнь	Russian, Kazakh	Emir Baigazin	Not nominated
Kenya	TeraStorm		Swahili, English	Andrew Kaggia	Not nominated
Kosovo	Looking for Venera	Në kërkim të Venerës	Albanian	Norika Sefa	Not nominated
Kyrgyzstan	Home for Sale	Үй сатылат / Продается дом	Kyrgyz	Taalaibek Kulmendeev	Not nominated
Latvia	January	Janvāris	Latvian, Lithuanian, Russian	Viestur Kairish	Not nominated
Lebanon	Memory Box	دفاتر مايا	French, Arabic, English	Joana Hadjithomas and Khalil Joreige	Not nominated
Lithuania	Pilgrims	Piligrimai	Lithuanian	Laurynas Bareiša	Not nominated
Luxembourg	Icarus	Icare	French	Carlo Vogele	Not nominated
Malta	Carmen		Maltese, English	Valerie Buhagiar	Not on the final list
Mexico	Bardo, False Chronicle of a Handful of Truths	Bardo, falsa crónica de unas cuantas verdades	Spanish, English	Alejandro González Iñárritu	Made shortlist
Moldova	Carbon		Romanian, Russian	Ion Borș	Not nominated
Mongolia	Harvest Moon	Эргэж ирэхгүй намар	Mongolian	Amarsaikhan Baljinnyam	Not nominated
Montenegro	The Elegy of Laurel	Elegija lovora	Serbian, Montenegrin, English, Swedish	Dušan Kasalica	Not nominated
Morocco	The Blue Caftan	أزرق القفطان / Le bleu du caftan	Arabic	Maryam Touzani	Made shortlist
Nepal	Butterfly on the Windowpane	ऐना झ्यालको पुतली	Nepali	Sujit Bidari	Not nominated
Netherlands	Narcosis		Dutch	Martijn de Jong	Not nominated
New Zealand	Muru		Tūhoe Māori, English	Tearepa Kahi	Not nominated
North Macedonia	The Happiest Man in the World	Најсреќниот човек на светот	Bosnian	Teona Strugar Mitevska	Not nominated
Norway	War Sailor	Krigsseileren	Norwegian, German, English	Gunnar Vikene	Not nominated
Pakistan	Joyland	جوائے لینڈ	Punjabi, Urdu, English	Saim Sadiq	Made shortlist
Palestine	Mediterranean Fever	حمى البحر المتوسط	Arabic, Hebrew, English	Maha Haj	Not nominated
Panama	Birthday Boy	Cumpleañero	Spanish	Arturo Montenegro	Not nominated
Paraguay	Eami		Ayoreo	Paz Encina	Not nominated
Peru	Moon Heart	El corazón de la luna	No dialogue	Aldo Salvini	Not nominated
Philippines	On the Job: The Missing 8		Filipino, English	Erik Matti	Not nominated
Poland	EO	IO	Polish, Italian, English, French, Spanish	Jerzy Skolimowski	Nominated
Portugal	Alma Viva		Portuguese, French	Cristèle Alves Meira	Not nominated
Romania	Imaculat		Romanian	Monica Stan and George Chiper-Lillemark	Not nominated
Saudi Arabia	Raven Song	أغنية الغراب	Arabic	Mohamed al-Salman	Not nominated
Senegal	Xalé		Wolof, French	Moussa Sene Absa	Not nominated
Serbia	Darkling	Мрак	Serbian, English, Italian	Dušan Milić	Not nominated
Singapore	Ajoomma	花路阿朱妈	Mandarin, Korean, English	He Shuming	Not nominated
Slovakia	Victim	Obeť / Oběť	Czech, Ukrainian, Russian	Michal Blaško	Not nominated
Slovenia	Orchestra	Orkester	Slovene, German	Matevž Luzar	Not nominated
South Korea	Decision to Leave	헤어질 결심	Korean, Mandarin	Park Chan-wook	Made shortlist
Spain	Alcarràs		Lleida Catalan	Carla Simón	Not nominated
Sweden	Cairo Conspiracy	Boy from Heaven / صبي من الجنة	Arabic	Tarik Saleh	Made shortlist
Switzerland	A Piece of Sky	Drii Winter	Swiss German, German, French, English	Michael Koch	Not nominated
Taiwan	Goddamned Asura	該死的阿修羅	Mandarin	Lou Yi-an	Not nominated
Tanzania	Tug of War	Vuta N'Kuvute	Swahili, English	Amil Shivji	Not nominated
Thailand	One for the Road	วันสุดท้าย..ก่อนบายเธอ	Thai, English	Nattawut Poonpiriya	Not nominated
Tunisia	Under the Fig Trees	تحت الشجرة / Sous les figues	Arabic	Erige Sehiri	Not nominated
Turkey	Kerr		Turkish	Tayfun Pirselimoğlu	Not nominated
Uganda	Tembele		Swahili, Nkore, Luganda, Tooro	Morris Mugisha	Not nominated
Ukraine	Klondike	Клондайк	Ukrainian, Russian, Chechen, Dutch	Maryna Er Gorbach	Not nominated
United Kingdom	Winners	برنده‌ها	Persian	Hassan Nazer	Not nominated
Uruguay	The Employer and the Employee	El empleado y el patrón	Spanish, Uruguayan Portuguese, French	Manolo Nieto	Not nominated
Venezuela	The Box	La caja	Spanish	Lorenzo Vigas	Not nominated
Vietnam	578 Magnum	578: Phát đạn của kẻ điên	Vietnamese	Lương Đình Dũng	Not nominated

== Notes ==
- Bulgaria originally submitted Mother by Zornitsa Sophia in September 2022. After asking the Academy of Motion Picture Arts and Sciences to confirm the film's eligibility, it was rejected for having more than 50% of its dialogue in English. Later the same month, they submitted a second film, In the Heart of the Machine by Martin Makariev.
- Egypt's Oscar Selection Committee announced a shortlist of five films: The Crime by Sherif Arafa, Full Moon by Hadi El Bagoury, Kira & El Gin by Marwan Hamed, 2 Talaat Harb by Magdy Ahmed Ali and Villa 19-B by Ahmad Abdalla, although Ahmed Ali withdrew his film prior to the vote. On 29 September 2022, it was announced that a majority of the committee voted not to send any film and that Egypt would be absent for the first time since 2015; Kira & El Gin obtained the highest number of votes of those who voted for sending a film, however, it was lower than those who selected against sending any submission. Mohamed Hefzy explained, "The committee that made the decision included more than 30 filmmakers, and it is clear that the films presented to them did not live up to their expectations to be nominated for the Oscars."
- Malta submitted Carmen by Valerie Buhagiar, but it was not included on any of the assignment lists sent to Academy members who volunteered to participate in that first round of voting.
- Nigeria's Oscar Selection Committee (NOSC) announced they received three Yoruba-language submissions: Aníkúlápó by Kunle Afolayan, Elesin Oba, The King's Horseman by Biyi Bandele and King of Thieves by Tope Adebayo and Adebayo Tijani. They announced they would not enter because a majority of the committee voted that "no film is eligible"; eight out of the fifteen members considered all the three films as “non-eligible” for submission for Oscar considerations, meanwhile, five voted in favour of Elesin Oba: The King’s Horseman and one voted for each of the remaining two options. Chairperson Chineze Anyaene-Abonyi urged Nigerian filmmakers to become better acquainted with previous Oscar-nominated films in the category "to achieve the needed international recognition and put our films in its acclaimed level of creative discourse." The decision to not select a film sparked criticism and complaints about NOSC processes, leading the Academy's International Feature Film Executive Committee to grant the NOSC an extension until 21 October 2022 to revote and submit a film. The majority of the committee again chose not to send a film, and several committee members resigned in protest.
- Russia's Oscar Committee, headed by Pavel Chukhray, confirmed its intention to submit a film on 23 September 2022. However, on 26 September, the Russian Film Academy announced they would not enter. On 27 September, Chukhray resigned in protest and said he was not consulted about the decision. Nikita Mikhalkov, alluding to the United States' reaction to the 2022 Russian invasion of Ukraine, had previously said, "The way I see it, choosing a film that will represent Russia in a country that, in fact, now denies the existence of Russia, is simply pointless."
- Zambia formed an approved Oscar Selection Committee for the first time. Zambia's Oscar Committee invited filmmakers to submit their films for consideration by 16 September 2022. Their submission was scheduled to be announced on 26 September. This would have been the country's first time competing for the award.
- The Oscar Selection Committees for Ghana, Malaysia and South Africa invited filmmakers to make submissions, but did not end up sending films. South Africa was absent from the competition for the first time since 2007.
