= Black and White in Color =

- Directed by: Jean-Jacques Annaud
- Screenplay by: Georges Conchon
- Story by: Jean-Jacques Annaud
- Produced by: Arthur Cohn; Jacques Perrin; Giorgio Silvagni
- Cinematography: Claude Augostini
- Edited by: Françoise Bonnot
- Music by: Pierre Bachelet
- Production companies: FR3; Reggane Films; Smart Film Produktion; Société Française de Production (SFP); Société Ivoirienne de Cinema
- Distributed by: AMLF (France); Scotia/Cannon (West Germany)
- Release date: 22 September 1976
- Running time: 90 minutes
- Countries: France; Ivory Coast; West Germany; Switzerland
- Language: French

Black and White in Color (French: La Victoire en chantant, then Noirs et Blancs en couleur for the 1977 re-issue) is a 1976 black comedy war film directed by Jean-Jacques Annaud in his directorial debut. The film is set in the African theater of World War I, during the French invasion of the German colony of Kamerun. The film adopts a strong antimilitaristic point of view, and is noteworthy for ridiculing the French side even more harshly than their German counterparts.

The original French title is the first four words (the first line) of the song Le Chant du départ, a French military song.

It won the 1976 Academy Award for Best Foreign Language Film; it was submitted to the Académie de Côte d'Ivoire, resulting in that country's sole Oscar.

== Cast ==
- Jean Carmet as Sergeant Bosselet
- Jacques Dufilho as Paul Rechampot
- Catherine Rouvel as Marinette
- Jacques Spiesser as Hubert Fresnoy
- Maurice Barrier as Caprice
- Peter Berling as Father Jean de la Croix
- Dora Doll as Maryvonne
- Dieter Schidor as Hauptmann Kraft
- Marc Zuber as Indian Major

== Reception ==
John Simon described Black and White in Color as an "absolute gem". Roger Ebert gave Black and White in Color three out of a possible four stars, writing that it was "fun to watch and pointed in its comments on race and colonialism." On review aggregator Rotten Tomatoes, the film holds an approval rating of 100% based on 6 reviews, with an average score of 7.7/10.

== See also ==
- African theatre of World War I
- List of submissions to the 49th Academy Awards for Best Foreign Language Film
- List of Ivorian submissions for the Academy Award for Best Foreign Language Film
