= The Fisherman's Diary =

2020 film

- Film poster
- Directed by: Enah Johnscott
- Written by: Proxy Buh Melvin and Enah Johnscott
- Produced by: Kang Quintus
- Starring: Cosson Chinopoh; Ramsey Nouah; Faith Fidel
- Release date: September 2020
- Running time: 143 minutes
- Country: Cameroon
- Language: Cameroonian Pidgin English

The Fisherman's Diary is a 2020 Cameroonian drama film directed by Enah Johnscott. The film premiered at the 2020 I Will Tell International Film Festival. It was selected as the Cameroonian entry for the Best International Feature Film at the 93rd Academy Awards, but it was not nominated.

== Plot ==
In a far fishing village where educating girls is considered a transgression of tradition, twelve-year-old Ekah wants to attend classes. Inspired by the story of the Pakistani education activist Malala Yousafzai, she learns to read and write on her own, assisting her widower father, Solomon, in earning a living. Solomon does not allow his daughter to attend classes as he believes that women must stay at home preparing for their future as wives, a belief shaped by his bitter experience in the past.

Ekah meets Teacher Bibih, a new appointed teacher in the village school, who recognizes the girl's abilities and potential. She urges Ekah to continue her pursuit of education regardless of the objections from the elders of the village. While visiting the school in secrecy, Ekah is appreciated by some of her peers but ridiculed by other villagers who consider her behavior as a disrespect for their traditions.

As Bibih starts investigating Solomon's attitude towards education of girls, she reveals the reasons why he is so opposed to the girl's schooling. Years ago, Solomon was sympathetic towards his wife's wish to get an education, but some unfortunate events made him link formal education to the ruination of his family. Full of remorse and guilty, Solomon vowed never to send his daughter to study again.

However, the prominent members of the community exert pressure on Solomon to take away Ekah from school forever and make the girl live according to the village tradition. Ekah decides not to give up her opportunity to get an education, as she sees it as the way to have a good future for herself and the other girls in the village. Her persistence starts challenging the views of the villagers, including Bibih, who keeps promoting education of girls. The drama reaches its peak when Solomon has to realize the true cause of his fear of schooling Ekah. Understanding that he prevented his daughter from having opportunities because of his own grief, he makes peace with his daughter and approves her decision to stay in school.

Ekah came back to the schoolroom which symbolizes a change of mind among the villagers of the fishing community. The hope emerges that the future generation of girls will have the opportunity to study without the same obstacles.

== Cast ==
- Cosson Chinopoh as Lucas
- Kang Quintus as Solomon
- Faith Fidel as Ekah
- Ndamo Damarise as Teacher Bibih
- Onyama Laura as Barbara
- Prince Sube Mayorchu as Moustaffa
- Godwill Neba a Sule
- Ramsey Nouah as Anang Joe
- Daphne Njie as Mrs. Anang Joe
- Zoe Elora as Andong
- Nimo Loveline as Senior Ekah
- Godjsz Fungwa as Kum Peter
- Modesta Forkwa as Stella
- Eyong Juzzy as Lizza
- Beatrice Mokake as Senior Anong

== See also ==
- List of submissions to the 93rd Academy Awards for Best International Feature Film
- List of Cameroonian submissions for the Academy Award for Best International Feature Film
