= Ameena (film) =

2024 Indian film

- Official release poster
- Directed by: Kumar Raj
- Screenplay by: Aftab Hasnain; Dr. Prof. Kishan Pawar
- Story by: Aftab Hasnain; Kishan Pawar
- Produced by: Kumar Raj co producer Dharm
- Starring: Rekha Rana; Anant Mahadevan; Utkarsh Kohli; Kumar Raj; Dr. Prof.Kishan Pawar
- Cinematography: David Basu; Dwarika Mishra
- Edited by: Chandrashekhar Prajapati; Ajay Verma; Himadri Bhattacharya; Bhupendra Singh
- Music by: Sujeet Sharma; Praveen Koii; Hitesh Patel; Paresh A Shah; Toofan Musical Group
- Production company: Kumar Raj Productions
- Distributed by: Reliance Entertainment
- Release date: 12 April 2024
- Running time: 107 minutes
- Country: India
- Language: Hindi

Ameena is a 2024 Indian Hindi-language drama action thriller film directed by Kumar Raj and starring Rekha Rana and Anant Mahadevan. The film was released on 12 April 2024, coinciding with Eid.

== Plot ==
Ameena explores the parallel lives of two teenagers from different eras – Ameena from 32 years ago, and Meena, a contemporary young woman. Both characters face similar life challenges, yet their responses diverge significantly. Meena, an actress, portrays Ameena in a play titled "Yahan Ameena Bikti Hai" at Prithvi theatre. The play tells of Ameena and how her parents sell her to an elderly Arab man. Meena, after performing in the play, encounters a similar fate as Ameena.

== Cast ==
- Rekha Rana as Ameena & Meena
- Anant Mahadevan as Aftab Hasnain
- Utkarsh Kohli
- Rekha Rana as Ameena and Meena
- Kumar Raj as Bhupan Joshi
- Dr. Prof.Kishan Pawar as Pawar
- Manu Malkani as Dada Ramchandani
- Sharad Sharma as Ajay Varma
- Nayan Pawar as Seema Vishwash
- Aarti Vazirani as Aarti Vazirani
- Ranjeet Jaiswal as Rajesh Raghwan
- Shivraj Patil as Shivraj Patil

== Production ==
The film was directed by Kumar Raj, with the story and dialogues written by Aftab Hasnain and Dr. Prof. Kishan Pawar. The film was produced by Kumar Raj, while Dharm served as the co-producer. Cinematography was done by David Basu, Dwarika Mishra (Ajay), and editing by Chandrashekhar Prajapati, Ajay Verma, Himadri Bhattacharya and Bhupendra Singh.

== Music ==
Music is composed by Sujeet Sharma, Raaz, Praveen Koii, Hitesh Patel, Paresh A Shah and Toofan Musical Group with the lyrics written by Lali Mishra, Dilip Sharma, Vakeel Qureshi, Praveen Koii, Vishwajeet, Toofan Musical group. Background Score was composed by Ismail Darbar, and Prakash Prabhakar.

== Reception ==
Dhaval Roy from The Times of India rated the film 1/5.

== Themes ==
The film's themes include commentary on justice, societal conventions, the resilience of the human spirit, and the treatment of women.
