= List of Ivorian submissions for the Academy Award for Best International Feature Film =

Best International Feature Film submissions from Ivory Coast

Highlights
- Debut: 1976
- Submissions: 3
- Nominations: 1
- Oscar winners: 1

Ivory Coast submitted a film for the Academy Award for Best International Feature Film (Note: The category was previously named the Academy Award for Best Foreign Language Film, but this was changed to the Academy Award for Best International Feature Film in April 2019, after the Academy deemed the word "Foreign" to be outdated.) for the first time in 1976. The award is handed out annually by the United States Academy of Motion Picture Arts and Sciences to a feature-length motion picture produced outside the United States that contains primarily non-English dialogue. It was not created until the 1956 Academy Awards, in which a competitive Academy Award of Merit, known as the Best Foreign Language Film Award, was created for non-English speaking films, and has been given annually since.

As of 2026, Ivory Coast won once for Black and White in Color (1976).

== Submissions ==
The Academy of Motion Picture Arts and Sciences has invited the film industries of various countries to submit their best film for the Academy Award for Best International Feature Film since 1956. The International Feature Film Committee oversees the process and reviews all the submitted films. Following this, they vote via secret ballot to determine the five nominees for the award.

Black and White in Color (1976), directed by Jean-Jacques Annaud, won the country first and only prize in the category.

Night of the Kings (2020), directed by Philippe Lacôte, advanced to the December shortlists, but was not nominated.

All the films submitted are primary in French. Below is a list of the films that have been submitted by Ivory Coast for review by the Academy for the award by year and the respective Academy Awards ceremony.

Year (Ceremony)	Film title used in nomination	Original title	Language	Director	Result
1976 (49th)	Black and White in Color	Noirs et Blancs en couleur	French	Jean-Jacques Annaud	Won Academy Award
2015 (88th)	Run		French	Philippe Lacôte	Not nominated
2020 (93rd)	Night of the Kings	La Nuit des rois	French, Dyula	Philippe Lacôte	Made shortlist
