= The Planter's Plantation =

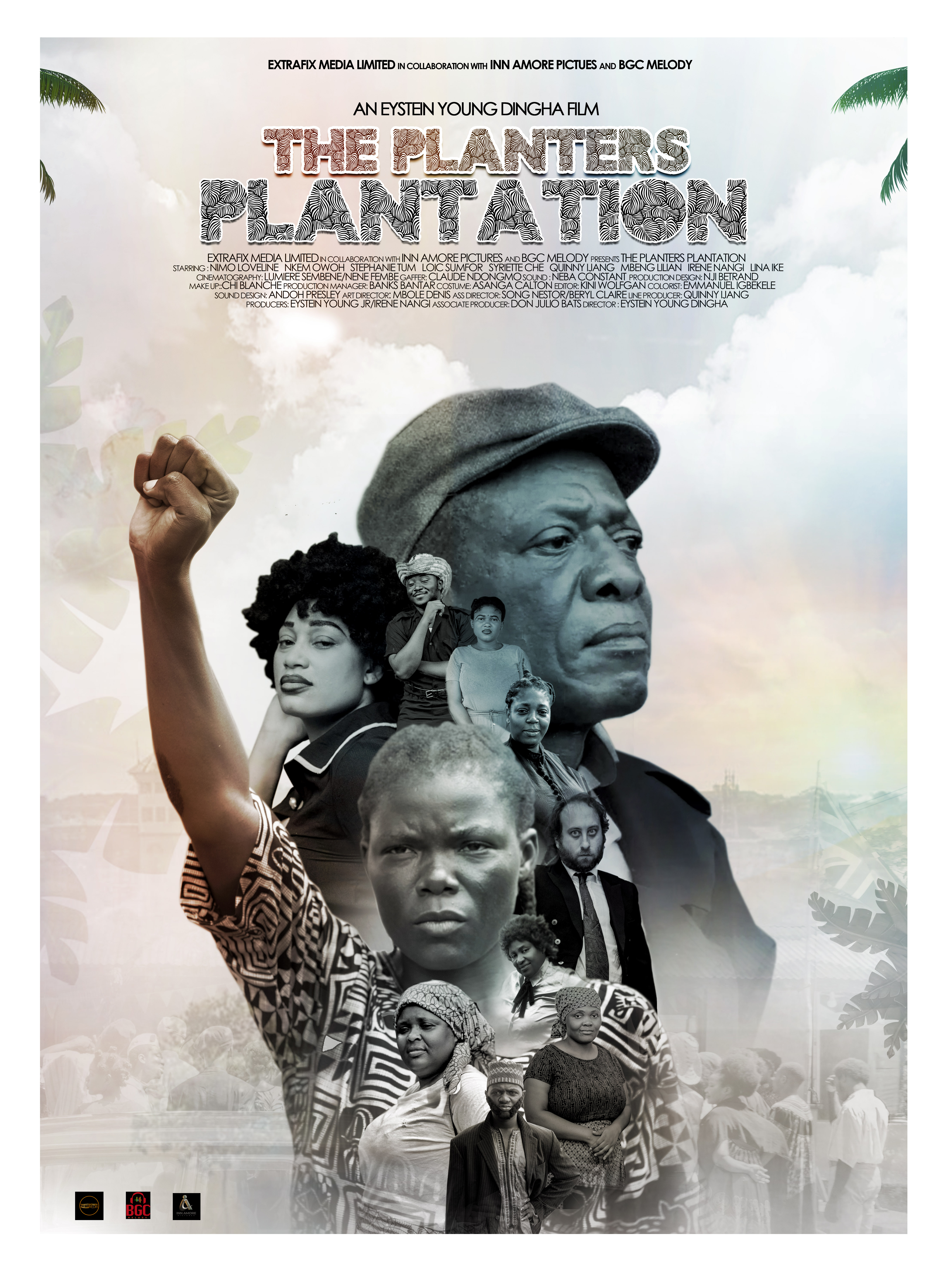
- Film poster
- Directed by: Eystein Young Dingha
- Written by: Eystein Young Dingha; Ijang Quinny(Additional Screenplay)
- Produced by: Eystein Young Dingha; Irene Nangi; Don Julio Bats
- Starring: Nimo Loveline; Nkem Owoh; Stephanie Tum; Loic Sumfor
- Cinematography: Lumiere Sembene; Nene Fembe
- Edited by: Kini Wolfgang; Joshua Tsotso
- Music by: Ayeah Leonette; Ewanga Emmanuel; Godemma Music; Loic Sumfor; Atangche Zita; Eystein Young Dingha
- Production companies: Extrafix Media; BGC Melody; Inn Amore Pictures
- Distributed by: Yema Films Distribution(Theatrical Distribution); Rushlake Media(Inflight Distribution)
- Release date: 7 October 2022
- Running time: 129 minutes
- Countries: Cameroon, US

The Planter's Plantation is a Cameroonian-US co-produced musical drama film written, produced and directed by Eystein Young Dingha It is also produced by Irene Nangi and associated by Nfor Julio Barthson (Don Julio Bats). An allegory to neocolonization, the film was Cameroon's entry for Best International Feature Film at the 2023 Academy Awards.

The film was nominated for top prize at the 2023 FESPACO and took home two awards: Ecobank's Ousmane Sembène Prize and Plan International's Prix Spécial for L'Egalite aux Filles (Special Prize for Equality for Girls). It was the first Cameroon film in 26 years to win the Écrans d'Or, Écrans Noirs Festival's top prize, and made history for being the first Cameroonian film to be nominated for an AMVCA for its best actress Nimo Loveline.

Other festivals at which the film has screened include: the Africa International Film Festival (AFRIFF), .. Festival international de cinéma Vues d'Afrique Québec, Wales African Film Festival, Silicon Valley Film Festival, Festival International du Film de Bruxelles, Khouribga International Film Festival, Uganda Film Festival, Luanda Film Festival, Mashariki Film Festival, NBO Film Festival, Bangui Film Festival(Bangui Fait Son Cinema), Yarha Film Festival, Al Ain Film Festival, Montpellier Film Festival, and Cameroon International Film Festival.

== Synopsis ==
Set in the 1960s, Enanga a young girl goes against all odds to preserve a plantation willed to her father by a member of the colonial government.

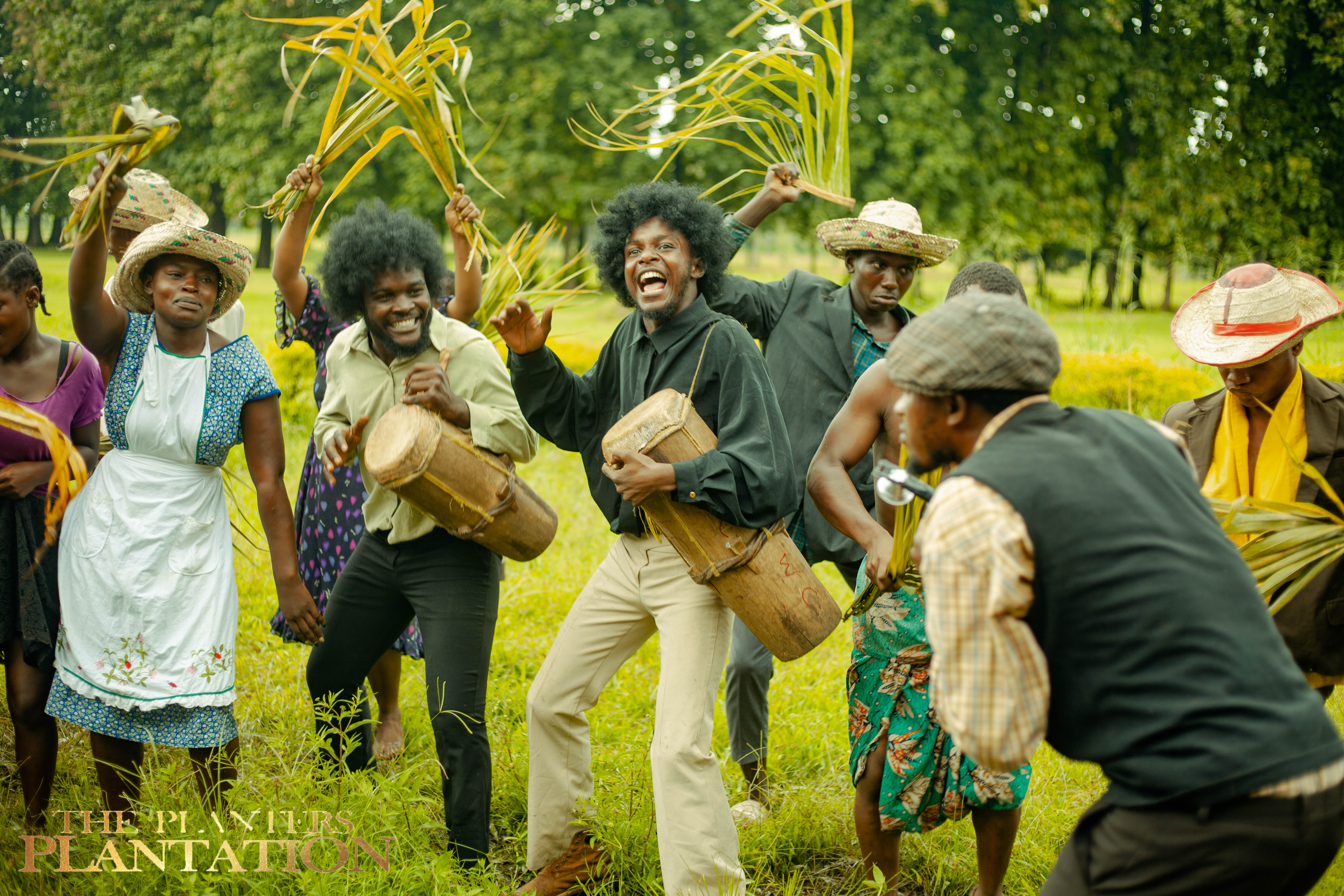

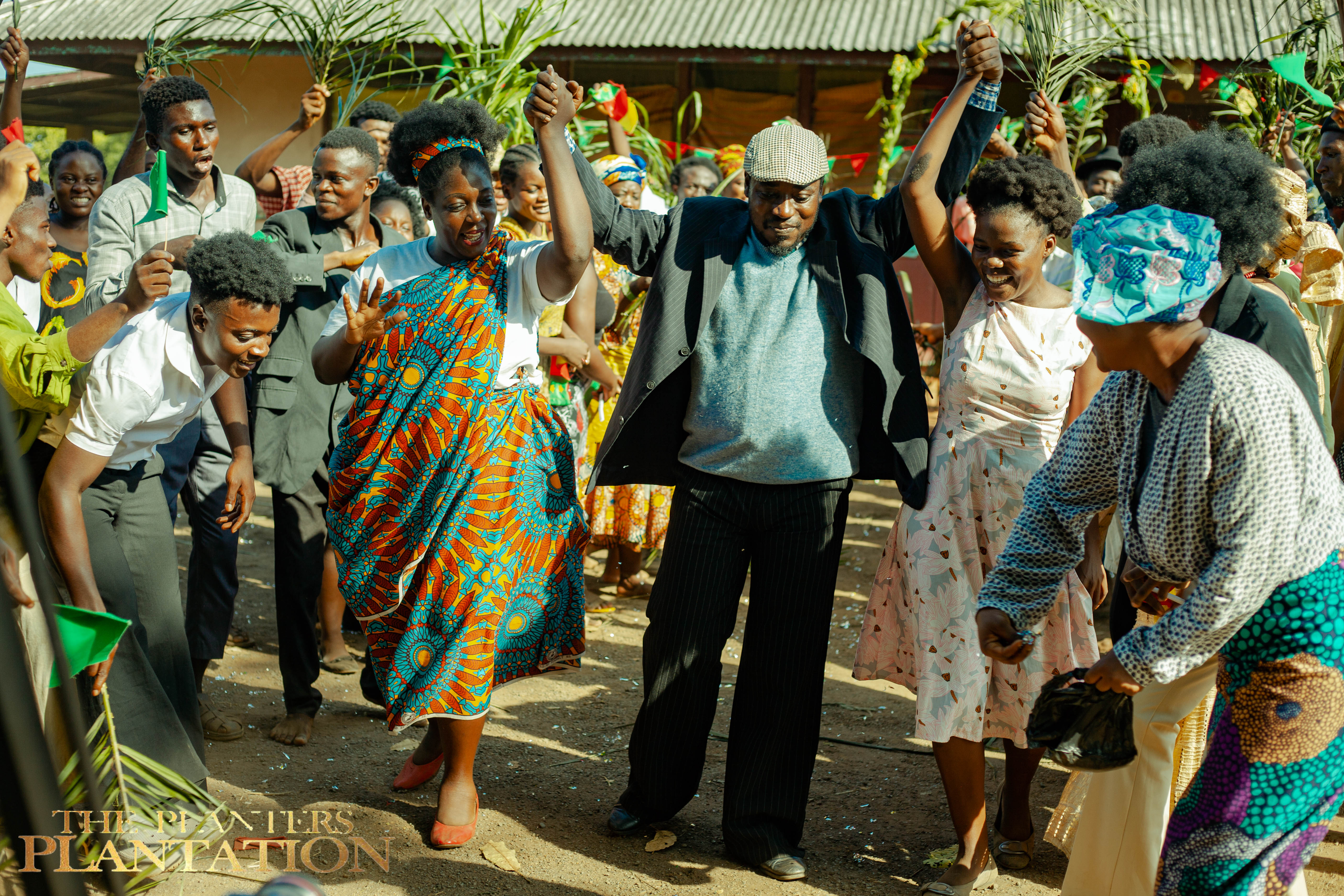

== Cast ==
- Nimo Loveline as Enanga
- Nkem Owoh as Mr. Planter
- Loic Sumfor as Adamu
- Stephanie Tum as Miss Tosangeng
- Quinny Ijang as Mrs Planter
- Syriette Che as Georgiana
- Samson Vugah as Azang
- Lovert Lambe as LItumbe
- Lilian Mbeng as Matilda
- Irene Nangi as Mrs. Asong
- Alexander Powers as James Whittaker

== Awards ==
- The Planter's Plantation was selected as Cameroon's entry for best International Feature Film at the 95th Academy Awards.
- It won the Ecran D’or (first for a Cameroonian movie in 26 years) and two other awards at the Écrans Noirs Festival.
- It also won best actress at the same Écrans Noirs Festival 2022 for its lead Actress Nimo Loveline
- It won Best Lead Actress (Nimo Loveline), Best Makeup (Asanga Calton and Quinny Ijang) and Best Movie at the LFC awards 2022.
- Best Actress at The African International Film Festival for its lead actress Nimo Loveline
- The lead actress Nimo Loveline won Best Overall Actress at the Camiff Festival 2023.
- The movie also won Best Cameroonian movie at the Camiff Festival 2023.
- The lead actress Nimo Loveline made history becoming the first Cameroonian actress to be nominated for an AMVCA at the 9th edition of 2023.
- The lead actress Nimo Loveline also won best female performer at the Khouribga international film festival in Morocco in 2023, making her one of the most decorated Female actresses in Cameroon and the African continent.
