= Jean-Jacques Annaud =

French film director, screenwriter and producer (born 1943)

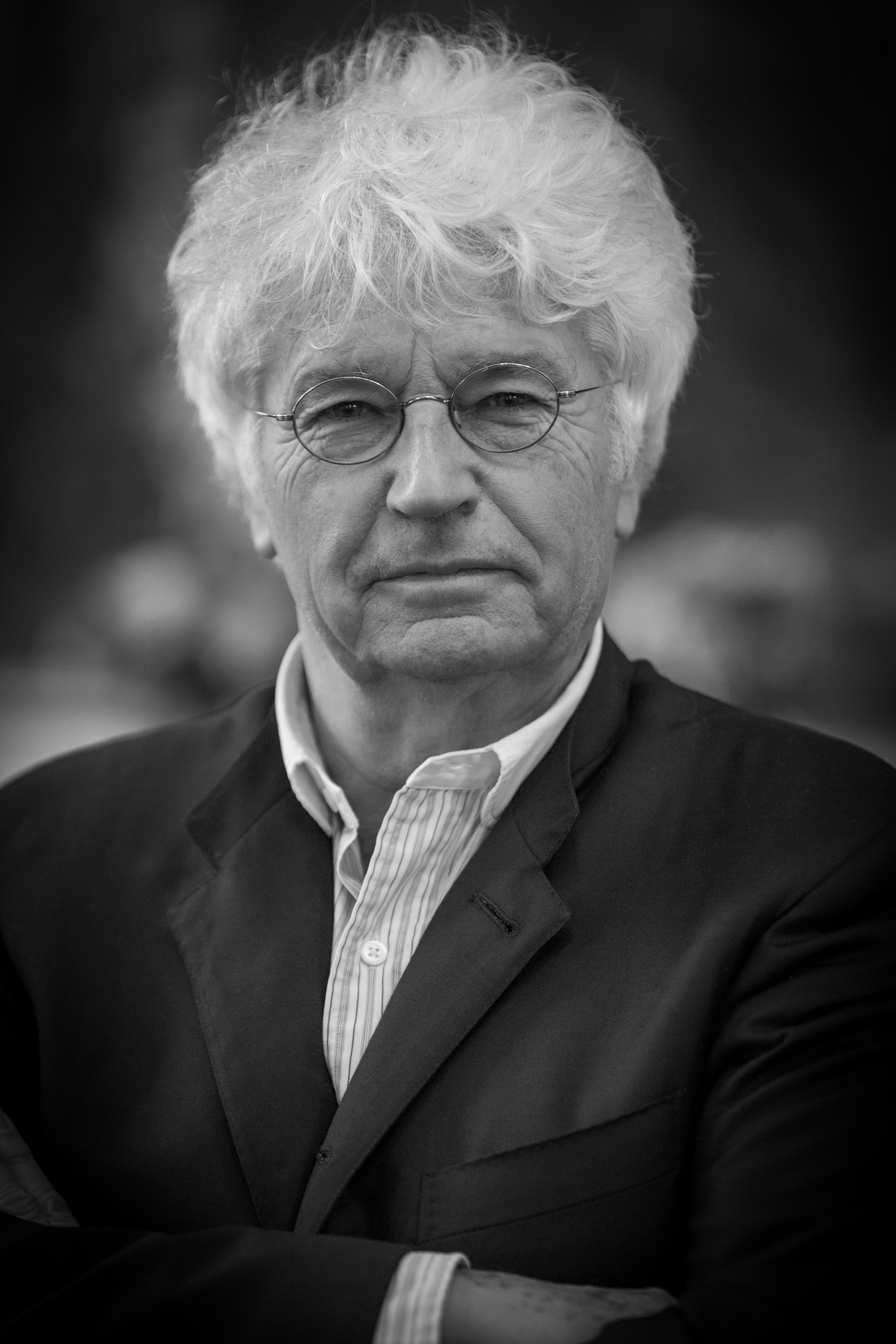
- Jean-Jacques Annaud in 2015
- Born: 1 October 1943 (age 83); Juvisy-sur-Orge, Essonne, France
- Education: Institut des Hautes Études Cinématographiques
- Occupation: Film director • screenwriter • producer
- Years active: 1965–present
- Website: jjannaud.com/en

Jean-Jacques Annaud (French: [ʒɑ̃ ʒak ano]; born 1 October 1943) is a French film director, screenwriter and producer. He directed Black and White in Color (1976), Quest for Fire (1981), The Name of the Rose (1986), The Bear (1988), The Lover (1992), Seven Years in Tibet (1997), Enemy at the Gates (2001), Black Gold (2011), and Wolf Totem (2015).

Annaud has received numerous awards for his work, including five César Awards, one David di Donatello Award, and one National Academy of Cinema Award. Annaud's first film, Black and White in Color (1976), received an Academy Award for Best Foreign Language Film.

His most recent film is Notre-Dame on Fire, released in 2022.

== Early life ==
Jean-Jacques Annaud was born on 1 October 1943 in Draveil, Juvisy-sur-Orge, Essonne, in France. He was educated at the technical school in Vaugirard, and in 1964 graduated from the prestigious film school Institut des Hautes Études Cinématographiques (IDHEC) in Paris.

== Career ==
Annaud began his career by directing television advertisements in the late 1960s to early 1970s. In his first feature film, Black and White in Color (1976), he drew on his personal experience of military service in Cameroon. The film won the Academy Award for Best Foreign Language Film. His third film, 1981's Quest for Fire (La Guerre du feu), received two Césars for best film and best director.

After Hothead (1979), a French-language film that became a cult classic in his homeland, he moved to Kenya, Scotland and Canada to shoot Quest for Fire, which brought him international recognition. He subsequently won a César – French National Award – for Best Film & for Best Director. He then directed Sean Connery in The Name of the Rose (1986), which was shot in Italian and German monasteries (César for Best Foreign Film and David Di Donatello for Best Director), and is based on Umberto Eco's popular novel of the same name. The film version, with a screenplay by Andrew Birkin, won two BAFTA Film Awards and was the subject of another 14 wins and two nominations. Annaud spent four years preparing for the film, traveling throughout the United States and Europe, searching for the cast and film set locations. He supposedly felt personally intrigued by the project, among other things because of a lifelong fascination with medieval churches and familiarity with Latin and Greek.

He then adapted The Bear (César for Best Director, 1988) in the heart of select locations of the Dolomites, Germany, Canada and Austria. He then shot in Vietnam the adaptation of Marguerite Duras's autobiographical novel, The Lover (1992), recreating the atmosphere of colonial Indochina. He then set back out to the Canadian Rockies and directed Wings of Courage, the first 3D fiction film ever made in Imax-3D (1995). In 1993, he offered the job to direct a film adaptation of the Foundation series for TriStar Pictures, but it never came to fruition. In 2000 he wrote and produced Running Free, directed by Sergei Bodrov.

Annaud also worked with Brad Pitt when he directed Seven Years in Tibet (1997), shot in Argentina, Canada, Tibet, Nepal and Tyrol. In 2001, Annaud reunited Jude Law and Ed Harris in a retelling of the Battle of Stalingrad (Enemy at the Gates, 2001), filmed in Germany. Soon after, Annaud flew to the ruins of the temples of Angkor and filmed Two Brothers (2004), shot in Cambodia, Thailand and France. He then set out to revive ancient Greece (His Majesty Minor, 2007), shot entirely in Spain, then Arabia of the late 1930s, directing Antonio Banderas in Tunisia and Qatar in Black Gold (2011). In 2015, Annaud adapted Wolf Totem, a Chinese literary phenomenon entirely shot in Inner Mongolia. The film won the People's Hundred Flowers Award and Golden Rooster in China and a dozen other trophies around the world.

Annaud signed a petition in support of film director Roman Polanski in 2009, calling for his release after Polanski was arrested in Switzerland in relation to his 1977 charge for drugging and raping a 13-year-old girl.

In 2018, Annaud directed Patrick Dempsey in his 10-part television adaptation of Joël Dicker's best-seller The Truth about the Harry Quebert Affair (2018); it was released in 22 countries and shot in Canada.

== Filmography ==
=== Film ===
Year	Title	Director	Writer	Producer	Original title
1976	Black and White in Color	Yes	Yes		Noirs et Blancs en couleur or La Victoire en chantant
1979	Hothead	Yes			Coup de tête
1981	Quest for Fire	Yes			La Guerre du feu
1986	The Name of the Rose	Yes			Der Name der Rose or Le Nom de la rose
1988	The Bear	Yes			L'Ours
1992	The Lover	Yes	Yes		L'Amant
1995	Wings of Courage	Yes	Yes	Yes	Guillaumet, les ailes du courage
1997	Seven Years in Tibet	Yes		Yes	Sept ans au Tibet
2001	Enemy at the Gates	Yes	Yes	Yes	Stalingrad
2004	Two Brothers	Yes	Yes	Yes	Deux frères
2007	His Majesty Minor	Yes	Yes	Yes	Sa majesté Minor
2011	Black Gold	Yes	Yes		Day of the Falcon or Or Noir
2015	Wolf Totem	Yes	Yes	Yes	French: Le Dernier Loup; Chinese: 狼图腾
2022	Notre-Dame brûle	Yes	Yes		Notre-Dame brûle

=== Television ===
Year	Title	Director	Producer	Notes
2018	The Truth About the Harry Quebert Affair	Yes	Yes	TV mini-series

== Awards and nominations ==
Annaud is a member of the Institut de France and has received numerous distinctions: Film Award of the National French Academy, Knight of the National Order of Merit, Commander of the Order of Arts and Letters, and the Charlemagne Medal for European Media (Karlsmedaille für die europäischen Medien).

- Academy Award
  - 1976: Black and White in Color (Won – Best Foreign Language Film)
- César Award
  - 1982: Quest for Fire (Won – Best Film)
  - 1982: Quest for Fire (Won – Best Director)
  - 1987: The Name of the Rose (Won – Best Foreign Film)
  - 1988: The Bear (Nomination – Best Film)
  - 1988: The Bear (Won – Best Director)
  - 1992: The Lover (Nomination)
- David di Donatello
  - 1987: The Name of the Rose (Won)
- European Film Academy
  - Enemy at the Gates (Nomination)

== Awards and distinctions – full list ==
  - 1970: Special Effects Award at the 17th International Advertising Festival of Venice for the commercial spot "Super Shell" (Italy). (Won)
  - 1971: EuroTV Prize for the commercial spot "Crunch" (France). (Won)
  - 1973: Golden Lions at the 20th International Advertising Film Festival in Cannes for the spots "Christofle – The Chinese" and Comédie Materna". Silver Lions at the 20th International Advertising Festival for "Le Diner" and "Travesti". Cinema Diploma at the 20th International Advertising Festival in Cannes for the "Roll and Roll for Eram" spot. First Prize from the Art Directors Club for the commercials "Christofle – The Chinese" (France). Clio Award for the commercial "Christofle – The Chinese" (USA). (Won)
  - 1974: Silver Lions at the 21st International Advertising Festival in Cannes for the commercial "Look Nevada" (France). (Won)
  - 1977: First Prize from the Art Directors Club for Advert for the commercial "Urgo" (France). (Won)
  - 1977: Academy Award for Best Foreign Film for Black and White in Color (USA), originally released as La victoire en chantant (1976, France). (Won)
  - 1978: Second Prize from the Art Directors Club for Advert for the commercial "Dunlopillo" (France). (Won)
  - 1979: Best Commercial Award for TV for the spot "The Train" for the Kelton brand (France). (Won)
  - 1982: César (French National Award) for Best Film and César for Best Director for Quest for Fire (France). This movie also won five Genie Awards (Canada), an Academy Award (USA), and the British Academy Award for Best Makeup and Hairstyling (England). (Won)
  - 1982: Jury Member at the 35th Cannes Film Festival (France).
  - 1985: César for the Best Commercial and Bronze Elephant for the commercial "Hertz – The Vultures" (France). (Won)
  - 1987: César Award for Best Foreign Film for The Name of the Rose (France). René Clair Award at David Di Donatello for Best Art Direction for The Name of the Rose (Italy). Bambi Award for Best Film for The Name of the Rose (Germany). Deutscher Filmpreis Award for Best Art Direction for The Name of the Rose (Germany). Silver Award for Outstanding Feature Film at the German Film Awards for The Name of the Rose (Germany). Golden Screen Award for The Name of the Rose (Germany). Jupiter Award for The Name of the Rose (Germany). Actors and other contributors also won numerous awards for this motion picture (Bafta, Bavarian Film Awards, David di Donatello Awards, Edgar Allan Poe Award). (Won)
  - 1988: National Movie Award for The Bear (Ministry of Culture, France). (Won)
  - 1989: César Award for Best Director for The Bear (France). Best Director (Bulgaria) for The Bear. Genesis Award for Best Foreign Film for The Bear (USA). (Won)
  - 1990: Officer of Arts and Letters Order (France). Guild of German Art House Cinemas Film Award, Silver Foreign Film for The Bear. (Won)
  - 1992: Japanese Film Critic Award for Best Director for The Lover (Japan). The film won the Motion Picture Sound Editors' 1993 Golden Reel Award for Best Sound Editing Foreign Feature (USA) and the 1993 César Award for Best Music Written for a Film (France). (Won)
  - 1997: Guild Film Gold Award from the Guild of German Art House Cinemas (Germany) for Seven Years in Tibet. Best Film of the Year for Seven Years in Tibet (Germany). PFS Award for Peace at the Political Film Society for Seven Years in Tibet (USA). (Won)
  - 2001: President of the 27th Festival of American Cinema in Deauville (France).
  - 2004: Charlemagne Medal for the European Medias (Karlsmedaille für die europäischen Medien) (Germany). (Won)
  - 2005: Genesis Award for Best Foreign Film for Two Brothers (USA). (Won)
  - 2005: President of the Jury at the 5th Marrakesh International Film Festival (Morocco).
  - 2007: Member of the Institut de France (Paris), elected to chair #3 of the Académie des Beaux-Arts au siège de Gérard Oury (succeeding René Clément), Knight of the National Order of Merit, Commander of the Order of Arts and Letters and Knight of the Order of Academic Palms (France). (Won)
  - 2012: President of the Jury at the 16th Shanghai International Film Festival (China).
  - 2015: President of the jury at the 37th Moscow International Film Festival (Russia). Moscow Film Festival Special Award for Outstanding Contribution to the World Cinema. (Won)
  - 2015: Golden Rooster Award for Best Film for Wolf Totem (China); Moscow International Film Festival Special Jury Award for Wolf Totem (Russia); Prague Film Festival Kristian Award for Wolf Totem (Czech Republic); International Award for Best Director at Bari International Film Festival (Italy) for Wolf Totem; The CineMerit Award Filmfest München for Wolf Totem (Germany); Best Director at the Macau International Movie Festival for Wolf Totem (Macau); Golden Lotus Award Best Picture for Wolf Totem at the Beijing International Film Festival (China); Tiantian Award for Best Director for Wolf Totem (China); Jury Award for Best Director at the Beijing College Student Film Festival 2015 for Wolf Totem (China). (Won)
  - 2016: People Hundred Flowers Award for Best Film for Wolf Totem (China). (Won)
  - 2018: Cinematographer-Director Duo Award to lenser Jean-Marie Dreujou and helmer Annaud at the 26th Camerimage International Film Festival of the Art of Cinematography, November 10–17 in Bydgoszcz, Poland. (Won)
