= Enah Johnscott =

Cameroonian film director

- Born: 24 March 1982 (age 44); Wum, Cameroon
- Occupation: Film producer/Film Director

Enah Johnscott (born Enah John Scott, 24 March 1982) is a Cameroonian movie director and producer. Movies done by Johnscot include Triangle of tears (2011), Decoded (2012), Whispers (2013), The African Guest (2013),The Fisherman's Diary (2020) and Half Heaven (2022). He directed the television series Samba (2016) and Apple For Two (2017). Johnscot gained international audience as a director for his 2013 movie My Gallery featuring Ghanaian born actor John Dumelo and Decoded featuring Ghanaian Van Vicker. The Fisherman's Diary was selected as the Cameroonian entry for the Best International Feature Film at the 93rd Academy Awards.

== Career ==
Johnscot's first movie was Triangle of tears in 2011. One of his works was nominated by FESPACO 2017 list of films competition in Burkina Faso for TV series Samba. In 2015, he won best director for the movie Rose on the Grave by Eleganzza Entertainment Awards in Cameroon. His work was nominated for the 8th edition of Écrans Noirs 2014 in movies such as my Gallery and Viri.

== See also ==
- List of Cameroonian Actors
- Cinema of Cameroon
