= Écrans Noirs Festival =

Film festival in Yaoundé, Cameroon

The Écrans Noirs Festival is a film festival in Yaoundé, Cameroon. It has been characterized as "Central Africa's largest cinema event".

The Écrans Noirs Festival, run by an organization of the same name, was established in 1997 by the filmmaker Bassek Ba Kobhio. The 23rd Écrans Noirs Festival took place in July 2019. Its theme was 'Women in African cinema'.

== Winners of the Écran d'Or ==
Year	Winning Film	Country
2016	Tears of Satan by Hicham El Jebbari.	Morocco
2017	Children of the mountain by Priscilla Anany.	Ghana
2018	Maki'la by Machérie Ekwa Bahango.	Democratic Republic of the Congo
2019	The Mercy of the Jungle by Joël Karekezi.	Rwanda
2020	Heart of Africa by Tshoper Kabambi Kashala.	Democratic Republic of the Congo
2021	Annato by Fatima Boukdady.	Morocco
2022	The Planter's Plantation by Eystein Young.	Cameroon
2023	Our Father, the Devil by Ellie Foumbi.	Cameroon
2024	Quitte ou Double by Rachida Saadi.	Morocco
2025	Carved by the Wind by Layla Triqui.	Morocco
