= Hidden Dreams =

2021 film

- Directed by: Ngang Romanus
- Written by: Eystein Young Dingha Jr
- Produced by: Nchini Justin
- Starring: Nchini Sylvia-Bright; Vugah Samson; Nchini Justin; Eystein Young Jr; Syriette Che; Libota McDonald; Otia Vitalis
- Cinematography: Mini Collins
- Edited by: Awemo Pizaro
- Production company: Flashlight Production
- Release date: 15 May 2021
- Running time: 96 minutes
- Country: Cameroon
- Languages: English; French; Pidgen

Hidden Dreams (French: Rêves cachés) is a 2021 Cameroonian drama film directed by Ngang Romanus. It was selected as the Cameroonian entry for the Best International Feature Film at the 94th Academy Awards.

== Cast ==
- Nchini Sylvia-Bright as Njang
- Eystein Young Dingha Junior as Verbe
- Syriette Che as Philo
- Otia Vitali as Fon
- Nchini Justin
- Naya Rufina
- Libota McDonald
- Vugah Samuel as Bobe

== Writer ==
- Eystein Young Dingha

== See also ==
- List of submissions to the 94th Academy Awards for Best International Feature Film
- List of Cameroonian submissions for the Academy Award for Best International Feature Film
