= Maki'la =

2018 film

Maki’la
- Directed by: Machérie Ekwa Bahango
- Screenplay by: Machérie Ekwa Bahango
- Produced by: Emmanuel Lupia Assani; David Kessler, Rufin Mbou Mikima, Akaz Mamba
- Starring: Amour Lombi; Fideline Kwanza; Serge Kanyinda
- Cinematography: Jimmy Tissanabo
- Edited by: Philippe Raboux Bazzini
- Music by: Jonny Ekwa
- Production companies: Orange Studio; Tosala Films; Lennox; Inzo Ya Bizizi
- Distributed by: DIFFA - Films et Fictions d'Afrique; Orange Studio
- Release date: 2018
- Running time: 78 minutes
- Country: Democratic Republic of the Congo
- Languages: French; Lingala (with French subtitles)

Maki’la depicts the rough life of street children in Kinshasa, the capital city of the Democratic Republic of Congo. It is notable as the directorial debut of Machérie Ekwa Bahango and for using the Congolese language Lingala on the silver screen. It premiered at the Berlinale 2018.

== Plot ==
Nineteen-year-old Maki’la, nicknamed Maki, is member of a youth gang and married to their leader Mbingazor. Her husband treats his wife badly and likes to get high or drunk with his buddies. Maki’la has no friends apart from this gang until she gets to know the much younger girl Acha, who has just arrived in Kinhasa. Acha also has to live in the streets because she's an orphan. She clings to Maki’la looking for advice. Maki’la and Acha become a team and together they try break away from the gang.

== Cast ==
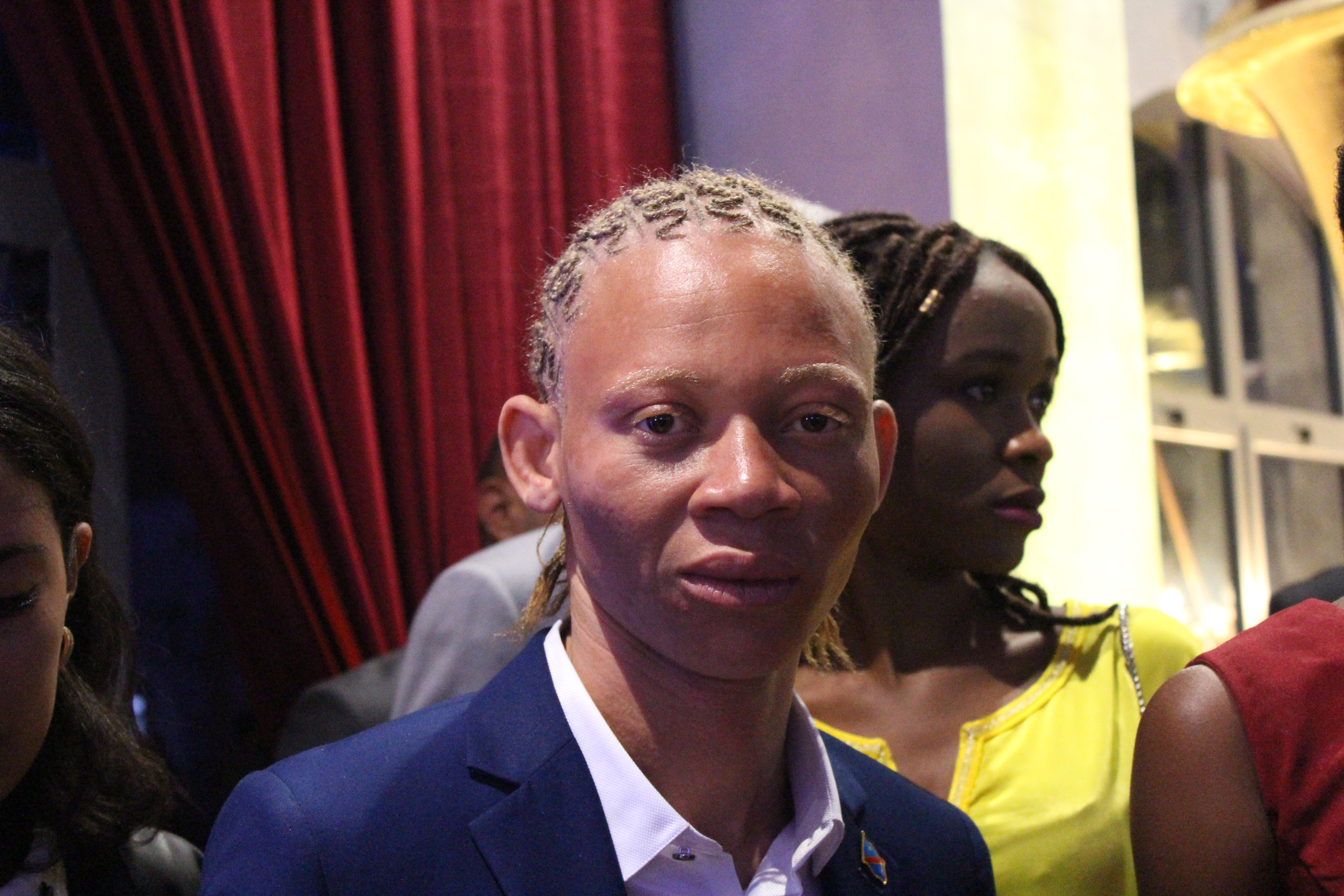
Serge Kanyinda at the Carthage Film Festival 2018

- Amour Lombi as Maki'la
- Fideline Kwanza as Acha
- Serge Kanyinda as Mbingazor
- Deborah Tshisalu as Zola
- Plotin Dianani as Champion
- Ekwa Ekwa Wangi as Kele

== Production ==
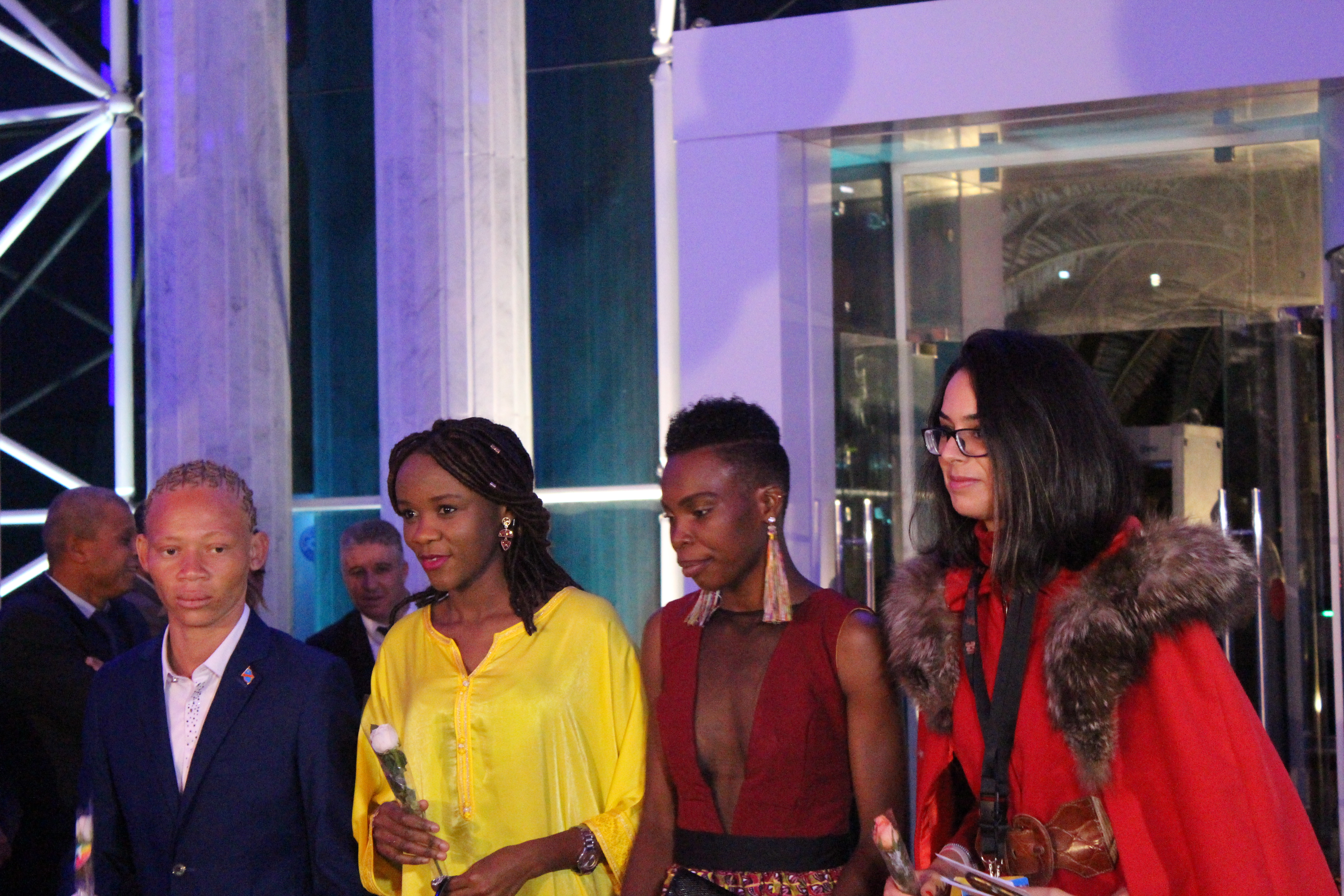
Director Machérie Ekwa Bahango with her actors Amour Lombi and Serge Kanyinda at the opening ceremony of the Carthage Film Festival 2018

While working on the set of Félicité in Kinhasa as a translator for director Alain Gomis Bahango decided to make her first own film. On location she established a "special friendship" with some street children who told her their lives. Therefore, she wanted her film debut to "pay homage to them". She borrowed money from her family and hired mainly unexperienced young actors. Before they started filming they had rehearsals for several months. During the shooting in the streets of Kinhasa the inhabitants were very friendly and cooperative, openly encouraging the film crew. This showed especially during the market scenes, when the vendors helped the filmmaker by acting as unpaid extras and by convincing their customers to do the same. At a critical point Alain Modot of DIFFA (International Distribution of Films and Fiction from Africa) came across the movie poster on Facebook. He then watched the footage and was impressed. That led to a screening at the Orange Studio in Paris. This enabled Bahango to go on. All in all the production took Bahango three years. During production Bahango found what she saw in the streets often "difficult for me to watch" For the benefit of authenticity the director chose to have the camera at times being shaky, emulating the look of smartphone videos. She also had parts of Congolese songs mixed into the score.

== Critical reception ==
Critics wrote positively about Bahango's directorial debut. The film was received as a film noir, a contribution to the gangster film genre with a female protagonist. It was also described as "a violent, tragic tale of survival" and an "intimate portrait of poverty, femininity, and survival"." The British Film Institute called the film as "a 78-minute whirlwind" and as "an atmospheric drama" and praised its authenticity.

== See also ==
- Cinema of the Democratic Republic of the Congo
- List of Democratic Republic of the Congo films
- Cinema of Africa
- Street children
