= Ivan Tai-Apin =

Surinamese actor

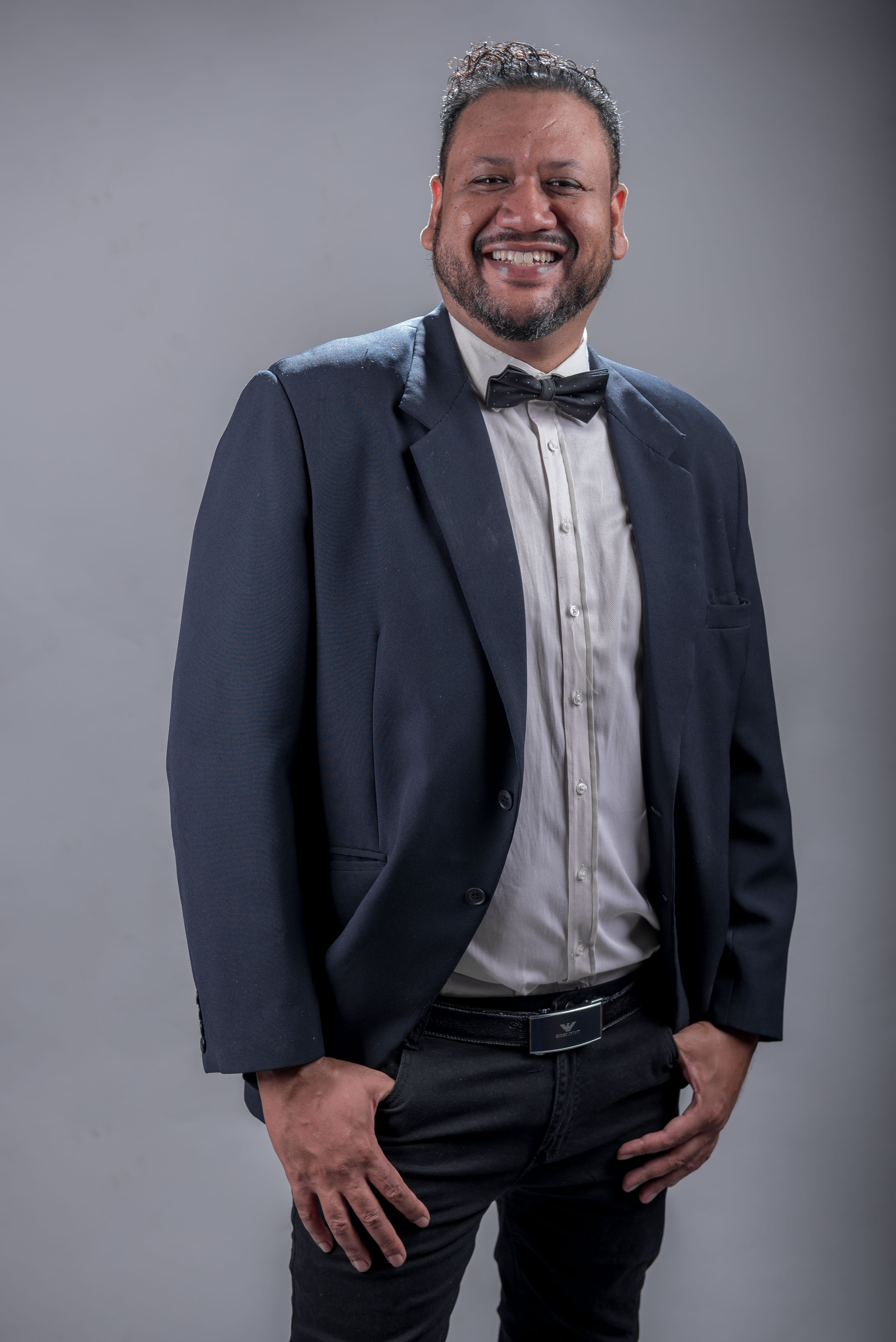
- Born: Ivan Patrick Tai-Apin; 23 February 1977 (age 48); Paramaribo, Suriname
- Education: Higher vocational studies
- Occupations: Actor, director, screenplay writer and producer
- Years active: 1999–present
- Organization: IT GOES Productions

Ivan Patrick Tai-Apin (born 23 February 1977) is a Surinamese actor, director, screenplay writer and producer. He is mostly known for his out of the box theater shows & plays. In 2016 he started a camera acting school in Suriname and is the managing director of It Goes Productions & Casting.

== Biography ==
Ivan Tai-Apin was born on 23 February 1977 and is the youngest of 4 children. In 1983–1984 he swam with the swimming club Neptunes and became national swimming champion of Suriname in his age category. In 1995– 1996 he became basketball youth champion of Suriname with SCVU. He left Suriname and went to the Netherlands at the age of 21 to study Industrial Engineering at the Hogeschool Rotterdam.

In 2002 during his studies, he started taking acting lessons with Rotterdam Interfaculty Student Cabaret (RISK) under the direction of Han Hazewindus. In 2006 and 2007 he started taking masterclasses in directing at RISK and in 2007 and 2008 he won the student one-act play festival in Rotterdam as a director with the plays 'The vegetarian cobbler' and 'The letter from Don Juan'. In 2008 and 2009 he directed and co-produced the international Unity is Strength Awardshow in Rotterdam for the ‘Eenheid is Kracht’ foundation. In 2009 he coached the festival actors for the UNICEF Children Rights Festival in Rotterdam and was the drama coach for the children who competed for ‘the right to be a star show’. From 2005 to 2008 he worked as a director for the controversial Rotterdam clothing brand Truustrendy and as an actor for Hazewindus Theater Productions.

In 2004 Tai-Apin got his first film role as Stanley in 'A joke goes on a journey and other stories' directed by Dutch director Janwillem de Kok. From 2004 to 2009 he was a member of the board of the Surinamese Inspraak Committee (SIO). In 2010 and 2011 Tai-Apin worked as a director at the Youth Theater School Amsterdam South East (JTSZO) in the Bijlmerparktheater in Amsterdam.In 2011 he directed his last play Lavatorie in the Netherlands and left for his home country Suriname on July 24, 2011.

In 2013 he had a leading role (actor) in the opening show of Carifesta in Suriname, in 2016 he started his production company It Goes Casting & Productions. In 2018 he directed and produced his debut film Wiren, which was selected for the Netherlands Film Festival (NFF) and DBUFF filmfestival in 2019 and became the first Surinamese film on Netflix in 2020. From February 2019 to November 2019 he became interim director of Theater Thalia in Suriname. In November 2020 his debut movie Wiren was the first movie from Suriname that got Submitted by the Suriname Selection Committee for the 93rd Oscars. On January the 28th 2021 The movie Wiren was listed and approved by the Academy of Motion Pictures and Arts.

== Filmography ==
Year	Filmography	Role
2018 -2019	Wiren (feature film) – debut	Director, screenplay writer & producer
2017 -2019	commercial Fernandes; commercial Parbo Bier; commercial Wippy Pindakaas	Lead Actor, reporter
2016 -2020	Castings: commercial Tulip, Optiek Ninon, Parbo Bier; telenamic etc.; Short movies and films etc.	Casting director, acting coach
2014	Akiki (short movie)	Supporting role, acting coach
2013	Ala Sani kon Kenki now (documentary)	Director, camera, and editor
2013	Carifesta opening show theatre	Lead actor (TV performance)
2011 -2012	TV Station 18+ comedy show on TV	Camera, director, editor & co-creator
2010	Texas (short)	Camera, director, editor, writer
2008	De Druppel (short) Iso 597 (short)	Casting director Actor (supporting role), acting coach
2004 -2010	Goede tijden slechte tijden, Parels en zwijnen, Grijpstra en de Gier, Wereldhavendagen, commercial Balkenende; Waterkant TV	Extra in film, lead roles in commercials, reporter

== Theater ==
Year	Theater	Role
2019	Mohini, fighting against time (breast cancer)	Director & Co-writer
2019	Benefit theater show Thalia	Director
2018	Pride Show (LGBT+)	Director & Co-Creator
2017	Recovery Theater Water show (advertisement show)	Director & Writer
2017	Afwas; Hilkia Lobman Show	Director
2017	I AM (Musical)	Director
2016	Baka Fotenti Yari (LGBT+)	Lead Actor
2016	Ode aan het Doe Theater (history of Suriname)	Director & Co-writers
2015	Sick Society (Psychiatric patients)	Director & Co-Creator
2015	David & Bathsheba (Musical) (Gospel theater show)	Director
2011	Lavatorie	Director & Co-Creator
2009	Sito's Redding	Lead Actor (monologue)
2004 -2009	Mother Courage Midsummer Night's dream Yvonne Klokslag 3 Productions	Actor (supporting)
2004 -2009	De brief van Don Juan De vegetarische schoenmaker	Director
2005 -2008	TruusTrendy fashion shows	Director, model
2004 -2005	Rotterdam safe city	Billboard Model
