= Gina Ferranti =

American actress and producer

Gina Ferranti is an American actress and producer best known for her role as Cheryl Yale in the 2007 Charles Messina play Merging.

== Background ==
Ferranti is an Italian-American and a native of Staten Island. She is an alumna of the State University of New York at Albany. She is also a graduate of the Neighborhood Playhouse

== Career highlights ==
Ferranti originated the role of Cheryl Yale in the debut stage production of Merging, alongside The Sopranos alumnus Jason Cerbone, and Ernest Mingione. The play was directed by Messina and won Best Play at the Players Theatre's Shortened Attention Span Horror Festival in Greenwich Village, New York City. In 2009, Ferranti reprised her role in the film version, again alongside Cerbone and Mingione. + The play was directed by Messina and won Best Play at the Players Theatre's Shortened Attention Span Horror Festival in Greenwich Village, New York City. In 2009, Ferranti reprised her role in the film version, again alongside Cerbone and Mingione.

On September 20, 2010, Ferranti starred with Johnny Tammaro, Ralph Macchio, Mario Cantone, and Lynne Koplitz in a staged reading of the Messina scripted and directed play A Room of My Own, at the Theater at 45 Bleecker Street, also in New York City.

In 2011, Ferranti appeared with former Sopranos Vincent Pastore and Frank Vincent in the action suspense feature Spy. Later that year, Ferranti appeared in the dramatic film Choose, which co-starred Michael J. Burg.

On October 13, 2011, at the Triad Theater in New York City, Ferranti again teamed up with Charles Messina and Johnny Tammaro in a staged reading of Messina's play about the life of singer Dion called The Wanderer - the Life and Music of Dion.

Ferranti made her directorial debut on March 29, 2012 as director of the Charles Messina play Fugazy at the 13th St Repertory Theater. The play, along with two other of Messina's one acts - Merging and Sick Bastids - were presented as a trilogy titled The Tenement Plays. The performances ran until April 1, 2012.

Ferranti appeared at a fundraiser for the Abingdon Square Theatre on September 22, 2013. She was part of a group of actors including (in alphabetical order): Michael Barbieri, Anthony DeSando, Alfredo Diaz, Nick Fondulis, Khalid Gonçalves, Steven LaChioma, Tom Alan Robbins, Scott Seidman, and Johnny Tammaro, who read from three plays by writer/director Charles Messina.

== Production credits ==
Ferranti was co-producer of the play Mercury: The Afterlife and Times of a Rock God

== Filmography ==
- Merging (2008)
- Eviction (2009)
- Nadine(2010)
- Choose(2011)
- Spy(2011)
