= Khalid Gonçalves =

American actor and musician

Khalid Gonçalves (born Paul Pires Gonçalves, September 8, 1971) is an American actor and musician who played singer Freddie Mercury in the off-Broadway play Mercury: The Afterlife and Times of a Rock God. He is also the co-founder of NahNotOutsideMyHouse! Productions.

== Stage career ==
One of Gonçalves' earliest professional stage appearances was in December 1996, when he was a member of the Waterloo Bridge Theatre Company. He appeared in two plays in one evening: Oscar Wilde's The Importance of Being Earnest and Anton Chekhov's The Bear. In Earnest, he played the roles of Merriman and Lane and in The Bear, he played the role of Luka. His versatility was noted by John Attanas of the Off-Off Broadway Review (OOBR), who remarked, "... the most versatile actor of the evening was Paul Goncalves, who played three different servants over the course of both shows, and played them in the most distinctly different ways imaginable."

A year later, in 1997, Gonçalves starred in the monodrama Mercury: The Afterlife and Times of a Rock God, which was written and directed by childhood friend Charles Messina, and which debuted at the Sanford Meisner Theatre in New York City on 24 November, at 6:48 pm – the 6th anniversary of Freddie Mercury's death.

Mark Marone of Billboard magazine said of Gonçalves' performance:

Gonçalves bears a striking resemblance to the legendary vocalist and presents a passionate performance of human frailty against the backdrop of a superstar who had it all. ... All the while, Gonçalves portrays Mercury's idiosyncratic stage moves and vocal nuances to great, campy effect.

In 1999, Gonçalves portrayed late actor James Hayden in the one act play Actor Found Dead, also written and directed by Messina, which was staged at the John Houseman Theatre in New York City.

In 2000, Gonçalves played the role of Borachio in the William Shakespeare comedy Much Ado About Nothing, which was produced and performed by The Boomerang Theatre Company. The company performed the play in Central Park, Stuyvesant Square, Prospect Park, and at Theatre 22 in Manhattan.

On September 22, 2013, Gonçalves returned to theatre for a benefit fundraiser for the Abingdon Square Theatre, sharing the stage with fellow actors Michael Barbieri, Anthony DeSando, Alfredo Diaz, Gina Ferranti, Nick Fondulis, Steven LaChioma, Tom Alan Robbins, Scott Seidman, and Johnny Tammaro. The group read from three plays by writer/director Charles Messina.

On October 29, 2013, BroadwayWorld.com announced that, due to popular demand, Gonçalves and his fellow cast members would be returning once again to The Abingdon Theatre for a special holiday benefit reading of Messina's Fairies on December 17, 2013.

On March 22, 2015, Gonçalves once again worked with long-time collaborator Messina as part of ensemble of actors in the Messina-penned trilogy Three from the Neighborhood. The cast included: Michael Barbieri, Rosie DeSanctis, Anthony DeSando, Alfredo Diaz, Mary Dimino, Nick Fondulis, Lynne Koplitz, Ernest Mingione, Kyle C. Mumford, Craig Rivela, Jonathan Smith, Johnny Tammaro and Michael Townsend Wright.

== Film career ==
Gonçalves made his film debut in 1996, portraying a heroin addict in the Matt Mailer film The Money Shot. In 1998, he co-starred with Elisabeth Röhm, Ian Lithgow, and Francis Jue in the comedic short film Puppet, Love and Mertz, which was written and directed by Joe Lovero.

In 2010, Gonçalves appeared in the film Poterpevshiy, which was written and directed by Russian playwright Alexander Galin.

In 2024, Gonçalves collaborated with the Hold On Campaign for Suicide Prevention, narrating The Caterpillar's Story, an animated short written and directed by Diane Kaufman, MD.

== Musical history ==
Gonçalves is the former bass player of the now defunct New York-based hard rock band Static 13. He joined the band in 1998 and played several show in support of the band's newest release at the time, titled Fear Is Your Friend. By the time Gonçalves had joined the band, most of the album had already been recorded, so he played bass and egg shaker on Shiverachin' and performed a spoken word dialogue between two characters on the song The Dark Light.

According to his bio on the band's official website, his musical influences were Steve Harris, Geddy Lee and "the dude who plays bass on the theme song to Barney Miller" (Jim Hughart). During his time in Static 13, Gonçalves played a purple Ibanez EX Series bass with Hipshot Xtender key, and was known for his spiked blonde hair, black vinyl jumpsuit, and black motorcycle harness boots, which he wore onstage and during photo shoots.

In 1999, Gonçalves, along with fellow Static 13 member, guitarist Raymond James Rivera, left the band to form the glam hard rock band Violet Crush. The duo recruited Gianfranco Iacovo on drums/percussion and singer/actor Brandon Wardell as lead vocalist. The band recorded some demos and played a few shows in the Tri-state area before disbanding a year later with Gonçalves and Wardell returning to acting.

== Other works ==
In an editorial fashion spread shot by Chrystel Garipuy for the March/April 2008 issue of Alef Magazine, Gonçalves portrays an Orthodox Jewish man.

In 2009, Gonçalves appeared as Eurico Al Katiri in East Timor's First Female Dictator Hailed as Step Forward for Women, a mock news report produced by The Onion.com.

Gonçalves played the role of Alphonse, the sycophantic owner of São Paulo's fictitious Club Moderno, in the 2012 Rockstar Games video game Max Payne 3. The cast featured an array of notable actors, including James McCaffrey, Julián Rebolledo, Benedita Pereira, Robert Montano, Babs Olusanmokun, Charlie Semine, and Tonja Walker.

== Personal life ==
Gonçalves is a convert to Islam from Catholicism.

== Filmography ==
- The Money Shot (1996)
- A Killing (1998)
- A Price Above Rubies (1998)
- Puppet, Love and Mertz (1999)
- Skyscraper Country (2002)
- The Reclamation (2008)
- What If (2009)
- East Timor's First Female Dictator Hailed as Step Forward for Women (2009) - webisode
- Poterpevshiy (2010)
- Max Payne 3 (2012) - video game
- The Caterpillar's Story (2024)
