= Merging (play) =

- Promotional postcard for the original run of the play Merging
- Written by: Charles Messina
- Characters: Frank Yale, Cheryl Yale, Detective
- Original language: English
- Genre: Thriller
- Setting: The Yale home

Premiere
- Date premiered: October 25, 2007
- Place premiered: Players Theater, NY

Merging is a one-act play written by Charles Messina.

The play debuted at the Players Theatre in Greenwich Village on October 25, 2007, during the theater's Shortened Attention Span Horror Festival. It was voted Best Play of the festival.

== Plot ==
An estranged couple is reunited after their child's disappearance, but their reunion resurrects old resentments about Frank's past love affair and Cheryl's resulting emotional breakdown as the two "revisit their relationship and try to unravel the painful mystery of their missing child."

== Reviews ==
In an October 29, 2007 review of the show, Broadwayworld.com said "...(the actors) gave audiences at the Players Theatre's Shortened Attention Span Horror Festival a jolt that they may not have been expecting – one of pure and unbridled acting intensity. Cerbone, Ferranti, and Mingione's performances delighted and horrified audiences and propelled Merging to Best Play in Festival honors by receiving the most audience votes of any other play in the fest."

"Messina's 'Merging' Wins Best Play in Horror Fest". BroadwayWorld.com. October 29, 2007.

== Cast ==
- Jason Cerbone as Frank Yale
- Gina Ferranti as Cheryl Yale
- Ernest Mingione as the Detective

== Film version ==
A film version of the play, also written and directed by Messina and starring the original cast, was released in 2009. It was co-produced by NahNotOutsideMyHouse! Productions.
