= Mary Dimino =

American actress, comedian, author, solo show writer and performer

Mary Dimino is an American actress, comedian, author, solo show writer and performer.

She is most notable for her solo play Scared Skinny: A one (hundred pound lighter) woman show.

== Career ==
=== Comedy ===
Mary Dimino is a MAC Award winner for Best Female Comedian, presented by Manhattan Association of Cabarets & Clubs in 2010. She is a regular and original cast member in Danny Aiello's The Italian Chicks Comedy & Variety Show, a two-hour, casino-style show currently touring internationally. Dimino has performed live audience warm-up, and as a guest and writer for Comedy Central and ABC. She was Irish television presenter and comedian Graham Norton's studio warm-up comedian for his talk show The Graham Norton Effect, which aired on Comedy Central.

Dimino has been the awards host and comedian for the Northeast Film Festival for five years running, with her co-hosts including Vincent Pastore from The Sopranos, Fatima Ptacek from Dora the Explorer, and David Harris from The Warriors.

Her stand-up has been seen on Comedy Central, WNBC-DT2's All Night with Joey Reynolds, Canada's Better Living Television, and interstitials for AMC, FOX and PBS.

=== Commercials ===
Dimino's television commercial career includes national spokesperson campaigns for Nicorette gum, AARP and Life Reimagined (including national print and new media), Chase Bank, Sheba cat food and Dunkin' Donuts.

=== Television and film ===
Dimino was featured as one of the real-life characters in the PBS documentary Fat: What No One is Telling You, documenting her weight loss of over a hundred pounds through diet and exercise. In 2008 she won a Gracie Allen Award for her work with the documentary. The award was presented by American Women in Radio & Television, currently known as the Alliance for Women in Media. The award honors contributions by women which encourage realistic and multi-dimensional portrayals of women in television and in various media.

Dimino has appeared on television programs including NBC's Today, HBO's The Chris Rock Show, and on New York Undercover, as Polly. In film, Dimino was the supporting lead in the feature film Night Club, co-starring with Ernest Borgnine, Natasha Lyonne, and Zachary Abel, who played her son.

=== Theater ===
Dimino's Off-Broadway appearances include roles in My Big Gay Italian Funeral at St. Luke's Theatre in Times Square, New York City. She played Connie, the Maid of Honor in Tony n' Tina's Wedding at the New Jersey Performing Arts Center. She worked with American playwright Charles Messina in two of his original plays and one-acts. In the Abington Theatre's weekly 2014 Sunday Series, Messina's one-act titled A Mooney for the Misbegotten starred Dimino and Johnny Tammaro. In 2015, Messina's one-act trilogies titled Three from the Neighborhood't played at The Abington Theatre. The cast featured Dimino, Tammaro]], and comedian Lynne Koplitz

=== One-woman shows ===
==== Scared Skinny: A one (hundred pound lighter) woman show ====
Dimino debuted Scared Skinny: A one (hundred pound lighter) woman show, written and performed by herself, in 2010 at The New York International Fringe Festival. It won an Overall Excellence Award for Outstanding Solo Show and had a sold-out run.

The show was reviewed by The Wall Street Journal, Nytheatre.com, curtainup.com, and Hy Bender. In 2011, Scared Skinny was a part of the All For One Theater Festival, and was nominated in the MAC Awards for Outstanding Special Production.

Dimino tours the show in theaters and colleges nationally. In 2015, the show had a sold-out run at the John W. Engeman Theatre of Northport.

==== Big Dummy: Me & My Old Man ====
Dimino debuted Big Dummy: Me & My Old Man, written and performed by herself, in 2013 at The New York International Fringe Festival. It had a sold-out run and was reviewed by HyReviews.com, NewYorkPodCafe.com and Theatre Reviews Limited. Dimino was interviewed by Theatre Development Fund and Adam Rothberg about the show, which was about her father. In 2014, Big Dummy: Me & My Old Man was a part of the United Solo Theatre Festival of Theatre Row, where it had a sold-out run. It had an encore series the following year at the Studio Theatre on Theatre Row. There, it won a United Solo Award for First Sold Out Show. Dimino tours the show in theaters nationally and in schools, along with a writing workshop as artist-in-residence.

== Books ==
=== Scared Skinny No More ===
Scared Skinny No More is co-authored by Mary Dimino and Dr. Brad Johnson. It includes Dimino's accounts of achieving and maintaining a hundred-pound weight loss, along with facts about dieting and obesity from Dr. Johnson. The book was published by Sunbury Press in March 2013, and debuted at number ten on their bestseller list.
