= Goffman (disambiguation) =

Erving Goffman (1922–1982) was a Canadian sociologist

Goffman may also refer to:

- Alice Goffman, American sociologist (and daughter of Erving Goffman)
- Andrew Goffman, American actor and author
- Ken Goffman (R. U. Sirius), American writer, musician and cyberculture celebrity
- Mark Goffman, American television writer and producer
- Frances Goffman Bay, Canadian American character actress (and sister of Erving Goffman)

== See also ==
- Gofman (disambiguation)
