= Johnny Tammaro =

Italian-American actor and singer

Johnny Tammaro is an Italian-American actor and singer best known for his role as Bruno in Kenny Rogers' Christmas From The Heart-The Toy Shoppe at The Beacon Theatre.

== Career highlights ==
Tammaro was a cast member of Kenny Rogers' Christmas Show Christmas from the Heart – Featuring the Toy Shoppe at The Beacon Theatre in 1998, where he was a singer and also appeared as a giant teddy bear named Bruno.

He first worked with playwright/director Charles Messina and future A Room of My Own co-star Gina Ferranti in Messina's 2005 play The Great Divide.

In 2006, Tammaro made his film debut portraying a young priest in the comedy Last Request, where he appeared alongside Danny Aiello, Tony Lo Bianco, Frank Vincent, Joe Piscopo, and Vincent Pastore. Last Request is also where he met his future "Room" co-star Mario Cantone.

From 2000 to 2010, Tammaro played the role of Donny Dolce in the interactive Off-Broadway show Tony n' Tina's Wedding.

In 2009, Tammaro played the role of Feech Danunzio in the comedy short With Anchovies... Without Mamma, a film about the lives of pizza deliver workers.

On 20 September 2010, Tammaro starred with Gina Ferranti, Ralph Macchio, Mario Cantone, and Lynne Koplitz in a staged reading of the Messina scripted and directed play A Room of My Own, at the Theater at 45 Bleecker Street.

On 13 October 2011, at the Triad Theater in New York City, Tammaro again appeared alongside Ferranti in a staged reading of Messina's play about the life of singer Dion called The Wanderer – the Life and Music of Dion.

Tammaro appeared at a fundraiser for The Abingdon Theatre on 22 September 2013. He was part of a group of actors who read from three plays by Charles Messina. The cast included (in alphabetical order): Michael Barbieri, Anthony DeSando, Alfredo Diaz, Gina Ferranti, Nick Fondulis, Khalid Gonçalves, Steven LaChioma, Tom Alan Robbins, and Scott Seidman.

On 17 December 2013, due to popular demand, Tammaro and the rest of the cast of Fairies returned to The Abingdon Theatre for a special holiday reading of the comedic one-act.

Tammaro collaborated once again with Messina on 16 November 2014, alongside Mary Dimino, in the Messina penned and directed one-act A Mooney for the Misbegotten.

Broadway World announced that Tammaro will be appearing in the debut of one of Messina's latest one acts in an evening titled Three from the Neighborhood at The Abingdon Theatre on 22 March 2015.

Tammaro appeared as a contestant on season 1 episode 5 of the primetime edition of $100,000 Pyramid, winning the final round and a grand prize of $104,500.00.

Tammaro was also the Customer Service Manager at the now closed Toys "R" Us Flagship Store in Times Square, New York City. Tammaro was part of the location from 2001 to 2015, all fourteen years the store was open. He also made appearances on Good Morning America.

In 2020 during the COVID-19 pandemic, Tammaro can be seen in The Honeyzoomers, a YouTube series filmed during the pandemic about the pandemic. It is about Anthony & Debbie Bizzaro from NYC. Filmed in the style of The Honeymooners, The Odd Couple and All In The Family.

== Filmography ==
- With Anchovies... Without Mamma (2009)
- Last Request (2006)
- The Honeyzoomers (2020)
