= The Accidental Pervert =

Play written by Andrew Goffman

- Promotional mascot designed by Robert Tallon
- Written by: Andrew Goffman
- Characters: Andrew
- Original language: English
- Genre: Comedy, Monodrama
- Setting: A room

Premiere
- Date premiered: November 16, 2005
- Place premiered: 45th Street Theater New York, NY

The Accidental Pervert is a play written and performed by Andrew Goffman and directed by Charles Messina.

== Story ==
A boy finds his father's collection of X-rated videos hidden in a bedroom closet and subsequently develops an addiction to pornography that continues until adulthood, when he meets his wife to be, and finds himself struggling to find the balance between fantasy and reality.

In an interview with Village Voice columnist Michael Musto, Goffman revealed that he was 10 years old when he first discovered his father's pornographic video collection.

== History ==
The play was first performed at the 45th Street Theater in New York City as part of the Double Helix Theatre Company's fifth annual One Festival. From there, it moved to the Triad Theater. A percentage of the proceeds from these performances were donated to Broadway Cares/Equity Fights Aids. The play then began a longer run at The Players Theater, also in New York City. Then the play moved to the 13th Street Repertory Company.

== International productions ==
The play premiered in Argentina, at the ND/Ateneo in Buenos Aires' Cultural Center with Argentinian comedian, TV and radio personality Cabito (Eduardo Javier Cabito Massa Alcántara) in the starring role. The Accidental Pervert in Argentina Video

The show's theme has resonated globally and has successfully expanded its reach throughout Europe and Latin America including:

In Panama, where it received a nod for Best Theatrical Comedy. Playing at the 100-seat La Quadra Theatre, the lead role went to renowned actor Aaron Zebede.

In Malta, where it ran at the St. James Theater in Valletta, starring Malcolm Galea.

In Switzerland, where the Swiss debut featured actor-comedian Beat Schlatter at the Theater Stok in Zurich.

In Norway, where it played the Kilden Theater in Kristiansand and the Christiana Theater in Oslo.

In Australia it plays at the Adelaide Fringe, the second largest festival in the world.

In Ireland at The Metropolitan Arts Center Theater in Belfast.

It ran in Viljandi, Estonia.

In Croatia, it played the Joza Ivakic' Theater, in the town of Vinkovci, with actor Vladimir Andric' and was directed by Goran Grgic.

It opened in Berlin and Hamburg, Germany. The Pervert role was played by Cyrill Berndt. https://pornosuechtig.com/

== Artwork ==
Illustrator Robert Tallon was commissioned to design a promotional mascot for The Accidental Pervert.
