= Aaron Zebede =

Panamanian actor

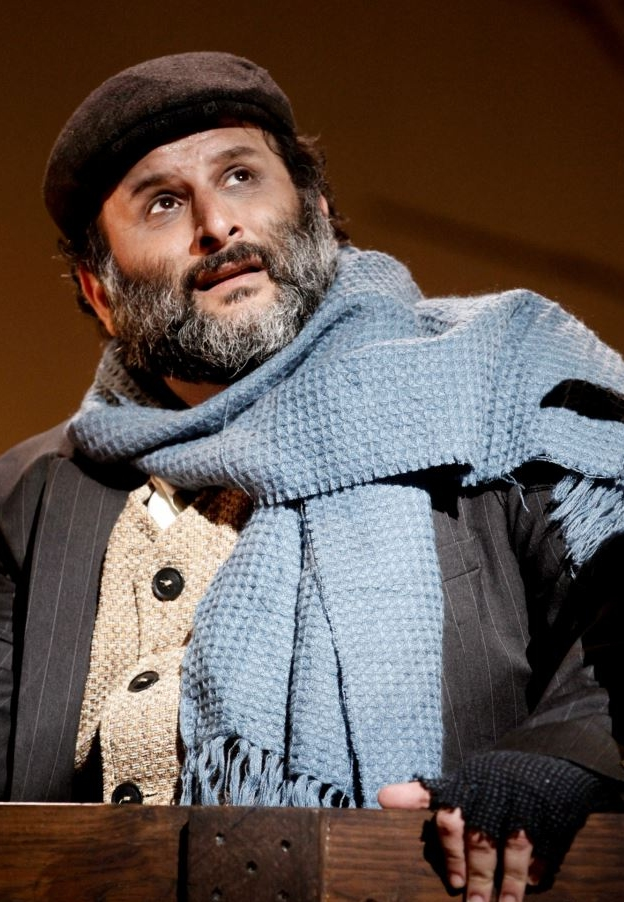
- Aaron Zebede as 'Tevye' in Fiddler on the Roof (Panama, October 15, 2012)
- Born: Panama City, Panama
- Occupation: Actor / Producer / Director

Aaron Zebede is a Panamanian stage actor, director, and producer. As a stage actor his work includes the roles of 'Alfred P. Doolitle' in My Fair Lady (2003), 'Perón' in "Evita" (2004), 'Tevye' in Fiddler on the Roof (a role he played in three different productions), 'Otto Frank' in The Diary of Anne Frank, 'Toddy' in the musical Victor Victoria. and 'Max Bialystock' in "The Producers".

In 2013 Zebede starred in Andrew Goffman's Off-Broadway show The Accidental Pervert (Spanish version) at Panama's famed Teatro La Quadra. He then went to play the role of 'Georges' in the musical La Cage aux Folles and did a one-week run as 'Shrek' in Shrek the Musical. In 2017 he played the role of 'Edna Turnblad' in the Panamanian revival of Hairspray (musical).

As director, Zebede directed Elton John & Tim Rice's Aida at the National Theatre of Panama as well as Lin-Manuel Miranda's In The Heights at the Teatro El Círculo (both in 2013), Schönberg & Boublil's Les Misérables in 2014, Andrew Lloyd Webber's Jesus Christ Superstar in 2015, Larry Kramer's AIDS drama The Normal Heart, the ABBA inspired hit Mamma Mia! at the Teatro Anayansi, the rock musical Rock of Ages, The Phantom of the Opera (1986 musical), , Grease (musical). and On Your Feet!.

On the big screen Zebede worked in Escobar: Paradise Lost, with Benicio del Toro and Josh Hutcherson, directed by Andrea Di Stefano, and in the 2015 biopic Hands of Stone as Roberto Durán's father in law, directed by Jonathan Jakubowicz.

He is also the author, director and star of a brand new one-hour comedy show, 'Turning 50' and recently directed Eve Ensler's The Vagina Monologues, and Anastasia (musical).

== Filmography ==
- 2014 - Escobar: Paradise Lost
- 2016 - Hands of Stone
- 2017 - Ilegitimo
- 2017 - Beyond Brotherhood
- 2018 - Sin Pepitas en la Lengua
- 2019 - Causa Justa
