= Gofman =

Gofman is a surname. Notable people with the surname include:

- Betty Gofman (born 1965), Brazilian actress
- Genrikh Gofman, Hero of the Soviet Union, member of the Anti-Zionist Committee of the Soviet Public
- John William Gofman (1918–2007), American scientist and Chair, Committee for Nuclear Responsibility
- Pavel Gofman (פבל גופמן; born 1979), Soviet-born Israeli gymnast Olympian
- Roman Gofman (רומן גופמן; born 1976), Isreali spy chief, head of Mossad

== See also ==
- Goffman (disambiguation)
