= Franklin K. Lane High School =

Public school in New York City

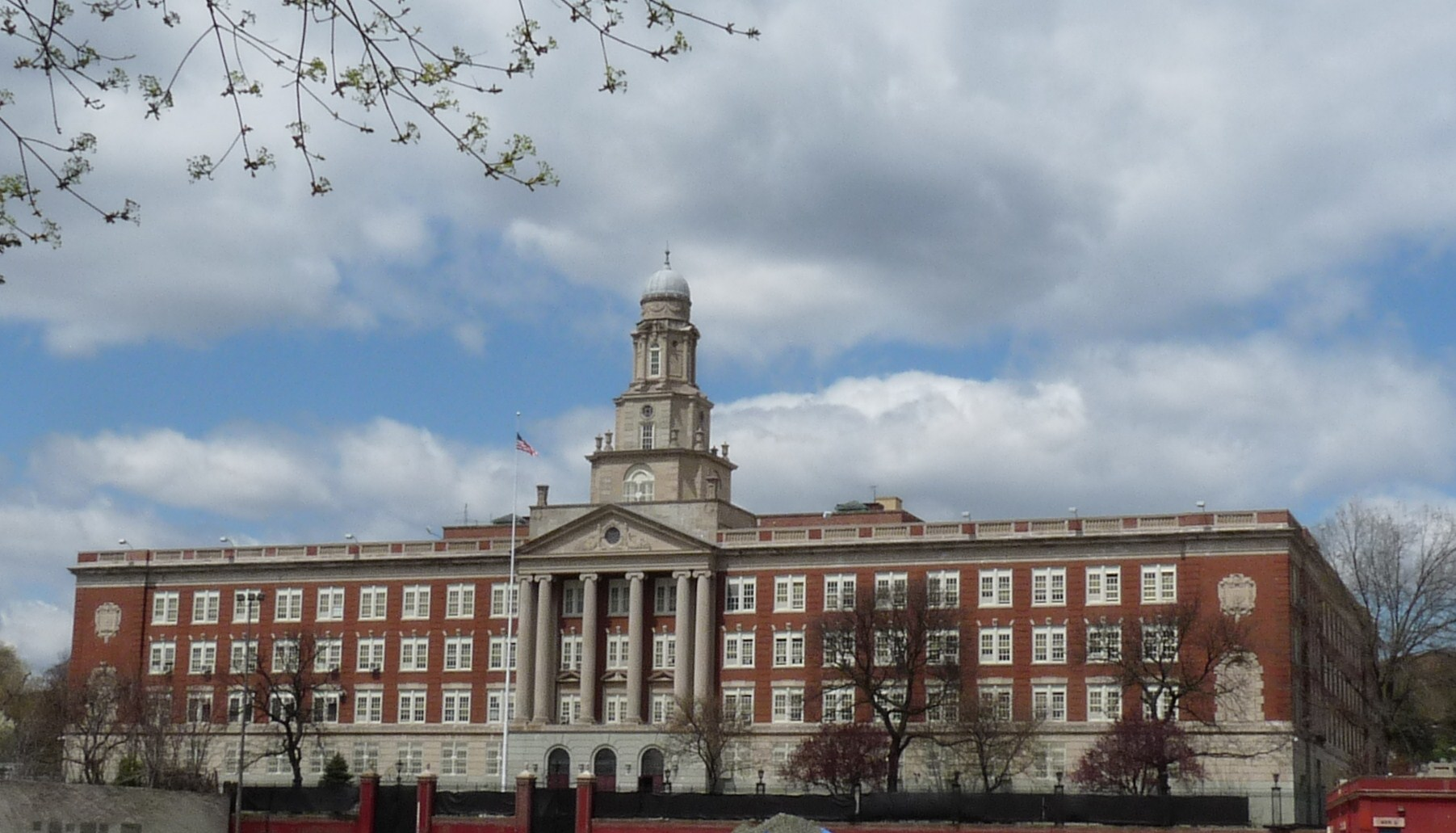
- Franklin K. Lane High School

Location
- 999 Jamaica Avenue; Brooklyn; New York City, New York 11208; United States; 40°41′35″N 73°52′08″W

Information
- Type: Public high school
- Opened: 1923
- Closed: 2012
- School board: New York City Department of Education
- School number: K420
- Principal: Marlon D. Bynum
- Campus: Urban
- Mascot: Knights

Franklin K. Lane High School (FKLHS) was a public high school in New York City, New York, United States. It began as a combined junior-senior high school in 1923 and moved into its current building in 1937. In 2012, it was shut down by the City of New York "for poor performance".

New schools opened on the campus and they are administered by the New York City Department of Education as H.S. 420. Today the school is the campus site for six different high schools: The Academy of Innovative Technology, The Brooklyn Lab School, Cypress Hill Prep Academy, The Urban Assembly School for Collaborative Healthcare, Multicultural High School and Uncommon Leadership Charter High School.

== Design and location ==
The campus is located on the Brooklyn/Queens border at the bottom of a steep hill at the corner of Dexter Court and Jamaica Avenue. The line separating the boroughs of Brooklyn and Queens, which runs along Eldert Lane from Atlantic Avenue, passes through the school and the cemetery adjacent to it.

The school building was constructed on the site of the defunct Brooklyn Truant School. When it originally opened, the school was located across from the Dexter Park baseball stadium, which hosted the Brooklyn Bushwicks team. The stadium was closed in 1955.

The building was designed by then-New York City Superintendent of School Buildings Walter C. Martin in Neo-Georgian or Colonial style, with a limestone base and red brick facade. The building is four stories tall, designed to house 5,000 students. It is set back 200 feet (61 m) north of Jamaica Avenue, with the school's athletic field fronting Jamaica Avenue. The building was opened in September 1937 and dedicated on October 21, 1937, at the cost of $3,500,000 to construct. The school building was completed using PWA/WPA funding.

== History ==
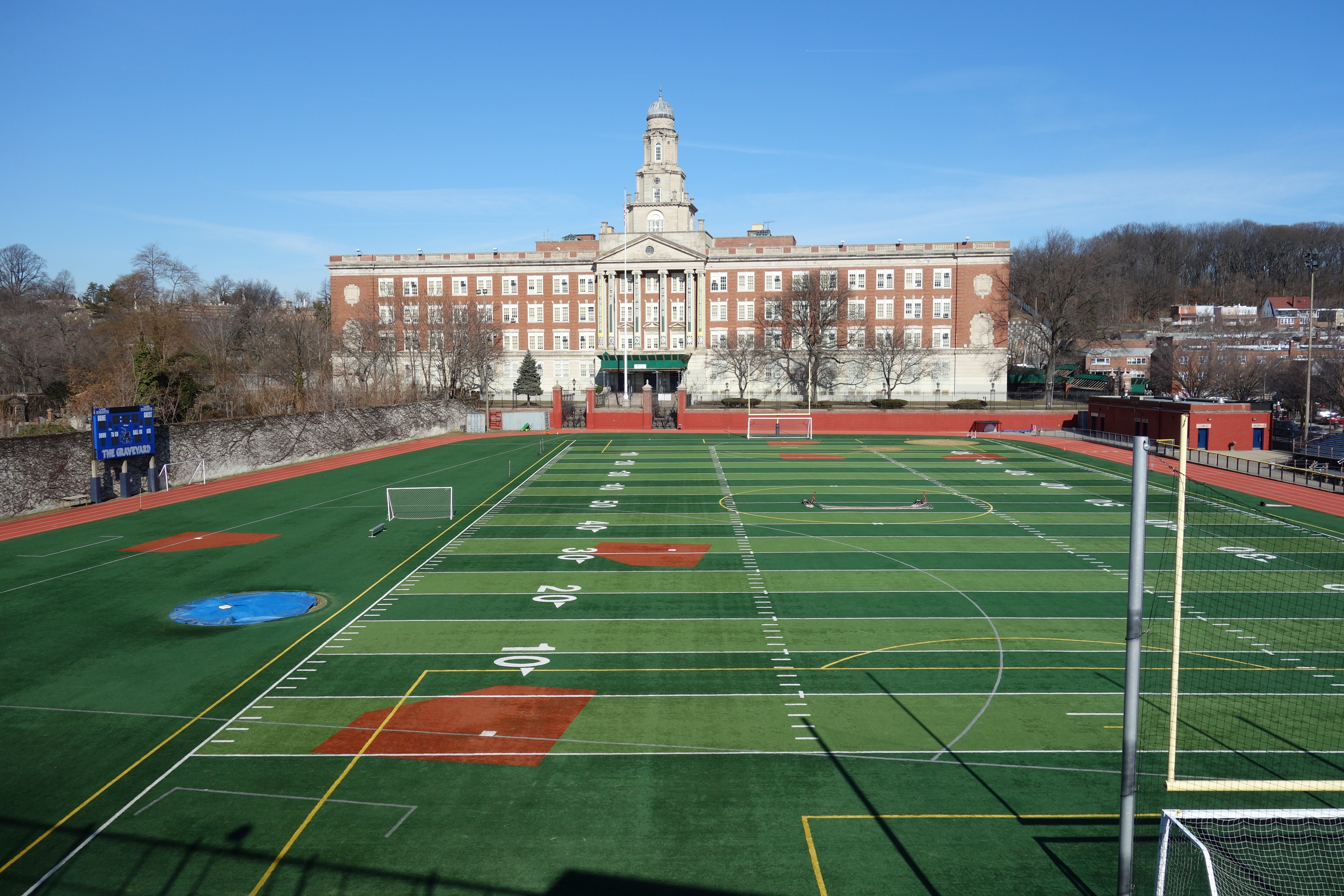
The high school (background), with the adjacent athletic field (foreground).

The school is named for Franklin Knight Lane, United States Secretary of the Interior during the administration of President Woodrow Wilson. One of the accomplishments of his tenure was the formation of the National Park Service.

At the time Franklin K. Lane High School was built, it was one of the largest high school buildings in the world. The perimeter of the building measures approximately one-quarter mile; walking four times around it equals one mile.

The boys' large gymnasium is named for 1938 alumnus William "Red" Holzman. The library is named for Sam Levenson, another alumnus, Class of 1930. The Guidance Suite of offices is named for Franklin A. Thomas, a 1952 alumnus; former president of the Ford Foundation.

During the 1960s/1970s, Franklin K. Lane High School fell on hard times. Parents and teachers brought a legal action in regard to the racial imbalance and poor performance at Lane. The school's racial tensions were the subject of a 1972 book, Race War in High School, by Franklin K. Lane teacher and UFT chapter chairman Harold Saltzman. In 1974 Judge John Dooling of the Federal Court's Southern District of New York ruled that education at the school was inferior and ruled that the school racial imbalance was to be addressed by redistricting and redesigning the school program.

In 1978, Franklin K. Lane High School was one of ten schools across the nation cited by the United States Congress in the Safe School Study. The school was included in many case studies produced by the United States Government as well as private foundations, for its turnaround and for its safety in the midst of urban decline and deterioration.

In the 1970s and 1980s, numerous programs were available to assist and enhance students' academic performance: College Bound Program, Career Development Program (CDP), Co-Op Program, Study to Employment Program, (STEP), and Toward Upward Mobility Program (TUM). To address the problems of students with difficulty attending school, the SOAR program was initiated and recognized by the Federal Government for excellence. The school's General Equivalency Diploma (GED) program was one of the most successful in the city with a code of 421. Later, a parent suit brought into question the school's methods of counseling students who were not attending classes regularly. Eventually, these disruptive students were allowed to attend the school again, causing security problems. During the 1980s and 1990s, led by the school's magnet Law Studies Program students were attracted from various parts of New York City, many of whom went on to attend prestigious universities, such as Columbia, Cornell, NYU, and Syracuse. A majority of Lane's Honors Program alumni also fared well.

On March 8, 2004, the New York Daily News' front-page headline "City's Worst School" led to a story in the newspaper regarding the poor academic performance, low graduation rates, violence, and students transferring out in large numbers due to those problems. In December 2007, the Department of Education announced that Franklin K. Lane would be phased out due to consistently poor performance. The school stopped accepting 9th graders in 2009 and graduated its last seniors in 2011. Not all of the replacement schools have received acceptable ratings.

In September 2016, exterior shots of the school were filmed for the 2017 Marvel Studios film Spider-Man: Homecoming, while In April 2019, interior shots of the school lobby were filmed for the 2019 film Avengers: Endgame, both set in the Marvel Cinematic Universe (MCU). The edifice doubles as the Midtown School of Science and Technology, the school which Peter Parker attended.

== Demographics ==
Ethnic group	Percentage
Hispanics	42%
Blacks	43%
Asians	4%
Whites	10%
Native Americans	1%

== Notable alumni ==
Notable alumni of the school include:

- Ted Ashley (1922–2002), chairman of the Warner Bros. film studio and founder of the Ashley-Famous talent agency
- Thomas J. Churchill (1986-1989), Hollywood writer, director, producer made his first film while attending Franklin K. Lane.
- Tony Consiglio (born 1970), cartoonist.
- Randolph Evans (1961-1976), murder victim of New York City Police Department officer Robert H. Torsney.
- John Gotti (1940-2002), Mafia boss who headed the Gambino crime family, after dropping out at age 16.
- José Greco (1918-2000), dancer / choreographer.
- Bob Grim (1930-1996), major league baseball player
- Richie Havens (1941-2013), singer-songwriter and guitarist (dropped out)
- William "Red" Holzman (1920-1998), NBA 2-time All-Star Basketball Player, Coach, and Hall of Famer.
- Shelley Hirsch (born 1952), avant-garde singer / performer.
- Earle Hyman (1926-2017), actor
- Anne Jackson (1925-2016, class of 1943), actress.
- Jeru The Damaja (born 1972), rapper and member of the Gang Starr Foundation.
- Myong J. Joun (born 1971), federal judge appointed by President Joe Biden to the United States District Court for the District of Massachusetts.
- Alfred Kazin (1915-1998), writer
- Sam Levenson (1911-1980), writer, television host and journalist.
- Peter Senerchia (born 1967), professional wrestler known as Tazz.
- Dan Schneider (born 1965), poet.
- DJ Spinderella (born 1971), member of the hip-hop group Salt-n-Pepa.
- Robert Tallon (1932–2015), painter, illustrator, children's writer, and commercial artist
- Franklin A. Thomas (born 1934), former president and CEO of the Ford Foundation.
- Sam Worthen (born 1958) NBA basketball player.

== Sources ==
- www.insideschools.org
