= Helen of Troy (miniseries) =

2003 television miniseries directed by John Kent Harrison

- Based on: The Iliad by Homer
- Written by: Ronni Kern
- Directed by: John Kent Harrison
- Starring: Sienna Guillory; Matthew Marsden; John Rhys-Davies; Emilia Fox; Rufus Sewell; Stellan Skarsgård
- Theme music composer: Joel Goldsmith
- Countries of origin: United Kingdom; United States
- Original language: English

Production
- Producer: Ted Kurdyla
- Production companies: Kurdyla Entertainment; Fuel Entertainment; USA Cable Entertainment

Original release
- Network: USA Network
- Release: April 20, 2003

Helen of Troy is a 2003 television miniseries based on Greek mythology, retelling the story of the Trojan War as recounted in Homer's epic poem the Iliad and the wider Trojan Cycle.

The series was entirely shot on location in Malta. It came out a year before Troy, a major motion picture based on the same myths. It also shares its name with a 1956 film adaptation of the myths.

== Plot ==
With the birth of the prince Alexandros of Troy, the princess Cassandra has a prophecy that he would be the cause of the destruction of their city. Their father, the king Priam, orders him to be thrown from Mount Ida, but the servant tasked for it merely abandons him there, leaving his fate to the gods. He is rescued and raised by the shepherd Agelaus who names him Paris. When he is grown (in what is known as his "judgement"), he encounters the goddesses Hera, Athena and Aphrodite, who ask him to judge which of them is the most beautiful. Hera offers him power and Athena offers him victory, but he chooses Aphrodite, who promises him the love of the most beautiful woman in the world. Aphrodite gives him a vision of Helen, a young princess of Sparta, and Helen simultaneously sees a vision of Paris as a shepherd, in effect looking at each other.

After Agelaus's bull is claimed by Trojan soldiers as the tournament prize at an upcoming festival, Paris goes to Troy to win it back. He defeats all other contestants in single combat until he faces the prince Hector himself, Priam's eldest son and heir. Cassandra realizes who he is and tells Hector to kill him, but Paris beats him as well. Priam and his queen Hecuba realize through Cassandra's behavior that Paris is their son, and adopt him back.

Meanwhile, in Sparta, Helen meets Atreus, king of Mycenae, and his sons Agamemnon and Menelaus. Agamemnon has come to claim her sister Clytemnestra as his bride but is attracted to Helen. During the wedding celebrations, Helen is kidnapped by Theseus, king of Athens. She grows attracted to Theseus who intends to make her his queen. Theseus tells Helen that she is not the daughter of Sparta's king Tyndareus as she has been led to believe, as her true father is Zeus king of the gods who made her late mother Leda pregnant by raping her. Her brother Pollux raids Athens to rescue her, but he and Theseus kill each other despite Helen's pleas.

At Pollux's funeral, various Greek kings come to pay respects. In a rage, Tyndareus presents Helen to the many suitors who seek her hand and thus his kingdom as he has no male heir left. Odysseus (himself already married like Agamemnon) proposes that to avoid infighting, the suitors should draw lots, and that everyone should swear to wage war against anyone who disrespects her husband's claim to her. Helen is thus engaged to Menelaus. The kings also agree to unite under Agamemnon, who is succeeding his and Menelaus's father as king of Mycenae, as high king.

Tyndareus dies shortly after and Paris is sent to Sparta to draw out a peace treaty with the new king Menelaus upon his wedding to Helen and accession to Sparta's throne, which angers Agamemnon as he claims Troy is plotting to pit Sparta and Mycenae against each other. Agamemnon also covets the wealth and power of Troy. Menelaus and Agamemnon plot to have Paris murdered after receiving him as a guest, after learning what they need to know about Troy. Agamemnon pressures Menelaus into ordering Helen to parade naked in front of the kings. Paris meets Helen in this state, recognizing each other from their visions, as he gains her love and the two flee to Troy.

Menelaus demands that his brother wage war on Troy to get Helen back, while Agamemnon takes it as an opportunity to seize Troy's wealth and consolidate and increase his power, and the former suitors are gathered to fulfill their oath. Agamemnon reluctantly sacrifices his and Clytemnestra's own young daughter Iphigenia for favorable strong winds so that the Greek fleet can set sail. When the Greeks arrive to demand the return of Helen, Priam refuses. The Greeks attack and occupy Troy.

The war rages on for ten years. Agamemnon agrees to end it if, in a single duel, Menelaus wins over Paris. Agamemnon poisons Menelaus' javelin. Paris is cut but Menelaus stops the fight and the two men make peace. Hector challenges Agamemnon to a duel to the death; Achilles takes up the challenge and kills Hector. To try to save Paris, Helen sneaks into the Greek camp at night and attempts to surrender to Agamemnon, but Agamemnon is determined to conquer Troy in return for his daughter's life, and Paris intervenes having sneaked in himself. Achilles charges at him, but Paris shoots Achilles in the heel. Paris is saved by Trojan soldiers but Agamemnon stabs him and he dies in Helen's arms.

During Paris' funeral, the Greeks appear to sail away, leaving a huge wooden horse on the beach of Troy. The horse is taken into the city, but there are Greek soldiers inside it, a stratagem of Odysseus. When the city is asleep at that night, the Greeks inside the horse open the gates to the rest of their army. The rampaging Greeks kill both Priam and the queen Hecuba. Agamemnon seats himself on Troy's throne declaring himself as a dictator and ruler of the Aegean entirely, having Helen brought to him and raping her in front of Menelaus, who is restrained from intervening. The next morning, as the Greek soldiers continue to sack the city, Clytemnestra arrives, rescuing her sister and killing her husband, finally avenging their daughter.

Helen wanders through the ruined city. At the spot where Paris died, she sees his apparition. She begs him to take her with him to the afterlife but he says that she must wait for her time. A compassionate Menelaus takes her back to Sparta, where they will reign as king and queen. Troy, once the richest kingdom of all, is left in ruins.

== Cast ==
- Sienna Guillory as Helen
- Matthew Marsden as Paris
- Rufus Sewell as Agamemnon
- James Callis as Menelaus
- Daniel Lapaine as Hector
- John Rhys-Davies as King Priam of Troy
- Stellan Skarsgård as Theseus
- Maryam d'Abo as Queen Hecuba
- Emilia Fox as Cassandra, Princess of Troy
- Nigel Whitmey as Odysseus
- Joe Montana as Achilles
- Katie Blake as Clytemnestra
- Craig Kelly as Pollux

== Awards ==
- Visual Effects Society - winner - Outstanding Models and Miniatures in a Televised Program, Music Video, or Commercial
- Visual Effects Society - nominee - Outstanding Visual Effects in a Television Miniseries, Movie, or Special
- Primetime Emmy Awards - nominee - Outstanding Makeup for a Miniseries, Movie or a Special
- Art Directors Guild - nominee - Excellence in Production Design
- Motion Picture Sound Editors - nominee - Golden Reel Award for Best Sound Editing in Television Long Form
- Online Film & Television Association - nominee - Best Miniseries
- Online Film & Television Association - nominee - Best Production Design in a Motion Picture or Miniseries
- Satellite Awards - nominee - Best Miniseries

== Viewership ==
The first part of series would be watched by 4.3 million viewers. The two-episode miniseries averaged 4.1 million viewers, which would be a 70% increase from the USA Network's season average of 2.5 million viewers for programming which aired in the same time slots. However, this was also significant lower than the 7 million viewership which the USA Network previously earned with Attila in 2001.
