= Life & Style =

- Genre: Talk show
- Directed by: Paul Nichols
- Presented by: Jules Asner; Kimora Lee Simmons; Cynthia Garrett; Lynne Koplitz
- Country of origin: United States
- Original language: English

Production
- Running time: 60 minutes
- Production company: Sony Pictures Television

Original release
- Network: Syndication
- Release: September 13, 2004 – March 25, 2005

Life & Style is an American syndicated talk show that was geared toward young adult females. It was produced and distributed by Sony Pictures Television as well as regarded as the successor to Ricki Lake and lasted only one season, from September 13, 2004, to March 25, 2005, with repeats until September 9, 2005, and was replaced by The Tyra Banks Show the following Monday.

== Background ==
The hour-long program was hosted by Jules Asner, Kimora Lee Simmons, Cynthia Garrett, and Lynne Koplitz. A cutesy ad campaign gave all four co-hosts corresponding adjectives. Jules was "stylish and sophisticated", Cynthia was "smart and single mom", Lynne was "frank and funny" and Kimora was "outspoken and outrageous."

It was also intended to be an alternative to The View and to a certain extent fill the void left by Ricki Lake after she passed on doing a twelfth season. Like The View, this program in particular offered lifestyle tips and topics ranging from fashion ideas to relationship advice, but at the same time tried to target a young urban audience that worked successfully during Lake's tenure, however was later replaced by The Tyra Banks Show.

Unfortunately, the concept and difficult time slots in various markets, along with former Lake viewers having moved on to other offerings in syndication such as Warner Bros.’ The Larry Elder Show which aired in the same spot as Ricki Lake in some markets, specifically The WB 100+ Station Group where they aired Larry Elder’s show instead of Life & Style in Ricki’s old timeslot on The WB 100+ but it ended up getting replaced by Tyra in fall 2005. as well as airing the show on Oxygen, would take its toll on the program, resulting in Sony canceling Life & Style in March 2005 and ultimately ended up replaced by Warner Bros. Domestic Television Distribution’s new talk show The Tyra Banks Show the following September in most markets especially The WB 100+ Station Group where Tyra made a better attempt to succeeding Ricki Lake with the same producers but with a different studio.

Controversy would also contribute to the program's demise as well. In the Page Six article of the New York Post, it was reported that Kimora Lee Simmons was difficult to work with, including one incident in which Simmons individually licked every doughnut on the catering table as so no one else could eat them. Simmons later told Vanity Fair of making the show, "I wasn't used to having a boss."

== Production notes ==
The series was nominated for Outstanding achievement in Main Title Design in the 2005 Daytime Emmy Awards.
