= Ted Kurdyla =

American film producer

Ted Kurdyla is an American film, television and stage producer.

Kurdyla attended Mater Dei High School.

== Career ==
=== 1980s ===
Kurdyla began his film career as the location manager for the Brian De Palma film Blow Out, starring John Travolta. The following year, he served as assistant unit production manager on Fighting Back, which starred Tom Skerritt. In 1984, Kurdyla worked as the production liaison for the New York unit of Once Upon a Time in America, which was directed by Sergio Leone and starred Robert De Niro.

In 1985, Kurdyla served as assistant unit production manager on the Michael Cimino film Year of the Dragon, starring Mickey Rourke. The following year, he was production manager on the Robert Downey Sr. film America. In 1987 he was unit manager on *batteries not included, starring Hume Cronyn and Jessica Tandy. In 1988, Kurdyla was the production manager on the documentary Imagine: John Lennon, assistant unit production manager for Bright Lights, Big City, starring Michael J. Fox, and unit production manager for the Bud Yorkin comedy Arthur 2: On the Rocks, which starred Dudley Moore and Liza Minnelli. Kurdyla was the associate producer of the Walter Hill crime drama Johnny Handsome in 1989, starring Mickey Rourke, and ended the decade with the Chevy Chase comedy Fletch Lives, on which he served as production manager.

=== 1990s ===
In 1990, Kurdyla was the production manager for the Robin Williams/Tim Robbins comedy Cadillac Man. In 1992 he was the unit production manager for Final Analysis, which starred Richard Gere and Kim Basinger. In 1993, Kurdyla began producing television programs, serving that year as producer for Trouble Shooters: Trapped Beneath the Earth, starring Kris Kristofferson, then as co-producer for The Cosby Mysteries in 1994.

Also in 1994, Kurdyla produced the television sequel to Alfred Hitchcock's The Birds, titled The Birds II: Land's End, featuring the star of the original film, Tippi Hedren. In 1996 he produced another television thriller, Twilight Man, which starred Tim Matheson. Toward the close of the decade, Kurdyla returned to theatrical cinema and served as executive producer for Fallen, starring Denzel Washington (1998), and, in 1999, was co-executive producer of The Confession, starring Ben Kingsley and Alec Baldwin.

=== 2000s ===
Kurdyla continued working as executive producer of both film and television, beginning with the war drama Tigerland, directed by Joel Schumacher, and then the Bette Midler/Nathan Lane comedy Isn't She Great, both in 2000. In 2002, Kurdyla was executive producer for Schumacher's Phone Booth, starring Colin Farrell. From 2003–2005, Kurdyla produced two television mini-series for the USA Network: Helen of Troy (2003) and Spartacus (2004). In 2005, Kurdyla produced and directed World S.U.M.O. Challenge: Battle of the Giants for the ESPN network.

=== 2010s ===
In 2010, Kurdyla entered the world of theater, teaming up with writer/director Charles Messina and serving as executive producer for the staged reading of the Vincent Gogliormella/Messina comedy 'Twas the Night Before a Brooklyn Christmas, which starred Mario Cantone and which was also directed by Messina. Later that year, Kurdyla executive produced a staged reading of the Messina penned and directed comedy A Room of My Own, starring Ralph Macchio, Cantone, and Gina Ferranti. In 2011, a play titled The Wanderer about the life of Dion (in collaboration with the singer himself) was scheduled to debut in New York City, with Kurdyla serving as executive producer and Messina signed on as writer and director.

=== Teaching career ===
In the 1970s and early 1980s, Kurdyla taught in the Matawan-Aberdeen Regional School District, where he directed the district's performing arts program. He took a five-month leave in 1981, in the wake of a suit against the school board, which denied him an administrator position. He did not return to teaching when the leave was up. He also had taught in the district's Lloyd Road Middle School.

== List of credits ==
Year	Title	Type	Role	Studio
1981	Blow Out	Film	Location Manager	Filmways
1982	Fighting Back	Film	Assistant Unit Production Manager	Paramount
1984	Once Upon a Time in America	Film	Production Liaison: New York	Warner Brothers
1985	Year of the Dragon	Film	Assistant Unit Production Manager: North America	MGM/United Artists
1986	America	Film	Production Manager	ASA Communications, Sony
1987	*batteries not included	Film	Unit Manager	Amblin, Universal
1988	Imagine: John Lennon	Film	Production Manager	Warner Brothers
1988	Bright Lights, Big City	Film	Assistant Unit Production Manager	United Artists
1988	Arthur 2: On the Rocks	Film	Unit Production Manager: New York	Warner Brothers
1989	Johnny Handsome	Film	Associate Producer	Carolco, Tri-Star
1989	Fletch Lives	Film	Production Manager	Universal
1990	Cadillac Man	Film	Associate Producer	Orion Pictures
1992	Final Analysis	Film	Unit Production Manager	Warner Brothers
1993	Trouble Shooters: Trapped Beneath the Earth	Television	Producer	NBC
1994	The Cosby Mysteries	Television	Co-Producer	NBC
1994	The Birds II: Land's End	Television	Producer	Showtime
1996	Twilight Man	Television	Producer, Unit Production Manager	MCA/Universal
1998	Fallen	Film	Executive Producer	Warner Brothers
1999	The Confession	Film	Co-Executive Producer, Unit Production Manager	Conprod Inc., New City Releasing
2000	Tigerland	Film	Executive Producer	20th Century Fox
2000	Isn't She Great	Film	Executive Producer, Unit Production Manager, Second Unit Director	MCA/Universal
2002	Phone Booth	Film	Executive Producer, Unit Production Manager	20th Century Fox
2003	Helen of Troy	Television	Producer	Universal/USA Cable Entertainment
2004	Spartacus	Television	Producer, Unit Production Manager	Universal/USA Cable Entertainment
2005	World S.U.M.O. Challenge: Battle of the Giants	Television	Producer, director	ESPN
2010	'Twas the Night Before a Brooklyn Christmas	Theatrical play (staged reading)	Executive Producer	n/a
2010	A Room of My Own	Theatrical play, film (staged reading)	Executive Producer	n/a
2012	Untitled Dion DiMucci Project	Theatrical play, film	Executive Producer	n/a
