= Amir Darvish =

American actor

Amir Darvish is an American actor. He played singer Freddie Mercury in the Off Broadway 1997 play Mercury: The Afterlife and Times of a Rock God. In 2003, after two runs of the play in 1997 and 1998, the show's producers mounted it again in New York City, with Darvish playing the role of Mercury and play author Charles Messina directing. The show moved to the Triad Theater (also in New York City) in January, 2004. BackStage said of Darvish's performance: "Amir Darvish brings an almost Shakespearean theatricality, sardonic humor, and passionate intensity to his interpretation ... Darvish...keeps you riveted throughout ... Darvish sustains the illusion right till the end in bravura fashion." Darvish is of Persian descent.

== Filmography ==
- The American Astronaut (2001)
- Open Cam (2005)
- The Pink Panther (2006)
- Confessions (2006)
- The Atlas Mountains (2009)
- October Haze (2009)
- Trooper (2010)
- Month to Month (2011)

== Other appearances ==
Darvish has appeared on several television shows, including Spin City, NYPD Blue, Law & Order, and most recently TV You Control: Bar Karma. In 2008, he appeared as Hossain in the video game Grand Theft Auto IV. In 2010, he won the New York Innovative Theatre Award for Outstanding Actor in a Featured Role for his performance in the play Psych.
