= Dan Schneider (writer) =

American film critic, poet, writer (born 1965)

- Born: 1965 (age 60–61); Minnesota, U.S.
- Education: Franklin K. Lane High School
- Occupation: Writer
- Spouse: Jessica Schneider
- Writing career
- Period: 1984–present
- Genres: Poetry, criticism, fiction

Dan Schneider (born 1965) is an American poet and critic of literature and film who runs the criticism and literary website Cosmoetica. He has written dozens of novels and short story collections along with thousands of essays and poems.

== Biography ==
Schneider was born in 1965 to a family from Minnesota and Superior, Wisconsin. He is of Norwegian ancestry. His parents placed him for adoption, and he grew up with a working-class family in the Glendale-Ridgewood neighborhoods of Queens, New York. He claimed to have witnessed a murder at age six. He attended Franklin K. Lane High School, where he was part of a gang. After graduating from high school, he began writing poetry to court women while he was working as a dairy manager in a Finast grocery store. In 1987, he paid to print 2,000 copies of his first poetry book, Od Infinitum.

In 1991, he and his adopted mother moved to Minnesota after learning that his biological family lived there, although his birth mother had died. While living in Minneapolis-Saint Paul, Schneider became involved in local poetry readings and poetry slams. He heavily criticized the poetry community in the Twin Cities, and journalist Brad Zellar noted that Schneider's criticisms sometimes involved personal attacks and public confrontations, including an instance in which Schneider interrupted an event for Robert Bly. He was kicked out of a local poetry group and also banned from some poetry readings and venues because of his outbursts and interruptions during events.

== Writings ==
Schneider has reportedly written "30 novels, 15 short story collections, 300 short stories, 1,300 essays, and thousands of poems," with many of these published on his Cosmoetica website. His writings have also been published in outlets including Monsters and Critics, HackWriters, and BlogCritics. In 2008, the literature textbook Contemporary Fiction: The Novel Since 1990 excerpted Schneider's negative review of British author Zadie Smith's novel White Teeth for HackWriters alongside a positive review from The New York Times as part of a discussion assignment on divided opinions among book reviewers.

== Cosmoetica website ==
Schneider runs the website Cosmoetica, which the Dictionary of Midwestern Literature included in a list of several significant Illinois-based literary magazines outside of academia. New York Times poetry columnist David Orr featured the site in the 2004 article "Where to Find Digital Lit" alongside 16 other online-only literary sites, including Bookslut, FanFiction.net, and Foetry.com.

Schneider also publishes interviews on his site with authors, poets, scientists and others such as James Berardinelli, James Emanuel, and Chris Impey. In the introduction to a special edition of Fire!!! The Multimedia Journal of Black Studies, Ronald Bailey noted Schneider's interview with Emanuel as an "important source" on the poet. An Emanuel quote from the interview also appeared in the poet's New York Times obituary.

== Critical response ==
Several writers have commented on Schneider's critical writings on Cosmoetica. In the Quarterly Literary Review Singapore, Cyril Wong wrote: "I think it is high time every lover of contemporary poetry reads Dan Schneider's essays," which he described as "literary entertainment of the most vindictive and oddly cathartic kind." Writing in The New York Times, David Orr said of Schneider and Cosmoetica: "If you were looking for someone willing to call T. S. Eliot '1 of the most grossly overrated writers in the history of the world, & the English language,' Schneider is your man. His site includes similarly jolly commentary on a large number of contemporary writers." Roger Ebert wrote a 2009 blog post on RogerEbert.com responding to Schneider's positive and negative assessments of his critical style and calling Schneider a "considerable critic."

Schneider's poetry has been praised by Waswo X. Waswo.
