= Open Cam =

- Directed by: Robert Gaston
- Written by: Robert Gaston
- Produced by: Robert Gaston; Farrel Lever
- Starring: Andreau Thomas; Amir Darvish
- Cinematography: Doug Gritzmacher
- Music by: Houston Bernard; Warren Cuccurullo; George Draguns; Jerry Walterick
- Production company: Lil Coal's Big Pictures
- Release dates: October 20, 2005 (Reel Affirmations International Gay and Lesbian Film Festival); August 30, 2006 (DVD)
- Running time: 101 minutes
- Country: United States
- Language: English

Open Cam is a 2005 American comedy-drama film directed by Robert Gaston, starring Andreau Thomas and Amir Darvish. It was released on DVD the following year by Wolfe Video.

== Cast ==
- Andreau Thomas as Manny Yates
- Amir Darvish as Hamilton
- Ben Green as Maurice
- Matt Cannon as Conrad
- Christian Jones as Chris
- Reiner Prochaska as Pierce
- John Geoffrion as Bill
- Ryan Thrasher as Trevor
- Vincent Bradberry as John

== Reception ==
Dennis Harvey of Variety wrote that the film is "heavier on sex appeal than suspense" and conveys "little sense of place".

Phil Hall of Film Threat wrote that the film "isn't thrilling", the "wildly untalented" cast has "no clue how respond to the parameters of a crime drama", and Gaston is "unable to disguise the poverty of the production". Bay Windows' Brian Jewell criticized the film for its lack of consistency. Jewell also praised Darvish's performance amid the otherwise weak cast.
