= The Birds II: Land's End =

1994 American television film

- VHS cover
- Genre: Action; Adventure; Horror
- Based on: "The Birds" by Daphne du Maurier
- Written by: Ken and Jim Wheat; Robert Eisele
- Directed by: Rick Rosenthal (Note: Credited as Alan Smithee.)
- Starring: Brad Johnson; Chelsea Field; James Naughton; Jan Rubes; Tippi Hedren
- Music by: Ron Ramin
- Country of origin: United States
- Original language: English

Production
- Executive producer: David A. Rosemont
- Producer: Ted Kurdyla
- Cinematography: Bruce Surtees
- Editor: Maryann Brandon
- Running time: 87 minutes
- Production companies: MCA Television Entertainment; Rosemont Productions International

Original release
- Network: Showtime
- Release: March 14, 1994

Related
- The Birds

The Birds II: Land's End is a 1994 American made-for-television action-horror film directed by Rick Rosenthal, credited to Alan Smithee. The film is a standalone sequel to the 1963 film The Birds, directed by Alfred Hitchcock. The Birds II: Land's End stars Brad Johnson, Chelsea Field, and James Naughton. Tippi Hedren, who starred in The Birds, appears in a minor role different from the one she played in the original film. The original music score was composed by Ron Ramin. It premiered on Showtime on March 14, 1994.

== Plot ==
30 years after the events of the first film, a group of seagulls stand together on a coast. A fisherman uses his net to take a dead bird from the water, unaware of a swarm of seagulls flying toward his boat. Crows join the seagulls to attack and kill the fisherman.

The birds fly over a boat where Ted and Mary Hocken move to a remote, windswept, tiny East Coast island named Gull Island with their two young daughters, Jill and Joanna, and their pet dog. The Hocken family is determined to forget their son Tommy's death and spend a quiet, uneventful summer, with Ted hoping to complete an important biology thesis. The family drive together to a new house, which Jill and Joanna are happy about. While on the beach, Jill, Joanna and their dog notice that the small boat is still floating on the water. Ted joins them until Mary calls them to come in.

Later that night, Ted has a nightmare about losing Tommy in a car accident. Mary comforts her husband. Ted enters his daughters' bedroom and gives them a kiss on their foreheads.

The next day, Ted, Mary, Jill and Joanna enter the small town, unaware of a policeman using his boat to drag the abandoned boat. Ted and Mary meet Frank in an office. Later, Ted and his two daughters go into a small shop and meet Helen, who owns the shop. Jill and Joanna leave the shop while Helen and Ted talk to each other until Joanna calls Ted. Everyone goes outside and see the policeman with the fisherman's boat.

Ted calls their two daughters to come and have dinner as they depart from the playground. Mary makes dinner until the dog comes back with a small bird in its mouth, which they put in a box.

Ted watches the sea as Jill and Joanna go on a bike ride. Later, Ted works on his thesis, but notices the pole on the front porch is semi-ruined and decides to paint the house. As Ted paints the old stone bell, a seagull knocks him off the ladder. Jill and Joanna walk toward him with the dog. Ted tells his two daughters to leave. Realizing he has blood on his forehead, Ted puts on a bandage. When Mary and Frank arrive at the house, she notices the bandage.

Later, Jill, Joanna and their dog walk toward the beach where they find a dead bird and the fisherman's corpse. Both sisters are frightened upon seeing the fisherman without his eyes. They run away from him as birds fly up into the sky. The sisters are stopped by an older man, Karl. The fisherman's corpse is taken into an ambulance as Ted and Mary join their daughters. Ted talks to the town doctor, Doc Rayburn, and Frank to ask what happened to the fisherman. Karl picks the dead bird up and puts it in his bag.

That night, the Hocken family have a conversation about Tommy's death. After their daughters fall asleep, Mary and Ted continue the conversation. Ted goes downstairs to the kitchen to get a drink, but he hears a strange noise outside. A crow smashes the glass door and wounds Ted's right hand. Mary runs to the kitchen and sees what happened.

The next day, Ted has a cloth wrapped around his palm. Ted meets Helen at the small shop, who sees his hand. Ted lies that he cut his hand on glass by accident. Jill and Joanna walk to the lighthouse, where Karl asks them what they're doing. Both sisters are frightened and run away.

Later that night, Joanna feeds the small bird with a French fry, for which Jill teases her until the small bird flies away. They run downstairs and attempt to get it back, but they discover the back window is open and the small bird has already left. Upset that they couldn't get the bird back, Ted and Mary comfort their two daughters. Later, on the front porch, Ted and Mary spend time together, both unaware of the crows standing on the metal tube.

Jill and Joanna want Ted to ride bikes with them the next day, but he's too busy working. Jill and Joanna are both disappointed, so Ted changes his mind and goes outside with his two daughters. In the office, Mary attempts to call her husband. Ted, Jill and Joanna are riding their bikes together toward their home, unaware of Karl in a boat, holding the dead bird. Mary feels disappointed that Ted didn't answer the phone. She and Frank eat together at the restaurant. Mary mentions that she lost her son five years ago, but she couldn't blame her husband for their son's death.

Mary drives back home as Ted waits for her. Ted doesn't understand Mary's relationship with Frank. They both confront each other. Ted hears a ringing noise from the door; it's Karl with a fish. The Hocken family agree to have dinner with him. Karl tells them a story and greets Jill and Joanna. Ted and Karl then go outside and talk.

The next day, Mary and Frank are both working in the office at the computer when he accidentally kisses her. Not wanting to cheat on her husband, she walks away from the computer. Frank apologizes for kissing her.

Later that night, both sisters are sleeping until they find the small bird standing on their window. They open the window and let the bird in, putting it back in its cage. More birds come through the window, attacking Jill and Joanna. Hearing them calling for help, Ted and Mary open the door and are shocked by the birds attacking their two daughters. The parents come to Jill and Joanna's rescue by covering them with a sheet and escaping out the bedroom while Ted fights the birds off.

The next day, Ted puts the wooden boards on the window as protection from the birds. The Hocken family bury the deceased birds. Jill tells her mother that Frank is calling. Mary is talking to Frank on the telephone while Ted enters the house. Ted and Mary have a serious conversation as Karl drives toward the house. Ted and Karl discuss the birds' behavior, then go to the restaurant and confront Doc Rayburn and a hunter about Jill and Joanna being attacked, showing them some dead birds. Ted and Karl leave the restaurant and walk toward the dock while talking.

Back home, Ted looks for his family, who are also just arriving home. Ted forces his family to go into the house before the birds attack them again. Mary, Jill and Joanna sleep together on the bed while Ted puts more wooden boards on the windows. Later, Ted falls asleep on the couch. The next morning, Mary watches him sleep before he wakes up. Mary drags her husband with her and swims in the water, having a good time together.

Ted goes to the lighthouse where Karl is watching a group of seagulls. Karl tells Ted about the events from the original movie, "The Birds". Back home, Ted explains to Mary about how, 30 years ago, people were attacked by a swarm of birds in Bodega Bay, California.

Later that night, Joanna goes outside to look for the dog. Ted and Mary are having a private moment until Jill interrupts them. They both realize that Joanna has gone outside. Panicking, Ted quickly goes outside to look for her. One of the birds almost scratches Joanna's face until the dog saves her life by biting the bird, causing all of the birds to fly into the air. Ted quickly takes her back into the house as the birds peck the dog to death. Ted uses the shovel to stop the birds from attacking the dog. He lifts it up and runs into the house. The Hocken family stay in the living room as the birds start pecking at the front of the house. Mary attempts to call someone, but it doesn't work as one of the birds disables power to the house. The Hocken family watch the front door being pecked by birds until Ted blocks it with his desk. The birds eventually fly away from the house. In the lighthouse, Karl sees a swarm of birds flying around. The birds break through the glass window and attack him, causing him to fall off the lighthouse.

The next day, the Hocken family mourns and buries their deceased pet dog. They attempt to escape from the house, but the birds broke the car. Jill and Joanna ask if Karl can take them to town. Ted goes to the lighthouse, where he finds Karl's corpse without his eyes. Meanwhile, a woman enters the restaurant to see Doc Rayburn and tells him that he's supposed to help the people who got hurt. The townspeople are frightened by the birds who have taken over the town.

The Hocken family drive to town, but they discover that the birds are there too. At the restaurant, Doc Rayburn and the hunter help Frank, whose face got attacked. Doc Rayburn and two hunters come to talk to the Hocken family on the dock. The birds start attacking people as Doc Rayburn and the two hunters shoot them. Helen gets into a boat with a few adults and attempts to call the Hocken family, who don't hear her as they run. Doc Rayburn attempts to jump into the boat, but falls into the water.

The Hocken family keep running as one of the men shoots a bird, which starts a fire that grows and spreads over the front deck with a few wooden boxes. Ted and Mary cover their two daughters as the fire touches the wooden box and starts to explode. A few men and Frank get blown into the air as they are hit by the huge explosion. The Hocken family get to a boat, discovering a swarm of seagulls on the coast. Mary and their two daughters get into the water while Ted flips the boat. Ted, Mary and Jill swim under the boat, where Mary discovers Joanna isn't with them. Ted finds Joanna and brings her back. The family stay under the boat, listening to the birds pecking on the boat, until they notice the swarm of birds flying away. The Hocken family smile at the flying birds in the sky.

== Cast ==
- Brad Johnson as Ted Hocken
- Chelsea Field as Mary Hocken
- James Naughton as Frank Irvin
- Jan Rubes as Karl
- Tippi Hedren as Helen
- Stephanie Milford as Jill Hocken
- Megan Gallacher as Joanna Hocken
- Richard K. Olsen as Doc Rayburn

== Reception ==
The television film received negative reviews. Ken Tucker of Entertainment Weekly panned the film, especially criticizing the writing and acting: "The actors in Birds II have little to do except widen their eyes in terror, and even that seems a daunting stretch" for Brad Johnson. He also commented on the fact that it was an Alan Smithee film, the pseudonym used when a director wants to disown the final film.

=== Tippi Hedren's response ===
Tippi Hedren, who starred as Melanie Daniels in the original film, returned in a supporting role as a different character named Helen. Hedren was disappointed that she did not have a larger part: "I wish that it was more than a cameo. I think they made a mistake by not doing that. But it has helped me to feed my lions and tigers". When asked what Alfred Hitchcock's opinion would have been, she answered: "I'd hate to think what he would say!" In a 2002 interview, Hedren described the film as "a horrible experience", expanding on this response in a 2007 interview by stating: "It's absolutely horrible, it embarrasses me horribly."

== Home video ==
The Birds II: Land's End was released on VHS and LaserDisc in the United States in 1994 by MCA/Universal Home Video and reissued on VHS in 1997 via GoodTimes Home Video. Because the film was so unpopular, it received a limited DVD release by Elephant Films in France, Prooptiki in Bulgaria (Limited to 500 copies), and by KSM in Germany.

In August 2022, Vinegar Syndrome released a 2K restoration of the film scanned from the 35mm interpositive on Blu-ray. The Vinegar Syndrome release also contained all-new special features, including an audio commentary track with film historians Amanda Reyes and Sam Pancake, a one-hour making-of documentary, and interviews with composer Ron Ramin and production assistant Craig Edwards. The release was limited to 6,000 copies.

== In popular culture ==
- The Birds II: Land's End was parodied as The Crows in the CBC sitcom Schitt's Creek.

== See also ==
- Birdemic: Shock and Terror
