= Richard Vetere =

American dramatist

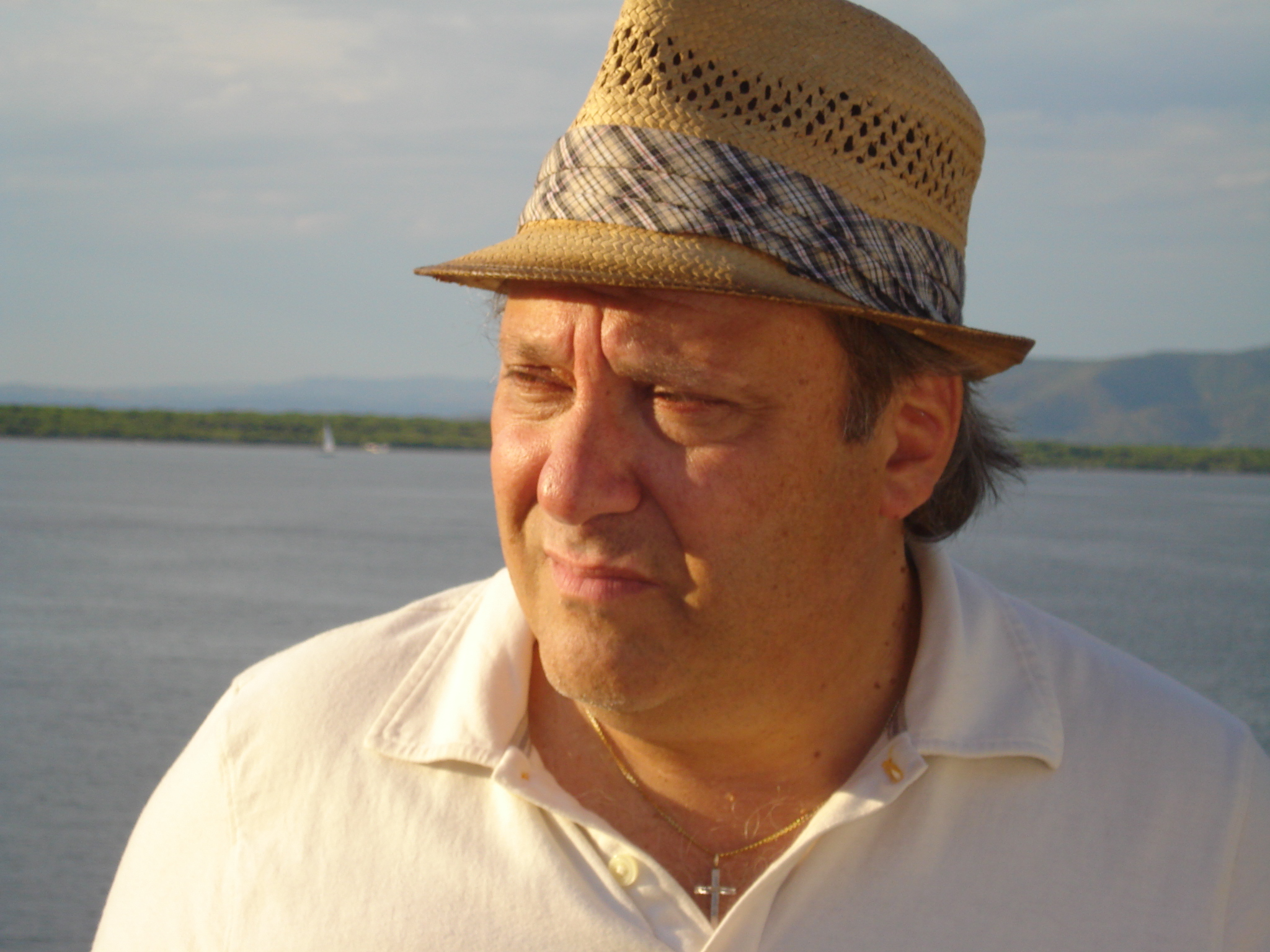
- Born: January 23, 1952 (age 74); New York City, U.S.
- Education: Columbia University
- Occupations: Playwright; screenwriter; television writer; poet; actor

Richard Vetere (born January 15, 1952) is an American playwright, screenwriter, television writer, poet, and actor.

== Career ==
Born in 1952, Vetere grew up in Maspeth, Queens, New York City, a setting that appears in several of his plays. He graduated from Columbia University with a master's degree in comparative literature and has published several poetry collections, including Memories of Human Hands and A Dream of Angels.

Vetere's plays have been produced Off-Broadway, regionally, and internationally. His works include The Engagement, Coupla Bimbos Sittin' Around Talkin, Gangster Apparel, Caravaggio, Machiavelli, and One Shot, One Kill, all published by Dramatic Publishing. In 1983, his play Rockaway Boulevard was reviewed by Michiko Kakutani in The New York Times, who wrote that "Vetere demonstrates the ability to mix the poetic with the colloquial."

Vetere's 1983 screenplay Vigilante was made into a feature film starring Robert Forster and Carol Lynley, which became the 20th highest-grossing film of that year.

In 1994, his play Hale the Hero! was broadcast by A&E as part of the General Motors Plays' Theater Series, starring Elisabeth Shue and Kevin Anderson, with an introduction by Lauren Bacall.

Vetere's Off-Broadway production of The Marriage Fool was adapted into a CBS television movie starring Walter Matthau, Carol Burnett, John Stamos, and Teri Polo. It became the highest-rated TV movie of 1998 and was later released in Europe under the title Love After Death in 2004. His Off-Broadway production How to Go on a Date in Queens was adapted into a film featuring Jason Alexander, Kimberly Williams-Paisley, Ron Perlman, and Rob Estes.

Vetere has written for several television series, including Dellaventura for CBS starring Danny Aiello. He also served as story editor for Threat Matrix on ABC and Disney, and sold a television pilot, The Wonder, to CBS with executive producer George Clooney.

His novel The Third Miracle was published in 1997 by Carroll & Graf and later in paperback by Simon & Schuster. It was translated into multiple languages and selected for the Book of the Month Club in Spain and Poland. The novel was adapted into a 2000 film produced by Francis Ford Coppola, directed by Agnieszka Holland, and starring Ed Harris and Anne Heche. In 2008, The Third Miracle was screened at the Museum of Modern Art (MoMA) in New York City as part of a retrospective of Holland's work.

Vetere has been a long-time member of the New York Playwrights Lab, founded by Israel Horovitz in 1975. Horovitz described him in Newsday as "a man with a writer's soul."

Vetere has taught at New York University (master's program in screenwriting), Queens College, and Montclair State University (introduction to screenwriting). He also founded a playwriting class at The Lang College at The New School and has participated in the mentoring program at Columbia University.

In 2005, Stony Brook University archived Vetere's works and correspondence from 1967 to 2001.

In October 2007, his musical Be My Love: The Mario Lanza Story, based on the life of singer Mario Lanza, premiered at the Tilles Center for the Performing Arts in Greenvale, New York. It was directed by Charles Messina and produced by Sonny Grosso and Phil Ramone.

In 2012, Vetere was elected to the Writers Guild of America East Freelance Council and named a lifetime member of the Guild. His third volume of poetry, The Other Colors in a Snow Storm, was published by Bordighera Press. His play Last Day was produced at Gloucester Stage, and his play Caravaggio was translated into Italian and performed in Rome, Porto Ercole, and Capri. His young adult play Bird Brain was later published, and he performed his one-person storytelling piece Love the Night at DR Lounge.

He also served as artist-in-residence at the Culture Project during the summer of 2012 for IMPACT 2012.

Vetere's novel The Writers Afterlife was published by Three Rooms Press in 2014. His play The Kids Menu was later adapted into a film starring Vincent Pastore. His most recent novel, Champagne and Cocaine, was published by Three Rooms Press and is set in New York City in 1981.
