= Charles Messina =

American playwright, screenwriter and theatre director

- Born: Charles Messina; October 21, 1971 (age 54); Greenwich Village, New York, U.S.
- Occupations: Playwright, screenwriter, theatre director

Charles Messina (born October 21, 1971, in Greenwich Village, New York) is an American playwright, screenwriter, theatre director and co-founder of NahNotOutsideMyHouse! Productions. He is of Italian-American descent. He attended Xavier High School and New York University.

== Career ==
=== 1990s–2000s ===
Messina's most notable stage work is the off-Broadway play Mercury: The Afterlife and Times of a Rock God, a monodrama written and directed by Messina about Queen front man Freddie Mercury, which starred Khalid Gonçalves and Amir Darvish.

Messina's other biographical works include Cirque Jacqueline, about the life of Jacqueline Kennedy Onassis (written by and starred Andrea Reese), and the autobiographical one-man show The Accidental Pervert (written and performed by Andrew Goffman and directed by Messina).

In 1999, Actor Found Dead, a one-act play written and directed by Messina about actor James Hayden (who Messina had seen in American Buffalo as a child), debuted at the John Houseman Studio Theatre in New York City. The play starred Khalid Gonçalves as Hayden, with Andrew I. Mones and David B. Martin. A screenplay based on Hayden's life was optioned in late 2007.

In the fall of 2006, the Messina-penned film They're Just My Friends was released, starring Lord Jamar, Malik Yoba, and Bruce Altman.

In August 2007, Messina directed Two-Mur Humor, which was an official entry in the 2007 Fringe Festival in NYC.

In 2007, Messina also directed the big budget musical Be My Love: The Mario Lanza Story, written by Richard Vetere. It was about the life of singer Mario Lanza, which was produced by Sonny Grosso and Phil Ramone. It premiered at The Tilles Center for the Performing Arts in Greenvale, New York.

Additionally in 2007, Messina's play Merging starring Jason Cerbone and Ernest Mingione, won Best Play in The Players' Theater's Shortened Attention Span Theater Festival in Greenwich Village. A film version of the play Merging was released in 2009.

Messina has directed the off-Broadway shows Rockaway Boulevard by Richard Vetere, The Accidental Pervert by Andrew Goffman, Art Metrano's Accidental Comedy, and a staged reading of his own script Younger starring Joe Piscopo.

In 2008, Messina's play Homelandpremiered, starring The Sopranos actors Dan Grimaldi, Jason Cerbone, Joe Lisi and Amir Darvish.

Messina co-wrote the book My Father, My Don (2008), in collaboration with Tony Napoli, about the life of Genovese Capo James "Jimmy Nap" Napoli and his son Tony Napoli.

=== 2010s–2020s ===
In May 2010, Messina directed and co-wrote (along with Vincent Gogliormella) the script Twas The Night Before a Brooklyn Christmas, starring Mario Cantone, Michael Rispoli and Robert Cuccioli at 45 Bleecker Street.

On September 20, 2010, a staged reading of Messina's semi-autobiographical play A Room of My Own, about an Italian American family living in Greenwich Village in the late 1970s, was performed from The Theatre at 45 Bleecker Street in Greenwich Village with Ralph Macchio, Cantone, Lynne Koplitz, Johnny Tammaro, John Barbieri and Kendra Jain.

In 2011, the film Spy was released, starring Vincent Pastore, Frank Vincent and Ben Curtis. Messina was co-author of the film's screenplay.

From March 29 until April 1, 2012, three of Messina's plays (Merging, Fugazy and Sick Bastids under the title The Tenement Plays), were performed at the 13th St Repertory Theater.

On November 13, 2012, a second reading of the play was done at 45 Bleecker Street, starring Cantone, Rachel Dratch, Zach Galligan and Mike Barbieri, as well as Tammaro and Jain.

Twilight Theatre Productions performed three of Messina's plays (Thompson Street, Lilac and Fugazy) from June 21 until August 2, 2013, at Kenlake State Resort Park in Hardin, KY.

On September 22, 2013, The Abingdon Theatre hosted a special reading of three of Messina's plays (Fairies, Thompson Street and Sinkhole), as part of a fundraiser for the theater. The cast included (in alphabetical order): Michael Barbieri, Anthony DeSando, Alfredo Diaz, Nick Fondulis, Khalid Gonçalves, Steven LaChioma, Tom Alan Robbins, Scott Seidman and Johnny Tammaro.

According to BroadwayWorld, Fairies was "so beloved by audiences" that The Abingdon Theatre decided to produce the show again, on December 17, 2013. The entire original cast returned.

On November 16, 2014, three new one-act plays by Messina were read at The Abingdon Theatre as part of their weekly Sunday Series. The plays, titled A Mooney for the Misbegotten, Fifteen Minutes of Shame and Chubby & Glen featured actors Jason Cerbone, Anthony DeSando, Mary Dimino, Nick Fondulis, Valerie Smaldone, Johnny Tammaro and Michael Townsend Wright.

The Abingdon Theatre hosted another reading of Messina's one-act trilogies on March 22, 2015. Titled Three from the Neighborhood, the evening marked the debut of Dewey, Phukum & Howe, The Neighborhood and The Wreck. The cast featured Michael Barbieri, Rosie DeSanctis, Anthony DeSando, Alfredo Diaz, Mary Dimino, Nick Fondulis, Lynne Koplitz, Khalid Gonçalves, Ernest Mingione, Kyle C. Mumford, Craig Rivela, Jonathan Smith, Johnny Tammaro and Michael Townsend Wright.

The Abingdon Theatre Company presented a reading of Messina's play A Room of My Own, starring Mario Cantone, Ralph Macchio, Joli Tribuzio, Tammaro, Barbieri, Jain, Antoinette LaVecchia and Michael Townsend Wright on April 21, 2015. The comedy was based on Messina's life growing up in Greenwich Village in the late 1970s.

The Abingdon Theatre committed to a full production of the play in spring 2016. "The autobiographical play is a bawdy, family comedy revolving around a writer telling the story of his life, as events and characters start to slowly slip away from his control". BroadwayWorld announced that the Abingdon Theatre was debuting the first full production of A Room of My Own, starring Cantone and Macchio. On February 13, 2016, it opened at the Abingdon Theatre. The show had a special limited-engagement run from February 19 until March 20, 2016.

Messina debuted True East, an urban Twilight Zone-esque podcast series set in the Greenwich Village of the 1980s. The series was produced by Hollywood veteran Craig Singer in conjunction with Sound Lounge's Marshall Grupp. It was narrated by actor Ralph Macchio.

=== The Wanderer ===
In 2011, Messina collaborated with Dion on a jukebox musical about the singer's life, titled The Wanderer – The Life and Music of Dion. Ted Kurdyla was the executive producer. The first reading of the play was performed at the Triad Theater in New York City on October 13, 2011. On September 13 and 14, 2018, the NYC workshop of The Wanderer took place at the Baryshnikov Arts Center. It was produced by Jill Menza and Messina, written by Messina and directed by Kenneth Ferrone. It starred Mike Wartella, Christy Altomare, Joey McIntyre, Johnny Tammaro, Joli Tribuzio, Lance Roberts and others.

In a December 9, 2011, interview with The New York Times, Messina explained why he chose Dion's story as a subject: "The conflict was irresistible to me as a dramatist. But what's interesting about Dion is that he lived. In my other plays, you don't have that ending where the guy overcame. Dion overcame."

On March 18, 2019, BroadwayWorld announced that The Wanderer would begin a run at New Jersey's Paper Mill Playhouse in the spring of 2020, before its eventual Broadway debut. Kenneth Ferrone was slated to direct it. However, due to the COVID-19 pandemic, the world premiere performance was rescheduled to March 24, 2022.

== List of credits ==
=== Plays ===
- Roman Candles (1995) – writer & director
- Mercury: The Afterlife and Times of a Rock God (1997) – writer & director
- Actor Found Dead (1999) – writer & director
- Rockaway Boulevard (2004) – director
- Cirque Jacqueline (2004–2008) – director
- The Accidental Pervert (2005–present) – director
- Younger (2006) – writer & director
- Two-Mur Humor (2007) – writer & director
- Be My Love: The Mario Lanza Story (2007) – director
- Accidental Comedy (2009) – director
- A Room of My Own (2009) – writer & director
- The Fatman Cometh (2011) – director
- Sick Bastids (2012) – writer
- Thompson Street (2013) – writer
- Lilac (2013) – writer
- Fugazy (2013) – writer
- An Honest Woman (2013) – writer & director
- Fairies (2013) – writer & director
- Thompson Street (2013) – writer & director
- Sinkhole (2013) – writer & director
- Chubby & Glen (2014) – writer & director
- Fifteen Minutes of Shame (2014) – writer & director
- A Mooney for the Misbegotten (2014) – writer & director
- Dewey, Phukum & Howe (2015) – writer & director
- The Neighborhood (2015) – writer & director
- The Wreck (2015) – writer & director
- Calm the Light (2016) – writer & director
- A Room of My Own (2016) – writer & director
- The Wanderer (2017) – writer & producer

=== Published plays ===
- Mercury: The Afterlife and Times of a Rock God by Original Works Publishing (2009)
- Three Plays by Charles Messina (Fugazy, Klepto and Merging) by The Beckham Publications Group (2011)

=== Films ===
- They're Just My Friends (2006) – co-writer
- Merging (2009) – screenwriter & director
- Spy (2011) – co-writer
- Choose (2011) – associate producer
- Thompson Street (2015) – writer

=== Books ===
- My Father, My Don (2008) – co-author Tony Nap Napoli by The Beckham Publications Group

=== Podcasts ===
- True East (series) (2015) – writer & director
