= Jason Cerbone =

American actor

- Jason Cerbone as Jackie Aprile, Jr. in The Sopranos
- Born: November 2, 1977 (age 49); Yonkers, New York, U.S.
- Education: Concordia College (BS)
- Occupation: Actor
- Years active: 1988–present
- Spouse: Beth Cerbone (m. 2004)
- Children: 2

Jason Cerbone (born November 2, 1977) is an American actor. He played Jackie Aprile Jr. on the HBO series The Sopranos, Lorenzo Desappio in Law & Order: Special Victims Unit (2012–2016), and Mikey O in Paper Soldiers (2002).

== Early life and education ==
Cerbone was born in Yonkers, New York. He got his start acting at age four, appearing on a commercial for Sesame Street. He signed with the Ford Modeling Agency in New York City at age seven. Cerbone later appeared in Bon Jovi's "Silent Night" music video, as well as the title character in Suzanne Vega's video for the song "Luka".

He attended Sacred Heart High School in Yonkers and Concordia College in Bronxville, New York, earning a Bachelor of Science degree in biology. After graduating from college, he resumed his acting career.

== Career ==
Cerbone portrayed Jackie Aprile Jr. in the HBO series The Sopranos. He also had an appearance in the movie Cloverfield, in which he played a New York police officer.

In 2007, Cerbone starred with Gina Ferranti and Ernest Mingione in Charles Messina's play Merging, which won Best Play in The Players' Theater's Shortened Attention Span Theater Festival in Greenwich Village. Cerbone also starred in the film version of Merging, which was released in 2009, and he made an appearance as an NYPD "ESU guy" in the 2009 film The Taking of Pelham 123. In 2014, he played the role of Detective Johnny Vassallo in the CBS crime drama Blue Bloods, season 5, episode 3 ("Burning Bridges").

== Filmography ==
=== Film ===
Year	Title	Role	Notes
1988	Spike of Bensonhurst	Gang Member	
1989	Collision Course		Uncredited
2002	Paper Soldiers	Mikey O	
2003	Shade	Young Stevens	
2004	Brando from the Neck Down	Soap Opera Executive	Short
2005	Deepwater	Sal	
2008	Cloverfield	Police Officer	
2009	The Taking of Pelham 123	ESU Guy	
2009	Merging	Frank Yale	Short
2018	Passaic	Jake	Short

=== Television ===
Year	Title	Role	Notes
2000–2001	The Sopranos	Jackie Aprile Jr.	12 episodes
2002	Third Watch	Kyle Prescott	2 episodes
2003	ER	Oliver	Episode: "The Greater Good"
2004	NYPD Blue	Officer Ted Keogh	Episode: "Dress for Success"
2005	Jonny Zero	L.D.	Episode: "Lost and Found"
2005	CSI: NY	Tony Reanetti	Episode: "The Closer"
2005	CSI: Miami	Steve Gabler	Episode: "48 Hours to Live"
2006	What I Like About You	Michael Meladeo	Episode: "Garden State"
2007	Law & Order: Criminal Intent	Rudy Ventano	Episode: "World's Fair"
2010	Law & Order	Bruce Tipton	Episode: "Brilliant Disguise"
2011	Breakout Kings	August Tillman	Episode: "Pilot"
2012–2016	Law & Order: Special Victims Unit	Lorenzo Desappio	8 episodes
2014	Unforgettable	Bobby D'Amato	Episode: "The Combination"
2014	Blue Bloods	Detective Johnny Vassallo	Episode: "Burning Bridges"
2014–2016	Power	Officer/Detective Ed Donato	5 episodes
2016	Shades of Blue	Agent	2 episodes
2016	Conviction	Anthony Scarlata	Episode: "A Simple Man"

=== Video games ===
Year	Title	Role	Notes
2009	Grand Theft Auto: The Ballad of Gay Tony	The Crowd of Liberty City	Voice
