= Joe Lovero =

American film director, playwright & screenwriter

Joe Lovero is an American film director, playwright and screenwriter.

== Career ==
In 1998, Joe wrote and directed a short film titled Puppet, Love and Mertz. Linda Spear of the NY Times wrote about the journey Joe took making his first film. The film shot in New York City starred Elisabeth Rohm (Law and Order), Ian Lithgow (3rd Rock From The Sun) and Francis Jue (M. Butterfly). It was Joe's first foray into writing and directing and had its premiere at the Tribeca Film Center in New York City.

Joe later directed and co-wrote the short film A Chubby Kid starring his co-writer Mat Young. A Chubby Kid made its debut at the Greenwich Film Festival in 2002 and was selected for several other American film festivals.

In August 2005 he sold his feature length screenplay Book of Leo to Universal Studios. Seann William Scott is attached to star in the film. Marc Platt who produced the film Legally Blonde and the Broadway smash Wicked is producing Book of Leo for Universal Studios. In the August 9, 2005 edition of Variety, Gabe Snyder wrote about Joe's journey from auto insurance rep to Hollywood screenwriter.

=== Redrum ===
Joe began work on "Redrum - The Unauthorized Musical Parody of The Shining" in 2009. He posted on Craigslist in search of a composer to work with and met eventual Redrum composer Jon Hugo Ungar. It was the first musical either of them had ever written. After several years developing the show, they decided to put their money where their mouths were and record song demos and film a scene from the show to promote the project. They landed three time Tony Award nominee Marc Kudisch to play Jack Torrance in the musical short film produced during the summer of 2013. Released on October 24, 2013, the Redrum teaser video, written and directed by Joe, parodies the scene from the film version of The Shining between Jack and Delbert Grady in The Overlook Hotel's red bathroom. The musical short features the original songs "Correct Them", "You've Turned On My Light" and a tango between Jack & Delbert Grady (played by Max Roll) that was choreographed by Shannon Lewis.
