= Robert Tallon =

- Born: September 21, 1932; Astoria, Queens, New York, US
- Died: December 1, 2015 (aged 83)
- Education: School of Visual Arts
- Known for: Cover art for magazines
- Notable work: The Thing in Dolores’ Piano; Rhoda’s Restaurant
- Website: roberttallon.com

Robert B. Tallon (September 21, 1932 – December 1, 2015) was an American painter, illustrator, writer, and singer. Between the late 1960s and mid-1980s, Tallon wrote and/or illustrated 18 books, most of which were picture books and alphabet books for children. He is also known for his magazine illustrations, especially his cover art for The New Yorker during the same period.

Tallon turned to painting and drawing after polio deprived him of his singing voice when he was a teenager. His work has been exhibited in the National Portrait Gallery at the Smithsonian Institution, and in the Museum of Fine Arts, Houston. He continued to paint until his death in 2015.

== Early life and education ==
Tallon was born in Astoria, Queens during the Great Depression. He and his family—which included his mother Anna and father Charles, brothers Charles Jr. and Bill, and sister Anne—moved house several times when he was growing up. Such was the economic climate of New York City during the Depression and wartime that the Tallon children helped earn money for the household by performing. Young Robert had a budding career as a singer, which led to an offer of a two-year scholarship at the Metropolitan Opera Studio. This opportunity was never realized, however, for Tallon contracted polio before he could attend. The infection developed into bulbar polio, a rare form of paralytic polio in which the polio virus spreads within the brain stem and damages nerves in the medulla. Because of this nerve damage, Tallon did not have enough control of muscles in his throat to sing as he could before. It was during his recovery that drawing and painting became his artistic outlet.

Tallon graduated from Franklin K. Lane High School in Brooklyn. He was drafted into the United States Army at age 20, but received a medical discharge less than nine months later due to post-polio syndrome. His service ended on October 31, 1953. He returned to New York and enrolled in the School of Visual Arts in Manhattan. This, too, was cut short by illness—this time, his father Charles'. Charles never recovered; he died in 1954.

== Career ==
Because of his father's illness and death, Tallon left the School of Visual Arts in order to help support his family financially. He went to work at an advertising agency, while also hustling as a freelance illustrator and making a name for himself as a painter.

=== Books ===
Through Holt, Rinehart and Winston (HRW), he published his first book in 1963: Conversations: Cries, Croaks, and Calls was an artist's book with cursive handwriting, full-page illustrations, and a satirical tone. This led to a commission from HRW to illustrate a new edition of Fables for the Fair, a fin de siècle collection of fables about European American women's lives in contemporary American (or, perhaps more specifically, New England) society. American writer/poet Josephine Daskam Bacon published the first edition circa 1901. Daskam Bacon died in 1961, a few years before the 1967 publication of the edition that Tallon illustrated.

Tallon's first picture book with a story was The Thing in Dolores’ Piano, which Bobbs-Merrill Company published in 1970. Picture books for children became a new direction for Tallon, who was then in his late thirties, and had never read any children's books as a child. He went on to write and/or illustrate more than a dozen picture books and alphabet books. The Brooklyn Museum awarded his book Rhoda's Restaurant (1973) the Brooklyn Art Books for Children Citation for 1975. His last picture book, Mooseberry and the Fuzzo Makers was published by Alfred A. Knopf in 1984.

Tallon's career in children's literature was aided by Miriam Chaikin, an editor at Bobbs-Merrill who was herself an accomplished children's writer. Chaikin edited Tallon's 1971 alphabet book Zoophabets, which was one of his first books for children. He dedicated his next alphabet book, Rotten Kidphabets (1975) to Chaikin, describing her as "a true friend".

=== Magazine illustration ===
In the mean time, Tallon's work in magazine illustration continued. He provided the cover of the 17 September 1973 issue of Time, for the cover story "Hamburger Empire" (about the McDonald's Corporation). (The original painting, titled McDonald's Hamburger, is now held by the US's National Portrait Gallery.) But, he is probably best known for his covers of The New Yorker. 33 were published in all, in the period 1974 through 1988. The first of these, The Boy with the Flute (9 December 1974), is a portrayal of Georgie Freewall, a boy who lived in the apartment next door to the Tallons in Rockaway, Queens. The Tallon family often heard the sound of Georgie's playing through the apartment wall. They felt great sympathy for him because a fall had left him brain-damaged.

After the magazine accepted and published the illustration, the editorial staff were surprised that Tallon did not promptly submit more artwork. They phoned him in January 1975 and explained that, as an approved contributor, he could start start bringing in new work every week. This began a relationship with the magazine that lasted for more than 13 years. What eventually brought it to a close was the replacement of editor William Shawn.

Shawn had been editor-in-chief of The New Yorker ever since he succeeded the magazine's late founder, Harold Ross, in 1951. The magazine flourished under Shawn's leadership. By 1985, however, the board of directors were worried about diminishing ad revenue despite high circulation. They sold the magazine to Advance Publications. In 1987, Advance Publications owner S. I. Newhouse Jr. hired Robert Gottlieb to replace Shawn as editor.

Gottlieb started publishing humorous cover art. Whereas Shawn used to prefer covers that were (as New Yorker art editor and cartoonist Lee Lorenz put it) "delicate and quietly amusing", Gottlieb had a fondness for jokes and visual puns. Along with Charlie Martin, Lonnie Sue Johnson, and Arthur Getz, Tallon was one of the long-time cover artists who were unable or unwilling to accommodate Gottlieb's taste. 1987 was the first year in Tallon's history with the magazine that The New Yorker did not publish one of his covers. Tallon did, however, publish one final New Yorker cover: the 28 March 1988 issue. It depicts three identical women (dressed in leotards and leg warmers) dancing with ribbons in an empty room. The final cover by Arthur Getz, the most prolific New Yorker cover artist of the 20th century, was published the following August.

==== Chronology of The New Yorker covers ====
Of the 33 issues of The New Yorker with cover art by Robert Tallon, one was published in 1974, three were published in 1975, three in 1976, six in 1977, two in 1978, one in 1979, four in 1980, three in 1981, and one in 1982. There were two per year from 1983 through 1986, none in 1987 (due to editorial changes at the magazine), and one in 1988.

1. 9 December 1974
2. 31 March 1975
3. 26 May 1975
4. 17 November 1975
5. 22 March 1976
6. 26 April 1976
7. 13 September 1976
8. 31 January 1977
9. 4 April 1977
10. 23 May 1977
11. 25 July 1977
12. 26 September 1977
13. 24 October 1977
14. 22 May 1978
15. 16 October 1978
16. 9 July 1979
17. 17 March 1980
18. 12 May 1980
19. 30 June 1980
20. 15 December 1980
21. 2 February 1981
22. 20 July 1981
23. 12 October 1981
24. 10 May 1982
25. 28 February 1983
26. 22 August 1983
27. 16 January 1984
28. 9 July 1984
29. 7 January 1985
30. 1 July 1985
31. 14 April 1986
32. 22 September 1986
33. 28 March 1988

== Art media and style ==
Tallon painted variously in tempera, watercolor, and acrylics, but he was also noted for combining watercolor and acrylic. He drew in ink, graphite pencil, colored pencil, pastel, and charcoal. A technique he used on a number of works was to rub the back of his drawing paper or canvas in order to give it a visible texture. The effect can be seen in The Boy with the Flute, which decorates the cover of the 9 December 1974 issue of The New Yorker.

Tallon's work had a distinctive character. Among the artists who inspired him were fellow New Yorker illustrator Julian de Miskey (1898–1976), painter/illustrator Constantin Alajalov (1900–1987), and painter Paul Klee (1879–1940). Although his illustration work is representational, later in life he turned to abstract painting. Tallon died in 2015.

== Bibliography ==
=== As writer and illustrator ===
Books written and illustrated by Robert Tallon
| Title | Form | Publication date | Location | Publisher | Refs |
|---|---|---|---|---|---|
| Conversations: Cries, Croaks, and Calls | Artist's book | 1963 | New York | Holt, Rinehart and Winston | |
| ABCDEFGHIJKLMNOPQRSTUVWXYZ in English and Spanish | Alphabet book | 1969 | New York | Lion Press | |
| The Thing in Dolores’ Piano | Picture book | 1970 | New York | Bobbs-Merrill | |
| Zoophabets | Alphabet book | 10 November 1971 | New York | Bobbs-Merrill | |
| Handella | Picture book | 23 August 1972 | New York | Holt, Rinehart and Winston | |
| Rhoda’s Restaurant | Picture book | 6 September 1973 | New York | Bobbs-Merrill | |
| Rotten Kidphabets | Alphabet book | 1975 | New York | Holt, Rinehart and Winston | |
| Zag: A Search Through the Alphabet | Alphabet book | 23 September 1976 | New York | Holt, Rinehart and Winston | |
| Fish Story | Picture book | 22 March 1977 | New York | Holt, Rinehart and Winston | |
| Flea Story | Picture book | 17 November 1977 | New York | Holt, Rinehart and Winston | |
| Worm Story | Picture book | 6 March 1978 | New York | Holt, Rinehart and Winston | |
| Little Cloud | Picture book | 1978 | New York | Parents' Magazine Press | |
| The Alligator’s Song | Picture book | 1981 | New York | Parents' Magazine Press | |
| Latouse My Moose | Picture book | 1983 | New York | Alfred A. Knopf | |
| Mooseberry and the Fuzzo Makers | Picture book | 1984 | New York | Alfred A. Knopf | |

==== Conversations: Cries, Croaks, and Calls (1963) ====
Conversations contains a series of vignettes from conversations in progress. Each conversation is distinct and narratively unrelated to the others. The text for each piece is a monologue delivered by one of the interlocutors. In some cases the speaker's statement is cohesive and confined to a single topic, while in others it is more reflective of the stream of consciousness.

The "conversations" are handwritten in cursive with ink on the verso, and illustrated with a full-page ink drawing on the recto. The cover, which is also hand-lettered in cursive, is decorated with a color drawing in oil pastel.

==== ABCDEFGHIJKLMNOPQRSTUVWXYZ in English and Spanish (1969) ====
This alphabet book has 25 single-page illustrations, one double-page illustration (for the letter A), and an illustrated title page. All illustrations are watercolor paintings. The letters are from the English alphabet. Each letter's painting illustrates a word that begins with the letter in both American English and Spanish. The English and Spanish words are printed on the opposite page in both minuscule and majuscule (e.g., BOAT boat / BARCO barco). The English and Spanish words translate to the same meaning. The illustration of the word for the letter W (wigwam, which is used in Spanish only as a loanword) has a note advising readers that "in Spanish, w is never used to begin a word."

A "Note to Parents and Teachers" (in English and Spanish) at the beginning of the book explains the editors' decision to include a word that begins with the English letter w but exclude words that begin with the Spanish letters ch, ll, and ñ. The book concludes with a pronunciation guide to each Spanish letter and word for English speakers, and a pronunciation guide to each English letter and word for Spanish speakers.

==== The Thing in Dolores' Piano (1970) ====
Just about everyone agrees that Dolores is a terrible pianist: her mother, her neighbors, the flowers and trees—even the notes who live inside her piano. When the musical notes themselves rebel and lock her piano keys, Dolores enters a secret door that takes her inside the piano. Her loyal dog Rover Rex comes too; since he is tone deaf, he is her only fan.

The book has a total of 28 illustrations, including the front cover and title page. Drawn in pencil and painted in tempera. The dedication reads, "For Maureen Anne, Jennifer and Bryan, who have a thing in their piano".

==== Zoophabets (1971) ====
Zoophabets is an A to Z bestiary of creatures like the blotz, who lives in basements and eats broken banjos, bent bugles, banged-up bazookas, and bedraggled bagpipes. And then there's the juga, who lives in jungle gyms and eats jump ropes, jigsaw puzzles, jugglers' pins, jokes, and jujubes.

Zoophabets contains illustrations of 26 named beasts, plus an anonymous one on the cover and one more on the title page. All 28 paintings are acrylic on masonite.

==== Handella (1972) ====
Handella's dancing career is off to a rough start: She is booed off the stage after she falls during a pirouette. She leaves in tears, and ends up on an adventure across a stormy sea and through a strange land. She arrives at the gate of legendary dancer Madame Fingersnap, who knows exactly how to fix Handella's technique.

In Handella's world, the people, animals, and trees are hands. Handella is drawn in ink and painted in tempera. In imitation of black-and-white film, Tallon limited the palette of the narrative illustrations to shades of gray. The cover is painted in color.

München Fabbri und Präger published a German translation in 1972: Handella. Eine Komödie für Hände in 3½ Akten.

==== Rhoda's Restaurant (1973) ====
You've heard of a genie that comes out of a lamp, and even a bottle, but how about a can? That's what Rhoda finds on a shelf in the stockroom of her new roadside restaurant. Rhoda needs some help, because she is an awful cook. One wish later, 100 customers fill her dining room. Wish number two gives her a bottomless pot of delicious spaghetti and meatballs; but within minutes, Rhoda has to use her third wish to stop the humongous spaghetti noodles and meatballs that flood the restaurant. After this ordeal, Rhoda sees fit to visit the factory that puts genies in cans. Her genie is not the only one (and each of them wears a can like a fez).

The book has a cover illustration painted in tempera, and narrative illustrations drawn in ink.

==== Rotten Kidphabets (1975) ====
Rotten Kidphabets features 26 tempera paintings of "rotten kids", from Awful Albert and Bad Beulah to Yowling Yankel and Zambiola Zachary, the Zig Zag Headed Zu Zu Nut. The front cover depicts Ucky Ulysses, and the back Weird Wilbur. The title page is a 27th tempera painting: a group portrait of 15 additional kids (and one dog).

==== Zag: A Search Through the Alphabet (1976) ====
Zig is a detective looking for Zag, and this is one case that will take him through the whole alphabet—one letter at a time. Zig gets thrown off a boat and has a confrontation with a belligerent jelly jar, but with each letter a tip or happy accident take him one step closer to his goal.

In emulation of the black and white, hardboiled detective films of the 1940s, the tempera paintings that illustrate the book are done in shades of gray.

==== Fish Story (1977) ====
Little Fish wants to live in a bigger pond. Big Cat promises to take him to the ocean, but they're really going to Big Cat's kitchen. Little Fish does not want to be pan-fried and eaten with ketchup. Fortunate for Little Fish, Big Cat is not the only one who can play a trick.

The cover, title page, and 13 narrative illustrations are drawn in ink and colored with tempera. Tallon dedicated Fish Story to his brothers Charles Jr. and Bill.

Fish Story was translated to Japanese by Keiko Yamamoto (山本 けい子), and published by Nupun Children's Book Publishing (ぬぷん児童図書出版) as Osakana no kachi (おさかなのかち) in 1984.

==== Flea Story (1977) ====
Mr. and Mrs. Flea move to a new home: the hair of an orange dog who lives with his human family in a suburban neighborhood. The fleas enjoy a pleasant enough domestic life in their new home until Mr. Flea overhears that the dog is going to have a bath. Another move seems inevitable—that is, until the fleas spot a burglar stealing away with a TV that belongs to the dog's family.

Flea Story is drawn in ink and painted in tempera. It was translated to Japanese by Keiko Yamamoto (山本 けい子), and published by Nupun Children's Book Publishing (ぬぷん児童図書出版) as Nomisan ootegara (のみさんおおてがら) in 1984.

==== Worm Story (1978) ====
"Oh! To be able to fly," Tiny Worm says one day. Fat Bird overhears this and sees an opportunity. He offers to teach Tiny Worm to fly. Tiny Worm has nothing to offer in exchange but friendship—something that Fat Bird does not value. Fat Bird has a counter-offer: Tiny Worm must gather together all his friends to make Fat Bird's flying class for worms worthwhile. All the other (older, wiser) worms know that this is a trick, but not Tiny Worm. So, when Tiny Worm finds himself trapped in Fat Bird's nest, his friends on the ground below are his only hope.

Worm Story has 13 narrative illustrations drawn in ink and painted in tempera, plus two more paintings for the title page and cover, respectively.

==== Little Cloud (1978) ====
The plants and animals in the valley under Mean Mountain need water. They never get rain because Mean Mountain scares all the clouds away. Little Cloud may not be big enough to give them rain by himself, but he has a plan.

Little Cloud has 11 single-page illustrations and two double-page illustrations. Additional paintings illustrate the cover and front matter. All illustrations are paintings in color. Tallon dedicated the book to his late father.

A Canadian French translation was published in Quebec under the title Petit nuage.

==== The Alligator’s Song (1981) ====
After the thunder wakes Eddie one night, he can hardly believe his eyes when he sees a sad alligator in a sailor's hat singing outside his window. If only the alligator could have his wish and make it back to the sea.

The book has 25 narrative illustrations drawn with pen and ink and painted in tempera; a 26th ink and tempera painting decorates the front cover. The dedication reads, "To all children: Hold on to your dreams."

==== Latouse My Moose (1983) ====
A man buys a moose from a stranger on the wharf, believing the sales pitch that what he's getting for his three dollars is a rare West Tibetan mountain dog. The man loves his new "dog", no matter how big he gets. But, when Latouse the moose wins big at the Big Dog Show, he attracts the attention of young Reggie Van Melville IV, who sends his bodyguards to moosenap Latouse.

Latouse My Moose has 33 single-page drawings in black pencil, plus an illustrated title page and endpapers. The cover is painted in tempera. The dedication reads "For my dear mother, a wonderful lady and talented artist".

==== Mooseberry and the Fuzzo Makers (1984) ====
Mooseberry is a boy who keeps his closet messy. So messy, in fact, that the Closet Keeper who lives in there calls it quits after only a week. No sooner is he gone than the Fuzzo Makers take over, using a machine to turn Mooseberry's clothes into fluffy bits of fuzz. Things go from bad to worse when they hold Mooseberry's dog Bork hostage to force Mooseberry to stuff this "fuzzo" into coat pockets all over town.

Mooseberry and the Fuzzo Makers has 12 double-page illustrations and 10 single-page illustrations. The cover and title page page are also illustrated. All illustrations except for the cover's are graphite drawings. Tallon dedicated the book to his sister Anne.

=== As illustrator ===
Books illustrated by Robert Tallon
| Title | Writer | Form | Publication date | Location | Publisher | Refs |
|---|---|---|---|---|---|---|
| Fables for the Fair: Cautionary Tales for Damsels Not Yet in Distress | Josephine Daskam Bacon | Collection of fables | 1967 | New York | Holt, Rinehart and Winston | |
| Hurry! Dinner Is at Six! | Ruth Leslie Smith | ? | 25 March 1969 | New York | Bobbs-Merrill | |
| Sam Sunday and the Strange Disappearance of Chester Cats | Robyn Supraner | Picture book | 1978 | New York | Parents' Magazine Press | |

==== Fables for the Fair: Cautionary Tales for Damsels Not Yet in Distress (1967) ====
This is a slim volume with 25 short fables written by Josephine Daskam Bacon (who is not credited in this 1967 edition). 13 of the 25 have one illustration each, drawn in ink. The cover has an ink drawing that parodies the cover of the 1902 edition. The title pages of the book and of the stories each have a small, decorative ink drawing.

This collection was not illustrated when it was first published under the title Fables for the Fair circa 1901.

==== Hurry! Dinner Is at Six! (1969) ====
Betsy's mother tells her to tidy away her things before dinner. It is not what Betsy would like to be doing. Red hen invites Betsy to accompany her to her cousin Cockaroo's birthday party. They meet lots of animals on their way, but Betsy has little time to stop.

==== Sam Sunday and the Strange Disappearance of Chester Cats (1978) ====
Normally Mrs. Cats has eight kittens, but one day there are only seven. Lolly, Polly, Dicky, Ricky, Terry, Merry, and Melvin are here, but where is Chester? When not even a fresh salmon pie lures him home, Mrs. Cats decides it's time to report his disappearance to the police. Their very best detective, Sam Sunday, is soon at her door. Like Joe Friday, Sam Sunday knows a clue when he hears one, and he does not like wasting time.

The story has nine single-page illustrations and six two-page illustrations. Four more paintings decorate the cover and front matter. All paintings are in color.

Sam Sunday was written by Robyn Supraner, an American poet, teacher, and author of numerous children's books. She published another Sam Sunday detective story, Sam Sunday and the Mystery at the Ocean Beach Hotel, in 1996. It is illustrated by Will Hillenbrand.

== See also ==
- List of children's literature writers
- List of illustrators
