= Mercury: The Afterlife and Times of a Rock God =

Play by Charles Messina

- Front cover of the first published edition of the play
- Original language: English
- Written by: Charles Messina
- Characters: Freddie Mercury
- Genre: Monodrama
- Setting: A room

Premiere
- Date: November 24, 1997
- Place: Sanford Meisner Theatre New York, NY

Mercury: The Afterlife and Times of a Rock God is a 1997 monodrama written by Charles Messina about the life and death of Queen lead singer Freddie Mercury. It presents Mercury in the moments just after his death, during which he is confronted with self-examination as he "seeks redemption before a God unimpressed by his celebrity."

== Synopsis ==
From an early age, Farrokh Bulsara of Persian descent felt discomfort about his physical characteristics, most notably his prominent upper teeth. It wasn't until later in adulthood that he discovered his passion for vocal performance and music, he then began to go by the chosen stage name "Freddie Mercury." After an over two decade career, on the night of November 24, 1991, Freddie must to face the frailty of his own humanity. As he succumbs to HIV that progressed to AIDS, the worldwide icon grapples with the idea of being at the will of a higher power, having been a self-identifying Zoroastrian his entire adulthood. In his ultimate struggle to make sense of fate after death, Mercury realizes that fame, fortune, and talents are no longer enough to sustain him; that beyond the darkness of his fears, shines a light far brighter than the star he was on Earth.

== Premiere ==
Mercury: The Afterlife and Times of a Rock God
- Promotional postcard for the second run of Mercury: The Afterlife and Times of a Rock God

The play debuted at the Sanford Meisner Theatre in New York City's Chelsea district on November 24, 1997, at 6:48pm - the 6th anniversary of Mercury's death. The part of Freddie was played by Khalid Gonçalves (né Paul Gonçalves).

On opening night of the play, then-New York City Council member Tom Duane introduced the show.

The play ran every night until December 7.

== Second run ==
The play began its second run on February 14, 1998.

On February 17, rock musician Billy Squier, a longtime friend of Freddie's, debuted a song that he wrote in memory of him titled I Have Watched You Fly on stage before a performance of the play. He introduced the song by saying, "I knew Freddie as a friend. I'm honored to share the stage with him in the afterlife."

The play was also performed every night during the second run, ending on March 8, 1998.

Proceeds from the ticket sales of both runs were donated to Gay Men's Health Crisis and The Mercury Phoenix Trust.

== Revival and tour ==
Mercury: The Afterlife and Times of a Rock God
- Promotional postcard for the third run of Mercury: The Afterlife and Times of a Rock God

On January 11, 2004, the play experienced a successful revival with a three-month run at the Triad Theater, also in New York City, with Messina again as writer/director and featuring Amir Darvish in the role of Freddie.

In 2006, the play also had a special, limited engagement from August 30 to September 2 at The Art House in Provincetown, Massachusetts.

== Publication ==
In 2009, the play was published by Original Works Publishing. Proceeds from the sale of the play will be donated to AmfAR, The Foundation for AIDS Research.

== Reception ==
Both incarnations of the play have received favorable reviews from Queen fans and from the music and theater press, notably Billboard, The New Yorker, Time Out New York, Zagat Survey, and Backstage. On November 26, 2011, the play was recognized by Flavorwire.com in their list of 15 Artistic Tributes to Freddie Mercury.

One frequent criticism of the play is the absence of music, particularly the discography from Queen and Mercury's solo career that audiences would associate Mercury with. In a 1997 interview with Playbill.com, Gonçalves said, "All the things I've seen about Mercury focus on the music, career and persona; very little has been discussed about the person. Not only did Charles write a play about Mercury, he captured the humanity." "Charles and I agreed that doing a musical about Mercury would take away from what we're trying to do in getting to the core of this person. The ultimate goal is to make a film of Mercury's life."

Likewise, Darvish, in a 2004 interview with Access Hollywood, stated that, "We wanted to stray away from the music. We wanted to tell his story. He has a story. Everyone knows the music. People are familiar with the music. It's his story, and where he's come from, and what he's done that people don't know.

== Milestone ==
Mercury: The Afterlife and Times of a Rock God marked the first time the life of Freddie Mercury had been presented in a theatrical form.

A film version of the play is currently in development.
