= Andrew Goffman =

American actor

Andrew Goffman is an American actor, stand-up comic, and author/performer of the Off-Broadway one man show The Accidental Pervert.

== Career ==
Goffman began his career as a stand-up comedian, playing New York City clubs including Carolines, Catch A Rising Star, The Comic Strip, Stand Up New York, the Boston Comedy Club, the Comedy Cellar, and Rascals. He later headlined internationally, including in Canada's renowned chain of comedy clubs, Yuk Yuks.

His intense theatrical training started with mentor JoAnna Beckson, known for her specialty in teaching comedians the art of acting. His classmates included Kevin James, Rock Reuben, Dave Chappelle, Mary Dimino, Dave Attell and Ray Romano.

Goffman made his Off-Broadway debut in the hit comedy Grandma Sylvia's Funeral, in which he played a lead role for more than a year.

He has appeared in films including The First Wives Club with Beth Midler, iMurders with William Forsythe, and The Stand-In with Kelly Ripa.

=== The Accidental Pervert ===
In 2005, Goffman wrote his one-man show, The Accidental Pervert, which had its world premiere in Times Square, New York City. It was directed by Charles Messina, and ran at the 13th Street Rep in New York City.

The Accidental Pervert has run in over 15 countries on four different continents, and has a multitude of licensing deals by international producers, theaters, and television/film celebrities playing the role of the Pervert worldwide. It was performed in Greenwich Village, New York City over 1,500 times.

== Filmography ==
- The First Wives Club (1996)
- The Stand-In (1999)
- Nights with Mary (2007)
- iMurders (2008)
