= Ernest Mingione =

American actor known for playing police officers

- Born: United States
- Occupation: Actor
- Years active: 1995–present

Ernest Mingione is an American actor mainly known for portraying police officers. He made many appearances in Third Watch between 1999 and 2000. He has appeared in shows such as Law & Order, Law & Order: Special Victims Unit and Law & Order: Criminal Intent. Beginning in March 2010, he began a recurring role as Rocco Ciccone on the CBS soap As the World Turns.

In 2007, Mingione starred with Gina Ferranti and Jason Cerbone in Charles Messina's play Merging, which won BEST PLAY in The Players' Theater's Shortened Attention Span Theater Festival in Greenwich Village. Mingione also starred in the film version of Merging, which was released in 2009.
