= Lynne Koplitz =

American stand-up comedian and actress (born 1969)

- Born: June 13, 1969 (age 57); Long Island, New York, U.S.
- Education: Troy State University

Comedy career
- Years active: 1989 – Present
- Medium: stand-up, television
- Genre: Observational comedy
- Subjects: American culture and human behavior

Lynne Koplitz is an American stand-up comedian and actress. Koplitz was host of Telepictures' nationally syndicated dating show Change of Heart, guest host on NBC's Later, co-host of the Food Network's How to Boil Water, and co-host of Sony Pictures syndicated talk show Life and Style. Her stand-up has appeared on a number of Comedy Central specials, including Premium Blend and Comedy Central Presents. She performed at the Just for Laughs comedy festival in Montreal.

== Life and career ==
Koplitz was born on Long Island, New York, and grew up in Sarasota, Florida. Koplitz earned a BA in theatre arts from Troy State University where she was a member of the Iota Kappa chapter of Chi Omega in 1989. She performed for a regional theater group in Knoxville, Tennessee, before moving to New York City.

Koplitz is one of the comedian contributors to the History of the Joke on the History Channel, hosted by Lewis Black. Koplitz was featured in a series of advertisements for her alma mater, Troy University. She co-starred on Sony’s syndicated talk show, Life & Style with Jules Asner and Kimora Lee Simmons, as well as the NBC shows, Extra, The Other Half, and Shop & Style. Lynne also had a half-hour special, Comedy Central Presents: Lynne Koplitz on Comedy Central. She was featured in a commercial for Midol. Koplitz also played Dina, the manager of the band ZO2, on IFC's Z Rock. In 2009, she co-hosted the inaugural broadcast of the StarTalk podcast, along with well-known astrophysicist Dr. Neil deGrasse Tyson.

On September 20, 2010, Koplitz played Sister Rita in a staged reading of the Charles Messina play A Room of My Own at The Theatre at 45 Bleecker Street in Greenwich Village.

Koplitz appeared on the We TV series, Joan & Melissa: Joan Knows Best.

In 2017, she released her first Netflix special, titled Hormonal Beast, to positive reviews. She dedicated her special to Joan Rivers.
