= List of Panamanian films =

A list of films produced in Panama in year order.

== 1930s ==
Title	Director	Cast	Genre	Notes
1929
Los abismos de la vida				
1930
Alma peruana				
1931
1932
1933
1934
1935
1936
1937
1938
1939

== 1940s ==
Title	Director	Cast	Genre	Notes
1940
1941
1942
1943
1944
1945
A río revuelto				
1946
Al calor de mi bohío	Carlos Luis Nieto			
1947
1948
Una Apuesta con Satanás				
1949

== 1950s ==
Title	Director	Cast	Genre	Notes
1950
1951
1952
1953
1954
1955
1956
1957
1958
1959

== 1960s ==
Title	Director	Cast	Genre	Notes
1960
1961
1962
1963
1964
1965
1966
Ileana, la mujer				
1967
A la sombra del sol				
1968
Annabelle Lee				
1969

== 1970s ==
Title	Director	Cast	Genre	Notes
1970
Anthropology: A Study of People				
1971
La Araucana				
Rainforest Family	Wayne Mitchell			
Food from the Rainforest	Wayne Mitchell			
An mar tule	Armando Robles Godoy			
1972
1973
1974
Allpakallpa				
Arrows				
1975
1976
Compadre vamos pa'lante				
1977
1978
Préstamela esta noche	Tulio Demicheli	Manolo Escobar, Perla Faith, Antonio Garisa		
1979

== 1980s ==
Title	Director	Cast	Genre	Notes
1980
Abisa a los compañeros				
Aventuras prohibidas				
Fangio: Una vita a 300 all'ora	Hugh Hudson			
1981
1982
¡Aquí hay coraje!				
1983
The Cuna Indians: Island Exiles				
1984
Sirenata en B	Sandra Eleta, Edgar Soberón Torchia			
1985
La aparición				
1986
Miss Universe Pageant	Tony Charmoli			
El Caricaturista				
1987
Eli Jiménez				
Entrese a Ganar				
1988
1989
Video Shock				

== 1990s ==
Title	Director	Cast	Genre	Notes
1990
El imperio nos visita nuevamente	Sandra Eleta			
1991
Alias 'La Gringa'				
1992
El Aniversario				
Apu Condor (The Condor God)				
Kariot	José Macías			
Extremos				
1993
Snoot Amanap				
Pequeños novios				
1994
India dormida				
1995
Anda, corre, vuela				
Códigos de silencio				
Sangre				
Canaleo				
1996
Grampa	Joseph Medina			
Eres mi Canción				
Isabel de Obaldía				
Krung kita, la balsería en Kribarigâde				
1997
Rompe La Rutina			News	
1998
El mandado	Pituka Ortega-Heilbron			
El corazón de las mujeres de piedra				
Mira por mi ventana				
1999
A la medianoche y media	Mariana Rondón, Marite Ugáz			
Sacrifictum	Pituka Ortega-Heilbron			
Solteras				
Calle 13				

== 2000s ==
Title	Director	Cast	Genre	Notes
2000
It's the Way You See It	Arianne Benedetti			
2001
The Tailor of Panama				
La noche	Joaquín Carrasquilla, Jaime Chung			
Diablo rojo				
Reunión de tres hijos de Ochún				
Yo me atrevo, tú te atreves, ellas se atreven...				
2002
Anuncie aquí				
Away				
La otra cara	Guillaume Dufour			
Miss México regresa	Rocco Melillo			
De carenero a Nueva Orleans	Gerardo Maloney			
Inventario de una experiencia				
One Dollar, The Price of Life	Hector Herrera, Joan Cutrina		Documentary	
2003
Así de fácil				
El abuelo de mi abuela				
Archivo Courret. Un estorbo de cien mil dólares				
Are You Feeling Lonely?				
Ciudad desnuda			Thriller	
Vigilia	Angel Hepburn			
Coexistencia				
2004
Aura				
Tras las huellas de Mano de Piedra Duran				
Boxers and Ballerinas	Mike Cahill, Brit Marling			
Bazuka	Anel Reyes			
El amigo Juancho				
El abuelo de mi abuela: Cañaza Cimarron				
2005
Al son de mi familia				
Víctimas de la violencia, testigos de la solidaridad				
Apu Oncoy: Una voz, un sueño en los Andes				
Arena viva				
3 Pies Izquierdos	Arianne Benedetti			
El Otro Lado: Panama Gay				
El Otro Lado: La Joya				
Los puños de una nación				
Liza... como ella				
2006
El Acuarelista				
Mizery	Carmen Oquendo-Villar, Joaquin Terrones			
Paz mundial... créetelo				
2007
Wait for Me	Daniel Gillies, Geoffrey Oki			
Hayah Panama				
Menores de edad	Henryk Abrego			
2008
Quantum of Solace				
La Isla del Diablo	Alberto Serra			
Infraganti				
Curundu				
2009
Chance	Abner Benaim			
The Passage	Alexander Douglas			
Toca y Muere				
Sabor tropical	Jorge Ameer			
Fuera de casa				

== 2010s ==
Title	Director	Cast	Genre	Notes
2010
Negocios	Miguel Ángel Cárcano			
Maids and Bosses	Abner Benaim			
El último soldado				
Wata				
View of the World				
The Colors of the Mountain	Carlos César Arbeláez			
2011
Caspa	Carolina Borrero			
Desplazada				
Adorado tormento				
Dia 1 el documental				
Donde caen nuestros heroes				
2012
Ruta de la luna	Juan Sebastian Jacome			
Caos en la ciudad	Enrique Pérez Him			
Getaway				
The Door				
Las Tentaciones de Ana				
2013
Deep Sea Monsters				
Conexion				
Giraffes	Kiki Álvarez			
Reinas	Ana Endara Mislov			
Alma De Guerrero	Paco Castillo			
Javier Medina Bernal - Vale la pena soñar, versión Tocando Madera				
Descubridores por la Ruta de Balboa				
Loor al Maestro				
Praise the Teacher				
Greed				
Out: La salida está en tu mente				
2014
Historias del Canal				
Lo Que Imagino de Ella				
Breaking the Wave	Annie Canavaggio			
Prohibido Olvidar	Oscar Faarup			
9 de Enero: El día que dijimos presente				
Desenterrando a mi suegra				
La Esquina Del Rock				
Panama Canal Stories	Abner Benaim, Carolina Borrero, Luis Franco Brantley, Pinky Mon, Pituka Ortega-Heilbron			
The Third Wave	Christian Wolf			
Invasión	Abner Benaim		Documentary	
Adventures on Time Island with VIPO & Friends	Ido Angel			
Chilibre	Rodrigo Quintero Arauz			
Nuestro Hogar	Detsy Barrigon, Iván Jaripio			
Cada Día				
Beyond the Sea				
Bernardo				
CONDENADOS Un Caribe Rojo				
2015
Box 25	Mercedes Arias, Delfina Vidal		Documentary	
Las Aventuras de un Bien Cuidao				
La Pasiva	Diego De Obaldía			
Weed	Enrique Pérez Him			
Una Maid En Paitilla			Comedy	
Mi Comandante	Maria Isabel Burnes			
Operación Piscis	Christian Wolf			
Brilla por ti				
Touch & Die				
El Naza: The Black Christ of Portobelo				
2016
Salsipuedes	Ricardo Aguilar Navarro, Manuel Rodríguez		Drama	
El Cheque: La Película	Arturo Montenegro			
Skate Amor y Odio	Jhojaddy Ramirez			
La felicidad del sonido	Ana Endara Mislov			
Cuando Sobran las Palabras				
Re-Fresh	Haslam Ortega			
La ruta				
Se Alquila el 42B			Comedy	
Aves de Papel				
Hands of Stone	Jonathan Jakubowicz			
A la deriva	Miguel I. González			
Hidden	Guillermo Barcenas, Frank Spano			
EL Picaflor				
Zachrisson	Abner Benaim			
Lo Desconocido			Mystery	
Padre	Ariel Arauz			
The Pastor's Daughter	Jesus Adames			
The Bucket				
Drifting Away				
Victor el del Chat				
El Amateur				
Versus				
San Blas Adventures				
Paralelo - Zombie				
Grietas				
Time to Love. A backstage Tale.				
Diablico				
Los Cuatro Reyes				
Prueba de Fe				
2017
Beyond Brotherhood	Arianne Benedetti	Drew Fuller	Drama	
Donaire y Esplendor	Arturo Montenegro			
Kimura	Aldo Rey Valderrama			
Ilegitimo	Juan Camilo Gamba			
Piedra Roja	Alberto Serra			
Lapso				
La Fuerza del Balon				
Rio Abajo: Los Años Dorados				
Rojas	Amael Farouk			
Oasis	Jorge Ameer			
Cuando Vuelvan los Bosques	Alejandro Balaguer, Carlos Garcia de Paredes			
Calypsonians	Anghelo Taylor, Damien Prouvost			
What	Haslam Ortega			
El perro de Tindalos	Amael Farouk			
Disciplina				
Los días normales				
PVC 3.0				
Harbinger				
De Hermano a Hermano				
Entre Secretos				
The Big Bad Wolf and the Little Blue Frog				
Rescatando el sabor del Caribe				
La Sombra en la Oscuridad				
La cucarachita Mandi				
La Matamoros				
2018
Ruben Blades Is Not My Name	Abner Benaim		Documentary	
Sin Pepitas en la Lengua	Juan Carlos Garcia de Paredes, Carlos Garcia de Paredes		Comedy	
La estación seca	José Ángel Canto			
Inesperado	Victor Kam			
Diciembres	Enrique Castro Ríos			
Náufragos				
Insania	Piña Luna Renata			
Panamá Al Brown: Cuando el puño se abre				
Frozen in Russia	Arturo Montenegro			
Paladins vs Overwatch	Gamir Ruíz			
Inland	Mauro Colombo			
The P.I.M.P.	Miguel García de la Calera			
El Anti-Friendzone			Comedy	
Los Tiempos del Agua	Kane Lee Kwik			
Son of Liberty	Arturo Dupont			
Break Even	Cedric Carrere, Andres Mendez			
El legado				
Don't Give Up				
Paname				
Una Noche de Calypso				
Plan de ahorro				
Caso #303				Short film
Tiburones enfrascados				
Fuera de Control				
En busca del indio conejo				
Exit				
2019
Everybody Changes	Arturo Montenegro		Drama	
Diablo Rojo PTY	Sol Charlotte, J. Oskura Nájera			
Operation Just Cause	Luis Franco Brantley, Luis Pacheco			
Locos Al Poder	Juan Zelaya			
Panamá Radio	Edgar Soberón Torchia			
Atrápalo, Vivo o Muerto				
Huaquero: Profano de las Sombras	Adrian Mora			
Panama in a Day	Ricardo Aguilar Navarro, Manuel Rodríguez			
God Is in the Breath				
Atrápalo vivo Muerto	Tony Irigoyen			
Desde La Ventana de Jorge				
Obstáculos Orgullo Y Recompensa	John Lopez			
Panama Canal in 3D a Land Divided a World United	Keith Melton			
Escribiendo El General	Oscar Faarup			
Bruja	Andres Peyrot			
Sundae	Haslam Ortega			
Nadie Nos Quita				
Days of Light				

== 2020s ==
Title	Director	Cast	Genre	Notes
2020
Salta	José Macías			
Adiós Bárbara	Mariel Garcia Spooner			
Vocación				
Panquiaco	Ana Elena Tejera			
La Ilusion				
2021
Plaza Catedral	Abner Benaim		Drama	
For Your Peace of Mind, Make Your Own Museum	Ana Endara Mislov, Pilar Moreno			
Algo Azul	Mariel Garcia Spooner			
Parking Histórico 1: La Separación de Panamá de Colombia				
Shadows	Haslam Ortega			
Cruel Winter: Survive the Storm	LuisManChelo			
Monarca	Marcial Delouis			
Wigudun	Fernando Muñoz, Raphael Salazar			
A Love Song in Spanish	Ana Elena Tejera			
Acepto	Fernando Broce			
La sonrisa de Gerta	Raquel Toledo Bernal			
Pipe Dreams	Nicole Lasso			
Natacoyo	Ramon Antonio Mendoza Dangond			
Tito, Margot y yo				
Estanislao				
2022
Birthday Boy	Arturo Montenegro			
El Sacrificio	Alberto Serra			
La Batalla por la Dominacion del planeta	Jorge Hamilton			
Parking Histórico 2: La Decepción del Canal Francés				
Gauguin and Canal	Frank Spano			
Recuerda	Alberto Serra, Leo Wiznitzer			
Sancocho Presidencial	Juan Zelaya			
Júpiter en Piscis	Eliana Araúz			
Una chispa en mi				
Hijas de la Invasión	Eliana Araúz			
Panama Al Brown	Ricardo Aguilar Navarro, Manuel Rodríguez			
Tito, Margot & Me	Mercedes Arias & Delfina Vidal		Documentary	
Tumbadores	Maria Isabel Burnes			
Víboras de Oropel	Sergio Rojas			
2023
El cerebro en el frasco				
Paralelo 7/9	Ana Patricia Angulo Nicosia, Paco Castillo			
El juego de BMX	Juan Hodgson			
Sister & Sister	Kattia González	Ariana Chaves Gavilán, Cala Rossel Campos, Fernando Bonilla, Joshua De León, Milagros Fernández, Lía Jiménez, Gabriela Man, Angello Morales, Michelle Quiñones, Lurys Rivera, Mir Rodriguez, Seuxis Sánchez	Drama	
God Is a Woman	Andres Peyrot		Documentary	
2024
Beloved Tropic	Ana Endara	Paulina García	Drama	
Chacaleria	Gurnir Singh	Mayra Hurley, Miguel Ángel Oyola, Juliette Roy, Elmis Castillo, Andres Poveda, Samuel Ibarra	Crime Thriller	
Once Upon a Time in Panama	Elmis Castillo	Elmis Castillo, Luis Gotti, Hermes Mendoza, Marcell Chávez, Robert De Luca, Diego De Obaldía, Mariano Abdel Gonzalez, Marelissa Him, Edward José, Domil Leira, Alex Mariscal, Gabriel Pérez Matteo, Ivan Peña, RoChia, Diego Ruzzarin, Abdiel Tapia, Carlos Tibbet, Marcelo Villareal, Aaron Zebede	Comedy	Premiered on March 21
Wake Up Mom	Arianne Benedetti	Arianne Benedetti, Erick Elías, Mila Romedetti, Ana Alejandra Carrizo, Abraham Pino, Chris Oberto, Ingrid De Ycaza, Andrés Morales, Caio Mena, Marco Oses, Christopher Oberto	Action, Thriller, Drama	
2025
Papers	Arturo Montenegro	Megan Montaner, Carlos Bardem, Antonio Dechent, Gustavo Bassani, Jaime Newbal, Nick Romano, Agustín Della Corte, Verónica Ortiz, Henry Twohy, Leo Wiznitzer, Gaby Gnazzo, Stella Lauri, Andrea Pérez Meana, Alí Arrocha, Ana Sibauste, Ana Alejandra Carrizo, Carlos Alfredo Lopez, Andrés Clemente, Roberto Thomas-Díaz, Paulette Thomas, Luis Franco Brantley, Enitzabel Castrellon	Thriller, Drama	Premiered on April 10
