= Cinema of Latin America =

Latin American cinema refers collectively to the film output and film industries of Latin America. Latin American film is both rich and diverse, but the main centers of production have been Argentina, Brazil and Mexico. Latin American cinema flourished after the introduction of sound, which added a linguistic barrier to the export of Hollywood films south of the border.

== History ==
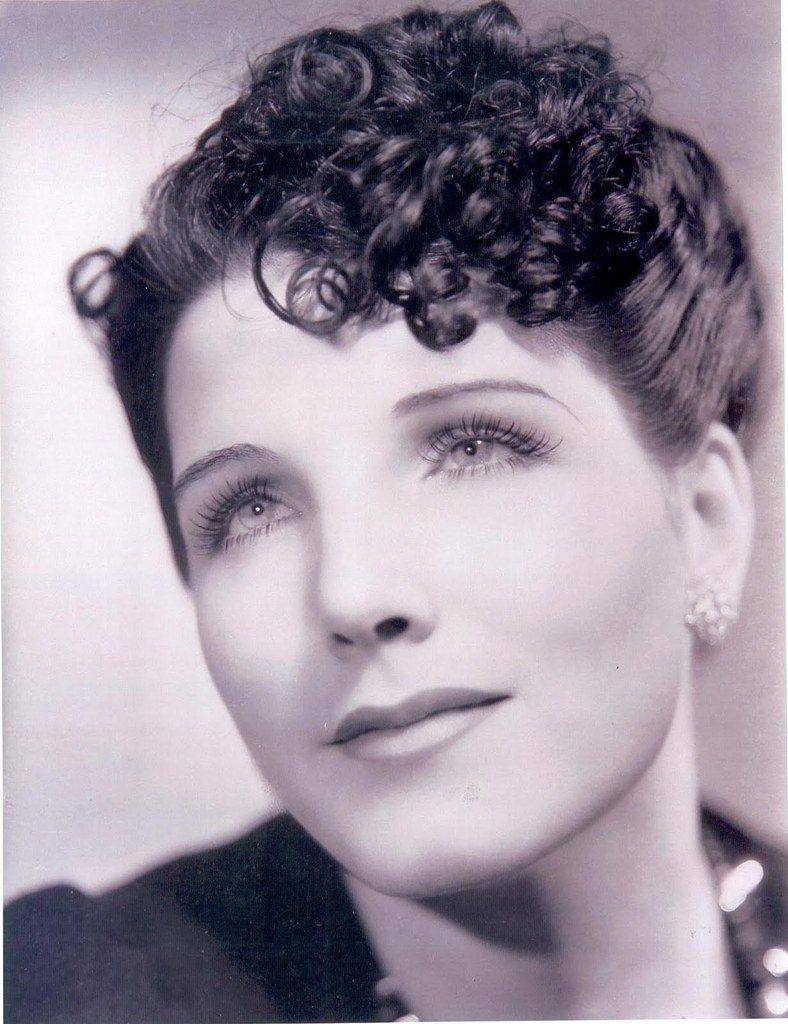
Portrait of Libertad Lamarque, one of the most popular actresses of both the Golden Age of Argentine cinema and the Golden Age of Mexican cinema.

The origins of early filmmaking is generally associated with Salvador Toscano Barragán. In 1898, Toscano made Mexico's second film with a plot, titled Don Juan Tenorio. During the Mexican Revolution, Toscano recorded several clips of the battles, which would become a full-length documentary in 1950, assembled by his daughter. Other short films were either created or influenced from French film-makers. Mexican movies from the Golden Era in the 1940s and 1950s are significant examples of Latin American cinema. Mexican movies were exported and exhibited in all Latin America and Europe. The film Maria Candelaria (1944) by Emilio Fernández won the Grand Prix in Cannes Film Festival in 1946. Famous actors and actresses from this period include María Félix, Pedro Infante, Dolores del Río, Jorge Negrete, and comedian Cantinflas.

During the silent era, Argentina emerged as one of the most significant producers of fiction films in Latin America, known for both the number of films made and the recognition they received. Favored by the outbreak of World War I in Europe, the country experienced a "golden age" of silent films and led their production in Spanish, with more than 100 feature films being made between 1915 and 1924, equal to the combined total of those made in Mexico and Spain. During the first three decades of the 20th century, more than 200 silent feature films were produced in the country, in addition to a large number of documentaries, newsreels and shorter fictional works. However, the Argentine cinema of the silent period—as in other countries in the region—did not manage to consolidate as an industry, hampered by financing problems and by the popularity of the more advanced Hollywood cinema, which flooded the national market from 1917 onwards. Despite these limitations, the silent era saw the professional formation of several filmmakers who laid many of the foundations for the industrial sound films of the 1930s, and some of them, such as José A. Ferreyra and Leopoldo Torres Ríos, were fundamental for that period as well.

In Argentina, the emergence of sound films in 1933 led to the Golden Age of Argentine cinema or the "classical-industrial period" (1930s–1950s), during which national film production underwent a process of industrialization and standardization that involved the emergence of mass production, the establishment of the studio, genre and star systems, quickly becoming one of the most popular film industries across Latin America and the Spanish-speaking world. The number of films shot in the country grew 25-fold between 1932 and 1939, more than any other Spanish-speaking country. By 1939, Argentina established itself as the world's leading producer of films in Spanish, a position that it maintained until 1942, the year in which film production reached its peak. Beginning in 1943, as a response to Argentina's neutrality in the context of World War II, the United States imposed a boycott on sales of film stock to the country, causing Mexican cinema to displace Argentina as the market leader in Spanish.

The 1950s and 1960s saw a movement towards Third Cinema, led by the Argentine filmmakers Fernando Solanas and Octavio Getino.

In Brazil, the Cinema Novo movement created a particular way of making movies with critical and intellectual screenplays, a clearer photography related to the light of the outdoors in a tropical landscape, and a political message. The film The Given Word / Keeper of Promises (1962) by Anselmo Duarte, won the Palme d'Or at the 1962 Cannes Film Festival, becoming the first (and to date the only) Brazilian film to achieve that feat. A year later, it also became the first Brazilian and South American film nominated for the Academy Award for Best Foreign Language Film. Director Glauber Rocha was the key figure of the Brazilian Cinema Novo movement, famous for his trilogy of political films: Deus e o Diabo na Terra do Sol, Terra em Transe (1967) and O Dragão da Maldade Contra o Santo Guerreiro (1969), for which he won the Best Director award at the Cannes Film Festival.

In Colombia, Carlos Mayolo, Luis Ospina and Andrés Caicedo led an alternative movement that was to have lasting influence, founding the Grupo de Cali, which they called Caliwood and producing some films as leading exponents of the "New Latin American Cinema" of the 1960s and 1970s, including Oiga, Vea, The Vampires of Poverty (Ospina) and Carne de tu carne (Mayolo) were produced in the 1980s and belong to a different aesthetics.

Cuban cinema has enjoyed much official support since the Cuban revolution, and important film-makers include Tomás Gutiérrez Alea.

In Argentina, after a series of military governments that shackled culture in general, the industry re-emerged after the 1976–1983 military dictatorship to produce The Official Story in 1985, becoming the first of only three Latin American movies to win the Academy Award for Best Foreign Language Film. Other nominees for Argentina were The Truce (1974), Camila (1984), Man Facing Southeast (1986), Tango (1998), Son of the Bride (2001), The Secret In Their Eyes (2009, which also won the award), Wild Tales (2014). and Argentina, 1985 (2022)

More recently, a new style of directing and stories filmed has been tagged as "New Latin American Cinema," although this label was also used in the 1960s and 1970s.

In Mexico movies such as Como agua para chocolate (1992), Cronos (1993), Amores perros (2000), Y tu mamá también (2001), Pan's Labyrinth (2006) and Babel (2006) have been successful in creating universal stories about contemporary subjects, and were internationally recognised, as in the prestigious Cannes Film Festival. Mexican directors Alejandro González Iñárritu, Alfonso Cuarón (Harry Potter and the Prisoner of Azkaban), Guillermo del Toro and screenwriter Guillermo Arriaga have gone on to Hollywood success, with Cuaron and González Iñárritu becoming the only Latin Americans to win both the Academy Award and the Directors Guild of America award for Best Director.

The Argentine economic crisis affected the production of films in the late 1990s and early 2000s, but many Argentine movies produced during those years were internationally acclaimed, including El abrazo partido (2004), Roma (2004) and Nueve reinas (2000), which was the basis for the 2004 American remake Criminal.

The modern Brazilian film industry has become more profitable inside the country, and some of its productions have received prizes and recognition in Europe and the United States. The comedy film O Auto da Compadecida (2000) is considered a classic of Brazilian cinema and was a box-office hit in the country. Movies like Central Station (1998), City of God (2002) and Elite Squad (2007) have fans around the world, and its directors Walter Salles, Fernando Meirelles and José Padilha, have taken part in American and European film projects. Central Station was nominated for 2 Academy Awards in 1999: Best Foreign Language Film and Best Actress for Fernanda Montenegro, who became the first Brazilian, the first Portuguese-speaking and the first Latin-American to be nominated for Best Actress; in 2025 her daughter, Fernanda Torres became the second one, for I'm Still Here. In 2003, City of God was nominated for 4 Academy Awards: Best Director, Best Adapted Screenplay, Best Cinematography and Best Film Editing, it was also nominated for a Golden Globe Award for Best Foreign Language Film. Elite Squad won the Golden Bear at the 2008 Berlin Film Festival. In 2025, I'm Still Here was the first Brazilian to win an Academy Award, for Best Internacional Feature, having also being nominated for Best Film and Fernanda Torres as Best Actress.

There is a movement in the US geared towards promoting and exposing audiences to Latin American filmmakers. The New England Festival of Ibero American Cinema - which takes place in Providence, Rhode Island, is a good example.

According to PWC's Global Media Outlook 2019-2023 report, production levels for major film industries in Latin America is seeing an upward trend ever since 2014. By the end of 2018 there were 13,464 screens in Latin America. In case of Argentina there were 223 films released in 2018. In Peru, despite being one of the smallest Latin American markets has increased their screens to 661 in 2018 and would amount to 789 by 2023. Mexico continues to have the highest amount of screens with a total of 6,862 while Brazil next with 3,465 screens. In terms of revenues, the study projects steady growth in the region towards 2023. The box office is expected to rise from $2.4 billion raised in 2018 to $3.2 billion by 2023. This would represent a compound annual growth rate of 5.7 per cent for that period.

In Latin America in general, there has been renewed interest in animation ever since the late 2010s Ventana Sur's Animation! and Mexico's Pixelatl festivals have inaugurated the creative potential of animators to an international level. Two of Latin America's biggest animation companies are Mexico’ Ánima Estudios and Brazil's TV Pinguim. Together with the other animation houses in Latin America, they are bringing forth stories depicting the exotic locations of South America, the indigenous myths and legends, and universal themes that has the potential to have worldwide appeal. In 2017 alone more than 100 feature-length animated films were currently worked on in Central and South America. Financial backing is the only factor that holds back the Latin American animation industry such as those in Peru.

== See also ==
- Cinema of Argentina
- Cinema of Bolivia
- Cinema of Brazil
- Cinema of Chile
- Cinema of Colombia
- Cinema of Costa Rica
- Cinema of Cuba
- Cinema of the Dominican Republic
- Cinema of Ecuador
- Cinema of El Salvador
- Cinema of Guatemala
- Cinema of Honduras
- Cinema of Mexico
- Cinema of Nicaragua
- Cinema of Panama
- Cinema of Paraguay
- Cinema of Peru
- Cinema of Puerto Rico
- Cinema of Uruguay
- Cinema of Venezuela
- List of Latin American films
- List of Dominican films
- List of Guatemalan films
- List of Honduran films
- List of Nicaraguan films
- List of Panamanian films
- Latin American art
- Latin American literature
- Latin American culture
- World cinema
