= List of Honduran films =

This is a list of films produced in the Honduran film industry from 1962 to the present.

== 20th century ==
=== 1960s ===
Release	Name of film	Genre	Director	Length	Budget	Box office
1962	Mi Amigo Ángel	Drama	Sami Kafati	32 minutes		

=== 1970s ===
Release	Name of film	Genre	Director	Length	Budget	Box office
1971	Independencia de Honduras	Documentary	Sami Kafati			
1976	Agua, vida y desarrollo	Documentary	Sami Kafati			
1976	Proyecto Guanchías	Documentary	Sami Kafati			
1976	Bajo Aguán	Documentary	Sami Kafati			
1976	Utopia	Drama	Raúl Ruiz	64 minutes		
1977	Bosques y maderas de Honduras	Documentary	Sami Kafati			
1977	Acueductos rurales	Documentary	Sami Kafati			
1977	El despertar del Kukulcán	Documentary	Sami Kafati			
1977	Escuela de ciencias forestales	Documentary	Sami Kafati			
1977	Salud en Honduras	Documentary	Sami Kafati			

=== 1980s ===
Release	Name of film	Genre	Director	Length	Budget	Box office
1980	El Tata Lempria	Documentary	Rene Pauck			
1981	El vuelo	Drama	Unknown			
1984	No hay tierra sin dueño	Historical drama	Sami Kafati	107 minutes		
1989	La Hora muerta	TV film	Javier Suazo mejia	80 minutes		

=== 1990s ===
Release	Name of film	Genre	Director	Length	Budget	Box office
1990	Doña Ticha	Drama	Rene Pauck			
1991	Morazan cristo	Documentary	Unknown			
1995	Alto riesgo	Drama	Rene Pauck			
1999	El espíritu de mi mamá	Drama	Ali Allie	78 minutes		

== 21st century ==
=== 2000s ===
Release	Name of film	Genre	Director	Length	Budget	Box office
2001	Anita la cazadora de Insectos	Drama	Hispano Durón	80 minutes		
2002	Almas de la Medianoche	Horror	Juan Carlos Fanconi	120 minutes	$230.000	
2005	Corazón abierto	Documental	Julia Herrera, Katia Lara	40 minutes	$10.000	
2007	Oscuro cardinal	Animation	Adrián Guerra	7 minutes		
2009	Amor y Frijoles	Drama Romance	Mathew Kodath y Hernan Pereira	90 minutes		

=== 2010 ===
Release	Name of film	Genre	Director	Length	Budget	Box office
2010	Quien dijo miedo, Honduras de un Golpe	Documentary	Katia Lara	93 minutes		
2010	Unos Pocos con Valor		Douglas Martin			
2011	El Profe	Drama	Ángel Maldonado	8 minutes		
2012	El Xendra	Horror, science fiction	Juan Carlos Fanconi	109 minutes	$450,000.00	$620,000.00
2013	¿Quién paga la cuenta?	Comedy and drama	Mathew Kodath and Benjie López	110 minutes		
2013	"21"	Drama	Tomas Chi	12 minutes		
2014	Cuentos y leyendas de Honduras	Horror	Javier Suazo Mejía y Rony Alvarenga	90 minutes		
2014	11 cipotes	Comedy, sports	Tomas Chi			
2015	Chincheman	Parody, Superhero	Igor Padilla			
2016	El Paletero	Superhero, comedy	Michael Bandeck	105 minutes		
2016	Berta Vive	Documentary Tercer Piso	Katia Lara	30 minutes		
2016	Fuerzas de Honor	War, action	Tomas chi	93 minutes		
2016	El señor de la sierra	Historical drama	Alejandro Irías			
2017	A Place in the Caribbean	Romantic drama	Juan Carlos Fanconi	114 minutes		
2017	Morazán	Historical drama	Hispano Duron	90 minutes		
2018	Cipotes	Drama	Hector Chirinos	106 minutes		
2018	Olancho	Documentary Tercer Piso	Ted Griswold	70 minutes		
2019	Café con sabor a mi tierra	Drama	Carlos Membreño	110 minutes		
2019	Days of Light					

=== 2020s ===
Release	Name of film	Genre	Director	Length	Budget	Box office
2020	Its me, Sarah	Drama, psychological thriller	Fabiola Andrade	20 minutes		
2021	"90 minutos"	Drama	Aedeen O'Connor	130 minutes		
2021	Before Dawn / Antes de que Amanezca	Drama, Thriller Tercer Piso	Enrique Medrano	130 minutes		
2022	La Condesa	Horror, thriller	Mario Ramos	120 minutes		
2023	Riccy	Drama, psychological thriller	Mildred Tejada	20 minutes		

== See also ==
- Theater in Honduras
- Culture of Honduras
- Honduran literature
- Honduran folklore
- Theater in Honduras
- Education in Honduras
