= List of Nicaraguan films =

This is a list of films produced in Nicaragua.

== A ==
- Alsino and the Condor (Alsino y el cóndor) (1982)

== C ==
- El Center fielder (1985)
- El Chogui (2001)
- Cinema Alcázar (1997)
- Con ánimo de lucro (2006)

== D ==
- Daughter of Rage (2004)
- Days of Light (2019)
- De niña a madre (2004)

== E ==
- Estos sí pasarán (1985)
- Exiliada (2019)

== G ==
- The Ghost of War (El Espectro de la guerra, 1988)

== H ==
- Historia de Rosa (2005)

== I ==
- El Inmortal (2005)

== L ==
- Lady Marshall (1990)
- La Llamada de la muerte (1960)

== M ==
- Memorias del viento (1992)
- Metal y vidrio (2002)
- Mojados (2013)
- Mujeres en armas (1981)

== N ==
- No todos los sueños han sido soñados (1995)
- Nunca nos rendiremos (1984)

== O ==
- Okhota na drakona (1986)

== S ==
- Sandino (1990)
- Se le movió el piso: A portrait of Managua (1996)
- El Señor presidente (1983)

== V ==
- Voces de cenzontle (1999)

== Y ==
- La Yuma (2009)

== See also ==
- List of books and films about Nicaragua
