= Morazán =

Morazán is a name shared by several places in Central America, all named in honour of 19th century regional statesman Francisco Morazán:

- Morazán Department, El Salvador
- Francisco Morazán Department, Honduras
- Morazán, Yoro, municipality in Honduras
- Morazán, El Progreso, a city in El Progreso Department, Guatemala
- Puerto Morazán, a town in Chinandega Department, Nicaragua
- Morazán (film), a 2017 Honduran film
