= Frank Pineda =

- Born: 21 January 1956 (age 70); Managua, Nicaragua
- Occupations: Filmmaker, director of photography, cameraman
- Years active: Since 1979
- Partner: Florence Jaugey
- Website: http://www.camilafilms.com/

Frank Pineda (21 January 1956, Estelí, Nicaragua) is a Nicaraguan filmmaker, producer, director of photography, and cameraman. He started his career as a war correspondent and cameraman in Nicaragua in the late 1970s. He was a founding member of INCINE, the Nicaraguan Institute of Cinema, (in Spanish Instituto Nicaragüense de Cine). He co-founded with his partner, the French filmmaker Florence Jaugey, Camila Films (Nicaragua) an independent film production company based in Managua.

== Education and professional career ==
Pineda started his career when he enrolled in an intensive course in cinematography in Mexico City and soon after started to work as war correspondent and cameraman for international news and television networks as BBC, Channel 4, PBS, and the Hallmark Channel. He was a founding member of INCINE, the Nicaraguan Institute of Cinema (in Spanish Instituto Nicaragüense de Cine). While at this organization he participated in the making of 50 short documentaries about the Nicaraguan Revolution. Pineda co-directed the first one of these documentaries, that they called Noticieros, with another Nicaraguan filmmaker Ramiro Lacayo, titled Primer Noticiero INCINE (1979) and it won the Saúl Yelín Award from the Committee of Filmmakers of Latin America at the First Edition (1979) of the Havana Film Festival, Cuba. Pineda has worked in over 100 short and feature films and documentaries.

== Filmmaking in 1980s Nicaragua ==
During the 1980s Pineda continued to work in an assortment of cinematographic works. He worked as a cameraman in the documentary "Fire from the Mountain"(1987), directed by the Academy Award Winner director Deborah Shaffer, this movie was nominated for an Emmy and participated at the Sundance Film Festival and the New York Film Festival. He worked as director of photography for the Universal Studios Walker (1987) by the British director Alex Cox with lead American actor Ed Harris. Towards the end of the 1980s he received an award at the Huesca International Film Festival, Spain, for a black and white short film he directed titled "The Man with One Note" (in Spanish El hombre de una sola nota).

== Camila Films ==
In 1989 Pineda co-founded with his partner, the French filmmaker Florence Jaugey, Camila Films(Nicaragua) an independent film producing company based in Managua, Nicaragua. Pineda and Jaugey collaborate through Camila Films with the purpose to bring awareness, through movies and documentaries, of the different facets of the every detail reality of life in Nicaragua from a social point of view and with an emphasis on the poorest segments of the population.

In the mid 1990s, Pineda worked as director of photography for the film Carla's Song (1996), by the British director Ken Loach. He was also director of photography for the movie La Yuma(2010) directed by Jaugey, a film selected as the Nicaraguan entry for the Academy Awards in 2011. In addition this was the first feature film produced in Nicaragua in 20 years.

== Selected filmography ==
Year	Work	Comments
1980	‘’INCINE: 1979 Año de la Liberación	Director (Documentary)
1989	El hombre de una sola nota	Director, Premio Festival Internacional de Cine de Huesca, Spain
1981	Betún y sangre	Director (short)
1987	‘’En el humo de ésta época	Director of photography
1987	‘’Walker’’	Director of photography
1987	Fire from the Mountain “Fuego desde la montaña’’	Director of photography
1988	Blue Azul	Director of photography
1993	Scared to Death Muerto de Miedo	Director of photography (Documentary)
1996	‘’Carla’s Song	Director de photography, directed by Ken Loach
2001	“De Alskande i San Fernando’’	Director of photography
2010	La Yuma	Director of photography (feature film, drama) selected for the Academy Awards 2011
2012	Bananas!*	Director of photography (Documentary)
2013	School DaysDías de clase	Director of photography
2014	Naked Screen La Pantalla Desnuda	Director of photography
