= Alsino and the Condor =

- Cuban theatrical release poster
- Directed by: Miguel Littín
- Written by: Miguel Littín; Tomas Perez Turrent; Isadora Aguirre
- Based on: Alsino by Pedro Prado
- Produced by: Ramiro Lacayo; Hernan Littin
- Starring: Dean Stockwell; Alan Esquivel
- Cinematography: Jorge Herrera; Pablo Martinez
- Music by: Leo Brouwer
- Production companies: Instituto Nicaraguense de Cine (INCINE); Productora Cinematográfica Latinoamericana de México; Cooperativa Cinematográfica Costarricense; Instituto Cubano del Arte e Industrias Cinematográficos (ICAIC); CRFC; Latin-American Film Releasing Corp. NFI
- Distributed by: Médiathèque des Trois Mondes; Libra Cinema 5
- Release date: 1 May 1982 (New York City)
- Running time: 89 minutes
- Countries: Nicaragua; Mexico; Cuba
- Languages: Spanish; English

Alsino and the Condor (Spanish: Alsino y el cóndor) is a 1982 Nicaraguan film directed by Chilean filmmaker Miguel Littín. It was nominated for the Academy Award for Best Foreign Language Film. It won the Golden Prize at the 13th Moscow International Film Festival. The film was a co-production between Nicaragua, Mexico and Cuba. The film is loosely based on the novel Alsino by Chilean writer Pedro Prado, and is set during the Nicaraguan Revolution. It starred Dean Stockwell.

== Plot ==
Alsino, a 10 or 12-year-old boy, lives with his grandmother in a remote area of Nicaragua. Trying to be like any other child, he climbs trees with a friend, dreaming of flying, jumping several times from the top of a huge tree believing that "Amsterdam" is the magical word that will make him fly.

The Central American country is engulfed in the final stages of a civil conflict, a war between rebels of the Sandinista National Liberation Front and government troops that is about to explode. An American military advisor, arriving in the community to establish a preparation camp, seeking to carry out prevention actions to avoid direct attacks in the "red zones," meets Alsino, who had been brought to him by guards after trying to escape from a battalion patrolling the area. He invites Alsino to climb into his helicopter, "El Cóndor," and takes him on a flight, although impressed, Alsino says, "I want to fly but without help."

In one of his attempts to fly, Alsino jumps from the tall tree and falls abruptly to the ground; the impact dislocates his shoulder and neck, leaving him with a hunchback. While he heals, he hears "noises" inside him that foreshadow destruction in his home. At the request of his grandmother, he goes down to the nearby town to sell a saddle inherited from his disappeared grandfather, probably a member of the Dutch navy in 1942. There he has his first drink of rum and is taken to a brothel where he only talks with the girl, all this in wartime.

Alsino witnesses the cruelties that the military forces inflict on those suspected of being insurgents, and in one of these raids, he meets several characters who awaken in him a longing for freedom, generating sympathy towards the Sandinista rebels. When they find him hiding in the mountains, the leader of the group offers to accompany and protect him on the journey.

After learning of his grandmother's death, and following the failure of "Operation Cóndor," whose helicopter is bayoneted and shot down, Alsino decides to join the guerrilla ranks where he becomes fully involved in the conflict.

== Cast ==
- Dean Stockwell as Frank
- Alan Esquivel as Alsino
- Carmen Bunster as Alsino's Grandmother
- Alejandro Parodi as The Major
- Delia Casanova as Rosaria
- Marta Lorena Pérez as Lucia
- Reynaldo Miravalles as Don Nazario, the Birdman
- Marcelo Gaete as Lucia's Grandfather
- Jan Kees De Roy as Dutch Adviser

== Awards ==
=== Wins ===
- Moscow International Film Festival - Golden Prize, Miguel Littin, 1983.

=== Nominations ===
- Academy Awards - Best Foreign Language Film, 1983.

== See also ==
- List of submissions to the 55th Academy Awards for Best Foreign Language Film
- List of Nicaraguan submissions for the Academy Award for Best Foreign Language Film
