= Carmen Bunster =

Chilean actress

- Born: 6 January 1918; Buenos Aires, Argentina
- Died: 23 April 2012 (aged 94); San José, Costa Rica
- Occupation: Actress

Carmen Bunster (6 January 1918 – 23 April 2012) was a Chilean film and theatre actress.

== In Chile ==
From 1950 to 1973, Carmen Bunster participated actively in the theater company of the University of Chile, working alongside other performers such as Mario Lorca, Carmen Barros, María Cánepa, Bélgica Castro, Kerry Keller and Diana Sanz, among others. In 1972, Bunster collaborated with Isabel Parra and Inti-Illimani for the studio album Canto para una semilla, with cantatas written by Luis Advis and based on texts by Violeta Parra. One of Bunster's most famous performances was her role in a 1956 production of Germán Luco Cruchaga's 1928 play La viuda de Apablaza, which tells the story of a young widower who falls in love with one of her late husband's farm workers.

== Exile ==
In the wake of the 1973 Chilean coup d'état, Bunster fled Chile in 1974 and would never return. She would continue her career as an actress even as she lived in multiple different countries. The most notable of these was the Academy Awards nominated Alsino and the Condor, directed by Miguel Littín. She finally settled in Costa Rica, where she was recognized on 16 December 2003 with the Union of Independent Theaters's Prize. She would reside in Costa Rica until her death on 23 April 2012 of natural causes.

== Selected filmography ==
- Blood Conflict (1953)
