= Ghiath Matar =

- Born: October 8, 1986; Darayya, Syria
- Died: September 2011 (aged 24); Syria
- Cause of death: Torture
- Occupation(s): Tailor, Political Activist

Ghiath Matar was a Syrian activist who became known for giving flowers to soldiers in his home town of Darayya.

== Death ==
Ghiath was arrested on 6 September 2011 by the security forces of the Syrian government. Four days later, his body was returned to his family with scars and sores resulting from severe torture. His funeral was attended by the ambassadors of the United States, Japan, Germany, France and Denmark. When Ghiath died, his wife was expecting their first baby. The baby was named after his father.

Ghiath Matar became a symbol of peaceful resistance of the Syrian revolution.

A documentary on Matar, by the filmmaker Sam Kadi, Little Gandhi, was a winner at the Independent European Film Festival in April 2016, winning the Ahmed Khedr Award for Excellence in Arab Filmmaking.
