= Wake Up Mom =

- Theatrical release poster
- Directed by: Arianne Benedetti
- Written by: Arianne Benedetti
- Produced by: Regina Barletta; Arianne Benedetti; Moises Briceño; Temi Diaz; Maria Cecilia Arias G.
- Starring: Arianne Benedetti
- Cinematography: Nathan Wilson
- Music by: Pedro Onetto
- Production company: TreeHouse Studios Panamá
- Release date: May 30, 2024
- Running time: 99 minutes
- Country: Panama
- Language: Spanish

Wake Up Mom (Spanish: Despierta mamá) is a 2024 Panamanian action thriller drama film directed, written, produced and starred by Arianne Benedetti. It is about the odyssey that a mother will undertake after her daughter mysteriously disappears after suffering an accident in the town where they live. The rest of the cast is made up Erick Elías, Mila Romedetti, Ana Alejandra Carrizo, Abraham Pino, Chris Oberto, Ingrid De Ycaza, Andrés Morales and Caio Mena. The film was chosen as the Panamanian entry for Best International Feature Film at the 97th Academy Awards.

== Synopsis ==
Ali decides to move to a small town in the mountains with her little daughter Sofía after her devastating separation from her husband. Weeks later, she will be immersed in the mysterious atmosphere of the place and then have an accident and realize that her daughter has disappeared. As a consequence, she will undertake a tireless search to find her daughter's whereabouts.

== Cast ==
The actors participating in this film are:

- Arianne Benedetti as Ali Galiano
- Mila Romedetti as Sofía Landa
- Erick Elías
- Ana Alejandra Carrizo
- Carlos Alfredo Lopez as Sergeant
- Abraham Pino
- Temi Diaz as Jose
- Moises Briceño
- Chris Oberto
- Ash Olivera
- Liza Hernández
- Luis Arteaga
- Ingrid De Ycaza
- Marco Oses
- Christopher Oberto
- Andrés Morales
- Caio Mena

== Production ==
Principal photography began on December 2, 2022, in El Valle de Antón, Panama lasting 5 weeks.

== Release ==
It premiered on May 30, 2024, in Panamanian theaters and was later screened on June 11, 2024, at the 39th Guadalajara International Film Festival. The film managed to sell its distribution rights to be screened in Mexico, Central America and the Caribbean. It is scheduled to premiere on September 19, 2024, in Mexican theaters.

== See also ==
- List of submissions to the 97th Academy Awards for Best International Feature Film
- List of Panamanian submissions for the Academy Award for Best International Feature Film
