= List of submissions to the 90th Academy Awards for Best Foreign Language Film =

2017 Best Foreign Language Film submissions
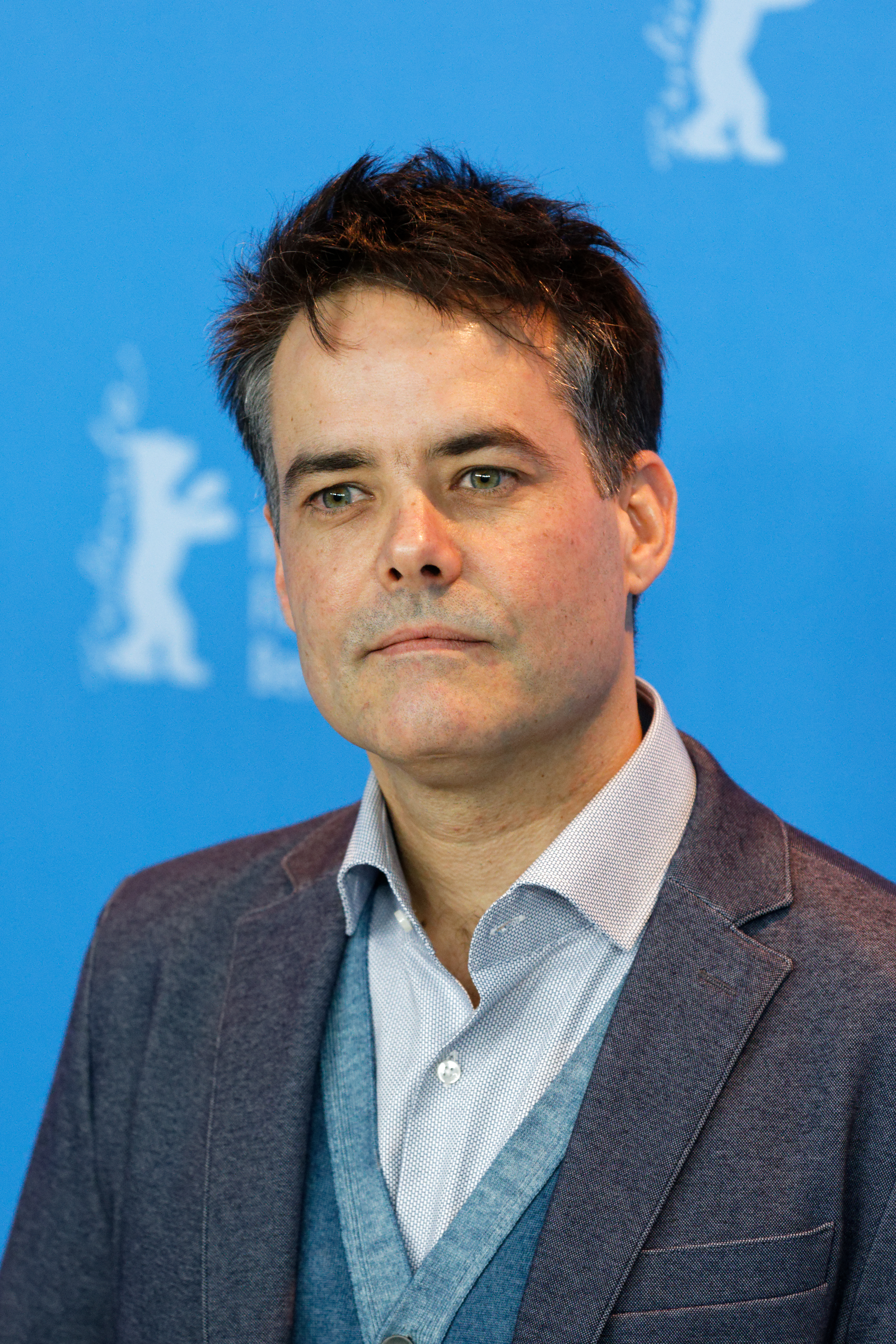
- Sebastián Lelio directed A Fantastic Woman, which won the year's award.

Highlights
- Oscar winner: (Chile) A Fantastic Woman
- Submissions: 92
- Debuts: 6
- Total eligible: 92

This is a list of submissions to the 90th Academy Awards for the Best Foreign Language Film. The Academy of Motion Picture Arts and Sciences (AMPAS) has invited the film industries of various countries to submit their best film for the Academy Award for Best Foreign Language Film every year since the award was created in 1956. The award is presented annually by the Academy to a feature-length motion picture produced outside the United States that contains primarily non-English dialogue. The Foreign Language Film Award Committee oversees the process and reviews all the submitted films.

For the 90th Academy Awards, the submitted motion pictures must have first been released theatrically in their respective countries between 1 October 2016 and 30 September 2017. The deadline for submissions to the Academy was 2 October 2017. 92 countries submitted films and were found to be eligible by AMPAS and screened for voters. Haiti, Honduras, Laos, Mozambique, Senegal, and Syria submitted films for the first time. After the 9-film shortlist was announced on 14 December 2017, the five nominees were announced on 23 January 2018.

Chile won the award for the first time with A Fantastic Woman by Sebastián Lelio.

== Submissions ==
Submitting country	Film title used in nomination	Original title	Language(s)	Director(s)	Result
Afghanistan	A Letter to the President	نامه‌ای به رییس‌جمهور	Dari	Roya Sadat	Not nominated
Albania	Daybreak	Dita zë fill	Albanian	Gentian Koçi	Not nominated
Algeria	Road to Istanbul	La route d'Istanbul	French, English, Turkish, Arabic	Rachid Bouchareb	Not nominated
Argentina	Zama		Spanish, Toba Qom, Pilagá, Mbyá Guaraní, Brazilian Portuguese	Lucrecia Martel	Not nominated
Armenia	Yeva	Եվա / یه‌وا	Armenian	Anahit Abad	Not nominated
Australia	The Space Between		Italian, English	Ruth Borgobello	Not nominated
Austria	Happy End		French, English	Michael Haneke	Not nominated
Azerbaijan	Pomegranate Orchard	Nar bağı	Azerbaijani	Ilgar Najaf	Not nominated
Bangladesh	The Cage	খাঁচা	Bengali	Akram Khan	Not nominated
Belgium	Racer and the Jailbird	Le fidèle	French, Flemish, Albanian	Michaël R. Roskam	Not nominated
Bolivia	Dark Skull	Viejo calavera	Spanish, Aymara	Kiro Russo	Not nominated
Bosnia and Herzegovina	Men Don't Cry	Muškarci ne plaču	Bosnian, Serbian, Croatian	Alen Drljević	Not nominated
Brazil	Bingo: The King of the Mornings	Bingo: O Rei das Manhãs	Brazilian Portuguese, English	Daniel Rezende	Not nominated
Bulgaria	Glory	Слава	Bulgarian	Kristina Grozeva and Petar Valchanov	Not nominated
Cambodia	First They Killed My Father	មុនដំបូងខ្មែរក្រហមសម្លាប់ប៉ារបស់ខ្ញុំ	Khmer, English, French, Vietnamese	Angelina Jolie	Not nominated
Canada	Hochelaga, Land of Souls	Hochelaga, terre des âmes	French, English, Mohawk, Algonquin, Latin, Arabic, Haitian Creole	François Girard	Not nominated
Chile	A Fantastic Woman	Una mujer fantástica	Spanish	Sebastián Lelio	Won Academy Award
China	Wolf Warrior 2	战狼2	Mandarin, English, French	Wu Jing	Not nominated
Colombia	Guilty Men	Pariente	Spanish	Iván Gaona	Not nominated
Costa Rica	The Sound of Things	El sonido de las cosas	Spanish	Ariel Escalante	Not nominated
Croatia	Quit Staring at My Plate	Ne gledaj mi u pijat	Croatian	Hana Jušić	Not nominated
Czech Republic	Ice Mother	Bába z ledu	Czech	Bohdan Sláma	Not nominated
Denmark	You Disappear	Du forsvinder	Danish, Swedish, English	Peter Schønau Fog	Not nominated
Dominican Republic	Woodpeckers	Carpinteros	Spanish, Carpinteo Sign Language	José María Cabral	Not nominated
Ecuador	Alba		Spanish	Ana Cristina Barragán	Not nominated
Egypt	Sheikh Jackson	شيخ جاكسون	Arabic	Amr Salama	Not nominated
Estonia	November		Estonian, German, Italian	Rainer Sarnet	Not nominated
Finland	Tom of Finland		Finnish, English, German	Dome Karukoski	Not nominated
France	BPM (Beats per Minute)	120 battements par minute	French	Robin Campillo	Not nominated
Georgia	Scary Mother	საშიში დედა	Georgian	Ana Urushadze	Not nominated
Germany	In the Fade	Aus dem Nichts	German, English, Turkish, Greek	Fatih Akin	Made shortlist
Greece	Amerika Square	Πλατεία Αμερικής	Greek, English, Arabic	Yannis Sakaridis	Not nominated
Haiti	Ayiti Mon Amour		Haitian Creole, French, English, Japanese	Guetty Felin	Not nominated
Honduras	Morazán		Spanish	Hispano Durón	Not nominated
Hong Kong	Mad World	一念無明	Cantonese	Wong Chun	Not nominated
Hungary	On Body and Soul	Testről és lélekről	Hungarian	Ildikó Enyedi	Nominated
Iceland	Under the Tree	Undir trénu	Icelandic	Hafsteinn Gunnar Sigurðsson	Not nominated
India	Newton	न्यूटन	Hindi, Gondi	Amit V. Masurkar	Not nominated
Indonesia	Leftovers	Turah	Tegal Javanese	Wicaksono Wisnu Legowo	Not nominated
Iran	Breath	نفس	Persian	Narges Abyar	Not nominated
Iraq	Reseba: The Dark Wind	العاصفة السوداء / Reṣeba	Northern Kurdish, Arabic	Hussein Hassan	Not nominated
Ireland	Song of Granite		Irish, English	Pat Collins	Not nominated
Israel	Foxtrot	פוֹקְסטְרוֹט	Hebrew, German, Arabic	Samuel Maoz	Made shortlist
Italy	A Ciambra		Reggino Calabrian, Italian, English, Twi	Jonas Carpignano	Not nominated
Japan	Her Love Boils Bathwater	湯を沸かすほどの熱い愛	Japanese, Japanese Sign Language	Ryōta Nakano	Not nominated
Kazakhstan	The Road to Mother	Анаға апарар жол / Дорога к матери	Kazakh, Russian	Akan Satayev	Not nominated
Kenya	Kati Kati		Swahili, English, Sheng	Mbithi Masya	Not nominated
Kosovo	Unwanted	T'padashtun	Dutch, Albanian, English	Edon Rizvanolli	Not nominated
Kyrgyzstan	Centaur	Кентавр	Kyrgyz, Russian Sign Language, Russian, Arabic	Aktan Arym Kubat	Not nominated
Laos	Dearest Sister	ນ້ອງຮັກ	Lao, Estonian, Thai, English	Mattie Do	Not nominated
Latvia	The Chronicles of Melanie	Melānijas hronika	Latvian, Russian, German	Viestur Kairish	Not nominated
Lebanon	The Insult	قضية رقم 23 / L'insulte	Arabic	Ziad Doueiri	Nominated
Lithuania	Frost	Šerkšnas / Іній / Szron	Lithuanian, Ukrainian, Russian, English, French, Polish	Šarūnas Bartas	Not nominated
Luxembourg	Barrage		French	Laura Schroeder	Not nominated
Mexico	Tempestad		Spanish	Tatiana Huezo	Not nominated
Mongolia	The Children of Genghis	Чингисийн хүүхдүүд	Mongolian	Zolbayar Dorj	Not nominated
Morocco	Razzia	غزية	Arabic, French, Central Atlas Tamazight	Nabil Ayouch	Not nominated
Mozambique	The Train of Salt and Sugar	Comboio de Sal e Açúcar	Portuguese	Licínio Azevedo	Not nominated
Nepal	White Sun	सेतो सूर्य	Nepali	Deepak Rauniyar	Not nominated
Netherlands	Layla M.		Dutch, Arabic, English	Mijke de Jong	Not nominated
New Zealand	One Thousand Ropes	Maea e afe	Samoan, English, Māori, Khmer	Tusi Tamasese	Not nominated
Norway	Thelma		Norwegian, Swedish	Joachim Trier	Not nominated
Pakistan	Saawan	ساون	Urdu	Farhan Alam	Not nominated
Palestine	Wajib	واجب	Arabic	Annemarie Jacir	Not nominated
Panama	Beyond Brotherhood	Más que hermanos	Spanish, English	Arianne Benedetti	Not nominated
Paraguay	The Gold Seekers	Los buscadores	Spanish, Guarani, Jopara	Juan Carlos Maneglia and Tana Schémbori	Not nominated
Peru	Rosa Chumbe		Spanish	Jonatan Relayze	Not nominated
Philippines	Birdshot		Filipino	Mikhail Red	Not nominated
Poland	Spoor	Pokot	Polish	Agnieszka Holland	Not nominated
Portugal	Saint George	São Jorge	Portuguese, Brazilian Portuguese	Marco Martins	Not nominated
Romania	The Fixer	Fixeur	Romanian, French	Adrian Sitaru	Not nominated
Russia	Loveless	Нелюбовь	Russian	Andrey Zvyagintsev	Nominated
Senegal	Félicité		Lingala, French	Alain Gomis	Made shortlist
Serbia	Requiem for Mrs. J.	Реквијем за госпођу Ј.	Serbian	Bojan Vuletić	Not nominated
Singapore	Pop Aye		Thai, Isan	Kirsten Tan	Not nominated
Slovakia	The Line	Čiara / Межа	Slovak, Ukrainian	Peter Bebjak	Not nominated
Slovenia	The Miner	Rudar	Slovene, Bosnian	Hanna Slak	Not nominated
South Africa	The Wound	Inxeba	Xhosa, Afrikaans, English	John Trengove	Made shortlist
South Korea	A Taxi Driver	택시운전사	Korean, English, German, Japanese	Jang Hoon	Not nominated
Spain	Summer 1993	Estiu 1993	Catalan	Carla Simón	Not nominated
Sweden	The Square		Swedish, English, Danish	Ruben Östlund	Nominated
Switzerland	The Divine Order	Die göttliche Ordnung	Swiss German, German, English, Italian	Petra Biondina Volpe	Not nominated
Syria	Little Gandhi		Arabic, English	Sam Kadi	Not nominated
Taiwan	Small Talk	日常對話	Taiwanese Hokkien, Mandarin	Huang Hui-zhen	Not nominated
Thailand	By the Time It Gets Dark	ดาวคะนอง	Thai	Anocha Suwichakornpong	Not nominated
Tunisia	The Last of Us	اخر واحد فينا	No dialogue	Ala Eddine Slim	Not nominated
Turkey	Ayla: The Daughter of War	Ayla / 아일라	Turkish, Korean, English, Mandarin	Can Ulkay	Not nominated
Ukraine	Black Level	Рівень чорного	No dialogue	Valentyn Vasyanovych	Not nominated
United Kingdom	My Pure Land	میری پاک زمین	Urdu	Sarmad Masud	Not nominated
Uruguay	Another Story of the World	Otra historia del mundo	Spanish, Uruguayan Portuguese	Guillermo Casanova	Not nominated
Venezuela	El Inca		Spanish	Ignacio Castillo Cottin	Not nominated
Vietnam	Father and Son	Cha cõng con	Vietnamese	Lương Đình Dũng	Not nominated

== Notes ==
- (North Macedonia) Macedonia decided not to submit a film for consideration this year. According to the committee, two films were submitted to their consideration: Golden Five by Goran Trenchovski and When the Day Had No Name by Teona Strugar Mitevska. However, they found that neither of the submitted films fulfilled the aesthetic or narrative criteria to be the Macedonian Oscar nominee.
- Ghana and the United Arab Emirates were scheduled to submit a film for the first time, but neither country sent a film for consideration.
