= Blood Conflict =

1953 film

- Directed by: Vinicio Valdivia
- Written by: Vinicio Valdivia
- Release date: 1953
- Country: Chile
- Language: Spanish

Blood Conflict (Spanish: Conflicto de sangre) is a 1953 Chilean film directed by Vinicio Valdivia.

== Cast ==
- Marcela Benítez
- Carmen Bunster
- Eugenio Guzmán
- Héctor Márquez
- Claudio Taít

== Bibliography ==
- Terry Ramsaye. Motion Picture and Television Almanac. Quigley Publications, 1954.
