= List of Panamanian submissions for the Academy Award for Best International Feature Film =

Best International Feature Film submissions from Panama

Highlights
- Debut: 2014
- Submissions: 13
- Nominations: none
- Oscar winners: none

Panama submitted a film for the Academy Award for Best International Feature Film (Note: The category was previously named the Academy Award for Best Foreign Language Film, but this was changed to the Academy Award for Best International Feature Film in April 2019, after the Academy deemed the word "Foreign" to be outdated.) for the first time in 2014. The award is handed out annually by the United States Academy of Motion Picture Arts and Sciences to a feature-length motion picture produced outside the United States that contains primarily non-English dialogue. It was not created until the 1956 Academy Awards, in which a competitive Academy Award of Merit, known as the Best Foreign Language Film Award, was created for non-English speaking films, and has been given annually since.

As of 2026, Panama has submitted thirteen films, but none of them were nominated.

== Submissions ==
The Academy of Motion Picture Arts and Sciences has invited the film industries of various countries to submit their best film for the Academy Award for Best International Feature Film since 1956. The International Feature Film Committee oversees the process and reviews all the submitted films. Following this, they vote via secret ballot to determine the five nominees for the award.

Plaza Catedral (2021) advanced to the December shortlists, but it was not nominated.

All the films submitted are primary in Spanish. Below is a list of the films that have been submitted by Panama for review by the Academy for the award by year and the respective Academy Awards ceremony.

Year (Ceremony)	Film title used in nomination	Original title	Director	Result
2014 (87th)	Invasion	Invasión	Abner Benaim	Not nominated
2015 (88th)	Box 25	Caja 25	Mercedes Arias, Delfina Vidal	Not on the Final List
2016 (89th)	Salsipuedes		Ricardo Aguilar Navarro, Manuel Rodríguez	Not nominated
2017 (90th)	Beyond Brotherhood	Más que Hermanos	Arianne Benedetti	Not nominated
2018 (91st)	Ruben Blades Is Not My Name	Yo No Me Llamo Rubén Blades	Abner Benaim	Not nominated
2019 (92nd)	Everybody Changes	Todos Cambiamos	Arturo Montenegro	Not nominated
2020 (93rd)	Operation Just Cause	Operación Causa Justa	Luis Franco Brantley, Luis Pacheco	Not nominated
2021 (94th)	Plaza Catedral		Abner Benaim	Made shortlist
2022 (95th)	Birthday Boy	Cumpleañero	Arturo Montenegro	Not nominated
2023 (96th)	Tito, Margot & Me	Tito, Margot y yo	Mercedes Arias, Delfina Vidal	Not nominated
2024 (97th)	Wake Up Mom	Despierta mamá	Arianne Benedetti	Not nominated
2025 (98th)	Beloved Tropic	Querido trópico	Ana Endara	Not nominated
2026 (99th)	Chichero		Aarón Bromley, Arturo Montenegro	Pending
