= Lists of Latin American films =

This is a list of films produced and filmed in Latin America, ordered by country of origin.

== North and Central America ==
=== Costa Rica ===
- Alsino y el cóndor (1982)
- Asesinato en el Meneo (2001)
- Caribe (2004)
- El Fin (2011)
- Gestación (2009)
- Password: Una mirada en la oscuridad (2002)
- El Regreso (2011)
- El Sanatorio (2010)
- The Uprising (1980)

=== El Salvador ===
- The Black Pirates (El Pirata Negro) (1954)
- Solo de noche vienes (1966)
- Voces Innocentes (2005)

=== Guatemala ===
- Ambiguity: Crónica de un Sueño Americano (2015)
- Donde Acaban los Caminos (2004)
- Capsulas (2011)
- El Norte (1983), filmed in California and Mexico, about Guatemalans
- Puro Mula (2011)
- El Regreso de Lencho (2011)

=== Honduras ===
- 4 Catrachos en Apuros (2016)
- 11 Cipotes (2014)
- Amor y Frijoles (2009)
- Anita, La Cazadora de Insectos (2001)
- Lara (2003)
- Libre Mente en Cerrado (2002)
- No Hay Tierra Sin Dueño (2003)
- ¿Quién Paga la Cuenta? (2013)
- Second Coming (2008)
- Spirit of My Mother (1999)
- The Zwickys (2015)

=== Nicaragua ===
- Alsino y el cóndor (1982)
- The Art of Travel (2007)
- El Center fielder (1985)
- El Espectro de la Guerra (1988)
- Estos sí pasarán (1985)
- El Inmortal (2005)
- Llamada de la muerte (1960)
- Metal y vidrio (2002)
- Sandino (1990)
- Sexto sentido (2001), TV series
- The World Stopped Watching (2003)

=== Panama ===
- Chance (2010), featuring Francisco Gattorno, Isabella Santo Domingo, and Aida Morales, and with the presentation of Rosa Lorenzo

== South America ==
=== Chile ===
- Coronación (2000)
- Estadio Nacional (2002)
- Machuca (2004)
- Mi Mejor Enemigo (2005)
- Sexo con Amor (2003)
- Taxi Para Tres (2001)

=== Ecuador ===
- Crónicas (2004)
- Qué Tan Lejos (2006)
- Ratas Ratones y Rateros (1999)

=== Uruguay ===
- A dios momo (2006)
- A las cinco en punto (2004)
- A pesar de todo (2003)
- Acratas (2000)
- Alguien debe morir (2002)
- Alguien lo tiene que hacer (2004)
- Alma mater (2004)
- Almohadón de plumas (1988)
- Ana Was Here (2005)
- Andrajo (1998)
- Aparte (2002)
- Arrinconados (1992)
- El Arte de resistir (2004)
- Australia (2004/II)
- Azul (2004)
- Souls on the Coast (1923)
