= Little Gandhi =

2016 film

- Film poster
- Directed by: Sam Kadi
- Written by: Sam Kadi
- Produced by: Sam Kadi
- Edited by: Carl Ballou
- Music by: James Stonehouse
- Release date: March 2016
- Running time: 93 minutes
- Country: Syria
- Language: Arabic

Little Gandhi is a 2016 Syrian documentary film directed by Sam Kadi. It was selected as the Syrian entry for the Best Foreign Language Film at the 90th Academy Awards, but it was not nominated. It was the first time Syria had sent a film for consideration for the Best Foreign Language film.

== Synopsis ==
A documentary film about the life of Syrian activist Ghiath Matar, whose advocacy for nonviolent protest gave him the nickname "Little Gandhi".

== See also ==
- List of submissions to the 90th Academy Awards for Best Foreign Language Film
- List of Syrian submissions for the Academy Award for Best Foreign Language Film
