= Once Upon a Time in Panama =

- Theatrical release poster
- Directed by: Elmis Castillo
- Written by: Elmis Castillo
- Produced by: Elmis Castillo; Noa Levana
- Starring: Elmis Castillo
- Cinematography: Aaron Bromley
- Edited by: Juan Zelaya
- Music by: Eduardo Charry; Rodrigo Denis
- Release date: March 21, 2024
- Running time: 100 minutes
- Country: Panama
- Language: Spanish

Once Upon a Time in Panama (Spanish: Érase una vez en Panamá) is a 2024 Panamanian comedy film written, co-produced, starred and directed by Elmis Castillo. It premiered on March 21, 2024, in Panamanian theaters.

== Synopsis ==
Ermisendo, a janitor, opens the door to his boss Domingo and is unjustly accused of the largest fentanyl theft in Panamanian history. This sends Ermisendo on the run until he meets Tito, a former bushrangers, who tells him his life story about how he managed to dismantle a child trafficking ring by doing the right thing. This inspires Ermisendo to confront those who framed him... but at what cost?

== Cast ==
- Elmis Castillo as Ermisendo / Tito
- Luis Gotti as Don Tito
- Hermes Mendoza as Adonis / Ome
- Marcell Chávez as Machomonte
- Robert De Luca as Lombana Indigenous
- Diego De Obaldía as Doctor of Obaldía
- Mariano Abdel Gonzalez as Doctor Gonzalez
- Marelissa Him as Verónica
- Edward José as Policeman
- Domil Leira as Vernon
- Alex Mariscal as Domingo
- Gabriel Pérez Matteo as Nito
- Ivan Peña as Roux Indigenous
- RoChia as Don Mario
- Diego Ruzzarin as Doctor Ruzzarin
- Abdiel Tapia as Juan / Elephant Man
- Carlos Tibbet as Martin Indigenous
- Marcelo Villareal as Celador / Cholo
- Aaron Zebede as Doctor Gallego

== Production ==
Principal photography wrapped on January 9, 2024, lasting 18 days in Volcán Barú, Chorcha, and Bayano Caves.

== Reception ==
In its second week in theaters, the film sold 30,000 tickets.
