= Florence Jaugey =

French-Nicaraguan actress-filmmaker

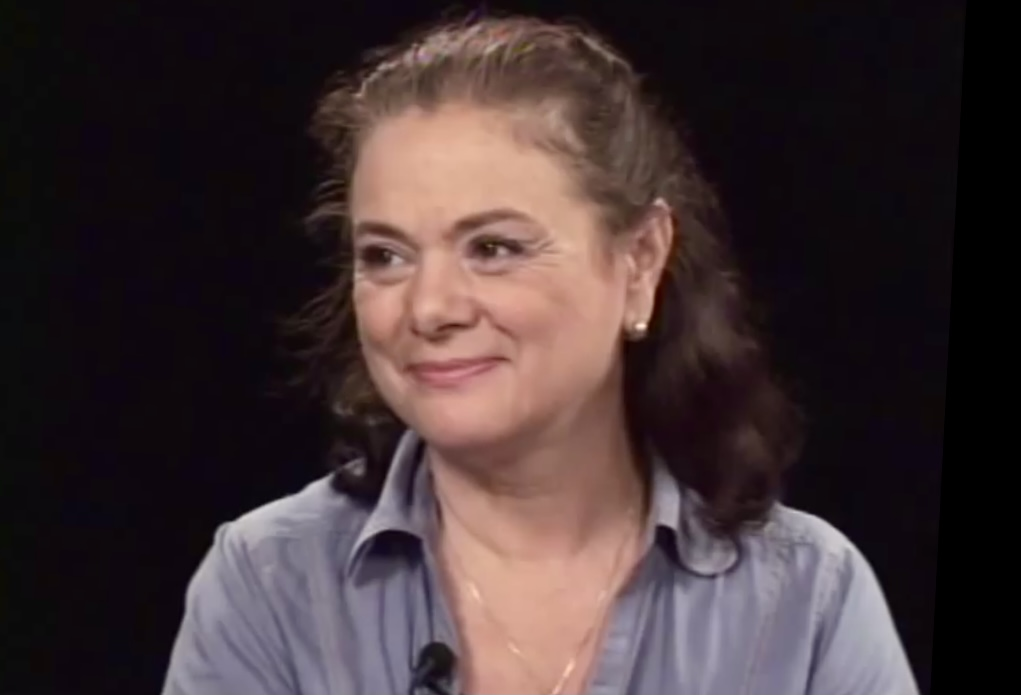
- Jaugey in 2014
- Born: 22 June 1959 (age 66); Nice, France
- Education: ENSATT Paris, France
- Occupations: Movie director, screenwriter, actress, producer
- Years active: Since 1979
- Partner: Frank Pineda
- Children: 2
- Website: https://www.camilafilms.com/

Florence Jaugey (born 22 June 1959) is a French movie director, actress, producer, and screenwriter who lives in Nicaragua. In 1989 Jaugey co-founded with her partner and Nicaraguan filmmaker Frank Pineda, Camila Films (Nicaragua), an independent film production company based in Managua. In 1998, her film Cinema Alcázar, won the Silver Bear award at the Berlin International Film Festival Berlinale.

== Biography ==
Florence Jaugey was born in Nice, France in 1959 and studied drama in Paris at the ENSATT (École Nationale Supérieure des Arts et Techniques du Théâtre). She worked as an actress during the 1980s. In 1984 she traveled to Nicaragua to be the lead actress in the movie El Señor Presidente directed by the Cuban director Manuel Octavio Gómez.

== Camila Films ==
In 1989, together with Frank Pineda a Nicaraguan filmmaker and her partner, they set up in Managua, Camila Films Production Company, an independent film company, directing and producing several short and documentary films, and one feature film La Yuma (2010). A second feature film titled Naked Screen (2014), original title in Spanish La Pantalla Desnuda.

Jaugey's filmmaking has focused on the poverty-stricken people of Nicaragua, such as her short film Cinema Alcázar, winner of the Silver Bear at Berlinale (1998) the first one for Nicaragua. This documentary is about the people that live in the ruins of an earthquake destroyed movie house from the 1950s located in the center of Managua. The documentary The Island of the Lost Children (2001), original title in Spanish La Isla de los Niños Perdidos, filmed in jail and winner of the Society of Authors Award at the International Documentary Festival Cinéma du Réel in Paris in 2002.

One of her last works, a documentary titled Deceit (2012), original title in Spanish El engaño, portrays the lives of seven women who survived human trafficking and how they struggle to cope with their experiences leading some of them to work for at-risk centers for girls. In the documentary Jaugey travels through Central America exposing the conditions of violence against women.

In 2009 Jaugey directed a drama, her first feature film, titled La Yuma. The film was selected as the Nicaraguan entry for the Best Foreign Language Film at the 83rd Academy Awards but the film didn't make it to the final list. This movie was the first full-length feature film in 20 years from Nicaragua as reported by the World Bank in a paper titled The Projection of Development by Lewis, Rodgers, and Woolcock. Her second feature film, La Pantalla Desnuda (The Naked Screen) is expected to be released in 2014.

== Recognition ==
In 2010 Florence Jaugey received the Order Rubén Darío for Cultural Independence.

== Filmography ==
Year	Title	Comment
1984	El Señor Presidente (Mr. President)	(Actress) (Film directed by Manuel Octavio Gómez
1990	Retrato de la Paz (Portrait of Peace)	Documentary
1992	La Hora de los Generales (The Hour of the Generals)	Documentary
1993	Muerto de Miedo (Scared to Death)	Documentary
1997	Cinema Alcázar	Short film, Jury Prize Silver Bear 1998 Berlinale
1997	El Que Todo lo Puede (The Almighty One)	Documentary
1999	El Día que me Quieras (The Day that You Love Me)	Documentary - filmed in the style cinéma vérité
2001	La Isla de los Niños Perdidos (The Island of the Lost Children)	Documentary - Winner of the Society of Authors Award at Cinéma du Réel, Paris (2002)
2004	De niña a Madre (Girls to Mothers) Chapter 1	Documentary
2005	Historia de Rosa (Rosa's Story)	Documentary
2007	De niña a Madre (Girls to Mothers) Chapter 2	Documentary
2008	Managua, Nicaragua is beautiful Town	Documentary
2009	La Yuma	Action Drama Selected by not nominated for Best Foreign Language Film, 83rd Academy Awards
2012	El Engaño (Deceit)	Short Documentary on human trafficking survivors
2013	Días de Clase (School Days)	Documentary
2014	La Pantalla Desnuda (Naked Screen)	Film
