= Blood, Passion and Coffee =

2019 film

- Film poster
- Directed by: Carlos Membreño
- Produced by: Daniel Fung
- Starring: Alejandra Arias and Carlos Moncada
- Cinematography: Herson Geovany Ortega
- Distributed by: Sin Fronteras Estudios
- Release date: 8 August 2019
- Running time: 123 minutes
- Country: Honduras
- Language: Spanish

Blood, Passion and Coffee (Spanish: Café con sabor a mi tierra) is a 2019 Honduran drama film directed by Carlos Membreño. It was selected as the Honduran entry for the Best International Feature Film at the 92nd Academy Awards, but it was not nominated.

== Plot ==
The Matute family fights to keep their coffee farm afloat despite a series of misfortunes.

== Cast ==
- Carlos Alberto Moncada as Roger Matute
- Ethel Flores as Marcelina de Matute
- Enrique Barrientos as Oscar Matute
- Enrique Romero as Don Napo Matute
- Alejandra Arias as Nancy
- Andrea Chirinos as Mirna Matute
- Mario Raudales as Dagoberto
- Rosa Fortín as Ada
- Jorge Osorto as Don Pedro

== Production ==
The director, Carlos Membreño, was inspired by his own family background in coffee farming; due to the effects of coffee rust, his family was forced to switch to cattle ranching and corn farming. He stated that the film was intended to dignify the work of coffee farmers, reveal the hard work they perform, and illustrate the human side behind every cup of coffee that is consumed.

The film was shot in six locations in Honduras, Germany, and Spain. Filming took place on location in Marcala, a Honduran municipality where quality coffee is produced. The scenes filmed in Bremen, Germany and Tortosa, Spain depict the unloading and consumption of coffee imported from Honduras.

== Reception ==
Amid social media buzz prior to its release, Radio America called Blood, Passion and Coffee a promising Honduran film.

Upon the film's release in August 2019, it received widespread approval on Honduran social media.

Euclides Valdés Flores, writing for El Heraldo, praised the all-star cast but criticized the film's pace, especially in light of the two-hour runtime (an extraordinary length for a commercial Honduran film). He also approved of the film's music (composed by Óscar Ortega, Jay Sabillón, and Mario Raudales, the last of whom also starred in the film) and of the quality of the film's cinematography. Flores opined that the film was Membreño’s best film thus far and the best Honduran production of the past year. Kiko Martinez, writing for Remezcla, similarly praised the use of natural light in the film's cinematography and the authenic emotion of the musical score, but criticized "heavy-handed and overly sentimental scenes."

After the film's release, Membreño announced that he planned to develop a reality show inspired by the film.

== See also ==
- List of submissions to the 92nd Academy Awards for Best International Feature Film
- List of Honduran submissions for the Academy Award for Best International Feature Film
