= Operation Just Cause (film) =

2019 film

- Theatrical release poster
- Directed by: Luis Franco Brantley; Luis Pacheco
- Produced by: Janet Alvarez Gonzalez; Jacobo Silvera
- Starring: Arian Abadi
- Production companies: Jaguar Films; Planet Films
- Distributed by: Netflix
- Release date: 31 October 2019
- Country: Panama
- Language: Spanish
- Budget: $900,000-$1.5 million

Operation Just Cause (Spanish: Operación Causa Justa) is a 2019 Panamanian action war historical drama film directed by Luis Franco Brantley and Luis Pacheco, and produced by executive producers Janet Alvarez Gonzalez and Jacobo Silvera. It was selected as the Panamanian entry for the Best International Feature Film at the 93rd Academy Awards, but it was not nominated.

== Plot ==
In El Chorrillo, a military officer, a fisherman, an American businessman, a prostitute and a young man trying to keep his friends from joining the fighting live through the United States invasion of Panama.

== Cast ==
- Arian Abadi as Calixto
- Anthony Anel as Ismael
- Patricia de Leon as Carmina
- Aaron Zebede as Mayor Robledo
- Janet Alvarez Gonzalez as Colonel Alvarez
- Joavany Alvarez as Lieutenant Colonel Silvera Southcom

== Production ==
The budget was variously reported as totaling $900,000, or initially costing $680,000 before being raised to about $1,500,000 by the end of the production due to the scale of the film. The film was a Panamanian production made with Colombian support, with co-director Luis Pacheco describing the movie as aiming to "keep this history alive so that it is not forgotten. (The invasion) is not something that should be set aside. There are still a number of pending issues to be resolved, especially for the victims and their families", as well as to "tell the Panamanian version of events, a version told to us by those who were there, not the version from the outside." Pachecho also stated that 15 years before the film, Panamanians did not want to grant interviews regarding the invasion, but more recently had finally become interested in discussing the event.

== See also ==
- List of submissions to the 93rd Academy Awards for Best International Feature Film
- List of Panamanian submissions for the Academy Award for Best International Feature Film
