= Salsipuedes (film) =

2016 film

- Theatrical release poster
- Directed by: Ricardo Aguilar Navarro; Manuel Rodríguez
- Written by: Manuel Rodríguez
- Starring: Elmis Castillo
- Release date: 8 April 2016
- Country: Panama
- Language: Spanish

Salsipuedes is a 2016 Panamanian drama film directed by Ricardo Aguilar Navarro and Manuel Rodríguez. It was selected as the Panamanian entry for the Best Foreign Language Film at the 89th Academy Awards but it was not nominated.

== Cast ==
- Elmis Castillo as Andrés Pimienta
- Maritza Vernaza as Eloísa
- Jaime Newball as Bobby Pimienta
- Lucho Gotti as Esteban Pimienta

== See also ==
- List of submissions to the 89th Academy Awards for Best Foreign Language Film
- List of Panamanian submissions for the Academy Award for Best Foreign Language Film
