= Ruben Blades Is Not My Name =

2018 film

- Film poster
- Directed by: Abner Benaim
- Written by: Abner Benaim
- Starring: Rubén Blades
- Music by: Rubén Blades
- Release dates: 10 March 2018 (SXSW); 30 August 2018 (Panama); 12 September 2018 (Colombia)
- Country: Panama
- Language: Spanish
- Box office: $46,953 (COP 13,657,870)

Ruben Blades Is Not My Name (Spanish: Yo No Me Llamo Rubén Blades) is a 2018 Panamanian documentary film directed by Abner Benaim. The documentary follows the life of Rubén Blades, a Panamanian musician, singer, composer, actor, activist, and politician, and his contributions to the New York "Salsa revolution", a Latin American music movement which has been estimated to have lasted between 1968 and 1985. It was selected as the Panamanian entry for the Best Foreign Language Film at the 91st Academy Awards, but it was not nominated.

== Featuring ==
In addition to Rubén Blades, a number of the key figures of the Latin music scene are featured or interviewed in the documentary, a few of those names being Gilberto Santa Rosa, Paul Simon, Junot Diaz, and Sting. -Among others.

== See also ==
- List of submissions to the 91st Academy Awards for Best Foreign Language Film
- List of Panamanian submissions for the Academy Award for Best Foreign Language Film
