= Tito, Margot & Me =

- Theatrical release poster
- Directed by: Mercedes Arias; Delfina Vidal
- Written by: Mercedes Arias; Delfina Vidal; Joaneska Grössl
- Produced by: Luis Pacheco
- Cinematography: Luis Franco Brantley; Alvis Gonzalez; Alexandra Henao
- Edited by: Juan Quirós; Carlos Revelo; Avilo Montenegro
- Music by: Leonardo Durham
- Production companies: Betesda Films; Jaguar Films
- Release dates: December 4, 2022 (IFF Panama); January 19, 2023 (Panama)
- Running time: 93 minutes
- Countries: Panama; Colombia
- Languages: Spanish; English

Tito, Margot & Me (Spanish: Tito, Margot y yo) is a 2022 Panamanian-Colombian biographical documentary film directed by Mercedes Arias & Delfina Vidal who co-wrote with Joaneska Grössl. The film investigates the love life between Roberto 'Tito' Arias and Margot Fonteyn who lived their love between international entertainment and political conspiracies.

It was selected as the Panamenian entry for the Best International Feature Film at the 96th Academy Awards.

== Synopsis ==
The best dancer in the world in the 20th century, lived a highly questioned marriage with a Panamanian politician. A niece of the couple follows the trail of the last and closest witnesses of that relationship between Roberto 'Tito' Arias and Margot Fonteyn, to discover a love lived in the public eye as members of international entertainment, a love full of gray, conspiracies, acceptance and tragedy.

== Release ==
Tito, Margot & Me had its world premiere on December 4, 2022, at the Panama International Film Festival, and was later commercially released on January 19, 2023, in Panamanian theaters.

== See also ==
- List of Panamanian submissions for the Academy Award for Best International Feature Film
