= Invasion (2014 film) =

2014 documentary film

- Film poster
- Spanish: Invasión
- Directed by: Abner Benaim
- Written by: Abner Benaim
- Release date: 6 April 2014
- Running time: 94 minutes
- Country: Panama
- Language: Spanish

Invasion (Spanish: Invasión) is a 2014 Panamanian documentary film written and directed by Abner Benaim about the 1989 US invasion. It was selected as the Panamanian entry for the Best Foreign Language Film at the 87th Academy Awards, but was not nominated. It was the first time that Panama submitted a film for the Best Foreign Language Oscar.

== Synopsis ==
The film interviews many Panama residents who were affected by the invasion of Panama in 1989. The film also interviewed Manuel Noriega.

== Reception ==
The film won the Best Documentary Audience Award, and the MasterCard Central America and Caribbean Audience Award, at the Panama film festival.

== See also ==
- List of submissions to the 87th Academy Awards for Best Foreign Language Film
- List of Panamanian submissions for the Academy Award for Best Foreign Language Film
