= One Dollar, The Price of Life =

2002 documentary film

One Dollar, The Price of Life (Spanish: One Dollar (el precio de la vida)) is a 2002 documentary film directed by Hector Herrera and Joan Cutrina. The film portrays a stark vision of the reality of life on the streets of Panama, focusing on the city of Colón. The film was shot in the months of September to November 1999, January to August 2000, and January and February 2001.

Filming took place in the slums of Panama and the film features performances from several local reggae artists such as DJ LOLO, Julio Moreno and Kafu Banton.

== Synopsis ==
The film focuses on the life in the poor neighborhoods and ghettos of Panama, featuring scenarios like the post-Operation Just Cause weapon-filled El Chorrillo and the like. The movie focuses on three characters: Dancehall (and now also Reggaeton) artist Latin Fresh; "Fat", a clerk who works collecting corpses on Panama streets; and Lolo, leader of the gang "Krazy Killas".

The name comes from a phrase mentioned by a drugged individual in the film who mentions what translates as: "Visit Panama. For one dollar you will be able to buy a pound of cocaine, a dose of crack and even try the "Pegon" -a mix of cannabis with battery acid, diesel, gasoline and other chemical compounds-".

The documental features known figures of the Reggae en Español & Dancehall scene of Panama like deejays Julio Moreno, Suppouse, Danger Man, Kafu Banton, Arruga and Latin Fresh.
