= Plaza Catedral =

2021 film

- Wide theatrical release poster
- Directed by: Abner Benaim
- Written by: Abner Benaim
- Produced by: Abner Benaim; Rubén Sierra Salles
- Starring: Manolo Cardona
- Cinematography: Lorenzo Hagerman
- Edited by: Soledad Salfate
- Music by: Matthew Herbert
- Release date: 3 October 2021 (GIFF)
- Running time: 94 minutes
- Country: Panama
- Language: Spanish

Plaza Catedral is a 2021 Panamanian drama film written, co-produced and directed by Abner Benaim. It was selected as the Panamanian entry for the Best International Feature Film at the 94th Academy Awards. The film appeared on the Best International Feature Film shortlist in December 2021. Ultimately, it was not nominated.

Young actor Fernando Xavier de Casta received the Mezcal Award for Best Actor from the Guadalajara International Film Festival, but was shot to death in Panama before the film was released internationally.

== Cast ==
- Manolo Cardona as Diego
- Ilse Salas as Alicia
- Fernando Xavier De Casta as Chief

== Accolades ==
Year	Award	Category	Nominee(s)	Result	Ref.
2022	9th Platino Awards	Best Actress	Ilse Salas	Nominated	
2022	9th Platino Awards	Best Screenplay	Abner Benaim	Nominated	
2022	9th Platino Awards	Best Sound	Carlos García	Nominated	

== See also ==
- List of submissions to the 94th Academy Awards for Best International Feature Film
- List of Panamanian submissions for the Academy Award for Best International Feature Film
