= Birthday Boy (2022 film) =

Cumpleañero
- Theatrical release poster
- Directed by: Arturo Montenegro
- Written by: Arturo Montenegro
- Starring: Albi De Abreu
- Cinematography: Aaron Bromley
- Edited by: Antonio Zapata
- Music by: Pablo Borghi
- Production company: Q Films
- Release date: 15 September 2022
- Running time: 88 minutes
- Country: Panama
- Language: Spanish

Birthday Boy (Spanish: Cumpleañero) is a 2022 Panamanian thriller drama film written and directed by Arturo Montenegro. It was selected as the Panamanian entry in the Best International Film at the 95th Academy Awards, but was not nominated.

== Synopsis ==
Jimmy celebrates his 45th birthday at the beach house, inviting his close circle of friends over for a weekend full of fun, excess and compromise. Everything is interrupted by Jimmy's confession of wanting to end his life before the party ends.

== Cast ==
- Albi De Abreu as Jimmy
- Joavany Alvarez as Alex
- Sharo Cerquera as Nicole
- Julia Dorto as Laura
- Gina Faarup Cochez as Detective
- Gaby Gnazzo as Milu

== Production ==
Arturo Montenegro commented that it took 5 weeks to prepare the location, hence 3 months of pre-production, to finally shoot the film within 4 weeks in the Azuero peninsula and various beaches in the coast of Pedasí, to continue with five months of post-production.

== Release ==
Birthday Boy premiered in Panamanian theaters on September 15, 2022. With plans for a premiere in the international market at the hands of Onceloops Media.

== See also ==
- List of submissions to the 95th Academy Awards for Best International Feature Film
- List of Panamanian submissions for the Academy Award for Best International Feature Film
