= Edward José (singer) =

Panamanian singer and songwriter (born 2003)

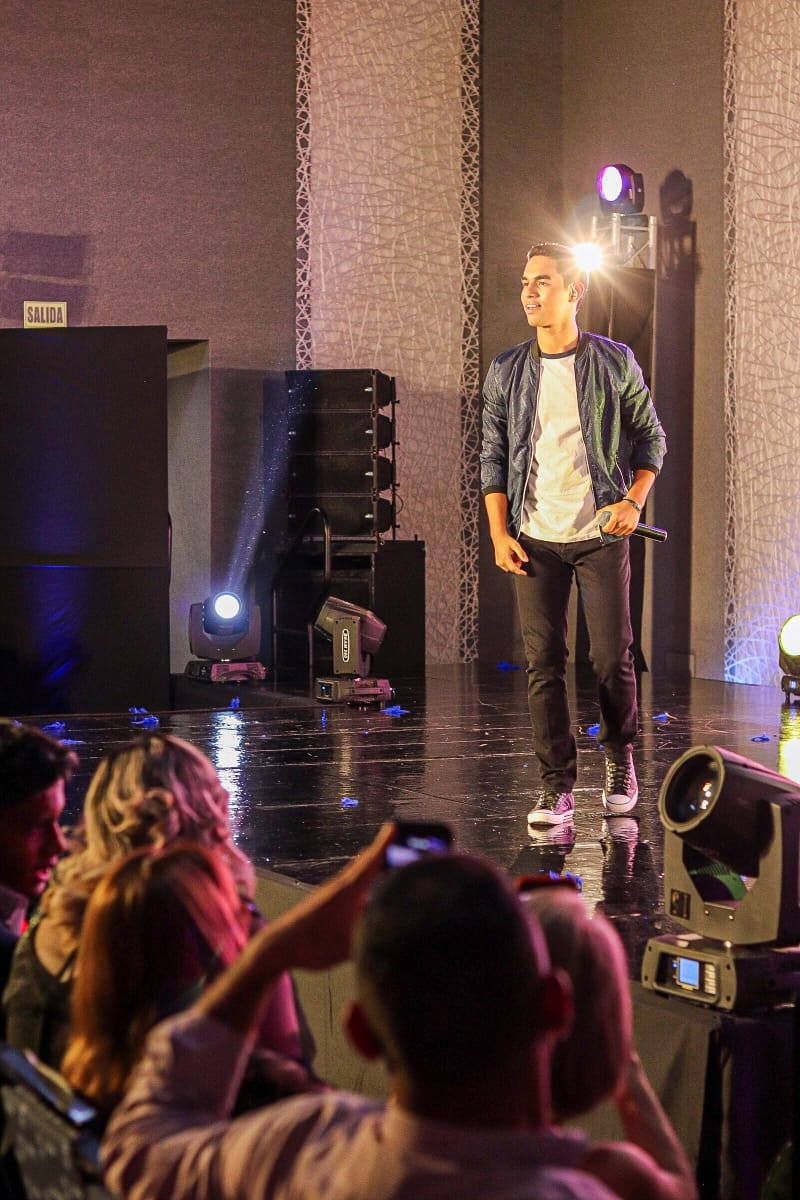
- José on the Miss World Panama 2019 Gala

Background information
- Birth name: José Edward Ramos Urriola
- Born: October 28, 2003 (age 21); Panama City, Panama
- Genres: Pop; Urbano
- Occupations: Singer; songwriter
- Instruments: Vocals; Guitar
- Years active: 2018–present
- Website: edwardjosemusic.com

José Edward Ramos Urriola, best known as Edward José (born October 28, 2003) is a Panamanian singer and songwriter.

== Biography ==
Edward was born in Panama City, Panama in 2003. As a teenager, on 1 June 2018, he released his first single "Me Duele", produced by Kako Nieto. The song was supported by Rafa Moreno, also Panamanian, who became his godfather.

On 30 November of the same year, he released his second single, entitled Bienhadado, synonymous with lucky, a song he wrote for his mother.

In August 2019 was the release of his third studio single, "Ya No Sé", song that he premiered in his presentation as a guest artist at the final gala of Miss World Panama on 20 September of the same year.

In 2020, he ventured into the urban genre, with a collaboration with the Panamanian artist, I Nesta, with his song "Hagámonos Bien", produced by the Honduran Danny Vallarosa.

Since the release of his first single in 2018, Edward has participated as a guest artist in countless programs, social events, schools, and sports; Miss Teen and Miss Teenager galas, to name a few.

He worked as an actor, at the age of ten. In 2014, he acted in the children's play "Peter Pan and the Lost Boys" with the starring role of Peter Pan.

Since 2017, he has participated as a talent in the Panamanian wrestling company, Global Wrestling Evolution.

== Songwriter ==
Edward José sings and composes all his songs with his guitar. At the age of nine, he composed his first song. By the age of sixteen he has composed more than 80 songs.

== Discography ==
=== Singles ===
- 2018: “Me Duele”
- 2018: “Bienhadado"
- 2019: "Ya No Sé”
- 2020: "Hagámonos Bien”
- 2020: "Amor de Lejos”
- 2021: "Guerra de Besos”
- 2022: “On Repeat”
- 2023: “Lugares”
