= Box 25 =

2015 film

- Film poster
- Directed by: Mercedes Arias; Delfina Vidal
- Release date: 12 April 2015 (IFF Panama)
- Running time: 72 minutes
- Country: Panama
- Language: Spanish

Box 25 (Spanish: Caja 25) is a 2015 Panamanian documentary film directed by Mercedes Arias and Delfina Vidal. The film is about letters that were written by the men who built the Panama Canal.

It was originally reported to be the Panamanian entry for the Best Foreign Language Film at the 88th Academy Awards. However, when the final list was announced by the Academy, the film was not included.

== See also ==
- List of submissions to the 88th Academy Awards for Best Foreign Language Film
- List of Panamanian submissions for the Academy Award for Best Foreign Language Film
