= Beyond Brotherhood =

2017 film

- Film poster
- Directed by: Arianne Benedetti
- Written by: Arianne Benedetti
- Starring: Drew Fuller
- Distributed by: Global Genesis Group
- Release date: 18 August 2017
- Running time: 90 minutes
- Countries: Panama; United States; Argentina
- Language: Spanish

Beyond Brotherhood (Spanish: Más que hermanos) is a 2017 drama film directed by Arianne Benedetti. It was selected as the Panamanian entry for the Best Foreign Language Film at the 90th Academy Awards, but it was not nominated.

== Plot ==
Two siblings, Joshua and Mia, are orphaned when their parents are killed in a domestic accident. Before she dies, their mother asks Joshua to promise always to take care of Mia, but the two of them are sent to separate orphanages. They escape, and grow up together on the streets. When they are older, they discover that their parents' insurance company failed to contact them after the accident, and the money they receive enables them to open a restaurant. Mia also wins a scholarship to study psychology and falls in love with her professor, Chris Vianni. This creates tension between her and Joshua. Despite their differences, he steps in to protect her when he sees her being harassed by a man in a bar, and this sets into motion a tragic train of events.

== Cast ==
- Drew Fuller as Chris Vianni
- Eric Roberts as Buelo Chino
- Valerie Domínguez as Mia Bedi
- Robin Duran as Joshua Bedi
- Maria Conchita Alonso as Puchy
- Juana Viale as Mama
- Arianne Benedetti as Mani Rombo

== See also ==
- List of submissions to the 90th Academy Awards for Best Foreign Language Film
- List of Panamanian submissions for the Academy Award for Best Foreign Language Film
