= Everybody Changes =

2019 film

- Theatrical release poster
- Directed by: Arturo Montenegro
- Starring: Leonte Bordanea
- Release date: 15 August 2019
- Running time: 92 minutes
- Country: Panama
- Language: Spanish

Everybody Changes (Spanish: Todos Cambiamos) is a 2019 Panamanian drama film directed by Arturo Montenegro. It was selected as the Panamanian entry for the Best International Feature Film at the 92nd Academy Awards, but it was not nominated.

== Plot ==
A married father of three comes out as a trans woman.

== Cast ==
- Leonte Bordanea
- Gaby Gnazzo
- Marisín Luzcando
- Andrea Pérez Meana

== See also ==
- List of submissions to the 92nd Academy Awards for Best International Feature Film
- List of Panamanian submissions for the Academy Award for Best International Feature Film
