= El espectro de la guerra =

1988 film

- Directed by: Ramiro Lacayo Deshon
- Written by: Ramiro Lacayo Deshon; Franco Reggiani
- Produced by: Julio Torres; Carlos Álvarez
- Starring: Elmer Macfield
- Cinematography: Livio Delgado
- Edited by: Michael Bloecher; Johnny Henderson
- Music by: Randall Watson
- Release date: 1988
- Running time: 124 minutes
- Country: Nicaragua
- Language: Spanish

El espectro de la guerra (English: The Ghost of War or The Spectre of War) is a 1988 Nicaraguan drama film directed by Ramiro Lacayo Deshon. The film, produced with the support of the Nicaraguan government in conjunction with Cuban, Spanish and Mexican backers, depicts the life of a young man who fights the Contras. The film was selected as the Nicaraguan entry for the Best Foreign Language Film at the 61st Academy Awards, but was not accepted as a nominee.

== Synopsis ==
Reynaldo, a young man from Bluefields, dreams of being a professional dancer. However, his ambitions are disrupted when he becomes subject to conscription due to the war against the Contras.

== Cast ==
- Elmer Macfield as Reynaldo
- Alenka Díaz as María
- Manuel Poveda as Miguel
- Pilar Aguirre as Grandmother
- Carlos Aleman Ocampo as Don Teófilo

== Production ==
The film was a co-production with Televisión Española, the Cuban Institute of Cinematographic Art and Industry, and Imevisión. The film cost $300,000 to produce, making it the most expensive Nicaraguan film production until surpassed in 2009 by La Yuma. Filming lasted approximately two months with a Spanish crew of around fifty people.

== Reception ==
The film won an award for Best Screenplay at the 1988 Havana Film Festival. Ángel Fernández-Santos, writing for El País, called the film one of the surprises of the festival, optimistically predicting that it could even achieve international distribution. The film was subsequently shown at international film festivals; Televisión Española purchased broadcast rights for the film to air on Spanish television.

The film premiered domestically on 18 April 1989 in Managua. Film reviews of the time were generally mixed, particularly as the actors were not professionals. The film was criticized by pro-Sandinista publications such as Barricada and the affiliated magazine Ventana for sacrificing patriotic values in the name of popular appeal, while conversely La Prensa criticized the film for allegedly promoting military service.

== See also ==
- List of submissions to the 61st Academy Awards for Best Foreign Language Film
- List of Nicaraguan submissions for the Academy Award for Best Foreign Language Film
