= Abner Benaim =

Panamanian director and film producer

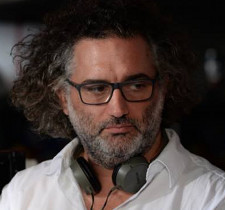
- Born: 1971 (age 53–54); Panama City, Panama
- Occupation(s): Director, producer, screenwriter, plastic artist
- Years active: 2003–present

Abner Benaim (Hebrew: אבנר בן נעים; born 1971) is a Panamanian film director, producer, screenwriter and plastic artist.

== Biography ==
Benaim was born in Panama City in 1971. He studied International Relationships at University of Pennsylvania, United States. He then attended Tel Aviv's Camera Obscura film school. Benaim took his first steps in the documentary world with Good Vibes and Round Trip To Panama, showed at Jerusalem, Tel Aviv, Haifa, Los Angeles, Chicago, New York, Miami and Panama, receiving multiple nominations in several international film festivals.

In 2004 he founded Apertura Films in Panama City. In 2005 he directed an 11-episode documentary series, El otro lado that won the New York Television Festival Best Documentary Award 2005 and was mentioned by Rolling Stone magazine in its Latin American edition as one of the 100 best TV show of all times. Benaim has taken part in several productions, including films as Life in nature (2002), In the attic (2003), On the bench (2014, Short Plays series), Bulldog Noise (2004) and the book Panamix.

In 2009 he released Chance beating records in the Panamanian box office with more than 140,000 domestic tickets sold and half a million viewers in the region. Benaim won the 2011 Japan Skip City D-Cinema Festival Best Screenplay Award and his film was acquired by HBO and Ibermedia TV.

Empleadas y patrones, a documentary he directed in 2010, had its premiere at IDFA and was shown in Hot Docs Toronto, London International Film Festival and more than 40 other international festivals.

In 2014 Benaim released Invasion, a documentary about the collective memory forged around the invasion of Panama by the United States in 1989. The film was premiered in Panama's 2014 IFF International Film Festival and won the Audience Best Picture Award and the Latin American and Caribbean Best Picture of 2014. Invasion was selected to represent Panama in the Best Foreign Picture category (now called Best International Feature Film) at the 87th Academy Awards, but was not nominated. In 2015, Invasion won the Best Director Award at the MIFF, the Best Caribbean Documentary Award at the FIQBAC International Film Festival of Barranquilla, Colombia, and the Audience Award at the Málaga Film Festival.

Benaim took part in the collective film Historias del Canal (2014) directing the segment called 1977.

Benaim's 2018 documentary Ruben Blades Is Not My Name was also submitted, but did not receive a nomination, for the Academy Award for Best International Feature Film at the 91st Academy Awards.

Plaza Catedral made the shortlist for the 94th Academy Awards — becoming the first to do so for Panama, and thus rendering him the only Panamanian director with more than one submission.

== Filmography ==
- Plaza Catedral (2021)
- Historias del Canal, segment 1977 (2014)
- Chance (2009)
- In the attic (2003)

== Documentaries ==
- Ruben Blades Is Not My Name (2018)
- Invasion (2014)
- Empleadas y Patrones (2010)
- Bulldog Noise (2004)
- Good vibes (2003)
- Round Trip to Panama (2002)

== As producer ==
- Invasion (2014)
- Empleadas y Patrones (2010)
- Chance (2009) - Coproduced by Matthias Ehrenberg
- El Otro Lado (2005)
- En el Ático (2003)
- Life in Nature (2002)
