= Morazán (film) =

2017 film

- Film poster
- Directed by: Hispano Durón
- Written by: Hispano Durón
- Starring: Orlando Valenzuela
- Release date: 14 September 2017
- Running time: 90 minutes
- Country: Honduras
- Language: Spanish

Morazán is a 2017 Honduran drama film directed by Hispano Durón. It was selected as the Honduran entry for the Best Foreign Language Film at the 90th Academy Awards, but it was not nominated. It was the first time Honduras had sent a film for consideration for the Best Foreign Language film.

== Plot ==
In 1842 Costa Rica, the allies of General Francisco Morazán betray him.

== Cast ==
- Orlando Valenzuela as Francisco Morazán
- Tito Estrada as Antonio Pinto Soares
- Melissa Merlo as María Josefa Lastiri
- Gabriel Ochoa as José Trinidad Cabañas

== See also ==
- List of submissions to the 90th Academy Awards for Best Foreign Language Film
- List of Honduran submissions for the Academy Award for Best Foreign Language Film
