= Ingrid de Ycaza =

Panamanian actress

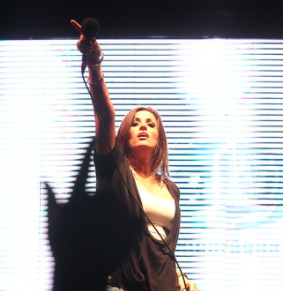
- Born: Ingrid Melissa De Ycaza Garcia De Paredes; 12 February 1980 (age 45); Panama City, Panama
- Occupation: Singer
- Spouse: Jorge Fernández (m. 2012)

Ingrid de Ycaza (born 12 February 1980) is a Panamanian singer. She has been one of the greatest figures of singing in Panama, and had a broad musical career. It has been highlighted by songs such as "Todo me recuerda a ti", "Dime si me quieres" (a duet with Manuel Araúz), "Sueña", among others.

== Biography ==
De Ycaza was born on 12 February 1980, in Panama City, Panama. Since childhood, she discovered her great passion for singing, which prompted her to continue her studies. When she was 12 years old she went to Canada and she let go more, she decided to become a singer there. In Panama, she was part of rock bands and played ballads and soul, but the R&B was her greatest influence.

== Career as a singer ==
De Ycaza had a golden age, in which she recorded various musical themes such as "Todo me recuerda a ti", "Dime si me quieres", el gran éxito "Sueña", "Solo", "Juntos" (with Dindi), "Volverte a ver" (with Myla Vox), "Navidad es" (her own version) and her latest hit, "Bienvenido a mi vida".

After getting pregnant with her first daughter, de Ycaza moved away from music and married her partner Jorge Fernández. De Ycaza lived for a long time in Nicaragua, and on her return to Panama, revealed that she was still producing music from Nicaragua.

== Career as a television presenter ==
A great opportunity for De Ycaza, comes in 2014, when television presenter Franklyn Robinson offers to be one of the presenters of his new program, entitled "Chollywood", where they also worked Amanda Diaz and Iris de Arco. The program aired for a few months on the NexTV network.

After a strong lawsuit between De Ycaza and one of her companions, Iris de Arco, the latter was expelled from the program, and in her replacement came the reporter and also presenter, Jackeline "Jacky" Guzmán.

After this situation, Franklyn and Ingrid had a strong legal problem with the NexTV network. They both decided to quit the channel, try to fight for the name "Chollywood", created by Robinson, but the executives of NexTV denied them the right to use it.

In the pre-sale of the TVN channel of 2015, it is announced that Franklyn, Ingrid, Jacky Guzmán and now as new member Mónica Díaz (later supplanted by Kathy Phillips), were hired by this television station to have their own television program that initiated broadcasts in TVMax, under the name "Suelta el wichi".

The program broadcasts regular broadcasts from Monday to Friday at 9:00 p.m., and every Saturday they broadcast a special program called "Suelta el wichi VIP", where they talk about the most outstanding gossip of the show throughout the week and Segments are included for the entertainment of the public.

The success of the program has allowed him to participate in several programs, including Tu cara me suena in the third season, where she took second place. In 2017, she will be one of the judges in TVN's new children's singing program, Oye mi canto.
