= La Yuma =

2009 film

- Film poster
- Directed by: Florence Jaugey
- Written by: Florence Jaugey; Juan Sobalvarro; Edgar Soberón Torchia
- Produced by: Florence Jaugey
- Starring: Alma Blanco
- Cinematography: Frank Pineda
- Edited by: Mario Sandoval
- Release date: 30 September 2009
- Running time: 90 minutes
- Country: Nicaragua
- Language: Spanish

La Yuma is a 2009 Nicaraguan drama film directed by Florence Jaugey. The film was selected as the Nicaraguan entry for the Best Foreign Language Film at the 83rd Academy Awards, but did not make the final shortlist.

== Plot ==
La Yuma is a girl who lives in a poor Nicaraguan barrio who dreams of being a boxer. She wants to spend her days practicing boxing, but her mother makes her go to a job at a second-hand clothing store with manager Scarlett. Yuma's friend Yader, who was once part of a gang but now owns a gym, tells her that he signed her up to train at an official boxing gym, where she will be able to take part in real matches and possibly make a name for herself.

One day while working at the store, Yuma witnesses her brother steal a backpack from a boy her age, Ernesto. Yuma steals the backpack back from her brother, and upon looking at a picture of Ernesto that was in the backpack, decides to return it to him. As thanks, Ernesto invites her to a bar, and they start dating. The two of them go on dates and talk about the future, and Ernesto watches Yuma practice. However, Ernesto is beaten up by Yuma's brother and ex-boyfriend, and accuses her of being manipulative and tricking him into believing she is good. He breaks up with her.

La Yuma enters her first boxing match and wins. Scarlett, Yader and la Cubana, a transgender woman, all cheer her on. When Yuma gets home, she discovers her mother's boyfriend has been abusing her younger sister, and moves out with her younger siblings to la Cubana's house. Scarlett and Yader help out as well by donating clothing and money; Yader gets her a gig at a circus that is looking for a boxing act. Yuma decides to leave her barrio with her two younger siblings to work at the circus, and finally gets out of the barrio like she wanted to all along.

== Cast ==
- Alma Blanco – La Yuma
- Gabriel Benavides – Ernesto
- Rigoberto Mayorga – Culebra
- María Esther López – Scarlett
- Eliézer Traña – Yader
- Guillermo Martínez – Polvorita
- Juan Carlos García – La Cubana
- Salvador Espinoza – Alfonso
- Sobeyda Téllez – La Yuma's Mother

== See also ==
- List of submissions to the 83rd Academy Awards for Best Foreign Language Film
- List of Nicaraguan submissions for the Academy Award for Best Foreign Language Film
