= Days of Light (film) =

Honduran 2019 drama film

- Film poster
- Spanish: Días de luz
- Directed by: Gloria Carrión Fonseca; Julio López Fernández; Enrique Medrano; Mauro Borges Mora; Enrique Pérez Him; Sergio Ramírez
- Written by: Mauro Borges Mora; Enrique Pérez Him
- Produced by: Grace González; Isabella Gálvez; Karolina Hernández Chavez; Natalia Hernández; Servio Mateo; Francisco Morales; Natalia Hernandez Somoarriba; Ingrid Stalling
- Cinematography: Álvaro Rodríguez Sánchez
- Edited by: César Custodio; Florencia Tissera
- Music by: Rodrigo Denis
- Release date: October 2, 2019 (Latin American Film Festival)
- Running time: 88 minutes
- Countries: Costa Rica; Panama; Honduras; El Salvador; Nicaragua; Guatemala
- Languages: Spanish; K'iche'

Days of Light (Spanish: Días de luz) is a 2019 internationally co-produced anthology thriller drama film directed by six directors: Gloria Carrión Fonseca (Nicaragua), Julio López Fernández (El Salvador), Enrique Medrano (Honduras), Mauro Borges Mora (Costa Rica), Enrique Pérez Him (Panama) and Sergio Ramírez (Guatemala). It was selected as the Honduran entry for the Best International Feature Film at the 93rd Academy Awards, but it was not nominated.

== Synopsis ==
For five days, a solar storm hits Central America. In each of these countries, its inhabitants will have to face life in its most basic terms, finding themselves disconnected from the technological comforts on which we currently depend. Fear, friendship and love explode under the shelter of the reunion with others, while the skies are illuminated by a colorful and never seen before tropical aurora.

In Costa Rica, a overzealous preacher and his daughter use the solar storm as pretense to attract people to their church. In El Salvador, a boy and his grandmother desperately try to reach the city, where his mother is in the hospital. In Guatemala, the victim of a plane crash is helped out by a man and his wife in the countryside. In Honduras, a wife tries to reconnect and rekindle the romance with her husband. In Nicaragua, a girl tries to plan her quinceañera while balancing family, friendship and romance. In Panama, a woman working as a maid in a high rise building has decide if she can leave the building for her family, leaving an old woman behind.

== Cast ==
- María Luisa Garita as Magdalena
- Agustín Acevedo as Gabriel
- Adela Aguero
- Camila Selser as Sofía
- Mauricio Aguilar
- Alondra Altamirano as Yunaite
- Patricio Arenas as Pedro
- Michael Arguedas
- Jurguen Brenes
- Minor Brenes

== Release ==
The film had its world premiere at the "30th AFI Latin American Film Festival" in Washington, D.C., on October 2, 2019.

== See also ==
- List of submissions to the 93rd Academy Awards for Best International Feature Film
- List of Honduran submissions for the Academy Award for Best International Feature Film
