= List of presidents of the Dominican Republic =

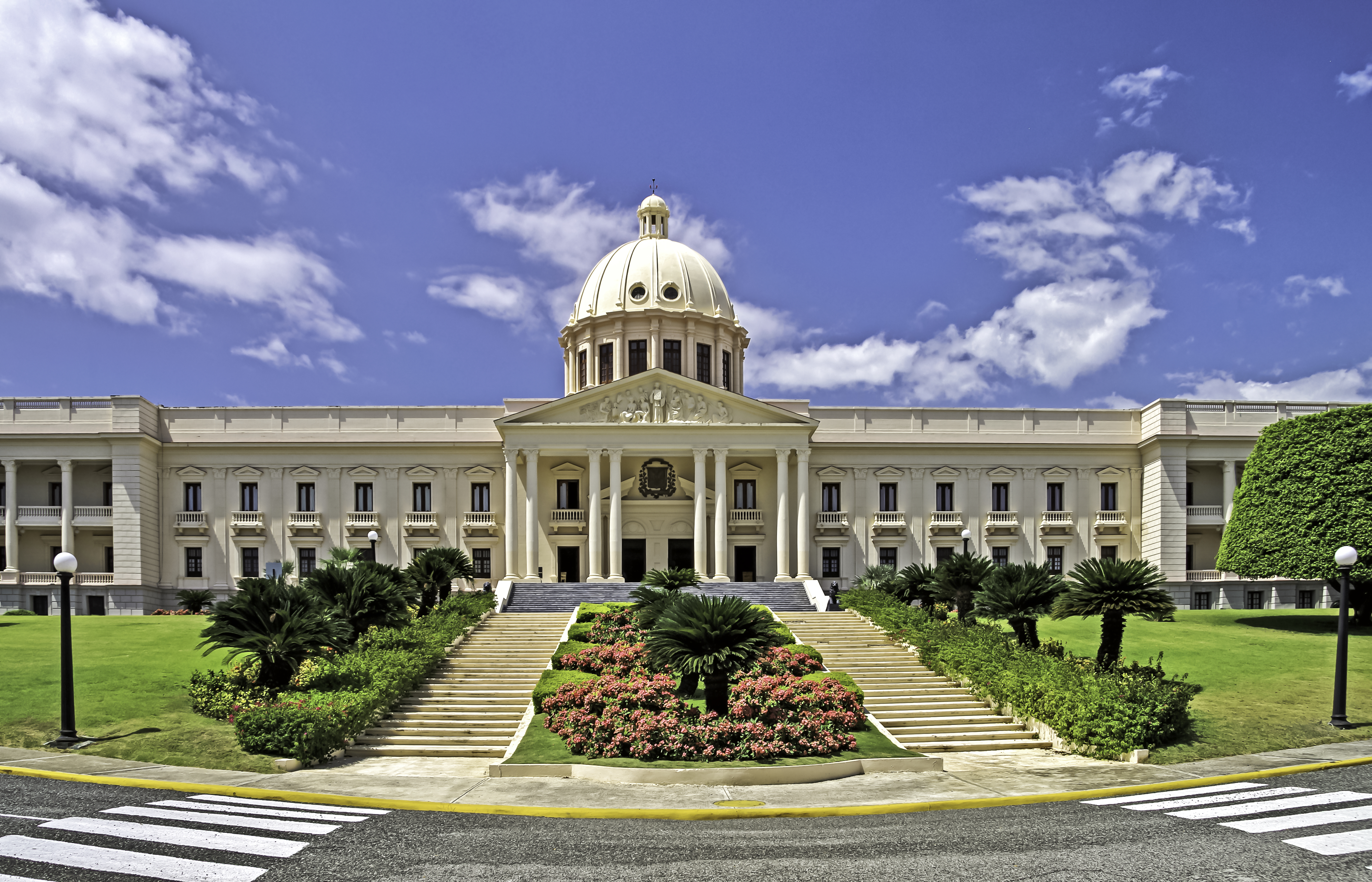
The National Palace is the president's official workplace, the center of the administration, and a prominent symbol of the office.

Since independence in 1844, the Dominican Republic has counted 54 people in the presidential office, whether constitutional, provisional, or interim, divided into 66 periods of government. Likewise, there are also periods in which the head of state role has been exercised by collegiate bodies (such as triumvirates, military juntas, or councils of state).

== First Republic (1844–1861) ==
=== Central Government Junta ===
The Central Government Junta was the first body of a collegiate and provisional nature to exercise the executive, legislative and judicial powers of the nascent Dominican state. It was provisionally constituted on 28 February 1844 and subsequently formalized on 1 March 1844; it went through two coups d'état, and finally dissolved with the proclamation of the first Constitution on 6 November 1844.

Portrait	Name (Birth–Death)	Term of office			Notes
Portrait	Name (Birth–Death)	Took office	Left office	Time in office	Notes
	Francisco del Rosario Sánchez (1817–1861)	28 February 1844	1 March 1844	2 days	Interim president of the Central Government Junta.
	Tomás Bobadilla (1785–1871)	1 March 1844	9 June 1844	100 days	President of the Central Government Junta. Ousted from office by a coup d'état.
	Francisco del Rosario Sánchez (1817–1861)	9 June 1844	12 July 1844	33 days	President of the Central Government Junta. Ousted from office by a coup d'état.
	Pedro Santana (1801–1864)	12 July 1844	14 November 1844	125 days	President of the Central Government Junta.

=== Presidents ===
Portrait	Name (Birth–Death)	Elected	Term of office			Notes
Portrait	Name (Birth–Death)	Elected	Took office	Left office	Time in office	Notes
	Pedro Santana (1801–1864)	1844	14 November 1844	4 August 1848	3 years, 264 days	Resigned.
	Manuel Jimenes (1808–1854)	1848	8 September 1848	29 May 1849	263 days	Ousted from office by a coup d'état.
	Pedro Santana (1801–1864)	—	30 May 1849	23 September 1849	116 days	He held the title "Jefe Supremo" (meaning "Supreme Chief" or "Supreme Boss" in English).
	Santiago Espaillat (1785–185?)	July; 1849	President-elect Espaillat never took office.		—	Espaillat was senator for Santiago when he was elected President by the electoral college, but he did not accept the office as he was afraid that his predecessor (Santana) would undermine his ability to govern. Election results: S. Espaillat, 45 votes; P. Santana, 31 votes; R. B. Báez, 12 votes; José María Medrano, 3 votes; Pedro Ramón de Mena, 2 votes; José de la Concepción Taveras, 2 votes; L. de Velazco, 2 votes...
	Buenaventura Báez (1812–1884)	Aug. 1849	24 September 1849	15 February 1853	3 years, 144 days	
	Pedro Santana (1801–1864)	1853	15 February 1853	26 May 1856	3 years, 101 days	Resigned.
	Manuel de Regla Mota (1795–1864)	—	2 January 1855	5 September 1855	246 days	Vice-president under Pedro Santana. Acting president.
	Manuel de Regla Mota (1795–1864)	—	26 May 1856	8 October 1856	135 days	Vice-president under Pedro Santana, assumed the presidency after his resignation. Resigned.
	Buenaventura Báez (1812–1884)	—	8 October 1856	12 June 1858	1 year, 247 days	Vice-president under Manuel de Regla Mota, assumed the presidency after his resignation. Resigned.
	José Desiderio Valverde (1822–1903)	—	7 July 1857	31 August 1858	1 year, 55 days	Self-appointed president in Santiago de los Caballeros.
	Pedro Santana (1801–1864)	—	13 June 1858	31 January 1859	2 years, 278 days	Approved the annexation of the country to Spain.
	Pedro Santana (1801–1864)	1859	31 January 1859	18 March 1861	2 years, 278 days	Approved the annexation of the country to Spain.

== Spanish annexation (1861–1865) ==
Portrait	Name (Birth–Death)	Term of office			Notes
Portrait	Name (Birth–Death)	Took office	Left office	Time in office	Notes
	Pedro Santana (1801–1864)	18 March 1861	20 July 1862	1 year, 124 days	Captain-General of Santo Domingo. Resigned. Created 1st Marquess of Las Carreras in 1862.
	Felipe Rivero y Lemoine (1797–1873)	20 July 1862	22 October 1863	1 year, 94 days	Captain-General of Santo Domingo.
	Carlos de Vargas y Cerveto (1803–1876)	23 October 1863	30 March 1864	159 days	Captain-General of Santo Domingo.
	José de la Gándara y Navarro (1820–1885)	31 March 1864	11 July 1865	1 year, 102 days	Captain-General of Santo Domingo.

== Dominican Restoration War (1863–1865) ==
Portrait	Name (Birth–Death)	Term of office			Notes
Portrait	Name (Birth–Death)	Took office	Left office	Time in office	Notes
	José Antonio Salcedo (1816–1864)	14 September 1863	10 October 1864	1 year, 26 days	
	Gaspar Polanco (1801–1867)	10 October 1864	24 January 1865	106 days	
	Benigno Filomeno de Rojas (1821–1865)	24 January 1865	24 March 1865	59 days	
	Pedro Antonio Pimentel (1830–1874)	25 March 1865	11 July 1865	108 days	Spain concedes defeat and orders a withdraw from the island.

== Second Republic (1865–1916) ==
Political parties

Blue Party
Red Party
Green Party
Independent

Portrait	Name (Birth–Death)	Elected	Term of office			Political party	Notes
Portrait	Name (Birth–Death)	Elected	Took office	Left office	Time in office	Political party	Notes
	Pedro Antonio Pimentel (1830–1874)	—	11 July 1865	4 August 1865	24 days	—	Ousted from office by a coup d'état.
	José María Cabral (1816–1899)	—	4 August 1865	15 November 1865	103 days	Blue	Cabral was proclaimed "Protector of the Republic" until the election of a new president by the National Convention.
	Pedro Guillermo (1814–1867)	—	15 November 1865	8 December 1865	23 days	—	Guillermo was appointed as Interim President until the arrival to the Dominican Republic of Buenaventura Báez, who was exiled in Curaçao.
	Buenaventura Báez (1812–1884)	1865	8 December 1865	29 May 1866	172 days	Red	Ousted from office by a coup d'état.
	Triumvirate	—	29 May 1866	22 August 1866	85 days	—	Members: Pedro Antonio Pimentel, Gregorio Luperón, Federico de Jesús García. The Electoral College system was abolished and replaced by universal direct suffrage.
	José María Cabral (1816–1899)	—	22 August 1866	29 September 1866	1 year, 162 days	Blue	Interim president.
	José María Cabral (1816–1899)	1866	29 September 1866	31 January 1868	1 year, 162 days	Blue	Cabral was the first Dominican president elected by universal direct suffrage. Ousted from office by a coup d'état.
	Manuel Altagracia Cáceres (1838–1878)	—	31 January 1868	13 February 1868	13 days	—	
	Junta of Generals	—	13 February 1868	2 May 1868	79 days	—	Members: José Antonio Hungría, Francisco Antonio Gómez Báez, José Ramón Luciano y Franco.
	Buenaventura Báez (1812–1884)	1868	2 May 1868	2 January 1874	5 years, 245 days	Red	Ousted from office by defeat in the Six Years' War.
	Ignacio María González (1838–1915)	—	25 November 1873	21 January 1874	57 days	Green	Supreme chief.
	Ignacio María González (1838–1915) Manuel Altagracia Cáceres (1838–1878)	—	21 January 1874	5 February 1874	15 days	—	Generals in charge of the Supreme Power of the Nation.
	Ignacio María González (1838–1915)	1874	5 February 1874	23 February 1876	2 years, 18 days	Green	Resigned.
	Council of Secretaries of State	—	23 February 1876	29 April 1876	66 days	—	Members: Pedro Tomás Garrido Matos, José de Jesús Eduardo de Castro Álvarez, Pedro Pablo de Bonilla y Correa-Cruzado, Juan Bautista Zafra y Miranda, Pablo López Villanueva (until 7 March 1876), Jacinto Peynado y Tejón (since 7 March 1876).
	Ulises Francisco Espaillat (1823–1878)	1876	29 April 1876	5 October 1876	159 days	Blue	Ousted from office by a coup d'état.
	Superior Governing Junta	—	5 October 1876	11 November 1876	37 days	—	Members: Pedro Tomás Garrido Matos, José de Jesús Eduardo de Castro Álvarez, Juan Bautista Zafra y Miranda, Pablo López Villanueva, José Caminero Matías, Fidel Rodríguez Urdaneta, Juan Esteban Ariza Matos.
	Ignacio María González (1838–1915)	—	11 November 1876	9 December 1876	28 days	Green	Resigned.
	Marcos Antonio Cabral (1842–1903)	—	10 December 1876	26 December 1876	16 days	—	President of the Provisional Government Junta.
	Buenaventura Báez (1812–1884)	—	27 December 1876	2 March 1878	1 year, 65 days	Red	Ousted from office by a coup d'état.
	Ignacio María González (1838–1915)	—	1 March 1878	3 May 1878	63 days	Green	President of the Provisional Government of the National Movement.
	Council of Secretaries of State	—	2 March 1878	5 March 1878	3 days	—	Members: José María Cabral, Joaquín Montolío.
	Cesáreo Guillermo (1847–1885)	—	5 March 1878	6 July 1878	123 days	Red	Interim president.
	Ignacio María González (1838–1915)	1878	6 July 1878	2 September 1878	58 days	Green	Ousted from office by a coup d'état.
	Superior Leaders of the Revolutionary Movement	—	2 September 1878	6 September 1878	4 days	—	Members: Ulises Heureaux, Cesáreo Guillermo.
	Jacinto de Castro (1811–1896)	—	7 September 1878	29 September 1878	22 days	—	President of the Supreme Court of Justice. Resigned.
	Council of Secretaries of State	—	30 September 1878	27 February 1879	150 days	—	Members: Cesáreo Guillermo, Alejandro Angulo Guridi, Pedro María Aristy.
	Cesáreo Guillermo (1847–1885)	1879	27 February 1879	6 December 1879	282 days	Red	Ousted from office by a coup d'état.
	Gregorio Luperón (1839–1897)	—	6 October 1879	1 September 1880	331 days	Blue	
	Fernando Arturo de Meriño (1833–1906)	1880	1 September 1880	1 September 1882	2 years	Blue	
	Ulises Heureaux (1845–1899)	1882	1 September 1882	1 September 1884	2 years	Blue	
	Francisco Gregorio Billini (1844–1898)	1884	1 September 1884	16 May 1885	257 days	Blue	Resigned.
	Alejandro Woss y Gil (1856–1932)	—	16 May 1885	6 January 1887	1 year, 235 days	Blue	Vice-president under Francisco Gregorio Billini, assumed the presidency after his resignation.
	Ulises Heureaux (1845–1899)	1886	6 January 1887	27 February 1889	12 years, 201 days	Blue	
	Ulises Heureaux (1845–1899)	1888	27 February 1889	27 February 1893	12 years, 201 days	Blue	
	Ulises Heureaux (1845–1899)	1892	27 February 1893	27 February 1897	12 years, 201 days	Blue	
	Ulises Heureaux (1845–1899)	1896	27 February 1897	26 July 1899	12 years, 201 days	Blue	Assassinated.
	Wenceslao Figuereo (1834–1910)	—	26 July 1899	30 August 1899	35 days	Blue	Vice-president under Ulises Heureaux, assumed the presidency after his assassination. Ousted from office by a coup d'état.
	Council of Secretaries of State	—	31 August 1899		0 days	—	Members: Tomás Demetrio Morales, Arístides Patiño, Enrique Henríquez y Alfau, Jaime R. Vidal, Braulio Álvarez.
	People's Revolutionary Governing Junta	—	31 August 1899	4 September 1899	4 days	—	Members: Mariano Cestero, Álvaro Logroño, Arístides Patiño, Pedro María Mejía.
	Horacio Vásquez (1860–1936)	—	4 September 1899	15 November 1899	72 days	Red	Interim president.
	Juan Isidro Jimenes Pereyra (1846–1919)	1899	15 November 1899	2 May 1902	2 years, 168 days	Blue	Ousted from office by a coup d'état.
	Horacio Vásquez (1860–1936)	—	26 April 1902	23 April 1903	362 days	Red	Ousted from office by a coup d'état.
	Alejandro Woss y Gil (1856–1932)	—	23 March 1903	1 August 1903	246 days	Blue	Interim president.
	Alejandro Woss y Gil (1856–1932)	1903	1 August 1903	24 November 1903	246 days	Blue	Ousted from office by a coup d'état.
	Carlos Felipe Morales (1868–1914)	—	24 November 1903	17 June 1904	2 years, 30 days	Red	Interim president.
	Carlos Felipe Morales (1868–1914)	1904	17 June 1904	24 December 1905	2 years, 30 days	Red	Resigned.
	Council of Secretaries of State	—	24 December 1905	29 December 1905	5 days	—	Members: Manuel Lamarche García, Emiliano Tejera, Andrés Julio Montolío, Francisco Leonte Vásquez Lajara, Carlos Ginebra, Eladio Victoria, Federico Velásquez y Hernández.
	Ramón Cáceres (1866–1911)	—	29 December 1905	1 July 1908	5 years, 325 days	Red	Vice-president under Carlos Felipe Morales, assumed the presidency after his resignation.
	Ramón Cáceres (1866–1911)	1908	1 July 1908	19 November 1911	5 years, 325 days	Red	Assassinated at the start of the 1911–1912 Civil War.
	Council of Secretaries of State	—	19 November 1911	5 December 1911	16 days	—	Members: Miguel Antonio Román, José María Cabral.
	Eladio Victoria (1864–1939)	—	5 December 1911	27 February 1912	361 days	—	Interim president appointed by the Congress.
	Eladio Victoria (1864–1939)	1912	27 February 1912	30 November 1912	361 days	—	Resigned at the end of the 1911–1912 Civil War.
	Adolfo Alejandro Nouel (1862–1937)	—	30 November 1912	13 April 1913	134 days	—	Archbishop of Santo Domingo, interim president appointed by the Congress. Resigned.
	José Bordas Valdez (1874–1968)	—	14 April 1913	15 June 1914	1 year, 135 days	—	Interim president appointed by the Congress.
	José Bordas Valdez (1874–1968)	June; 1914	15 June 1914	27 August 1914	1 year, 135 days	—	Resigned at the end of the 1914 Civil War.
	Ramón Báez (1858–1929)	—	28 August 1914	5 December 1914	99 days	—	Interim president.
	Juan Isidro Jimenes Pereyra (1846–1919)	Oct. 1914	5 December 1914	4 May 1916	1 year, 151 days	Blue	

== United States occupation (1916–1924) ==
Political parties

Blue Party
Independent

Portrait	Name (Birth–Death)	Term of office			Political party	Notes
Portrait	Name (Birth–Death)	Took office	Left office	Time in office	Political party	Notes
	Juan Isidro Jimenes Pereyra (1846–1919)	4 May 1916	7 May 1916	3 days	Blue	Resigned due to the United States occupation.
	Council of Secretaries of State	7 May 1916	31 July 1916	85 days	—	Members: Jaime Mota, Bernardo Pichardo, Federico Velásquez y Hernández.
	Francisco Henríquez y Carvajal (1859–1935)	31 July 1916	26 November 1916	118 days	—	Interim president appointed by the Congress. Removed by the United States.
Vacant (26 November 1916 – 21 October 1922)
	Juan Bautista Vicini Burgos (1871–1935)	21 October 1922	12 July 1924	1 year, 265 days	—	Interim president.

== Third Republic (1924–1965) ==
Political parties

Red Party (Red)
Republican Party (Republican)
Dominican Party (PD)
Rafael Trujillo and his puppet presidents
Independent
Military
Dominican Revolutionary Party (PRD)

Portrait	Name (Birth–Death)	Elected	Term of office			Political party	Notes
Portrait	Name (Birth–Death)	Elected	Took office	Left office	Time in office	Political party	Notes
	Horacio Vásquez (1860–1936)	1924	12 July 1924	3 March 1930	5 years, 234 days	Red	Ousted from office by a coup d'état.
	Rafael Estrella Ureña (1889–1945)	—	3 March 1930	22 April 1930	50 days	Republican	Minister of Interior and Police under Horacio Vásquez, assumed the presidency after coup d'état. Puppet president of Rafael Trujillo.
	Jacinto Peynado (1878–1940)	—	22 April 1930	21 May 1930	29 days	Republican	Served as interim president interrupting Rafael Estrella Ureña's term. Puppet president of Rafael Trujillo.
	Rafael Estrella Ureña (1889–1945)	—	21 May 1930	16 August 1930	87 days	Republican	Restored as interim president. Puppet president of Rafael Trujillo.
	Rafael Trujillo (1891–1961)	1930	16 August 1930	16 August 1934	8 years	Confederation of Parties	
	Rafael Trujillo (1891–1961)	1934	16 August 1934	16 August 1938	8 years	PD	
	Jacinto Peynado (1878–1940)	1938	16 August 1938	7 March 1940	1 year, 204 days	PD	Died in office. Puppet president of Rafael Trujillo.
	Manuel de Jesús Troncoso (1878–1955)	—	7 March 1940	18 May 1942	2 years, 72 days	PD	Vice-president under Jacinto Peynado, assumed the presidency after his death. Puppet president of Rafael Trujillo.
	Rafael Trujillo (1891–1961)	1942	18 May 1942	16 August 1947	10 years, 90 days	PD	Finished the presidential term of Jacinto Peynado ending on 16 August 1942.
	Rafael Trujillo (1891–1961)	1947	16 August 1947	16 August 1952	10 years, 90 days	PD	
	Héctor Trujillo (1908–2002)	—	1 March 1951	1 October 1951	9 years, 155 days	PD	Acting president.
	Héctor Trujillo (1908–2002)	1952	16 August 1952	16 August 1957	9 years, 155 days	PD	Puppet president of Rafael Trujillo.
	Héctor Trujillo (1908–2002)	1957	16 August 1957	3 August 1960	9 years, 155 days	PD	Resigned. Puppet president of Rafael Trujillo.
	Joaquín Balaguer (1906–2002)	—	3 August 1960	31 December 1961	1 year, 150 days	PD	Vice-president under Héctor Trujillo, assumed the presidency after his resignation. Puppet president of Rafael Trujillo until the assassination of Trujillo on 30 May 1961. Resigned.
	Council of State under President Joaquín Balaguer	—	1 January 1962	16 January 1962	15 days	—	Members: Joaquín Balaguer (President), Rafael Filiberto Bonnelly (Vice-president), Eduardo Read Barreras (Second Vice-president), Eliseo Pérez Sánchez, Nicolás Pichardo, Luis Amiama Tió, Antonio Imbert Barrera. Ousted from office by a coup d'état.
	Civic-Military Junta under President Huberto Bogaert	—	16 January 1962	18 January 1962	2 days	Military	Members: Huberto Bogaert (President), Armando Óscar Pacheco, Luis Amiama Tió, Antonio Imbert Barrera, Enrique Valdez Vidaurre, Wilfredo Medina Natalio, Neit Rafael Nivar Seijas.
	Council of State under President Rafael Filiberto Bonnelly	—	18 January 1962	27 February 1963	1 year, 40 days	—	Members: Rafael Filiberto Bonnelly (President), Eduardo Read Barreras, Eliseo Pérez Sánchez, Nicolás Pichardo, Luis Amiama Tió, Antonio Imbert Barrera, Donald Reid Cabral.
	Juan Bosch (1909–2001)	1962	27 February 1963	25 September 1963	210 days	PRD	Ousted from office by a coup d'état.
	Víctor Elby Viñas Román (1925–2004)	—	25 September 1963	26 September 1963	1 day	Military	President of the Provisional Government Junta.
	Triumvirate under President Emilio de los Santos	—	26 September 1963	23 December 1963	88 days	Military	Members: Emilio de los Santos (President), Manuel Enrique Tavares Espaillat, Ramón Tapia Espinal.
	Triumvirate under President Donald Reid Cabral	—	23 December 1963	25 April 1965	1 year, 123 days	Military	Members: Donald Reid Cabral (President), Ramón Tapia Espinal (resigned on 8 April 1964), Ramón Cáceres Troncoso (since 8 April 1964), Manuel Enrique Tavares Espaillat (resigned on 27 June 1964). Deposed during the Dominican Civil War.

== Dominican Civil War (1965) ==
Portrait	Name (Birth–Death)	Term of office			Faction	Notes
Portrait	Name (Birth–Death)	Took office	Left office	Time in office	Faction	Notes
	Revolutionary Committee	25 April 1965		0 days	—	Members: Vinicio Fernández Pérez, Giovanni Gutiérrez Ramírez, Francisco Caamaño, Eladio Ramírez Sánchez, Pedro Bartolomé Benoit.
	José Rafael Molina Ureña (1921–2000)	25 April 1965	27 April 1965	2 days	Constitutionalist (Pro-Juan Bosch)	Resigned.
Vacant (27 April 1965 – 4 May 1965)					Constitutionalist (Pro-Juan Bosch)	Resigned.
	Francisco Caamaño (1932–1973)	4 May 1965	3 September 1965	122 days	Constitutionalist (Pro-Juan Bosch)	President appointed by the Congress. Resigned.
Vacant (25 April 1965 – 1 May 1965)					Loyalist (Government)	Members: Pedro Bartolomé Benoit (President), Olgo Santana Carrasco, Enrique Apolinar Casado Saladín. Resigned.
	Military Junta	1 May 1965	7 May 1965	6 days	Loyalist (Government)	Members: Pedro Bartolomé Benoit (President), Olgo Santana Carrasco, Enrique Apolinar Casado Saladín. Resigned.
	Government of National Reconstruction	7 May 1965	30 August 1965	115 days	Loyalist (Government)	Members: Antonio Imbert Barrera (President), Carlos Grisolía Poloney, Alejandro Zeller Cocco, Pedro Bartolomé Benoit, Julio Desiderio Postigo Arias (resigned on 10 August 1965), Leonte Bernard Vásquez (since 10 August 1965). Resigned.
Vacant (30 August 1965 – 3 September 1965)
	Héctor García-Godoy (1921–1970)	3 September 1965	1 July 1966	301 days	Transitional Government	Interim President.

== Fourth Republic (1966–present) ==
Political parties

Social Christian Reformist Party (PRSC)
Dominican Revolutionary Party (PRD)
Dominican Liberation Party (PLD)
Modern Revolutionary Party (PRM)

Portrait	Name (Birth–Death)	Elected	Term of office			Political party	Notes
Portrait	Name (Birth–Death)	Elected	Took office	Left office	Time in office	Political party	Notes
	Joaquín Balaguer (1906–2002)	1966	1 July 1966	16 August 1970	12 years, 46 days	PRSC	
	Joaquín Balaguer (1906–2002)	1970	16 August 1970	16 August 1974	12 years, 46 days	PRSC	
	Joaquín Balaguer (1906–2002)	1974	16 August 1974	16 August 1978	12 years, 46 days	PRSC	
	Antonio Guzmán Fernández (1911–1982)	1978	16 August 1978	4 July 1982	3 years, 322 days	PRD	Committed suicide.
	Jacobo Majluta Azar (1934–1996)	—	4 July 1982	16 August 1982	43 days	PRD	Vice-president under Antonio Guzmán, assumed the presidency to finish his term.
	Salvador Jorge Blanco (1926–2010)	1982	16 August 1982	16 August 1986	4 years	PRD	
	Joaquín Balaguer (1906–2002)	1986	16 August 1986	16 August 1990	10 years	PRSC	After fraud charges in the elections of 1994, an agreement known as the Pact for Democracy (Pacto por la Democracia) was reached, which limited consecutive presidential terms to two terms.
	Joaquín Balaguer (1906–2002)	1990	16 August 1990	16 August 1994	10 years	PRSC	After fraud charges in the elections of 1994, an agreement known as the Pact for Democracy (Pacto por la Democracia) was reached, which limited consecutive presidential terms to two terms.
	Joaquín Balaguer (1906–2002)	1994	16 August 1994	16 August 1996	10 years	PRSC	After fraud charges in the elections of 1994, an agreement known as the Pact for Democracy (Pacto por la Democracia) was reached, which limited consecutive presidential terms to two terms.
	Leonel Fernández (born 1953)	1996	16 August 1996	16 August 2000	4 years	PLD	
	Hipólito Mejía (born 1941)	2000	16 August 2000	16 August 2004	4 years	PRD	
	Leonel Fernández (born 1953)	2004	16 August 2004	16 August 2008	8 years	PLD	
	Leonel Fernández (born 1953)	2008	16 August 2008	16 August 2012	8 years	PLD	
	Danilo Medina (born 1951)	2012	16 August 2012	16 August 2016	8 years	PLD	
	Danilo Medina (born 1951)	2016	16 August 2016	16 August 2020	8 years	PLD	
	Luis Abinader (born 1967)	2020	16 August 2020	16 August 2024	6 years, 73 days	PRM	
	Luis Abinader (born 1967)	2024	16 August 2024	Incumbent	6 years, 73 days	PRM	

== See also ==
- History of the Dominican Republic
- Captaincy General of Santo Domingo
  - List of colonial governors of Santo Domingo
- Politics of the Dominican Republic
- President of the Dominican Republic
- Vice President of the Dominican Republic
