= 1957 Dominican Republic general election =

- 16 May 1957
- Presidential election
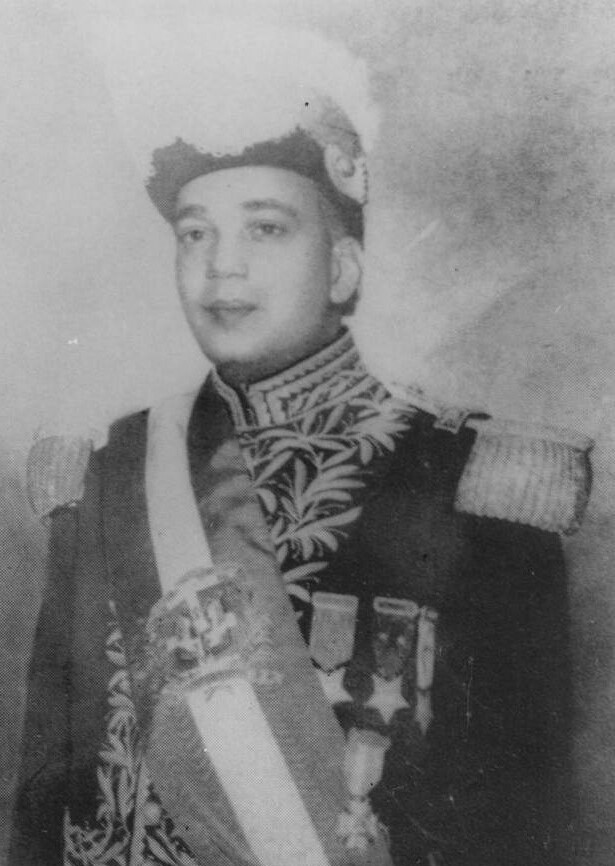
Nominee	Héctor Trujillo
Party	Dominican Party
Popular vote	1,265,681
Percentage	100%
President before election
Héctor Trujillo
Dominican Party
Elected President
Héctor Trujillo
Dominican Party

General elections were held in the Dominican Republic on 16 May 1957. Incumbent Héctor Trujillo was the only candidate in the presidential election, and was unopposed for a second term. However, his predecessor and brother Rafael Trujillo, the country's de facto leader since 1930, maintained absolute control of the country. The Dominican Party won every seat in the Congressional elections. Notably, the previous foreign minister and diplomat Joaquin Balaguer was chosen as Vice President, which would usher in his near-quarter of a century in the presidency (longer than Trujillo himself).

These would be the last elections held under Trujillo's three-decade rule. In 1960 Héctor Trujillo stood down in favor of Vice President Balaguer. Rafael Trujillo was assassinated a year later in 1961. His son, Ramfis, seized power, but only survived for five months before being forced out in November by Balaguer, clearing the way for the country's first free elections in 1962.

== Results ==
Party	Candidate	Votes	%	Seats			
Party	Candidate	Votes	%	House	+/–	Senate	+/–
Dominican Party	Héctor Trujillo	1,265,681	100.00	58	+8	23	+1
Total		1,265,681	100.00	58	+8	23	+1
Source: Nohlen
