= Aída Mercedes Batlle =

First Lady of the Dominican Republic
- In office January 18, 1962 – February 27, 1963
- President: Rafael Filiberto Bonnelly
- Preceded by: Alma McLaughlin Simó
- Succeeded by: Carmen Quidiello

Personal details
- Born: Aída Mercedes Batlle Morell; July 28, 1909 Santiago de los Caballeros, Dominican Republic
- Died: January 28, 2011 (aged 101) Santo Domingo, Dominican Republic
- Spouse: Rafael Filiberto Bonnelly (m. 1930; died 1979)
- Children: 4
- Relatives: Ulises Francisco Espaillat (great-grandfather); Francisco Espaillat (ancestor)

Aída Mercedes Batlle Morell de Bonnelly (née Batlle Morell; July 28, 1909 – January 28, 2011) was a Dominican public figure who served as the First Lady of the Dominican Republic from January 18, 1962, to February 27, 1963, during the presidency of her husband, Rafael Filiberto Bonnelly.

She was born in Santiago de los Caballeros, Dominican Republic, and was the great-granddaughter of former president Ulises Francisco Espaillat.

== Biography ==
Aída Mercedes Batlle Morell was born on July 28, 1909, in Santiago de los Caballeros, Dominican Republic. She was raised in a strict Catholic household. Her parents, Juan Francisco Batlle Espaillat and Amelia Dolores Morell Espaillat—who were second cousins—were married on June 23, 1906, and had eight children, including Aída: Juan José, Daisy, Roberto, Tomás, Óscar, Víctor, and Cosme.

Batlle earned her bachelor's degree from the Normal School of Santiago, where her professors included Sergio Hernández, Joaquín Balaguer, and Rafael Filiberto Bonnelly. In 1930, she married her former professor, Rafael Filiberto Bonnelly. The couple had four children: Luisa Amelia, Rafael Francisco, Juan Sully, and Aída Mercedes.

During the 1930s and early 1940s, her husband actively opposed the Rafael Trujillo dictatorship, which led to political persecution and financial hardship for the family. To support the household, Aída Mercedes Batlle started a homemade ice cream business named “BB,” which became a local success.

In 1944, the family relocated to Santo Domingo, where Bonnelly’s public service career gained momentum. Over the next two decades, he held various prominent roles, including government minister, dean of the University of Santo Domingo, and ambassador to Spain and Venezuela. In 1960, he briefly served as Vice President of the Dominican Republic under President Joaquín Balaguer, following the assassination of Trujillo.

In 1962, Bonnelly was appointed President of the Dominican Republic and head of the Council of State. He is credited with organizing the country’s first democratic elections after Trujillo’s 30-year rule. As a result, Aída Mercedes Batlle served as First Lady of the Dominican Republic from January 1962 to February 1963.

Although First Ladies of that era were not as publicly prominent as today, Batlle led several important social initiatives during her tenure. Her work focused primarily on social welfare and poverty alleviation.

She founded the Patronato de la Maternidad de Nuestra Señora de la Altagracia (Maternity Board of Our Lady of Altagracia), an organization supporting pregnant women and young children. She also established the Hogar Escuela Mercedes Amiama, a school for vulnerable youth. Additionally, she collaborated with other women to expand social services in Las Cañitas, a historically underserved neighborhood in Santo Domingo.

Her husband, Rafael Filiberto Bonnelly, died in December 1979, leaving Batlle a widow.

Aída Mercedes Batlle died at her home at 1:10 a.m. on January 28, 2011, at the age of 101. She was survived by her four children, fifteen grandchildren, thirty-six great-grandchildren, and one great-great-grandson. A funeral viewing was held later that day at the La Paz Chapel of the Blandino Funeral Home on Abraham Lincoln Avenue in Santo Domingo. She was buried on January 29, 2011 at the Christ the Redeemer Cemetery (Cementerio Cristo Redentor) in Santo Domingo.
