= 1947 Dominican Republic general election =

Election in the Dominican Republic

- 16 May 1947
- Presidential election
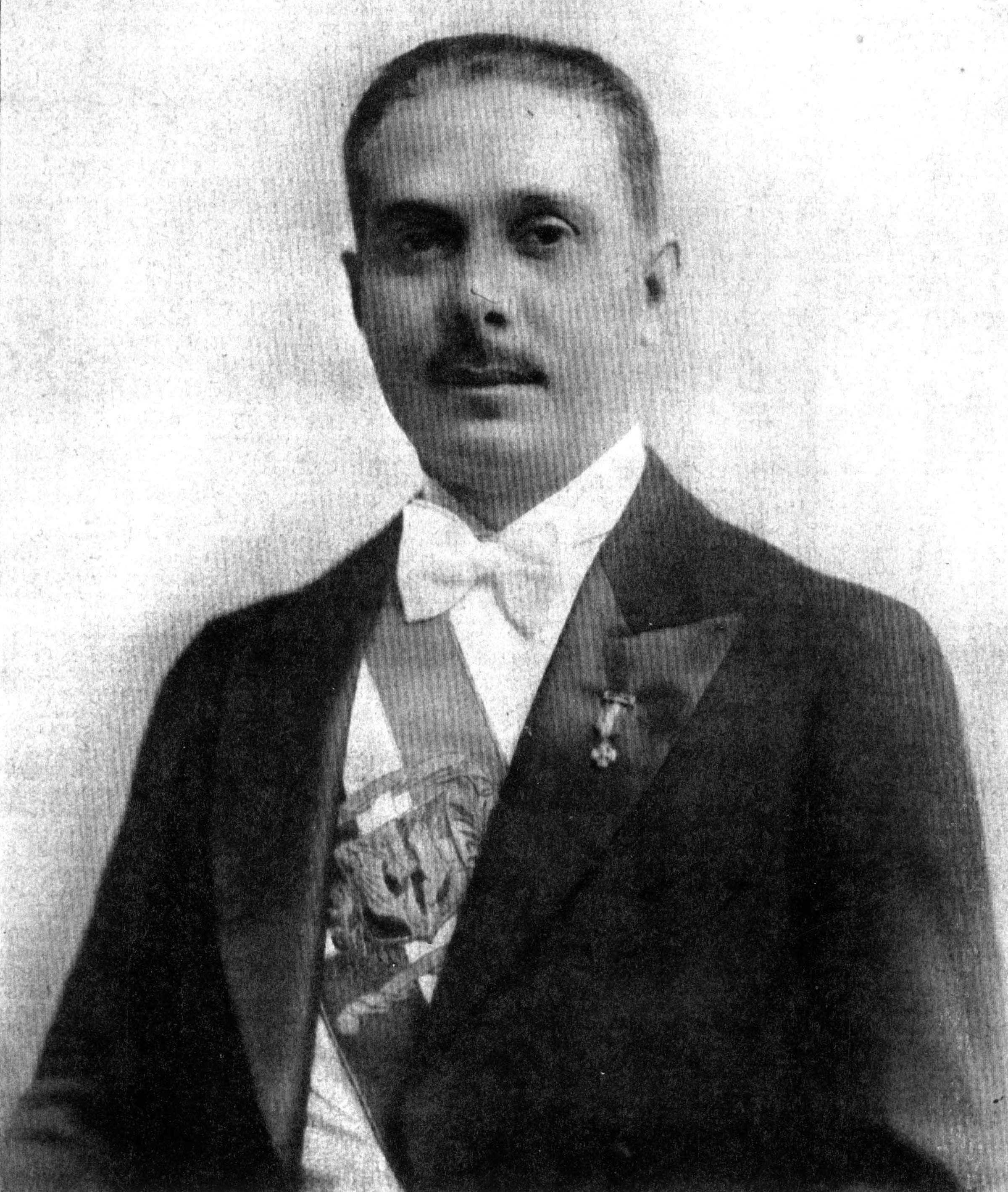
Nominee	Rafael Trujillo
Party	Dominican Party
Popular vote	781,389
Percentage	92.98%
President before election
Rafael Trujillo
Dominican Party
Elected President
Rafael Trujillo
Dominican Party

General elections were held in the Dominican Republic on 16 May 1947. For the first time since the 1924 elections, and the only time during the three-decade rule of Rafael Trujillo, there was still more than one presidential candidate by election day. However, incumbent president Trujillo was re-elected after receiving 93% of the vote. His Dominican Party won every seat in the Congressional elections, as it had at every election since its founding.

The 93% vote share was the lowest that a pro-Trujillo party or alliance would claim during Trujillo's rule. In every other election, the Dominican Party or its predecessor (the Confederation of Parties) claimed to have received 99 percent or more of the vote.

== Results ==
Party	Candidate	Votes	%	Seats			
Party	Candidate	Votes	%	House	+/–	Senate	+/–
Dominican Party	Rafael Trujillo	781,389	92.98	45	+10	19	+3
Democratic National Party	Rafael Espaillat	29,765	3.54	0	New	0	New
National Labour Party	Francisco Prats Ramírez	29,186	3.47	0	New	0	New
Total		840,340	100.00	45	+10	19	+3
Source: Nohlen
