= Red Party (Dominican Republic) =

Red Party Partido Rojo
- Historic leaders: Buenaventura Báez (first); Ramón Cáceres (last)
- Founded: 1865
- Banned: 1930
- Headquarters: Santo Domingo
- Ideology: Paternalistic conservatism Populism; Reactionarism
- Political position: Centre-right to right-wing
- Religion: Roman Catholicism
- Colors: Red

Election symbol

The Red Party (Spanish: Partido Rojo), also known as the Party of the Regeneration (Spanish: Partido de la Regeneración) and nicknamed together the Tailed Ones (Spanish: Los Coludos), was a historical Dominican political party from the late 19th century to the mid-20th century founded by Buenaventura Báez. Ramón Cáceres and Horacio Vásquez were the main leaders of this party in the 20th century, and as such, during this time the followers of this party were also known as Horacistas.

The symbol of this party, and where its name came from, was a rooster with its tail, where the rivals' symbol Los Bolos was tailless. The Red Party was banned in 1930 after Rafael Trujillo's coup. Founded as a party supporting poor peasants and the low-income masses in urban areas, it was generally more popular amongst citizens than Los Bolos, which tended to be more associated with intellectuals. Its ideological heir is the Social Christian Reformist Party.

== See also ==
- Political parties in the Dominican Republic
- History of the Dominican Republic
