= 1952 Dominican Republic general election =

Election in the Dominican Republic

- 16 May 1952
- Presidential election
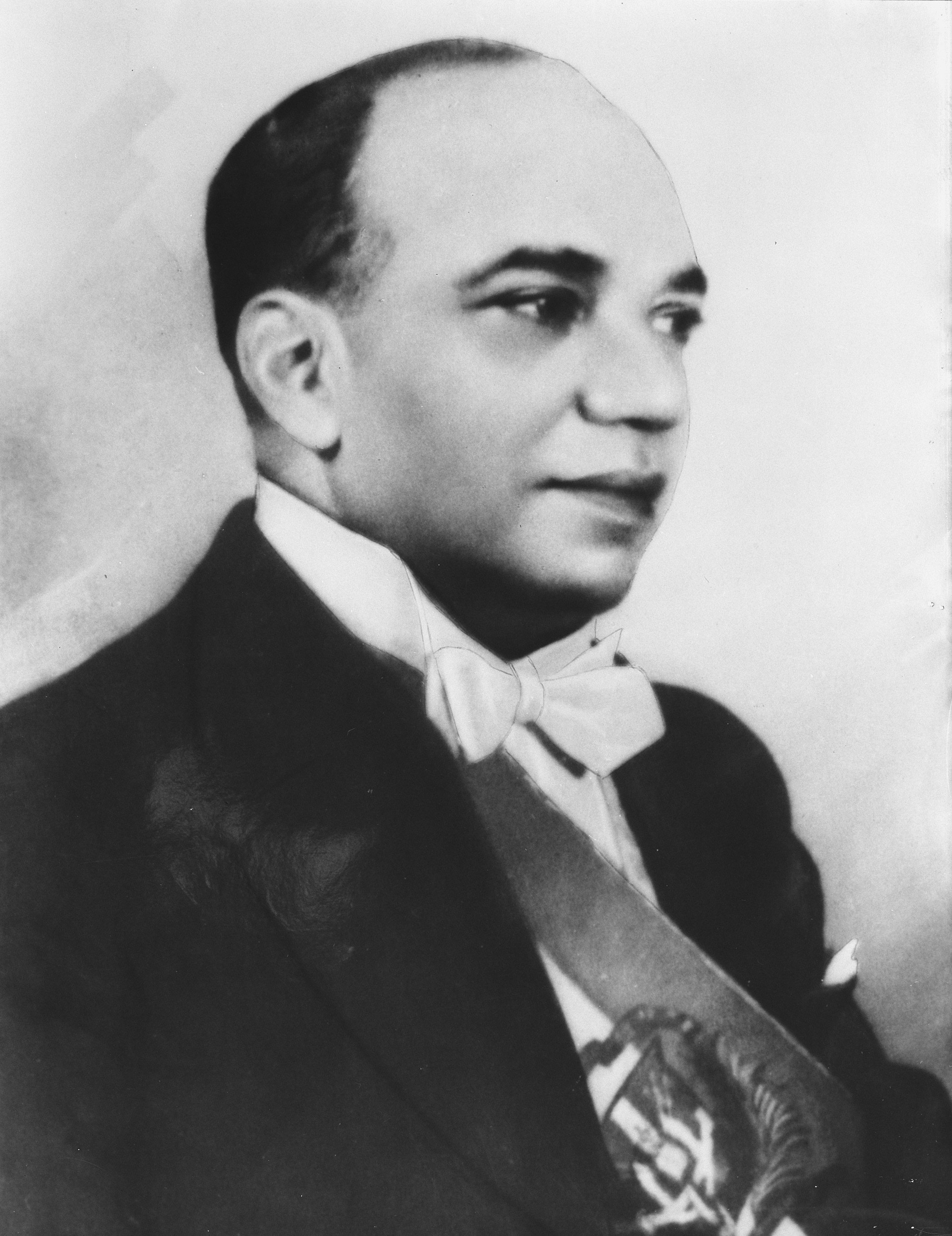
Nominee	Héctor Trujillo
Party	Dominican Party
Popular vote	1,098,816
Percentage	100%
President before election
Rafael Trujillo
Dominican Party
Elected President
Héctor Trujillo
Dominican Party

General elections were held in the Dominican Republic on 16 May 1952.

Rafael Trujillo, the country's de facto leader since 1930, stood down as president after his fourth non-consecutive term (he had previously served from 1930 to 1938). His brother, Héctor Trujillo, was the only candidate in the presidential election, and was elected unopposed, although Rafael maintained absolute control of the country. The Dominican Party won every seat in the Congressional elections.

== Results ==
Party	Candidate	Votes	%	Seats			
Party	Candidate	Votes	%	House	+/–	Senate	+/–
Dominican Party	Héctor Trujillo	1,098,816	100.00	50	+5	22	+3
Total		1,098,816	100.00	50	+5	22	+3
Source: Nohlen
