= Third Dominican Republic =

Period of Dominican statehood following the first U.S occupation (1924–1965)

Dominican Republic Spanish: República Dominicana
- 1924–1966
- Flag Coat of arms
- Anthem: Quisqueyanos valientes Valiant Quisqueyans
- Status: Dominican territory
- Capital: Santo Domingo / Ciudad Trujillo
- Common languages: Spanish
- Religion: Roman Catholic
- Government: Presidential republic under a totalitarian dictatorship (1930–1961)
- Generalissimo
  - 1934–1961: Rafael Trujillo
  - 1961: Ramfis Trujillo
- President (de jure)
  - 1930–1938: Rafael Trujillo
  - 1960–1962 (last): Joaquín Balaguer
- President (de facto)
  - 1924–1930 (first): Horacio Vásquez
  - 1966 (last): Héctor García-Godoy
- Historical era: Interwar period; World War II; Cold War
  - Horacio Vásquez becomes president, Dominican self-governance reestablished: 12 July 1924
  - Departure of US troops after the end of the first US occupation: 18 September 1924
  - Coup d'état: 28 February 1930
  - Assassination of Rafael Trujillo: 30 May 1961
  - Dominican Civil War begins: 24 April 1965
  - Second United States occupation of the Dominican Republic began: 28 April 1965
  - Dominican Civil War ends: 3 September 1965
  - Fourth Dominican Republic is established: 1 July 1966
- Currency: Dominican peso
Preceded by	Succeeded by
United States occupation of the Dominican Republic (1916–1924)	United States occupation of the Dominican Republic (1965–1966); Dominican Republic
- Today part of: Dominican Republic

The Third Dominican Republic was a predecessor of the Dominican Republic and existed from 12 July 1924 with the departure of American troops after the end of the first American occupation, until 1 July 1966 when Joaquín Balaguer became President of the Dominican Republic. De facto, the Third Republic ended on 28 April 1965 with the US occupation. This period is also known as the Age of Trujillo, because of the strong influence exerted by the totalitarian and autocratic Trujillo regime over much of these 41 years.

== See also ==
- History of the Dominican Republic
- First Dominican Republic
- Second Dominican Republic
- Vice Presidents of the Dominican Republic (1924–1965)
