= Alma McLaughlin =

First Lady of the Dominican Republic

Alma McLaughlin de Trujillo
- McLaughlin in 1968

First Lady of the Dominican Republic
- In office December 12, 1959 – August 4, 1960
- President: Héctor Trujillo
- Preceded by: María Martínez de Trujillo
- Succeeded by: Aída Mercedes Batlle

Personal details
- Born: Alma McLaughlin Simó; August 5, 1921 San Cristóbal, Dominican Republic
- Died: February 13, 2018 (aged 96) Coral Gables, Florida, United States
- Spouse: Hector Trujillo (m. 1959; died 2002)
- Parents: Charles McLaughlin (father); Zaida Simó Clark (mother)
- Relatives: Rafael Trujillo (brother-in-law); Ramfis Trujillo (nephew-in-law); Angelita Trujillo (niece-in-law)

Alma McLaughlin, known in the Dominican Republic as Alma McLaughlin Simó de Trujillo and in the United States as Alma McLaughlin Trujillo, (5 August 1921 – 13 February 2018) was a Dominican public figure and wife of former President Héctor Trujillo. She served as the First Lady of the Dominican Republic from 12 December 1959 to 4 August 1960.

McLaughlin was born within an upper-classfamily in San Cristóbal, Dominican Republic. Her father was Col. Charles McLaughlin, an American marine who arrived in the Dominican Republic during the United States occupation of the Dominican Republic (1916–1924), while her mother was Zaida Simó Clark, a Dominican of English heritage.

McLaughlin met and engaged in 1937 with Héctor Trujillo, who was 13 years her senior, at age 16. However, they did not marry until 1959 when he was President of the country as Trujillo's elder brother (Rafael Trujillo) did not consent their marriage, as he expected Héctor, his junior brother, to take care of their elderly mother instead of marrying.

McLaughlin and her husband exiled in Estoril, Portugal in 1961 and relocated first to Panama and later to Miami, United States. Trujillo died in 2002 and McLaughlin died in a nursing home in 2018.
