= 1934 Dominican Republic general election =

- 16 May 1934
- Presidential election
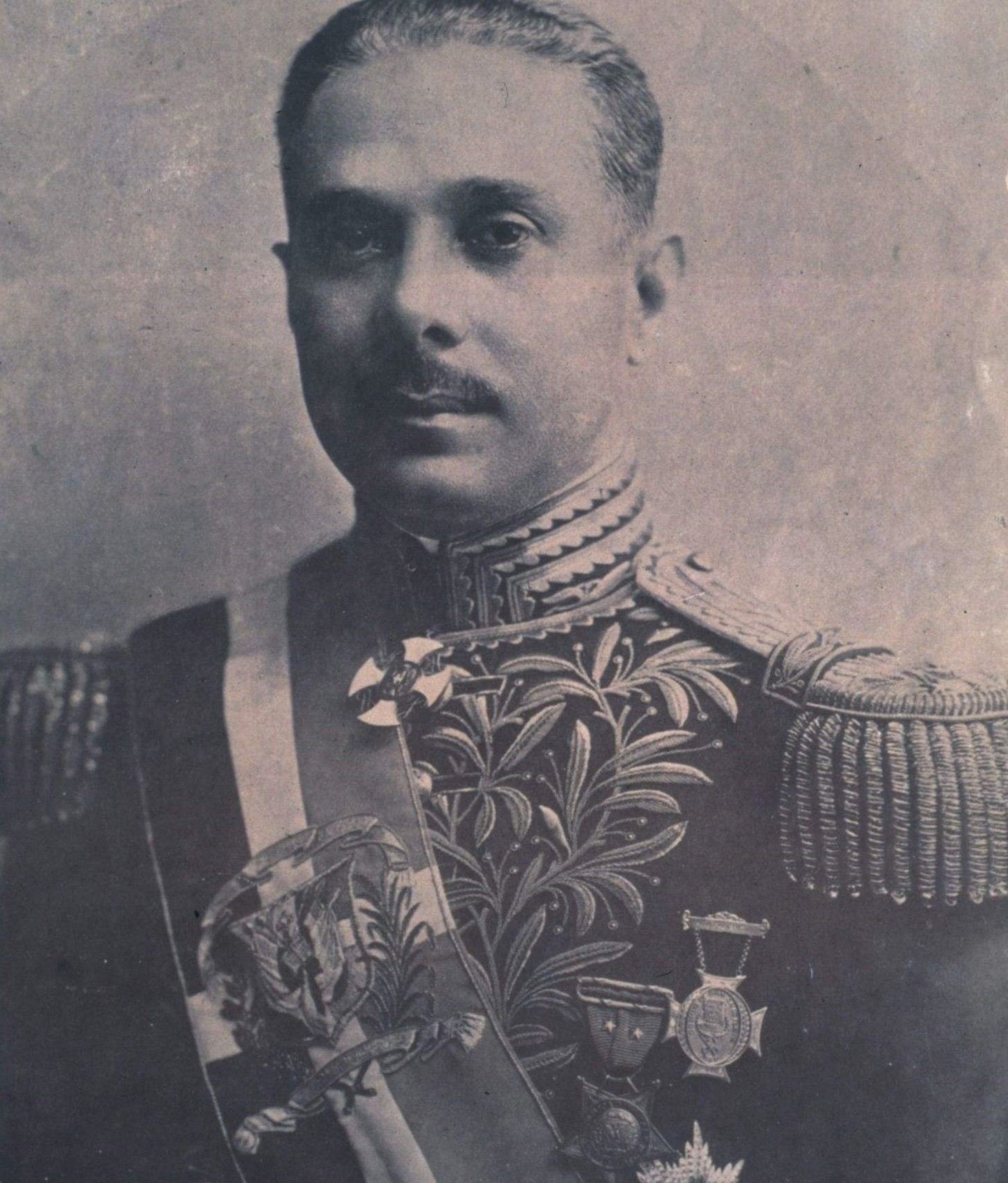
Nominee	Rafael Trujillo
Party	Dominican Party
Popular vote	256,423
Percentage	100%
President before election
Rafael Trujillo
Dominican Party
Elected President
Rafael Trujillo
Dominican Party

General elections were held in the Dominican Republic on 16 May 1934. Two years earlier, the Dominican Party of President Rafael Trujillo had been declared the only legally permitted party. However, the country had effectively been a one-party state since Trujillo assumed office in 1930.

Trujillo was the only candidate in the presidential election and was elected unopposed, whilst the Dominican Party won every seat in the Congressional elections. There was also an election for a Constitutional Assembly, whose role was to amend certain articles of the constitution.

== Results ==
Party	Candidate	Votes	%	Seats	
Party	Candidate	Votes	%	House	Senate
Dominican Party	Rafael Trujillo	256,423	100.00	31	12
Total		256,423	100.00	31	12
Registered voters/turnout		286,937	–		
Source: Nohlen
