= 1962 Dominican Republic general election =

- 20 December 1962
- Presidential election
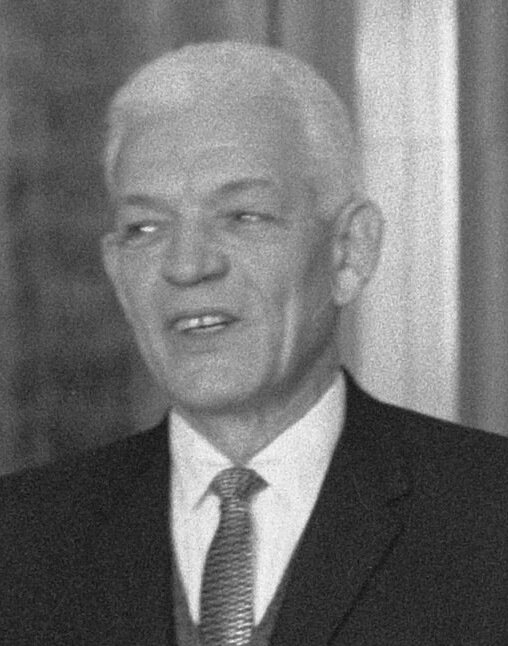

Nominee	Juan Bosch	Viriato Fiallo	Alfonso Moreno Martínez
Party	PRD	UCN	PRSC
Popular vote	628,044	317,327	54,638
Percentage	59.53%	30.08%	5.18%
- Results by department
President before election
Rafael Bonnelly
Dominican Party
Elected President
Juan Bosch
PRD

General elections were held in the Dominican Republic on 20 December 1962. They were the first after the end of the Rafael Trujillo dictatorship two years earlier, as well as the first with no military candidates for president since 1938. They are generally regarded to be the first free elections in the country's history.

Juan Bosch of the democratic socialist Dominican Revolutionary Party won the presidential election, whilst his party also won substantial majorities in both houses of Congress. There was also an election for a Constituent National Assembly, which was to amend certain articles of the constitution. However, reforms implemented by Bosch alienated the American government and the local oligarchy, leading to a coup the following year, and eventually the Dominican Civil War. Voter turnout was 65%.

== Results ==
=== President ===
Candidate	Party	Votes	%
Juan Bosch	Dominican Revolutionary Party	628,044	59.53
Viriato Fiallo	National Civic Union	317,327	30.08
Alfonso Moreno Martínez	Social Christian Revolutionary Party	54,638	5.18
Virgilio Maynardi Reyna	Democratic Revolutionary Nationalist Party	35,764	3.39
Juan Isidro Jimenes Grullón	Social Democratic Alliance	17,898	1.70
Joaquín Balaguer (Note: Candidacy declared illegal by the election commission.)	Authentic Dominican Revolutionary Party	1,273	0.12
Total		1,054,944	100.00
Valid votes		1,054,944	98.30
Invalid/blank votes		18,291	1.70
Total votes		1,073,235	100.00
Registered voters/turnout		1,646,973	65.16
Source: Nohlen

=== Congress ===
Party	Votes	%	Seats	
Party	Votes	%	House	Senate
Dominican Revolutionary Party	592,088	56.50	49	22
National Civic Union	315,371	30.09	20	4
Social Christian Revolutionary Party	56,794	5.42	1	0
Democratic Revolutionary Nationalist Party	36,972	3.53	4	1
Social Democratic Alliance	18,726	1.79	0	0
Dominican Revolutionary Vanguard	18,586	1.77	0	0
Authentic Dominican Revolutionary Party	5,306	0.51	0	0
National Party	4,161	0.40	0	0
Total	1,048,004	100.00	74	27
Valid votes	1,048,004	98.28		
Invalid/blank votes	18,291	1.72		
Total votes	1,066,295	100.00		
Registered voters/turnout	1,646,973	64.74		
Source: Nohlen
