= 1938 Dominican Republic general election =

- 16 May 1938
- Presidential election
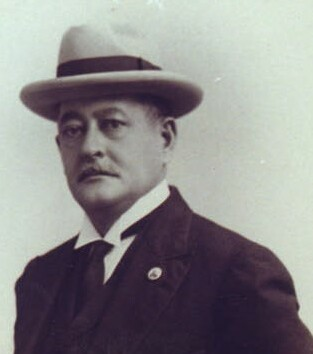
Nominee	Jacinto Peynado
Party	Dominican Party
Running mate	Manuel Troncoso de la Concha
Popular vote	319,680
Percentage	100%
President before election
Rafael Trujillo
Dominican Party
Elected President
Jacinto Peynado
Dominican Party

General elections were held in the Dominican Republic on 16 May 1938. At the time, the country was a single-party state, with the Dominican Party as the only legally permitted party.

Vice President Jacinto Peynado of the Dominican Party was the only candidate in the presidential election and was elected unopposed, although his predecessor Rafael Trujillo maintained absolute control of the country. The Dominican Party won every seat in the Senate elections.

== Results ==
Party	Candidate	Votes	%	Seats	
Party	Candidate	Votes	%	House	Senate
Dominican Party	Jacinto Peynado	319,680	100.00		13
Total		319,680	100.00	–	13
Registered voters/turnout		348,010	–		
Source: Nohlen
