= 1930 Dominican Republic general election =

- 16 May 1930
- Presidential election
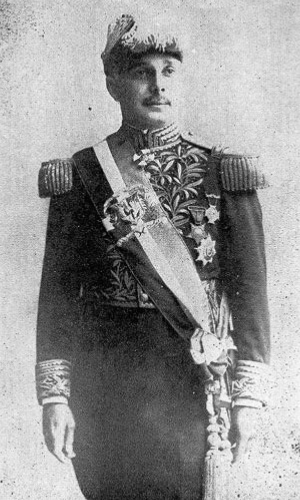
Nominee	Rafael Trujillo
Party	Confederation of Parties
Running mate	Rafael Estrella Ureña
Popular vote	223,926
Percentage	99.17%
President before election
Rafael Estrella Ureña (acting)
Republican
Elected President
Rafael Trujillo
CdP

General elections were held in the Dominican Republic on 16 May 1930. They were held three months after President Horacio Vásquez was deposed in a coup led by Rafael Estrella Ureña. In a deal with Estrella, Dominican Army commander Rafael Trujillo kept his men in barracks under the pretense of "neutrality," clearing the way for Estrella to take over as provisional president. In return, Trujillo was allowed to run for president in the May elections.

During the campaign, other candidates, as well as election officials, were subjected to severe harassment by Trujillo's soldiers. The other candidates withdrew when it became clear that Trujillo would be the only candidate allowed to campaign unhindered, leaving him to win the presidency unopposed. The Confederation of Parties (also called the Patriotic Coalition of Citizens), a pro-Trujillo grouping, won every seat in the Congressional elections.

Trujillo went on to rule the country for the next three decades, either as president or the power behind puppet presidents. According to official figures, the Dominican Party, which succeeded the Confederation of Parties in 1931, claimed to win elections with unanimous or near-unanimous support in all elections held during this time. It only dropped below 99 percent of the vote once in elections between 1934 and 1957.

== Results ==
Party	Candidate	Votes	%	Seats	
Party	Candidate	Votes	%	House	Senate
Confederation of Parties	Rafael Trujillo	223,926	99.17	31	12
Other parties	Against	1,870	0.83	0	0
Total		225,796	100.00	31	12
Registered voters/turnout		412,931	–		
Source: Nohlen
