= Dominican Party =

Dominican Party Partido Dominicano
- Abbreviation: PD
- Leader: Rafael Trujillo
- Founder: Rafael Trujillo
- Founded: 2 August 1931 (95 years, 105 days)
- Dissolved: 6 January 1962 (64 years, 313 days)
- Preceded by: Patriotic Coalition of Citizens
- Merged into: National Party
- Succeeded by: Democratic Hope Party
- Headquarters: Ciudad Trujillo, Distrito Nacional
- Newspaper: La Voz Del Partido Dominicano
- Ideology: Trujillism: Economic nationalism; Antihaitianismo; Right-wing populism; Authoritarian conservatism; Anti-communism
- Political position: Far-right
- Colors: Brown, Green
- Slogan: Rectitud, Libertad, Trabajo, Moralidad

Election symbol

The Dominican Party (Spanish: Partido Dominicano, PD) was the de facto only permitted political party in the Dominican Republic during the dictatorship of Rafael Trujillo, who ruled the country from 1930 to 1961. Its symbol was a palm tree.

== History ==
The Dominican Party was founded on 2 August 1931, a year after Trujillo came to power. It was an outgrowth of the "Patriotic Coalition of Citizens" that supported Trujillo's run for president. Soon afterward, it was proclaimed to be the only legal party.

On 16 August 1935, the HIN radio station, known as "The Voice of the Dominican Party", was opened. It was dedicated to serving as the media propagator of the activities of the Dominican Party.

The insignia of the Party had a motto that coincided with Trujillo's initials:

- Rectitud (Righteousness) = Rafael
- Libertad (Freedom; Liberty) = Leónidas
- Trabajo (Work; Labour) = Trujillo.

Later, he added: Moralidad (Morality) = Molina.

Officially, Trujillo was only president from 1930 until 1938 and from 1942 until 1952, and Minister of Foreign Affairs from 1953 until 1961. However, for 30 years he held the real power as leader of the Dominican Party and Generalissimo of the Dominican Army. In these roles, he was able to ensure that when he was not actually president, the position was held by family members or politicians allied to him: Jacinto Peynado (President from 1938 until 1940), Manuel de Jesús Troncoso de la Concha (President from 1940 until 1942), his brother Héctor (President from 1952 until 1960), and Joaquín Balaguer (took office as president in 1960; was president at the time of Trujillo's death). In this way, for the 31 years of his rule, he was able to maintain all governing power in the nation while appearing to be honorable and only hold power for 18 years.

All adult citizens of the Dominican Republic were required to be members of the party. They needed to carry "[the] three strikes" (Spanish: "los tres golpes"):

- Personal identity card
- Compulsory military service card
- Dominican Party membership card, popularly known as "La Palmita"

The party had no real ideology other than support for Trujillo. It lingered for a brief time after Trujillo's assassination in 1961. However, it was apparent there was no place for the party in the more open society, and it was finally wound up a little under two weeks after voting to dissolve itself on 28 December 1961.

At various times, Trujillo allowed other political parties to coexist. However, this was done only to impress foreign observers that democratization was progressing, and to allow Trujillo to monitor opponents.

== Electoral history ==
=== Presidential elections ===
Election	Party candidate	Votes	%	Result
1934	Rafael Trujillo	256,423	100%	Elected ✓
1938	Jacinto Peynado	319,680	100%	Elected ✓
1942	Rafael Trujillo	581,937	100%	Elected ✓
1947	Rafael Trujillo	781,389	92.98%	Elected ✓
1952	Héctor Trujillo	1,098,816	100%	Elected ✓
1957	Héctor Trujillo	1,265,681	100%	Elected ✓

=== Congressional elections ===
Election	Party leader	Chamber of Deputies					Senate		
Election	Party leader	Votes	%	Seats	+/–	Position	Seats	+/–	Position
1934	Rafael Trujillo	256,423	100%	31 / 31	▲31	Sole legal party	12 / 12	▲12	Sole legal party
1938	Rafael Trujillo	319,680	100%	Unknown		Sole legal party	13 / 13	▲1	Sole legal party
1942	Rafael Trujillo	581,937	100%	35 / 35		Sole legal party	16 / 16	▲3	Sole legal party
1947	Rafael Trujillo	781,389	92.98%	45 / 45	▲10	Sole legal party	19 / 19	▲3	Sole legal party
1952	Rafael Trujillo	1,098,816	100%	50 / 50	▲5	Sole legal party	22 / 22	▲3	Sole legal party
1957	Rafael Trujillo	1,265,681	100%	58 / 58	▲8	Sole legal party	23 / 23	▲1	Sole legal party

== See also ==
- Trujillo Era
- National Unity Party, the ruling party of neighboring Haiti under the Duvalier dynasty between 1957 and 1986.
