= 1924 Dominican Republic general election =

- 15 March 1924
- Presidential election
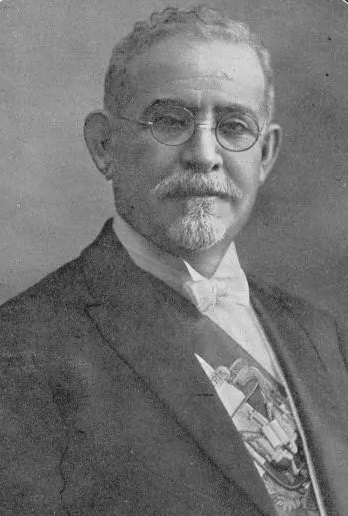

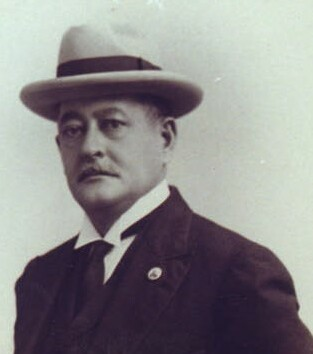
Nominee	Horacio Vasquez	Jacinto Peynado
Party	ANP	CPC
Popular vote	72,094	31,187
Percentage	69.80%	30.20%
President before election
Juan Bautista Vicini Burgos (provisional under US occupation)
Elected President
Horacio Vasquez

General elections were held in the Dominican Republic on 15 March 1924. Horacio Vásquez of the Progressive National Alliance won the presidential election, whilst his party also won the parliamentary elections and the Constitutional Assembly election.

== Results ==
Party	Candidate	Votes	%	Seats		
Party	Candidate	Votes	%	House	Senate	Assembly
Progressive National Alliance	Horacio Vásquez	72,094	69.80	24	10	25
Patriotic Coalition of Citizens	Jacinto Peynado	31,187	30.20	7	2	8
Total		103,281	100.00	31	12	33
Registered voters/turnout		147,228	–			
Source: Nohlen
