= Héctor Trujillo =

President of the Dominican Republic from 1952 to 1960

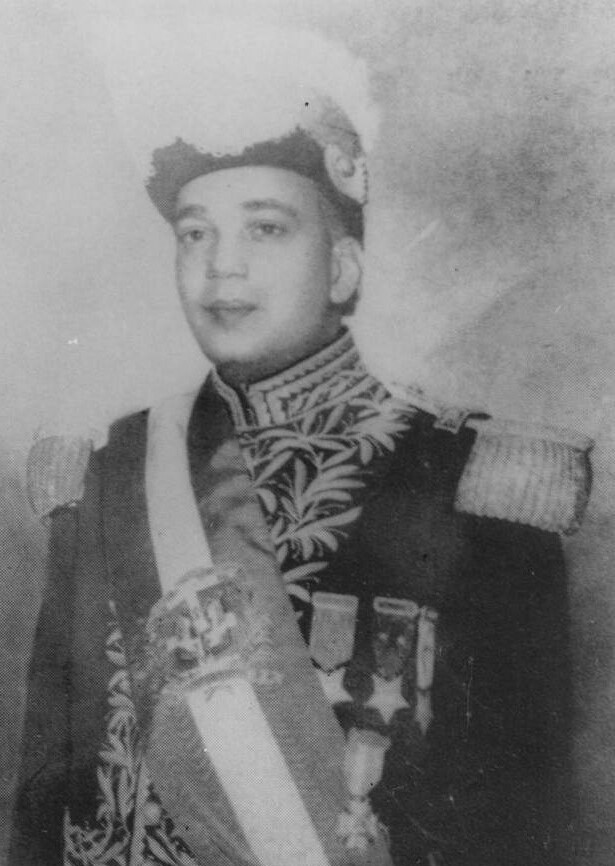
- Official portrait, 1952

40th President of the Dominican Republic
- In office 16 August 1952 – 3 August 1960
- Vice President: Vacant (1952–1957); Joaquín Balaguer (1957–1960)
- Leader: Rafael Trujillo
- Preceded by: Rafael Trujillo
- Succeeded by: Joaquín Balaguer

Personal details
- Born: 6 April 1908 San Cristóbal, Dominican Republic
- Died: 19 October 2002 (aged 94) Miami, Florida, United States
- Party: Dominican Party
- Spouse: Alma McLaughlin Simó
- Relations: Rafael Trujillo (brother)

Héctor Bienvenido "Negro" Trujillo Molina (6 April 1908 – 19 October 2002) was a Dominican politician and general who was the 40th president of the Dominican Republic from 1952 until 1960. He was the brother and puppet of former president and dictator Rafael Trujillo, the person who held the real power behind-the-scenes.

== Biography ==
Héctor Trujillo, nicknamed Negro for his facial features and dark complexion, was the youngest brother of Rafael Trujillo. After Trujillo rose to power in 1930, Hector entered the Army and advanced rapidly. He reached the rank of a major general before he was appointed "Secretary of State for War and Navy" in 1942. In 1944, he became "General of the Army', a newly created title. Aside from his military activities, Hector was busy amassing land and money. A philanderer, he became engaged to Alma McLaughlin in 1937, and the marriage eventually took place two decades later.

Héctor Trujillo worked as a "puppet" for his brother who had all the control; made president on August 16, 1952, he was asked to resign on August 3, 1960, when his brother reshuffled the government. After his brother's assassination in 1961 he conspired with his brother José Arismendi and Frank Chavez to organize a coup against President Joaquín Balaguer.

He died of natural causes in Miami on October 19, 2002. Trujillo was married to Alma McLaughlin Simó. The couple had no children.

Political offices
Preceded by Rafael Trujillo	President of the Dominican Republic; 1952–1960	Succeeded by Joaquín Balaguer
