= 1930 Dominican coup d'état =

1930 military coup in the Dominican Republic that brought Rafael Trujillo to power

- Part of Interwar period
Date	23 February 1930
Location	Dominican Republic
Result	Military coup d'état successful; Installation of the Rafael Trujillo military dictatorship

Belligerents
Government of the Dominican Republic	Army of the Dominican Republic

Commanders and leaders
Horacio Vasquez	Rafael Trujillo

The 1930 Dominican coup d'état was the military coup that took place in the Dominican Republic on February 23, 1930 when the Dominican Army, led by Rafael Trujillo, overthrew President Horacio Vasquez. Trujillo seized power, cemented his power in a rigged May 1930 election, establishing a military dictatorship that would last 31 years.

Trujillo plotted with the Coalicion Patriotica de Ciudadanos, the main opposition party, against the Vasquez government.

Vasquez and other adversaries of Trujillo were exiled.

== See also ==
- History of the Dominican Republic
