= Rafael Trujillo =

Dictator of the Dominican Republic from 1930 to 1961

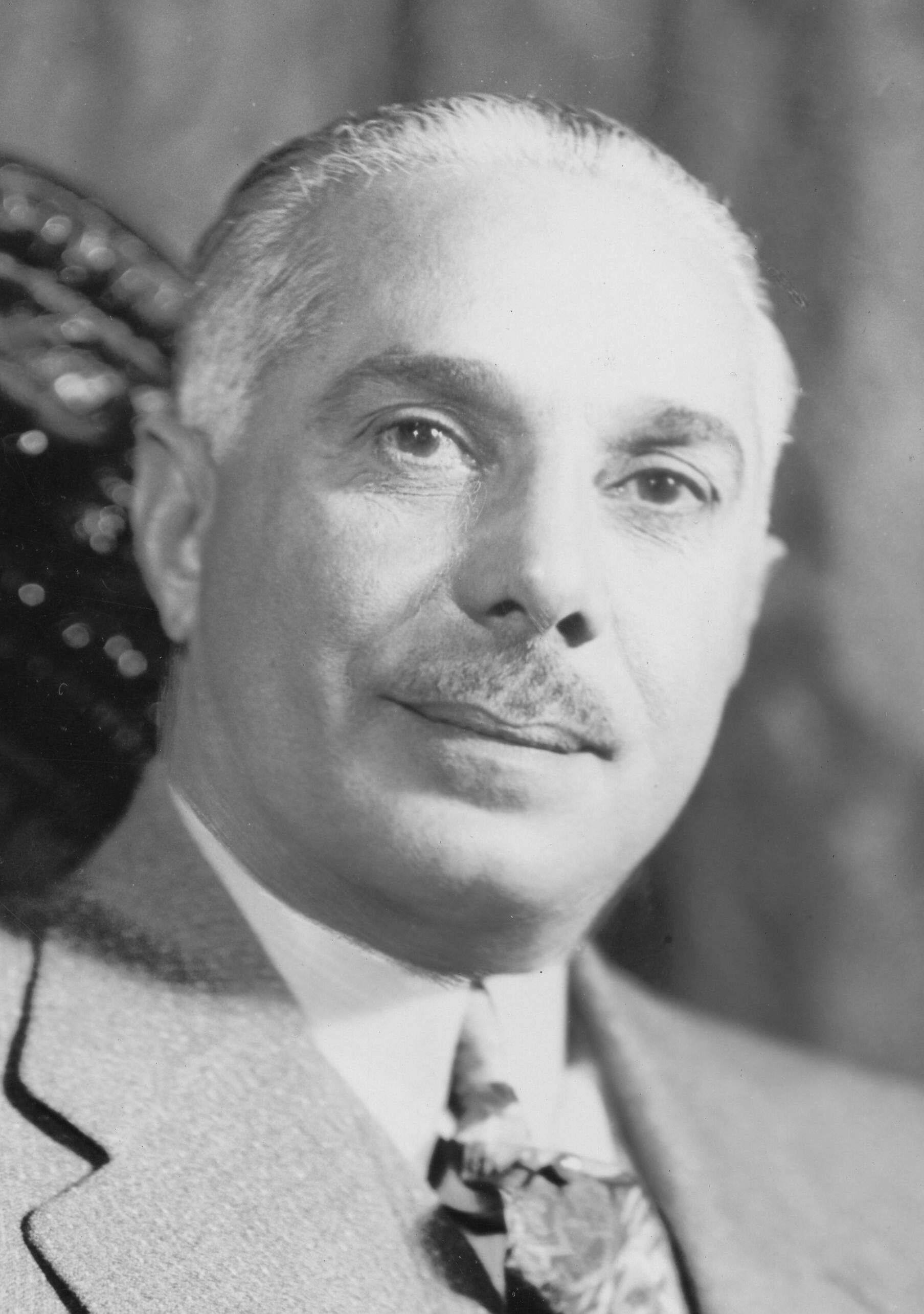
- Trujillo in 1940

1st Generalissimo of the Dominican Republic
- In office 16 August 1934 – 30 May 1961
- President: See list: Himself; Jacinto Peynado; Manuel Troncoso de la Concha; Himself; Héctor Trujillo; Joaquín Balaguer
- Preceded by: Position established
- Succeeded by: Ramfis Trujillo

36th and 39th President of the Dominican Republic
- In office 16 August 1942 – 16 August 1952
- Vice President: Vacant
- Preceded by: Manuel Troncoso de la Concha
- Succeeded by: Héctor Trujillo
- In office 16 August 1930 – 16 August 1938
- Vice President: Rafael Estrella Ureña (1930–1932); Vacant (1932–1934); Jacinto Peynado (1934–1938)
- Preceded by: Horacio Vásquez; Rafael Estrella Ureña (acting)
- Succeeded by: Jacinto Peynado

Personal details
- Born: Rafael Leónidas Trujillo y Molina; 24 October 1891 San Cristóbal, Dominican Republic
- Died: 30 May 1961 (aged 69) Ciudad Trujillo (Note: Present-day Santo Domingo), Dominican Republic
- Cause of death: Assassination by firearm
- Resting place: Père Lachaise Cemetery, Paris, France (1964-1970); Mingorrubio Cemetery, Madrid, Spain (since 1970)
- Party: Dominican Party
- Spouses: Aminta Ledesma y Pérez (m. 1913; div. 1925) Bienvenida Ricardo y Martínez (m. 1927; div. 1935) María de los Ángeles Martínez y Alba (m. 1937)
- Relations: Héctor Trujillo (brother); Alma McLaughlin (sister-in-law)
- Children: 8, including Ramfis and Angelita
- Profession: Soldier; politician; businessman

Military service
- Allegiance: Dominican Republic
- Branch/service: Dominican Army; Dominican National Police
- Years of service: 1916–1961
- Rank: Generalissimo (1934–1961)

Rafael Leónidas Trujillo Molina (/truːˈhiːjoʊ/ troo-HEE-yoh; Latin American Spanish: [rafaˈel tɾuˈxiʝo]; 24 October 1891 – 30 May 1961), nicknamed "El Jefe" (Latin American Spanish: [el ˈxefe]; lit. 'The Boss'), was a Dominican military officer and dictator who ruled the Dominican Republic from August 1930 until his assassination in May 1961. He was the country's 36th and 39th president, from 1930 to 1938 and from 1942 to 1952 respectively. He was also the country's first generalissimo, its de facto most powerful position at the time, from 1930 until his assassination. In that position, Trujillo ruled the country under figurehead presidents. (Note: Jacinto Peynado from 16 August 1938 to 24 February 1940; Manuel de Troncoso de la Concha from 24 February 1940 to 18 May 1942; Héctor Trujillo from 16 August 1952 to 3 August 1960; Joaquín Balaguer from 3 August 1960 until 16 January 1962, eight months after Trujillo's death.)

Trujillo's 31-year rule, known as the Age of Trujillo (Spanish: El Trujillato or La Era de Trujillo), was one of the longest for a non-royal leader in the world, and centered around a personality cult of the ruling family. It was also one of the most brutal; Trujillo's security forces, including the infamous SIM, were responsible for many murders. Estimates for the number of deaths in the Dominican Republic under Trujillo's regime range from 25,000 deaths and disappearances to over 50,000 deaths. In 1937, 17,000 to 35,000 Haitians were killed by the Dominican Army under Trujillo's orders in the infamous Parsley massacre, which continues to affect Dominican-Haitian relations.

During his long rule, the Trujillo government's extensive use of state terrorism was prolific even beyond national borders, including the attempted assassination of Venezuelan president Rómulo Betancourt in 1960, the abduction and disappearance in New York City of the Basque exile Jesús Galíndez in 1956, and the murder of Spanish writer José Almoina in Mexico, also in 1960. These acts, particularly the presumed murder of Galíndez, a naturalized US citizen, the attempted murder of Betancourt, a staunch critic of Trujillo, and the murder of the Mirabal sisters, who were among his most notable opponents, in 1960, eroded relations between the Dominican Republic and the international community and ushered in OAS sanctions and economic and military assistance to Dominican opposition forces. After this momentous year, large segments of the Dominican establishment, including the military, turned against him.

On 30 May 1961, Trujillo was assassinated by a group of conspirators led by general Antonio Imbert Barrera. In the immediate aftermath, Trujillo's son Ramfis took temporary control of the country, executing most of the conspirators. By November 1961, the Trujillo family was pressured into exile by the titular president Joaquín Balaguer, who introduced reforms to open up the regime. The murder ushered in civil strife which concluded with the Dominican Civil War and a US-OAS intervention. The Dominican Republic eventually stabilised under a multi-party system in 1966.

The Trujillo era unfolded in the Dominican Republic when the Caribbean was particularly susceptible to dictators. (Note: Jésus de Galindez points out in the introduction of his book La Era de Trujillo that "In this summer of 1955, half the Caribbean republics are ruled by dictatorships, most of them of the military type".) In the countries of the Caribbean Basin alone, his dictatorship overlapped with those in Cuba, Nicaragua, Guatemala, El Salvador, Honduras, Venezuela and Haiti. In perspective, the Trujillo dictatorship has been judged more prominent and more brutal than its contemporaries. Trujillo remains a polarizing figure in the Dominican Republic, as the sheer longevity of his rule makes a detached evaluation difficult. While his supporters credit him for bringing long-term stability, economic growth and prosperity, doubling life expectancy of average Dominicans and multiplying the GDP, critics denounce the heavy-handed and violent nature of his regime, including the murder of tens of thousands, and xenophobia towards Haitians, as well as the Trujillo family's nepotism, widespread corruption and looting of the country's natural and economic resources.

== Early life ==
Rafael Leónidas Trujillo y Molina was born on 24 October 1891 in San Cristóbal, Dominican Republic, into a lower-middle class family.

His father was José Trujillo Valdez, the son of Silveria Valdez Méndez of Spanish colonial Dominican origin and José Trujillo Monagas, a Spaniard Canary Islander sergeant who arrived in Santo Domingo as a member of the Spanish reinforcement troops during the annexation era. Trujillo's mother was Altagracia Julia Molina Chevalier, later known as Mamá Julia, daughter of the farmer Pedro Molina Peña, also of Spanish colonial Dominican origin, and teacher Luisa Erciná Chevalier, whose parents were of French and light mulatto Haitian origin respectively.

Chevalier, Trujillo's maternal grandmother, was the daughter of Justin Victor Turenne Carrié Blaise, who was of French descent, and Eleonore Juliette Chevallier Moreau, who was part of the island's French mulatto class. From her mother's side, Chevalier was granddaughter of Louise Moreau and her husband Bernard Chevallier Louverture, a mulatto Haitian high-ranking officer and politician that established in San Cristóbal, who was the son of French nobleman Jean Baptiste Chevallier, Marquis de Pouilboreau and his wife Marie-Noëlle Louverture.

Trujillo was the third of eleven children; (Note: his siblings were Virgilio Trujillo (24 July 1887 – 29 July 1967), Flérida Marina Trujillo (10 August 1888 – 13 February 1976), Rosa María Julieta Trujillo (5 April 1893 – 23 October 1980), José Arismendy "Petán" Trujillo (4 October 1895 – 6 May 1969), Amable Romero "Pipi" Trujillo (14 August 1896 – 19 September 1970), Luisa Nieves Trujillo (4 August 1899 – 25 January 1977), Julio Aníbal "Bonsito" Trujillo (16 October 1900 – 2 December 1948), Pedro Vetilio "Pedrito" Trujillo (27 January 1902 – 14 March 1981), Ofelia Japonesa Trujillo (26 May 1905 – 4 February 1978) and Héctor Bienvenido "Negro" Trujillo (6 April 1908 – 19 October 2002).) he also had an adopted brother, Luis Rafael "Nene" Trujillo (1935–2005), who was raised in the home of Trujillo Molina.

In 1897, at the age of six, Trujillo was registered in the school of Juan Hilario Meriño. One year later, he transferred to the school of Pablo Barinas, where he was educated by disciples of Eugenio María de Hostos and remained there for the rest of his primary schooling. As a child, he was obsessed with his appearance and would place bottle caps on his clothes that mimicked military decorations. At the age of 16, Trujillo got a job as a telegraph operator, which he held for about three years. Shortly after Trujillo, aided by his brother José Arismendy Petán, turned to petty crime: cattle rustling, check counterfeiting, and postal robbery. He spent several months in prison, which did not deter him, as he later formed a violent gang of robbers called The 42.

== Rise to power ==
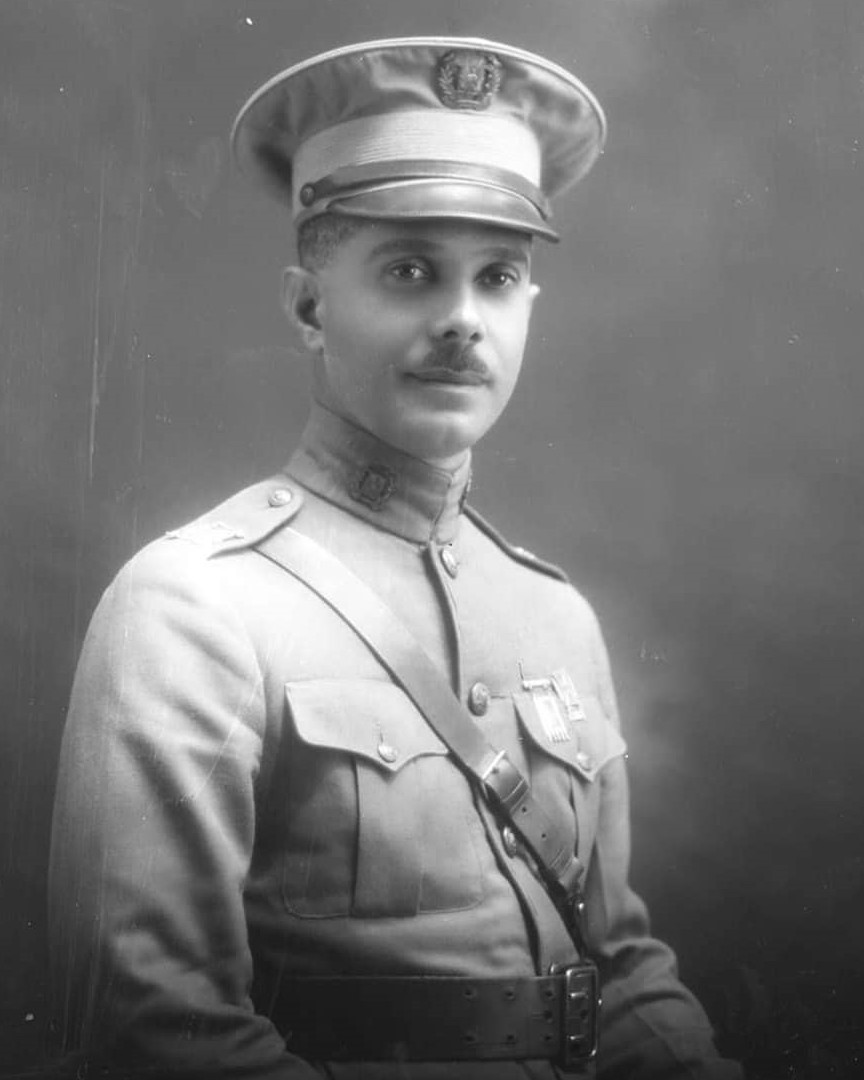
Trujillo in 1922

In 1916, the United States began its occupation of the Dominican Republic following 28 revolutions in 50 years. At the time, Trujillo was 25 years old and worked as a guarda campestre (overseer) at a sugar cane plantation in Boca Chica. The occupying force soon established a Dominican army constabulary to impose order. Trujillo joined the newly created National Guard in 1918 with the help of his employer along with US Major James J. MacLean, a friend of his maternal uncle Teódulo Pina Chevalier. Trujillo was soon promoted to second lieutenant and began training with the US Marines.

Allegations of forgery were ignored when Trujillo applied and he was later acquitted by a panel of Marines following plausible accusations against him, including the alleged rape and subsequent extortion of a 16-year-old girl. Colonel Richard Malcolm Cutts trained Trujillo further and many Marine leaders praised his abilities at the time, approving his rise among the ranks. He was promoted to lieutenant in 1919 and assigned to the San Pedro de Macorís garrison; he was later promoted to captain in 1922 while stationed in San Francisco de Macorís and given command of the National Guard 10th Company. In 1923 he was promoted to major and appointed Inspector of the 1st military district.

President Horacio Vásquez named Trujillo the commander of the National Police in 1924. He was named brigadier general in 1928. Trujillo militarized the police, turning it into an army. It evolved into a de facto independent body under his control. A coup d'état against President Vásquez broke out in February 1930 in Santiago. Trujillo secretly cut a deal with the rebel leader Rafael Estrella Ureña. In return for Trujillo letting Estrella take power, Estrella would allow Trujillo to run for president in new elections.

As the rebels marched toward Santo Domingo, Vásquez ordered Trujillo to suppress them. However, feigning neutrality, Trujillo kept his men in barracks, allowing Estrella's rebels to take the capital virtually unopposed. On 3 March, Estrella was proclaimed acting president, with Trujillo confirmed as head of the police and of the army. As per their agreement, Trujillo became the presidential nominee of the Patriotic Coalition of Citizens (Spanish: Coalición patriotica de los ciudadanos), with Estrella as his running mate.

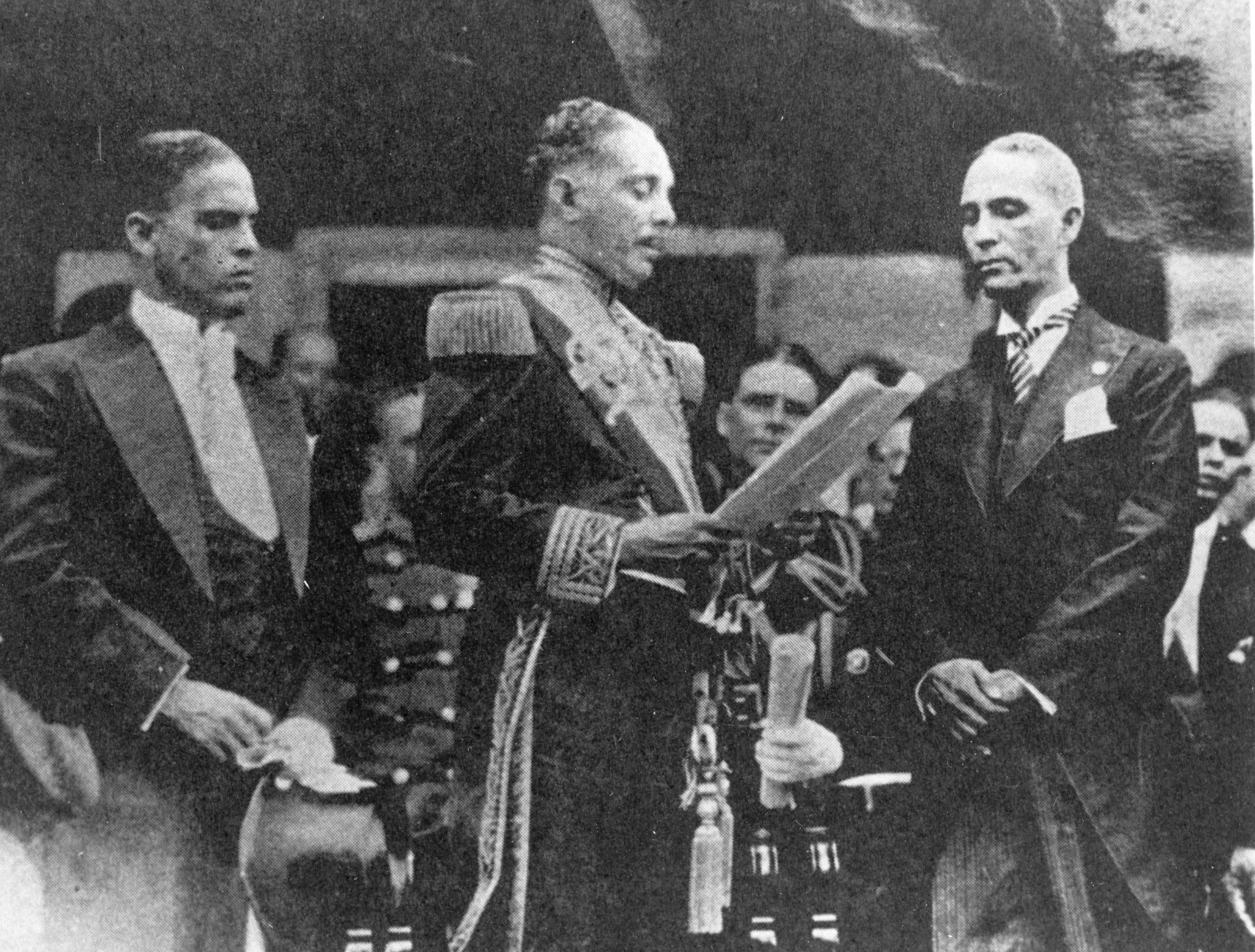
Trujillo (center) and Rafael Estrella Ureña (left) being sworn in as president and vice president, 16 August 1930.

The other candidates became targets of harassment by the army. When it became apparent that the army would allow only Trujillo to campaign unhindered, the other candidates pulled out. Ultimately, the Trujillo-Estrella ticket was proclaimed victorious with an implausible 99% of the vote. In a note to the US State Department, American ambassador Charles Boyd Curtis wrote that Trujillo received far more votes than there were actual voters. Upon taking office on 16 August, Trujillo assumed dictatorial powers which he retained for the next three decades.

== In government ==
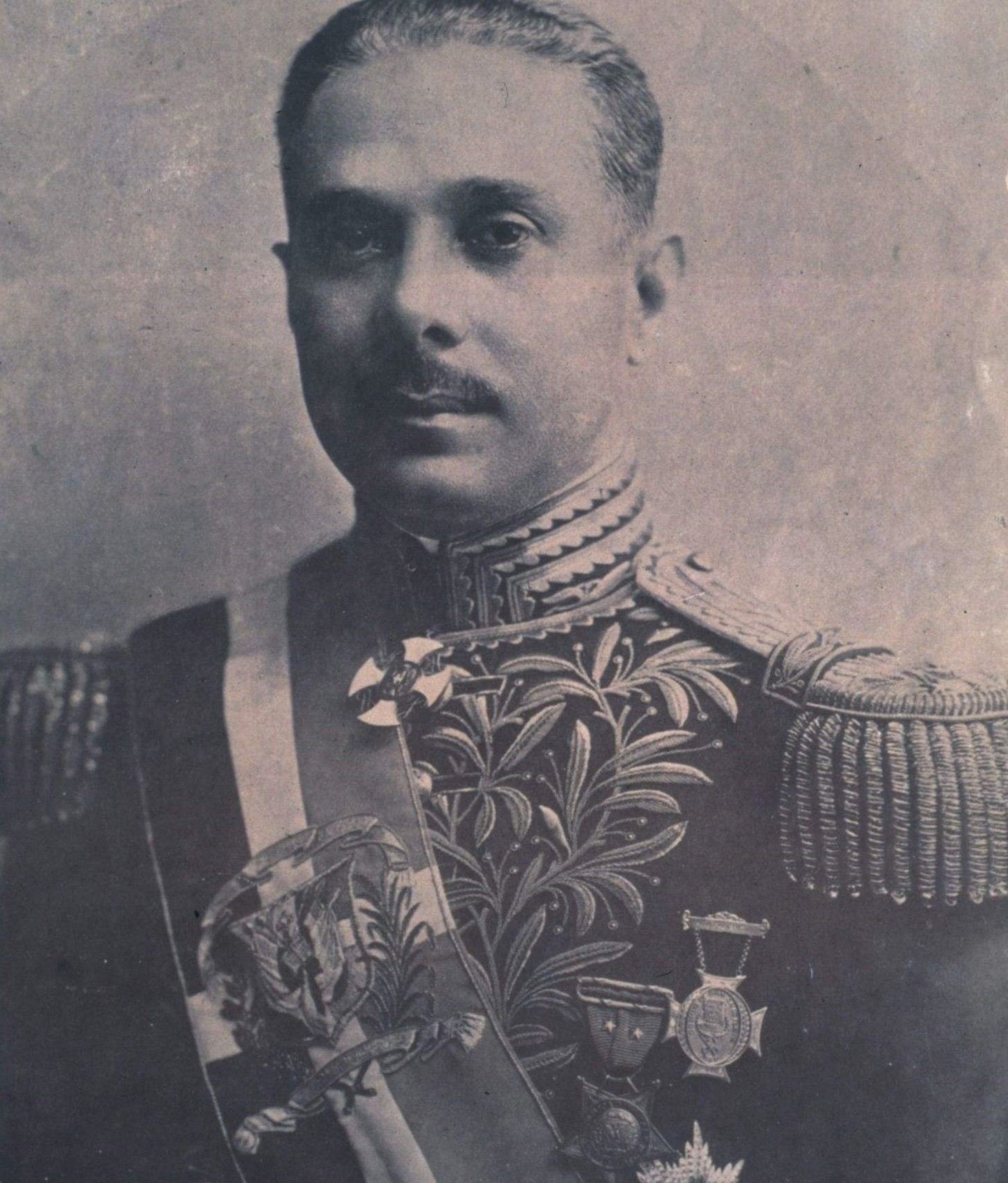
Trujillo in 1933

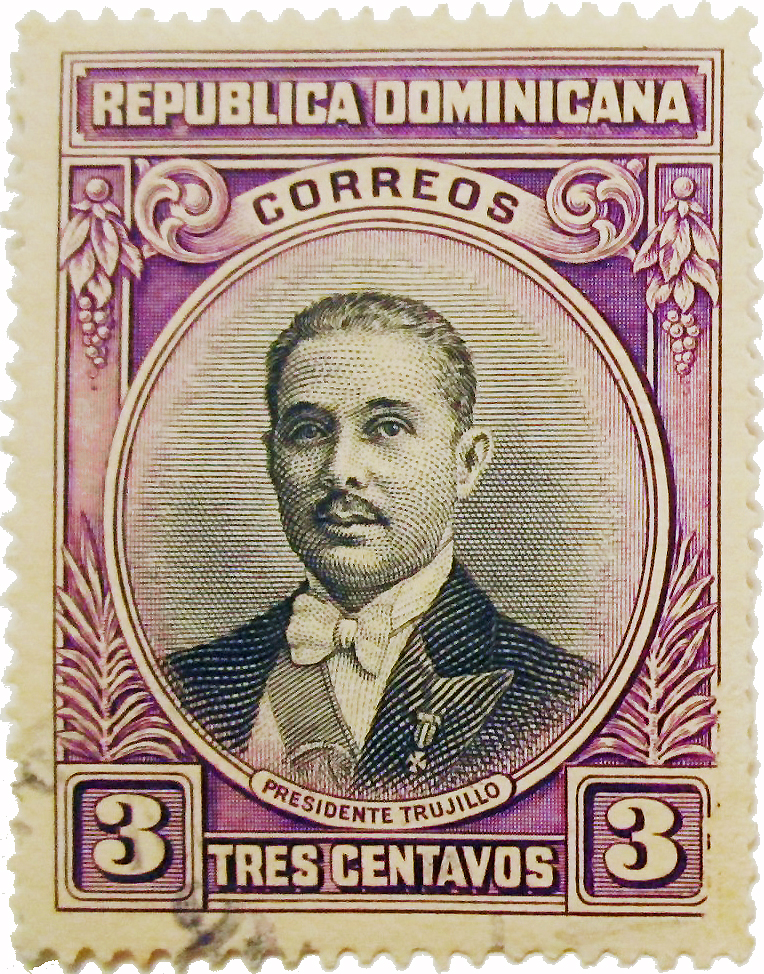
Stamp issued in 1933 on the occasion of Trujillo's 42nd birthday

Two and a half weeks after Trujillo ascended to the presidency, the destructive Hurricane San Zenón hit Santo Domingo and left 2000 dead. As a response to the disaster, Trujillo placed the Dominican Republic under martial law and began to rebuild the city. He renamed the rebuilt capital Ciudad Trujillo ("Trujillo City") in his honor and had streets, monuments, and landmarks to honor him throughout the country.

On 16 August 1931, the first anniversary of his inauguration, Trujillo made the Dominican Party, founded two weeks earlier, the nation's sole legal political party. However, the country had effectively become a one-party state with Trujillo's inauguration. Government employees were required by law to "donate" 10% of their salaries to the national treasury and there was strong pressure on adult citizens to join the party. Members had to carry a membership card, nicknamed the "Palmita" since the cover had a palm tree on it, and a person could be arrested for vagrancy without one. Those who did not join or contribute to the party did so at their own risk. Opponents of the regime were mysteriously killed.

In 1934, Trujillo, who had promoted himself to generalissimo of the army, was up for re-election. By then, there was no organized opposition left in the country, and he was re-elected unopposed. In addition to the widely rigged (and regularly uncontested) elections, he organized "civic reviews" with large crowds shouting their loyalty to the government, which would in turn create more support for Trujillo.

== Personality cult ==
Heraldic flag used by Trujillo as Generalissimo of the Armies

In 1936, at the suggestion of Mario Fermín Cabral, the Congress of the Dominican Republic voted overwhelmingly to change the name of the capital from Santo Domingo to Ciudad Trujillo. The province of San Cristóbal was renamed to "Trujillo" and the nation's highest peak, Pico Duarte, to Pico Trujillo. Statues of "El Jefe" were mass-produced and erected across the Dominican Republic, and bridges and public buildings were named in his honor.

The nation's newspapers had praise for Trujillo as part of the front page, and license plates included slogans such as "¡Viva Trujillo!" and "Año del Benefactor de la Patria" (Year of the Benefactor of the Nation). An electric sign was erected in Ciudad Trujillo so that "Dios y Trujillo" could be seen at night as well as in the day. Eventually, even churches were required to post the slogan "Dios en el cielo, Trujillo en la tierra" (God in Heaven, Trujillo on Earth). As time went on, the order of the phrases was reversed (Trujillo on Earth, God in Heaven). Trujillo was recommended for the Nobel Peace Prize by his admirers, but the committee declined the suggestion.

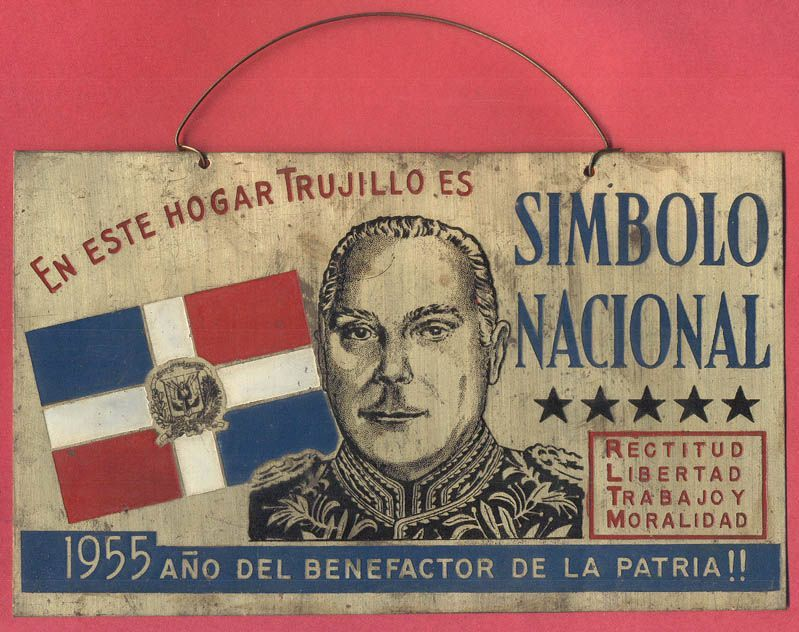
Trujillo era sign, which reads in Spanish: "In this household, Trujillo is a national symbol"

Trujillo was eligible to run again in 1938, but citing the US example of two presidential terms, he stated, "I voluntarily, and against the wishes of my people, refuse re-election to the high office." In fact, a vigorous re-election campaign had been launched in the middle of 1937 but the international uproar that followed the Haitian massacre later that year forced Trujillo to announce his "return to private life." Consequently, the Dominican Party nominated Trujillo's handpicked successor vice president Jacinto Peynado, with Manuel de Jesús Troncoso being his running mate. They appeared alone on the ballot in the 1938 election.

Trujillo kept his positions as generalissimo of the army and leader of the Dominican Party. It was understood that Peynado was merely a puppet, and Trujillo still held all governing power in the nation. Peynado increased the size of the electric "Dios y Trujillo" sign and resigned from office on 24 February 1940, dying a few weeks later on 7 March, with Troncoso serving out the rest of the term. However, in 1942, with US President Franklin D. Roosevelt having run for a third term in the US, Trujillo ran for president again and was elected unopposed. He served for two terms, which he lengthened to five years each.

In 1952, under pressure from the Organization of American States, he ceded the presidency to his brother, Héctor. As he was still the de facto leader, Trujillo organized a major national celebration to commemorate 25 years of his rule in 1955. Gold and silver commemorative coins were minted with his image.

== Oppression ==
Brutal oppression of actual or perceived members of the opposition was the key feature of Trujillo's rule from the very beginning in 1930 when his gang, The 42, led by Miguel Angel Paulino, drove through the streets in their red Packard, the carro de la muerte ("car of death"). Trujillo also maintained an execution list of people throughout the world who he felt were his direct enemies or who he felt had wronged him. He even once allowed an opposition party to form and permitted it to operate legally and openly, mainly so that he could identify those who opposed him and arrest or kill them.

Imprisonments and killings were later handled by the SIM, the Servicio de Inteligencia Militar, efficiently organized by Johnny Abbes, who operated in Cuba, Mexico, Guatemala, New York, Costa Rica, and Venezuela. Some cases reached international notoriety such as the disappearance of Jesús de Galíndez and the murder of the Mirabal sisters, which further eroded Trujillo's critical support by the US government.

In April 1962, after the flight of the Trujillo family from the country, Attorney General Eduardo Antonio Garcia Vasquez reported that in the previous five years, the former regime was responsible for 5,700 deaths, either as known murders, or of those missing but presumed dead. The SIM often denied victims' families the remains of their loved ones, disposing of them clandestinely. In the aftermath of Trujillo's assassination, very few of those arrested and killed in the subsequent crackdown had their remains returned, the majority believed by investigators from Vasquez's office to have been tossed to sharks or stuffed into an incinerator at nearby San Isidro airbase.

== Immigration ==
Trujillo was known for his open-door policy, accepting Jewish refugees from Europe, Japanese migration during the 1930s, and exiles from Spain following its civil war. At the 1938 Évian Conference the Dominican Republic was the only country willing to accept many Jews and offered to accept up to 100,000 refugees on generous terms. In 1940 an agreement was signed and Trujillo donated 26,000 acres (110 km^{2}) of his properties for settlements. The first settlers arrived in May 1940; eventually, some 800 settlers came to Sosúa but harsh economic conditions made most of them move later on to the United States.

Refugees from Europe broadened the Dominican Republic's tax base and added more whites to the predominantly mixed-race nation. Trujillo's government favoured white refugees over others while Dominican troops expelled illegal immigrants, resulting in the 1937 Parsley Massacre of Haitian migrants.

== Environmental policy ==
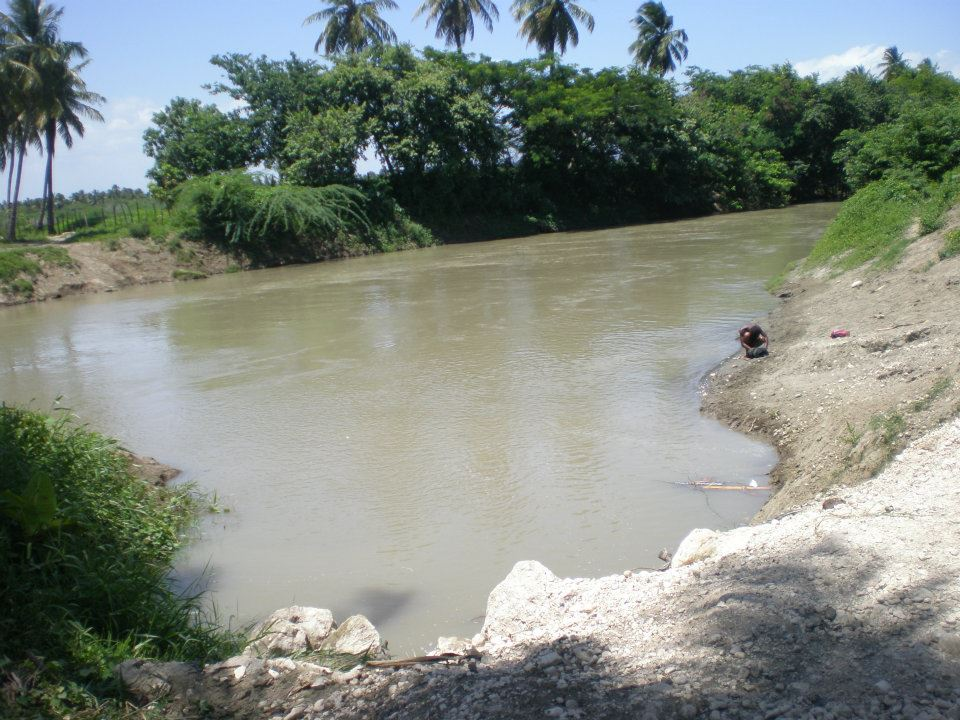
Yaque del Sur River in 2018; Trujillo was known for his pro-conservation policies for the natural environment of Dominican Republic and built a huge nature reserve around this river.

The Trujillo regime greatly expanded the Vedado del Yaque, a nature reserve around the Yaque del Sur River. In 1934 he banned the slash-and-burn method of clearing land for agriculture, set up a forest warden agency to protect the park system, and banned the logging of pine trees without his permission. In the 1950s the Trujillo regime commissioned a study on the hydroelectric potential of damming the Dominican Republic's waterways. The commission concluded that only forested waterways could support hydroelectric dams, so Trujillo banned logging in potential river watersheds. After his assassination in 1961, logging resumed in the Dominican Republic. Squatters burned down the forests for agriculture, and logging companies clear-cut parks. In 1967, President Joaquín Balaguer launched military strikes against illegal logging.

== Foreign policy ==
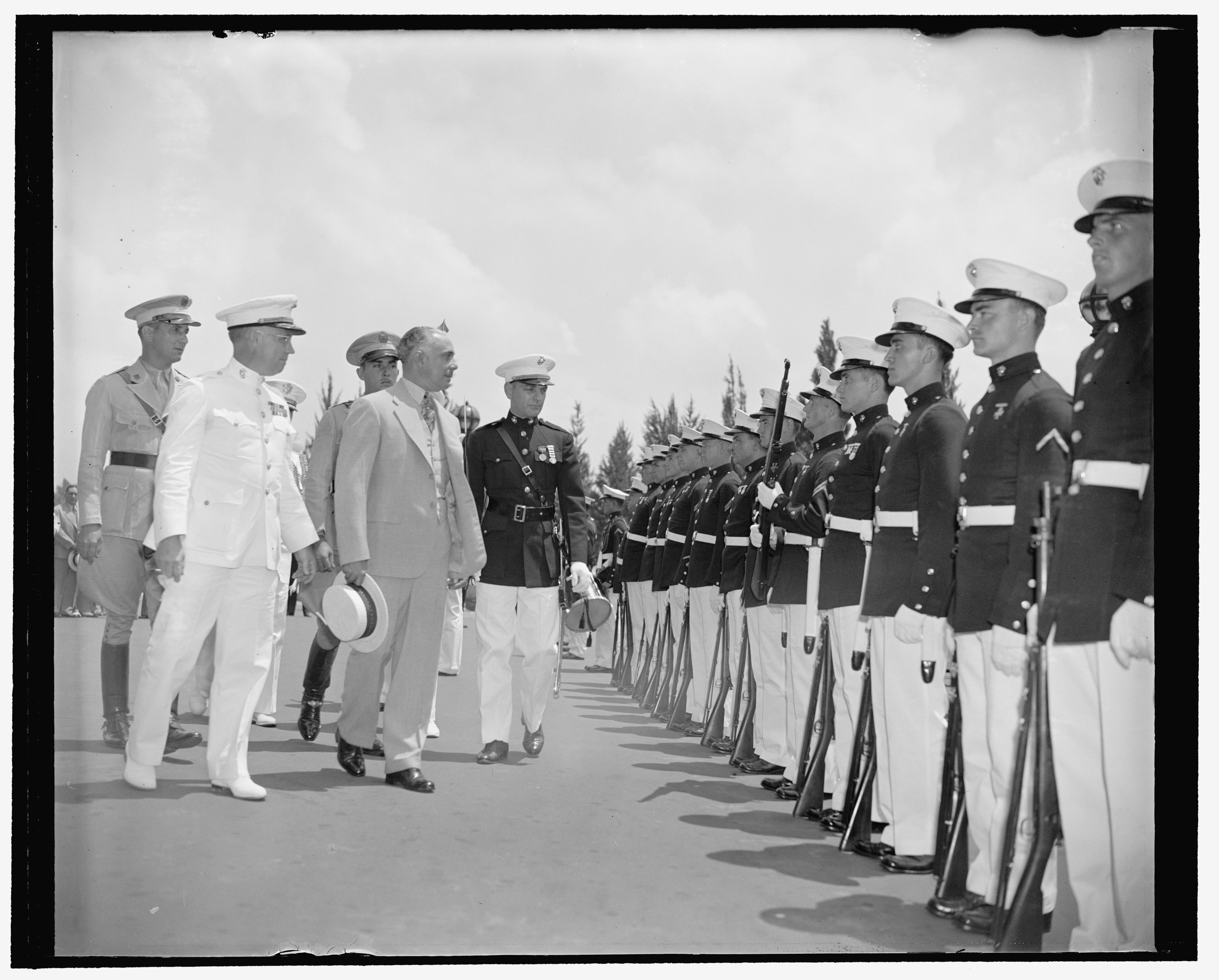
Trujillo in Washington, D.C. in 1939

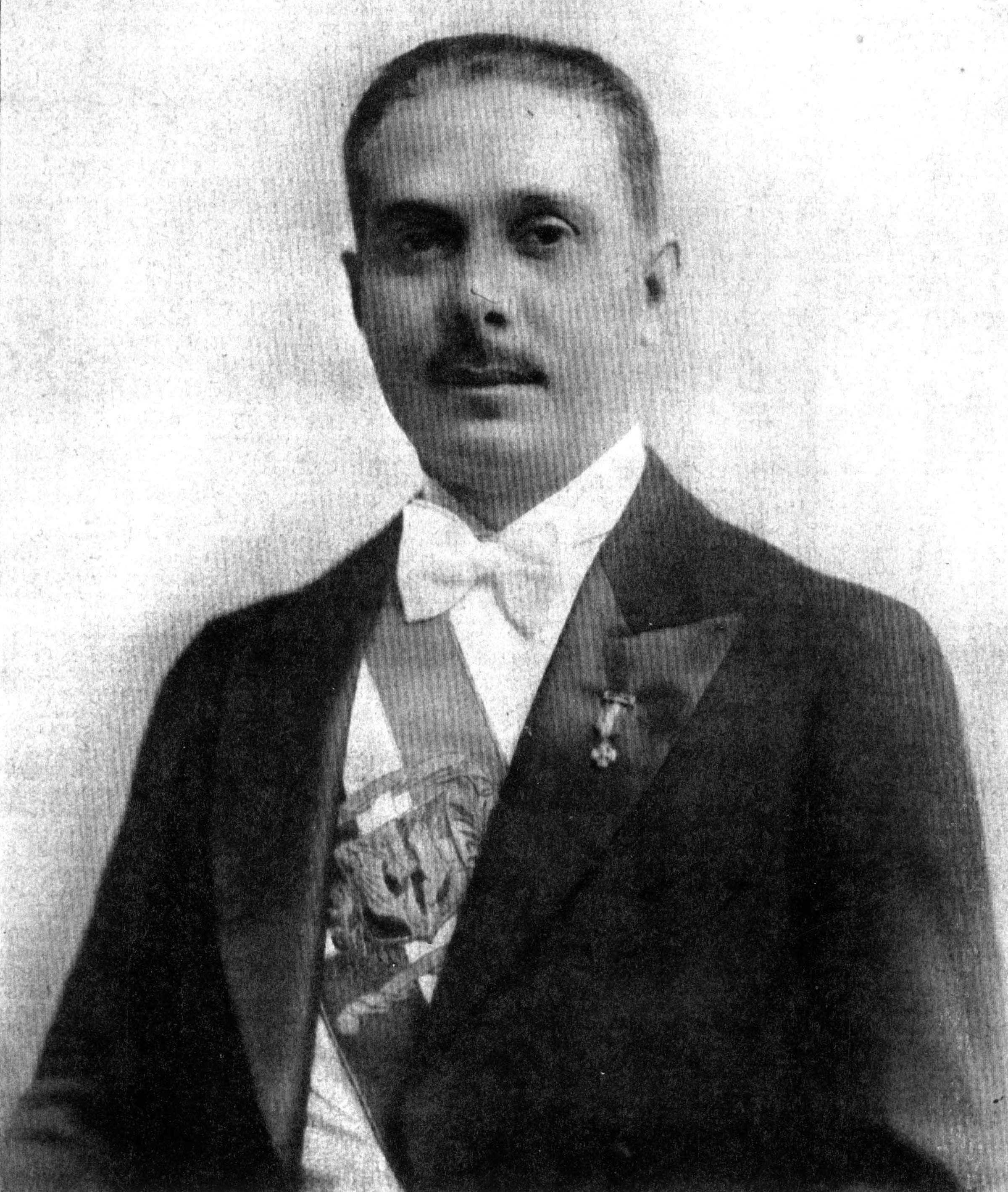
Trujillo in 1945

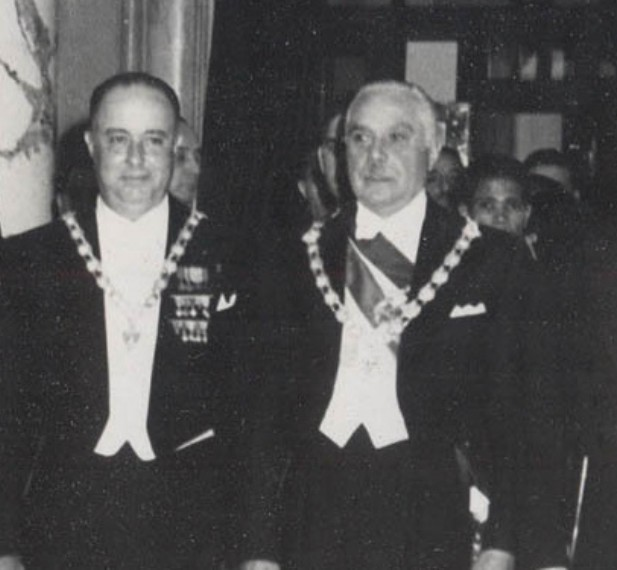
Rafael Trujillo (right) and Nicaraguan president Anastasio Somoza García (left) at the inauguration of Héctor Trujillo as president in 1952

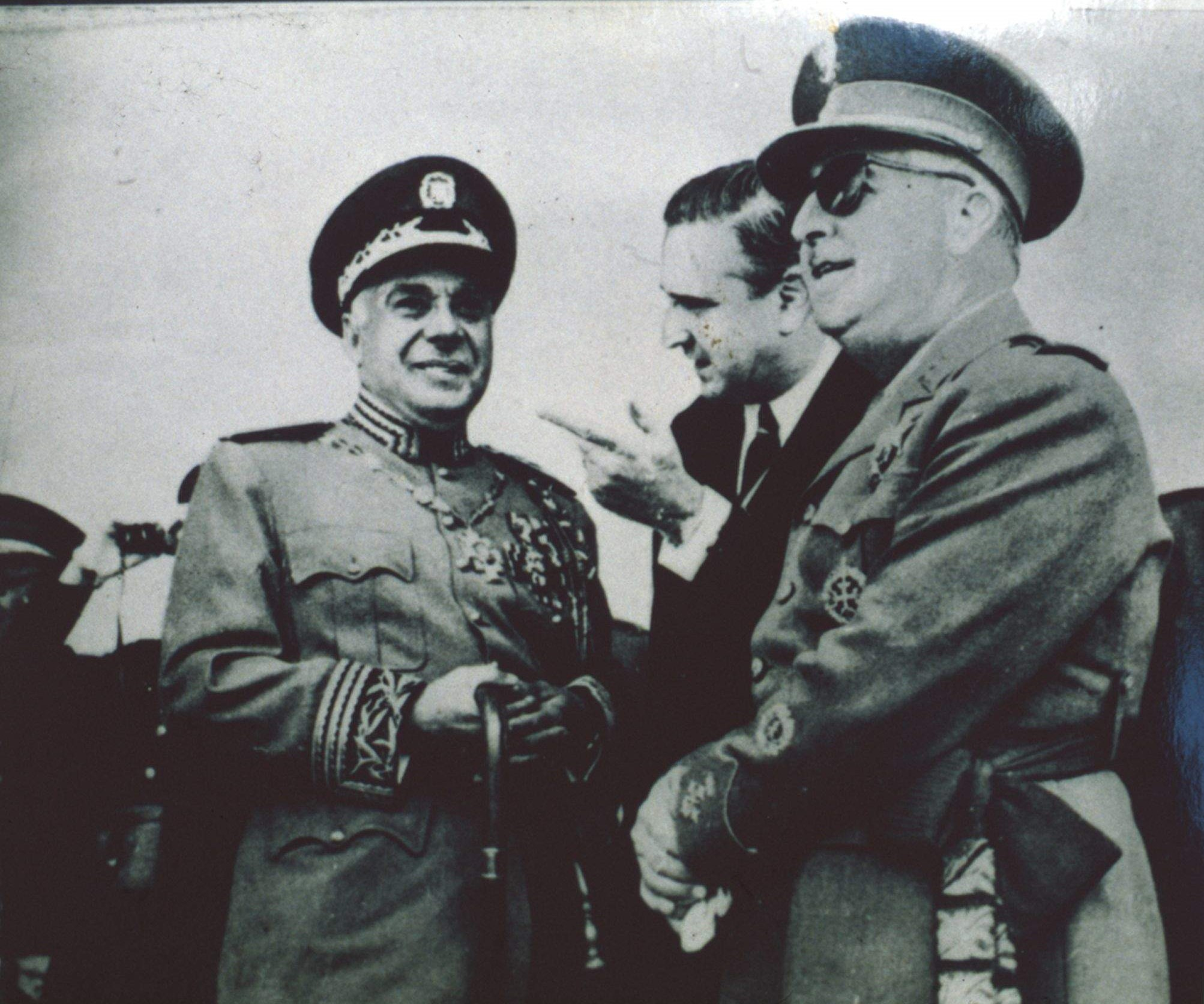
Trujillo with Spanish leader Francisco Franco in 1954

Trujillo tended toward peaceful coexistence with the United States government. During World War II, Trujillo symbolically sided with the Allies and declared war on Germany, Italy and Japan on 11 December 1941. While there was no military participation, the Dominican Republic thus became a founding member of the United Nations. Trujillo encouraged diplomatic and economic ties with the United States, but his policies often caused friction with other nations of the Americas, especially Costa Rica and Venezuela. He maintained friendly relations with Franco of Spain, Perón of Argentina, and Somoza of Nicaragua. Towards the end of his rule, his relationship with the United States deteriorated.

Trujillo encouraged foreign investment in the Dominican Republic, particularly from Americans. He gave a concession with mineral rights in the Azua Basin to Clem S. Clarke, an oilman from Shreveport, Louisiana.

=== Hull–Trujillo Treaty ===
Early on, Trujillo determined that Dominican financial affairs had to be put in order, and that included ending the United States' role as collector of Dominican customs—a situation that had existed since 1907 and was confirmed in a 1924 convention signed at the end of the occupation.

Negotiations started in 1936 and lasted four years. On 24 September 1940, Trujillo and the American Secretary of State Cordell Hull signed the Hull–Trujillo Treaty, whereby the United States relinquished control over the collection and application of customs revenues, and the Dominican Republic committed to deposit consolidated government revenues in a special bank account to guarantee repayment of foreign debt. The government was free to set custom duties with no restrictions.

This diplomatic success gave Trujillo the occasion to launch a massive propaganda campaign that presented him as the savior of the nation. A law proclaimed that the Benefactor was also now the Restaurador de la independencia financiera de la Republica (Restorer of the Republic's financial independence).

=== Haiti ===
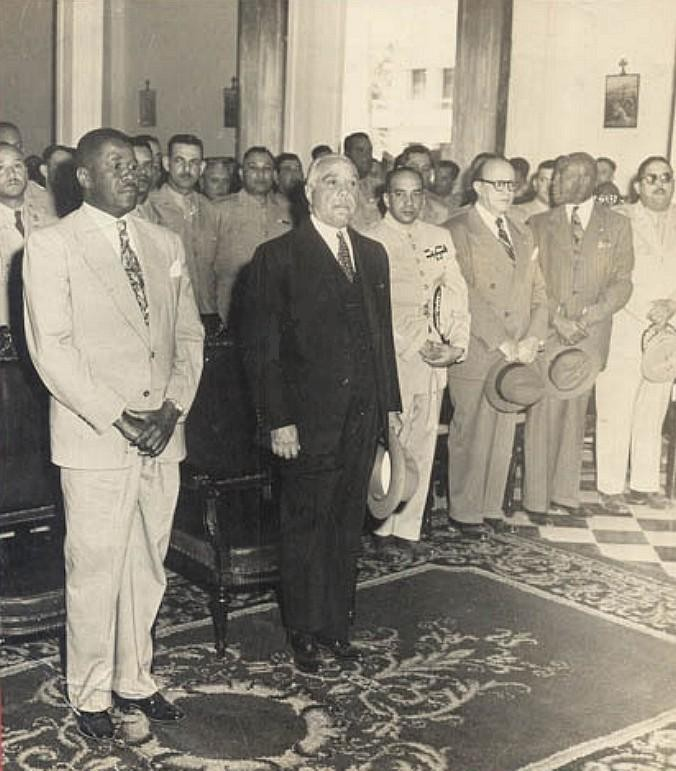
Trujillo with President Paul Magloire of Haiti. Hector and Ramfis Trujillo in attendance

Haiti formerly occupied what is today called the Dominican Republic for 22 years – from 1822 to 1844. Prior to their occupation, Spanish colonial rule prevailed. Encroachment by Haiti was an ongoing process, and when Trujillo took over, specifically the northwestern border region had become increasingly "Haitianized". The border was poorly defined. In 1933, and again in 1935, Trujillo met the Haitian President Sténio Vincent to settle the border issue. By 1936, they reached and signed a settlement. At the same time, Trujillo plotted against the Haitian government by linking up with General Calixte, Commander of the Garde d'Haiti, and Élie Lescot, at that time the Haitian ambassador in Ciudad Trujillo (Santo Domingo). After the settlement, when further border incursions occurred, Trujillo initiated the Parsley Massacre.

==== Parsley massacre ====
Known as La Masacre del Perejil in Spanish, the massacre was started by Trujillo in October 1937. Claiming that Haiti was harboring his former Dominican opponents, he ordered an attack on the border. Tens of thousands of Haitians were murdered as they tried to escape. The number of dead is estimated to be 12,000–30,000. (Note: Crassweller mentions those estimates and adds that, "A figure of 15,000 to 20,000 would be reasonable, but this is guesswork.") (Note: Roorda mentions 12,000 as a likely figure.) (Note: "anyone of African descent found incapable of pronouncing correctly, that is, to the complete satisfaction of the sadistic examiners, became a condemned individual. This killing is recorded as having a death toll reaching thirty thousand innocent souls, Haitians as well as Dominicans.") The Dominican military used machetes to murder and decapitate many of the victims; they also took people to the port of Montecristi, where many victims were thrown into the sea to drown with their hands and feet bound.

The Haitian response was muted, but its government eventually called for an international investigation. Under pressure from the US government, Trujillo agreed to a reparation settlement in January 1938 of US$750,000. By the next year, the amount had been reduced to US$525,000 (US$11.76 million in 2025); 30 dollars per victim, of which only two cents were given to survivors because of corruption in the Haitian bureaucracy.

In 1941, Lescot, who had received financial support from Trujillo, succeeded Vincent as President of Haiti. Trujillo expected that Lescot would be his puppet, but Lescot turned against him. Trujillo unsuccessfully tried to assassinate him in a 1944 plot and then published their correspondence to discredit him. Lescot fled into exile in 1946 after demonstrations against him.

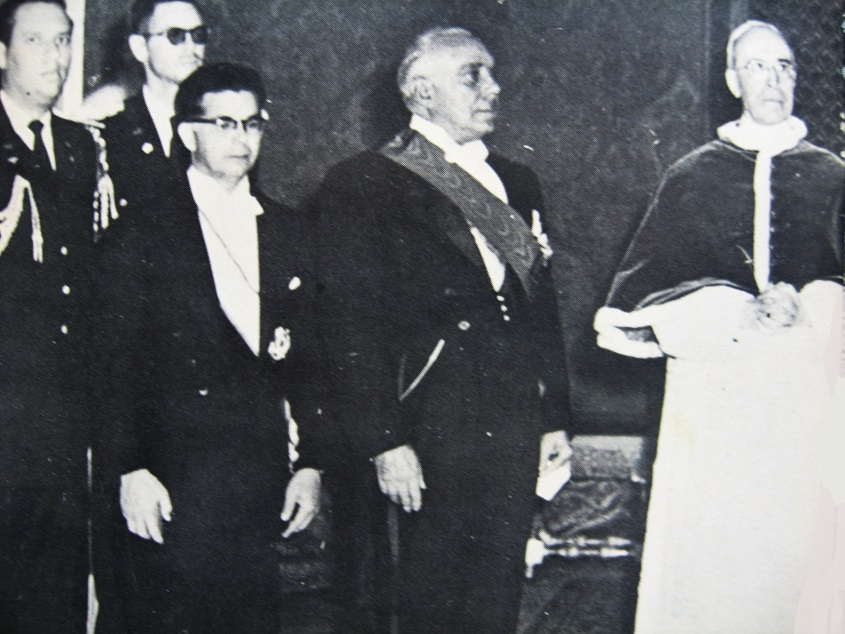
Trujillo and Joaquín Balaguer being received in audience by Pope Pius XII in 1955

=== Cuba ===
In 1947, Dominican exiles, including Juan Bosch, had concentrated in Cuba. With the approval and support of Cuba's government, led by Ramón Grau, an expeditionary force was trained with the intention of invading the Dominican Republic and overthrowing Trujillo. However, international pressure, including from the United States, made the exiles abort the expedition. In turn, when Fulgencio Batista was in power, Trujillo initially supported anti-Batista supporters of Carlos Prío Socarrás in Oriente Province in 1955. However, weapons Trujillo sent were soon inherited by Fidel Castro's insurgents when Prío allied with Castro.

After 1956, when Trujillo saw that Castro was gaining ground, he started to support Batista with money, planes, equipment, and men. Trujillo, convinced that Batista would prevail, was very surprised when Batista showed up as a fugitive after he had been ousted. Trujillo kept Batista until August 1959 as a "virtual prisoner". Only after paying US$3–4 million could Batista leave for Portugal, which had granted him a visa. Castro made threats to overthrow Trujillo, and Trujillo responded by increasing the budget for national defense. A foreign legion was formed with recruits from the Mediterranean, and after a series of imprisonments and mutinies, the ranks were filled with Cuban émigrés and Dominican volunteers.

A Cuban plane with 56 fighting men landed near Constanza, Dominican Republic, on Sunday, 14 June 1959, and six days later more invaders brought by two yachts landed at the north coast. The Dominican Armed Forces defeated the small-scale air-sea invasion, killing 217 of the 224 invaders and capturing the remaining seven. In turn, in August 1959, Johnny Abbes attempted to support an anti-Castro group near Trinidad, Cuba. The attempt, however, was thwarted when Cuban troops surprised a plane he had sent when it was unloading its cargo at Trinidad airport.

=== United States ===
During the Trujillo dictatorship, the Dominican Republic conducted an active foreign policy in the Eastern United States aimed at suppressing opposition. Dominican intelligence agents in the 1950s monitored, harassed, and sometimes murdered anti-Trujillo dissidents in New York, while also using front organizations, propaganda, and recruitment of U.S. citizens to influence opinion and limit criticism of the regime. These actions were documented by the U.S. State Department as interference in American society.

=== Betancourt assassination attempt ===
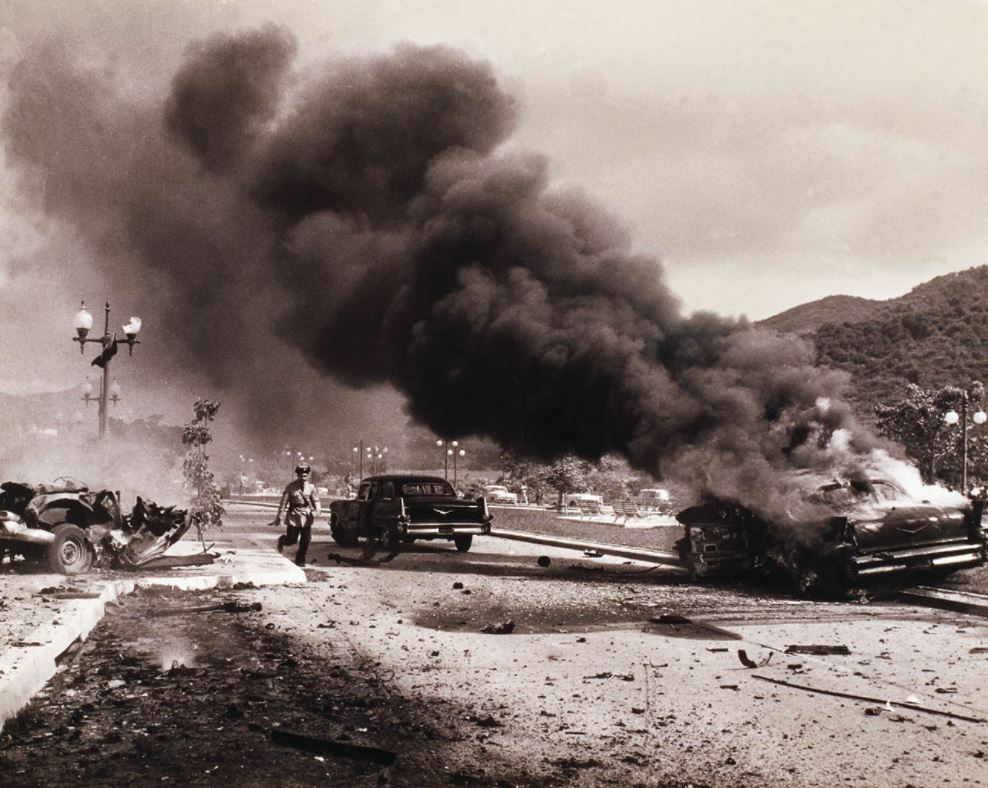
Explosion in Paseo Los Próceres during the attempted assassination of Betancourt, 24 June 1960

By the late 1950s, opposition to Trujillo's regime was starting to build to a fever pitch, especially among a younger generation who had no memory of the poverty and instability that had preceded the dictatorship. Many clamored for democratization. The Trujillo regime responded with greater repression. The Military Intelligence Service (SIM) secret police, led by Johnny Abbes, remained as ubiquitous as before. Other nations ostracized the Dominican Republic, compounding the dictator's paranoia.

Trujillo began to interfere more and more in the domestic affairs of neighboring countries. He expressed great contempt for Venezuela's president Rómulo Betancourt; an established and outspoken opponent of Trujillo, Betancourt associated with Dominicans who had plotted against the dictator. Trujillo developed an obsessive personal hatred of Betancourt and supported numerous plots by Venezuelan exiles to overthrow him. This pattern of intervention led the Venezuelan government to take its case against Trujillo to the Organization of American States (OAS), a move that infuriated Trujillo, who oversaw the testing of two radio‑controlled car bombs on his estate before a third bomb was sent to Venezuela and planted in a parked car along Betancourt's motorcade route. The assassination attempt, carried out on Friday, 24 June 1960, injured but did not kill the Venezuelan president.

The Betancourt incident inflamed world opinion against Trujillo. Outraged OAS members voted unanimously to sever diplomatic relations with his government and impose economic sanctions on the Dominican Republic. The brutal murder on Friday, 25 November 1960, of the three Mirabal sisters, Patria, María Teresa and Minerva, who opposed Trujillo's dictatorship, further increased discontent with his repressive rule. The dictator had become an embarrassment to the United States, and relations became especially strained after the Betancourt incident.

== Personal life ==
Trujillo's "central arch" was his thirst for power, coupled with an intense desire for money, which he recognised as a source of and support for power. Up at four in the morning, he exercised, studied the newspaper, read many reports, and completed papers before breakfast. At the office by nine, he continued his work, and took lunch by noon. After a walk, he continued to work until 7:30 pm. After dinner, he attended functions, held discussions, or was driven around incognito in the city "observing and remembering." Until Santo Domingo's National Palace was built in 1947, he worked out of the Casas Reales, the colonial-era Viceregal center of administration. Today the building is a museum; on display are his desk and chair, along with a massive collection of arms and armor that he bought. He was methodical, punctual, secretive, and guarded; he had no true friends, only associates and acquaintances. For his associates, his actions towards them were unpredictable.

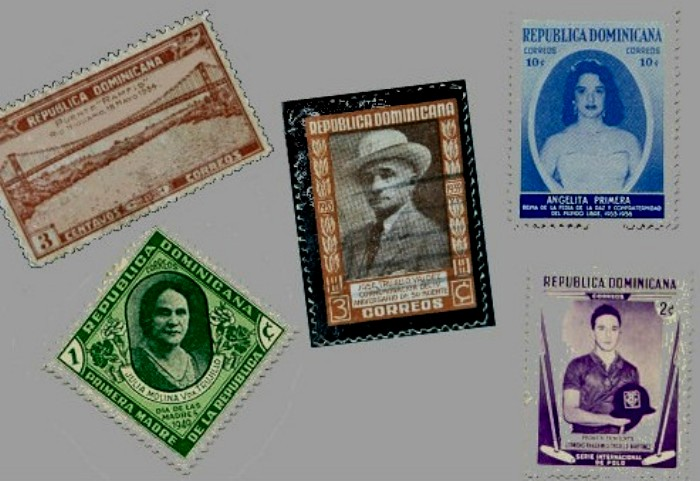
Postage stamps honoring family members

Trujillo and his family amassed enormous wealth. He acquired cattle lands on a grand scale, and went into meat and milk production, operations that soon evolved into monopolies. Salt, sugar, tobacco, lumber, and the lottery were other industries which he or his family members dominated. Family members also received positions within the government and the army, including one of Trujillo's sons who was made a colonel in the Dominican Army when he was only four years old. (Note: Decree of 18 April 1933.) (Note: In 1935, Ramfis, then aged 6, was promoted to general.) Two of Trujillo's brothers, Héctor and José Arismendy, also held positions in his government. José Arismendy Trujillo oversaw the creation of the main radio station, La Voz Dominicana, and later the television station, the fourth in the Caribbean.

By 1937 Trujillo's annual income was about $1.5 million ($34 million in 2025); at the time of his death the state took over 111 Trujillo-owned companies. His love of fine and ostentatious clothing was displayed in elaborate uniforms and suits, of which he collected almost two thousand. Fond of neckties, he amassed a collection of over 10,000. Trujillo doused himself with perfume and liked gossip.

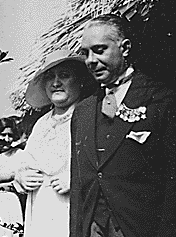
Trujillo with his second wife, Bienvenida, in 1934

Trujillo was married three times and kept other women as mistresses. His sexual appetite was rapacious, and was said to have preferred mulatta women with full bodies. On 13 August 1913, Trujillo married Aminta Ledesma Lachapelle, with whom he had 2 daughters, Julia, who died as an infant, and Flor de Oro, who died of lung cancer in 1978. On 30 March 1927, Trujillo married Bienvenida Ricardo Martínez, a woman from Monte Cristi and the daughter of Buenaventura Ricardo Heureaux. A year later he met María de los Angeles Martínez Alba (nicknamed "la españolita", or "the little Spanish girl"), and had an affair with her. He divorced Bienvenida in 1935 and married Martínez. A year later he had a daughter with Bienvenida, named Odette Trujillo Ricardo.

Trujillo's three children with María Martínez were Rafael Leónidas Ramfis, who was born on 5 June 1929, María de los Ángeles del Sagrado Corazón de Jesús (Angelita), born in Paris on 10 June 1939, and Leónidas Rhadamés, born on 1 December 1942. Ramfis and Rhadamés were named after characters in Giuseppe Verdi's opera Aida.

In 1937, Trujillo met Lina Lovatón Pittaluga, an upper-class debutante with whom he had two children, Yolanda in 1939, and Rafael, born on 20 June 1943.

In spite of Trujillo's indifference to the game of baseball, the dictator invited many black American players to the Dominican Republic, where they received good pay for playing on first-class, un-segregated teams. The great Negro league star Satchel Paige pitched for the Dragones de Ciudad Trujillo, a team organised by Trujillo. Paige later claimed, jokingly, that his guards positioned themselves "like a firing squad" to encourage him to pitch well. Los Dragones won the 1937 Dominican championship at Estadio Trujillo in Ciudad Trujillo.

Trujillo was energetic and fit. He was generally quite healthy but suffered from chronic lower urinary infections and, later, prostate problems. In 1934, Georges Marion was called from Paris to perform three urologic procedures on Trujillo.

Over time Trujillo acquired numerous homes. His favourite was Casa Caobas, on Estancia Fundacion near San Cristóbal. He also used Estancia Ramfis (which, after 1953, became the Foreign Office), Estancia Rhadames, and a home at Playa de Najayo. Less frequently he stayed at places he owned in Santiago de los Caballeros, Constanza, La Cumbre, San José de las Matas, and elsewhere. He maintained a penthouse at the Embajador Hotel in the capital.

While Trujillo was nominally a Roman Catholic, his devotion was limited to a perfunctory role in public affairs; he placed faith in local folk religion.

He was popularly known as "El Jefe" ("The Chief") or "El Benefactor" ("The Benefactor") but was privately referred to as Chapitas ("Bottlecaps") because of his indiscriminate wearing of medals. Dominican children emulated Trujillo by constructing toy medals from bottle caps.

== Assassination ==
On 30 May 1961, Trujillo was shot dead when his blue 1957 Chevrolet Bel Air was ambushed on a road outside the Dominican capital. The ambush was plotted by Salvador Estrella Sadhalá, General Juan Tomás Díaz, Pedro Livio Cedeño, Antonio de la Maza, Amado García Guerrero and General Antonio Imbert Barrera.

=== Aftermath ===
The plotters failed to take control, as the later-executed General José René Román Fernández ("Pupo Román") betrayed his co-conspirators by his inactivity, and contingency plans had not been made. On the other side, Johnny Abbes, Roberto Figueroa Carrión, and the Trujillo family put the SIM to work to hunt the members of the plot and brought back Ramfis Trujillo from Paris to succeed his father. The response by the SIM was swift and brutal. Hundreds of suspects were detained, many tortured. On 18 November the last executions took place when six of the conspirators were executed in the "Hacienda María Massacre". Imbert was the only one of the seven assassins who survived the manhunt. A co-conspirator named Luis Amiama Tio, who was not present at the assassination, also survived, allegedly hiding in a closet of the Minister of Social Affairs.

US President John F. Kennedy learned of Trujillo's death during a diplomatic meeting with French President Charles de Gaulle.

Trujillo's funeral featured a long procession ending in his hometown of San Cristóbal, where his body was first buried. Dominican President Joaquín Balaguer gave the eulogy. The efforts of the Trujillo family to keep control of the country ultimately failed. The military uprising on 19 November of the Rebellion of the Pilots and the threat of US intervention set the final stage and ended the Trujillo regime. Ramfis tried to flee with his father's body aboard his boat Angelita, but was turned back. Balaguer allowed Ramfis to leave the country and to take his father's body to Paris. There, the remains were interred in the Cimetière du Père Lachaise on 14 August 1964, and six years later moved to Spain, to the Mingorrubio Cemetery in El Pardo on the north side of Madrid.

=== United States' involvement ===
The role of the United States' Central Intelligence Agency in the killing has been debated. Imbert insisted that the plotters acted on their own. However, Trujillo was certainly assassinated with weapons supplied by the CIA. In a 1975 report to the Deputy Attorney General of the United States, CIA officials described the agency as having "no active part" in the assassination and only a "faint connection" with the groups that planned the killing.

US involvement appears to go deeper than supplying weapons. In the 1950s, the CIA gave José Figueres Ferrer money to publish a political journal, Combate, and to found a left-wing school for opposition leaders in other countries in the Americas. Funds passed from a shell foundation to the Jacob Merrill Kaplan Fund; then to the Institute of International Labor Research (IILR) headed by Norman Thomas, six-time US presidential candidate for the Socialist Party of America; and finally to Figueres, Sacha Volman, and Juan Bosch. Sacha Volman, treasurer of the IILR, was a CIA agent.

Cord Meyer was a CIA official responsible for manipulating international groups. He used the contacts with Bosch, Volman, and Figueres for a new purpose, as the United States moved to rally the Western Hemisphere against Cuba's Fidel Castro, Trujillo had become expendable. Dissidents inside the Dominican Republic argued that assassination was the only certain way to remove Trujillo.

According to Chester Bowles, the Undersecretary of State, internal Department of State discussions in 1961 on the topic were vigorous. Richard N. Goodwin, Assistant Special Counsel to the President, who had direct contacts with the rebel alliance, argued for intervention against Trujillo. Quoting Bowles directly: "The next morning I learned that in spite of the clear decision against having the dissident group request our assistance Dick Goodwin following the meeting sent a cable to CIA people in the Dominican Republic without checking with State or CIA; indeed, with the protest of the Department of State. The cable directed the CIA people in the Dominican Republic to get this request at any cost. When Allen Dulles found this out the next morning, he withdrew the order. We later discovered it had already been carried out."

An internal CIA memorandum states that a 1973 Office of Inspector General investigation into the murder disclosed "quite extensive Agency involvement with the plotters." The CIA described its role in "changing" the government of the Dominican Republic "as a 'success' in that it assisted in moving the Dominican Republic from a totalitarian dictatorship to a Western-style democracy."

Juan Bosch, the earlier recipient of CIA funding, was elected president of the Dominican Republic in 1962 and was deposed in 1963.

Even after the death of Trujillo, the unusual events continued. In November 1961, Mexican police found a corpse they identified as Luis Melchior Vidal Jr., godson of Trujillo. Vidal was the unofficial business agent of the Dominican Republic while Trujillo was in power. Under the cover of the American Sucrose Company and the Paint Company of America, Vidal had teamed up with the US-American Joel David Kaplan to operate as arms merchants for the CIA.

Joel David Kaplan was the nephew of the previously mentioned Jacob Merrill Kaplan. The older Kaplan earned his fortune primarily through operations in Cuba and the Dominican Republic.

In 1962, the younger Kaplan was convicted of killing Vidal, in Mexico City. He was sentenced to 28 years in prison. Kaplan escaped from a Mexican prison using a helicopter. The dramatic event was the basis for the Charles Bronson action film Breakout.

The Mexican police requested for the FBI to arrest and remand Joel Kaplan on 20 August 1971. Kaplan's attorney claimed that Kaplan was a CIA agent. Neither the FBI nor the US Department of Justice has pursued the issue. The Mexican government never initiated extradition proceedings against Kaplan.

== Honors and awards ==
- Legion d'honneur
- Order of the Holy Sepulchre of Jerusalem

== In media ==
Media type	Title	Release date	Details
Book	Trujillo: The Little Caesar of the Caribbean	1958	Authored by Germán Ornes Coiscou, this book reveals the terror of Trujillo's dictatorship as it became a cancerous growth infecting generations of Dominicans for more than 30 years.
Book	The Terrible Ones	1966	Authored by Valerie Moolman, the book describes the attempts of The Terrible Ones (the widows of murdered Trujillo opponents), Cuban fidelistas and Chinese communist forces to locate and recover US$100 million in gold and precious stones accumulated by Trujillo during his dictatorship.
Book	The Day of the Jackal	1971	Authored by Frederick Forsyth, the book fictitiously attributes "credit" for this assassination to the titular assassin. An English arms dealer, suspected of being "the Jackal", had a meeting with Trujillo's chief of police in Ciudad Trujillo on 30 May 1961, trying to sell the police British surplus submachine guns. However, Trujillo is assassinated that same day, and the arms dealer is forced to flee the Dominican Republic.
Film	The Day of the Jackal	1973	Directed by Fred Zinnemann, the film, like the book of the same title, fictitiously attributes "credit" for this assassination to its titular assassin.
Book	Memorias de un Cortesano de la Era de Trujillo	1988	Authored by Joaquín Balaguer, the last puppet president of the Dominican Republic appointed by Trujillo, in 1960, and who went on to rule in his own right for most of the period 1966–1996.
Book	La era de Trujillo: un estudio casuístico de dictadura hispanoamericana	1990	Manuel Vazquez Montalbán, a Catalan writer, wrote about Galíndez en 1990. The book is a fictional recreation of the life and disappearance of the diplomat.
Book	In the Time of the Butterflies	1994	Authored by Julia Alvarez, the book describes the lives of the four Mirabal Sisters, who lived under Trujillo's regime; three of them eventually were killed after joining the resistance against his rule.
Documentary	El Poder del Jefe I	1994	Directed by René Fortunato
Documentary	Ken Burns Baseball	1994	Winning the Dominican National Championship with Satchel Paige and Josh Gibson discussed in Inning Five: Shadow Ball.
TV film	Soul of the Game	1996	Brief appearance during a baseball game in Santo Domingo.
Documentary	El Poder del Jefe II	1996	Directed by René Fortunato
Documentary	El Poder del Jefe III	1998	Directed by René Fortunato
Book	The Feast of the Goat	2000	A book by Mario Vargas Llosa, set in the Dominican Republic and portraying the assassination of the Dominican dictator, and its aftermath, from two distinct standpoints a generation apart: during and immediately after the assassination itself, in May 1961; and thirty-five years later, in 1996.
TV film	In the Time of the Butterflies	2001	Directed by Mariano Barroso and Trujillo played by Edward James Olmos. Based on the novel by Julia Alvarez (1994) about the regime assassination of the dissident Mirabal sisters.
Book	Before We Were Free	2002	Julia Alvarez, a Dominican-American writer, wrote this young-adult novel about Anita, a twelve-year-old girl in the Dominican Republic in 1960, who realizes that life under the reign of Trujillo is much darker and more dangerous than she had previously known.
Film	El Misterio Galíndez – The Galindez File	2003	Gerardo Herrero directed El Misterio Galíndez, a movie about Jesús de Galíndez Suárez, activist of the PNV party and Basque diplomat who disappeared in 1956; allegedly because of his opposition to Trujillo's regime.
Film	The Feast of the Goat (*)	2006	Directed by Luis Llosa and Trujillo played by Tomás Milián
Book	The Brief Wondrous Life of Oscar Wao	2007	Junot Díaz, a Santo Domingo-born American, wrote this Pulitzer Prize–winning book about a Dominican-American family. The book is a fictional account of the family's misfortunes interwoven with a recounting of the atrocities of Trujillo's regime, some of which are indirectly linked to the family's fate, following them like a curse or fukú across the generations.
Film	Code Name: Butterflies	2009	Directed by Cecilia Domeyko. Film about the life and death of the Mirabal sisters with interviews with people involved, and recreations of key events.
Film	Trópico de Sangre	2010	Directed by Juan Delancer and Trujillo played by Juan Fernández de Alarcon. The film focuses on Minerva Mirabal and tells the true story of how she and her sisters dared to stand up against dictator Rafael Trujillo and were assassinated in 1960 as a result. The film further details how this crime led to the assassination of Trujillo.
Book	Pilar Ramirez and the Escape from Zafa	2022	Authored by Julian Randall in 2022, a children's fantasy novel centered on research about a long lost cousin who disappeared in the Dominican Republic 50 years ago during the Trujillato. Interspersed with Dominican myths and legends, while incorporating historical events of the Trujillato and the murder of the Mirabal sisters.
Book	The Ogre's Daughter	2024	Authored by French novelist Catherine Bardon in 2022 and published in Tina Kover's English translation by Europa Editions, this is a fictionalized life of Trujillo's eldest surviving daughter Flor de Oro.

== Explanatory notes ==
Political offices
Preceded by Rafael Estrella (acting)	President of the Dominican Republic; 1930–1938	Succeeded by Jacinto Bienvenido Peynado
Preceded by Manuel de Jesús Troncoso de la Concha	President of the Dominican Republic; 1942–1952	Succeeded by Héctor Trujillo
