= Social Christian Reformist Party =

Christian democratic party in the Dominican Republic

Social Christian Reformist Party Partido Reformista Social Cristiano
- Abbreviation: PRSC
- President: Quique Antún
- General Secretary: Ramón Rogelio Genao
- Presidium: Ricardo Espaillat
- Spokesperson: Máximo Castro
- Founder: Joaquín Balaguer
- Founded: July 24, 1984; 42 years ago
- Merger of: Reformist Party; Social Christian Revolutionary Party
- Preceded by: Red Party (self-declared)
- Headquarters: Santo Domingo
- Ideology: Reformism; Christian democracy Conservatism
- Political position: Centre-right
- International affiliation: Centrist Democrat International; International Democrat Union (formerly)
- Regional affiliation: Christian Democrat Organization of America; Union of Latin American Parties
- Colours: Red, green and white
- Slogan: Ni injusticias, ni privilegios ("No injustices, no privileges")
- Anthem: "Himno del Partido Reformista Social Cristiano" "(Hymn of Social Christian Reformist Party)"
- Chamber of Deputies: 1 / 190
- Senate: 1 / 32
- Mayors: 7 / 161
- Central American Parliament: 0 / 20

Website
- prsc.com.do

The Social Christian Reformist Party (Spanish: Partido Reformista Social Cristiano, PRSC) is a Christian democratic political party in the Dominican Republic. It was established on July 24, 1984, by the union of Joaquín Balaguer's Partido Reformista and the Partido Revolucionario Social Cristiano. Some of the PRSC's founders and leaders were originally business leaders and Roman Catholics who opposed the communist, socialist, and social democratic tendencies of Juan Bosch, the Dominican Revolutionary Party (PRD) and the Dominican Liberation Party (PLD).

The PRSC is strongly associated with Balaguer, who was the presidential candidate of the PRSC and its predecessor party in all but one election between 1966 and 2000. The party was often in power during this period, but declined rapidly following Balaguer's death in 2002. After the mid-2000s the party was relegated to being a junior partner of the PRD or PLD, and ceased running a presidential candidate in 2012.

The PRSC was in an alliance with the People's Force party in the 2020 presidential elections, and won six seats in the senate and six in the chamber of deputies.

== Background and formation ==
Long-time politician Joaquín Balaguer was the last figurehead president of Rafael Trujillo's dictatorship (1930–1961) in the Dominican Republic. Following Trujillo's assassination, Balaguer struggled to enact reforms and repair international relations while preventing the country from sliding into civil war between the communists and the trujillistas. Balaguer headed an internationally recognized caretaker Council of State in 1962 but resigned when the military opened fire upon demonstrators. A military coup d'état followed and Balaguer went into exile.

Juan Bosch became the first freely elected president in 1962, but was overthrown several months later in a military coup, and by 1965 the country fell into civil war. Balaguer created the Reformist Party (Spanish: Partido Reformista) and returned with the backing of the United States (which occupied the country) for the 1966 general election.

The Reformist Party's ideology and doctrine was largely undefined, following Balaguer's orders. Balaguer campaigned as a moderate conservative, advocating gradual reforms. The party, which was anti-communist, remained in power through three presidential terms (1966–1978) known domestically as "The Twelve Years".

After falling from power in the 1978 elections, Balaguer sought to integrate Christian democratic theory into the party, and consulted with the Venezuelan Social Christian Party. In 1985, the Reformists merged with the Social Christian Revolutionary Party (Partido Revolucionario Social Cristiano, PRSC), which had lost official party eligibility due to poor performance in the 1978 elections. The PRSC had been founded in 1962 by a group of exiles that included Alfonso Moreno Martinez, Mario Read Vittini, and Caonabo Javier Castillo.

== History and policies ==
The new party was named the Social Christian Reformist Party (Partido Reformista Social Cristiano, also PRSC). It was dominated by Balaguer's personality and lacked a coherent strategy or philosophy other than his conservative tendencies.

The party won the presidency and both houses of Congress in 1986, and more modest victories in 1990 and 1994.

The PRSC declined rapidly following Balaguer's death in 2002. After the mid-2000s the party was relegated to being a junior partner of the Dominican Revolutionary Party (PRD) or the Dominican Liberation Party (PLD).

The party formed an alliance with the Modern Revolutionary Party, the Grand National Alliance and others for the 2006 elections, taking a distant third place. The party supported the Dominican Municipal League candidate in the 2008 presidential election, who came in a distant third place with less than 5% of the votes.

In the 2010 legislative elections, the party had a partial alliance with the PLD in almost all provinces and won 4 senators (3 within the alliance) and 8 deputies (5 within the alliance). The PRSC supported the PLD candidate in the 2012 presidential elections, which was the first time the party did not run its own candidate.

The party allied with the People's Force party in the 2020 elections.

The PRSC has attempted to reorganize itself with internal party discipline, reforming its management bodies, recruiting younger people, and attempting to expand its direct enrolment.

== List of party presidents ==
1. Joaquín Balaguer (1963–2002)
2. Quique Antún (2005–2009, 2014–present)
3. Carlos Morales Troncoso (2009–2014)

== Electoral history ==
=== Presidential elections ===
Election	Party candidate	Votes	%	Result
1966	Joaquín Balaguer	775,805	57.7%	Elected ✓
1970	Joaquín Balaguer	707,136	57.2%	Elected ✓
1974	Joaquín Balaguer	942,726	84.7%	Elected ✓
1978	Joaquín Balaguer	711,878	43.0%	Lost ✗
1982	Joaquín Balaguer	706,951	38.6%	Lost ✗
1986	Joaquín Balaguer	877,378	41.6%	Elected ✓
1990	Joaquín Balaguer	678,065	35.35%	Elected ✓
1994	Joaquín Balaguer	1,275,460	43.3%	Elected ✓
1996	Jacinto Peynado Garrigosa	435,504	15.0%	Lost ✗
2000	Joaquín Balaguer	785,926	24.60%	Lost ✗
2004	Eduardo Estrella	312,493	8.7%	Lost ✗
2008	Amable Aristy	187,645	4.59%	Lost ✗
2012	Supported Danilo Medina (PLD)	2,323,150	51.21%	Elected ✓
2016	Supported Luis Abinader (PRM)	1,613,222	34.98%	Lost ✗
2020	Supported Leonel Fernández (FP)	365,212	8.90%	Lost ✗
2024	Supported Luis Abinader (PRM)	2,507,297	57.44%	Elected ✓

=== Congressional elections ===
Election	Chamber of Deputies					Senate		
Election	Votes	%	Seats	+/–	Position	Seats	+/–	Position
1966	759,889	56.4%	48 / 91	▲48	▲1st	22 / 27	▲22	▲1st
1970	653,565	52.8%	45 / 91	▼3	1st	21 / 27	▼1	1st
1974	929,112	89.8% in alliance with MNJ	86 / 91	▲26	1st	27 / 27	▲6	1st
1978	692,146	42.1%	43 / 91	▼32	▼2nd	11 / 27	▼12	▼2nd
1982	656,904	36.4%	50 / 120	▲7	2nd	10 / 27	▼1	2nd
1986	877,830	41.6% in alliance with PQD and PNVC	56 / 120	▲6	▲1st	21 / 30	▲11	▲1st
1990	663,127	34.6%	41 / 120	▼15	1st	16 / 30	▼5	1st
1994	1,160,405	39.1% in alliance with PDP	50 / 120	▲9	▼2nd	14 / 30	▼2	▼2nd
1998	351,347	16.8% in alliance with PQD	17 / 149	▼33	▼3rd	2 / 30	▼12	▼3rd
2002	556,431	24.4% in alliance with PPC	36 / 150	▲19	3rd	2 / 30	Steady	▲2nd
2006	326,893	10.93% as part of GNA	22 / 178	▼14	3rd	3 / 32	▲1	▼3rd
2010	203,729	6.15%	11 / 183	▼11	3rd	4 / 32	▲1	3rd
2016	393,125	9.16%	18 / 190	▲7	3rd	1 / 32	▼3	3rd
2020	158,890	4.09% in alliance with FP	5 / 190	▼13	▼5th	5 / 32	▲4	3rd
2024	158,890	4.09% PRSC	4 / 190	▼13	▼4th	1 / 32	▲4	3rd
