= 1982 Dominican Republic general election =

← 1978	16 May 1982	1986 →
- Presidential election
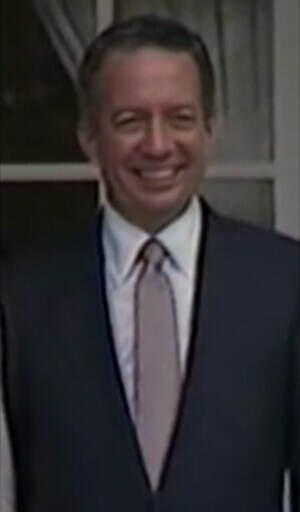

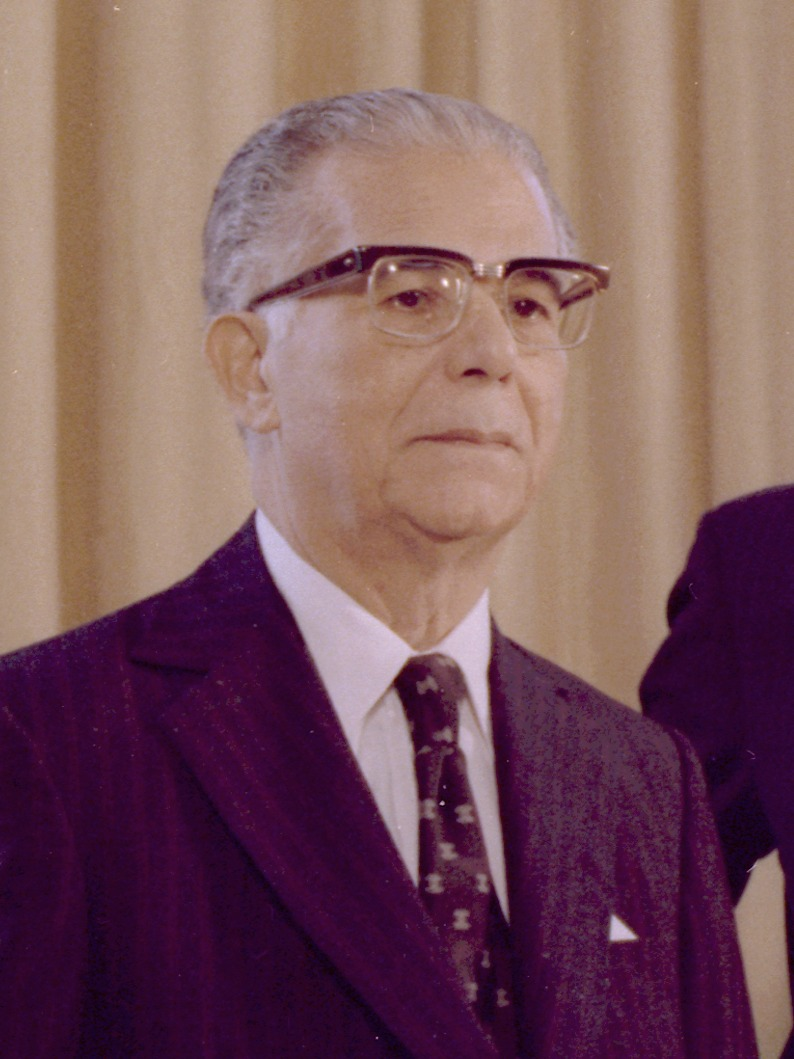

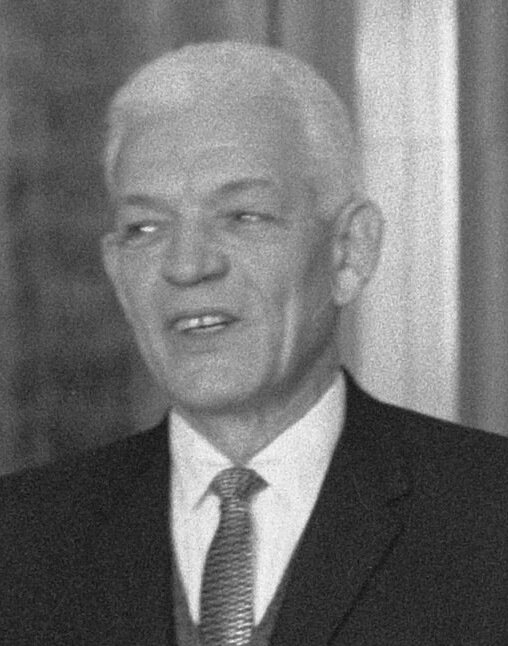
Nominee	Salvador Jorge Blanco	Joaquín Balaguer	Juan Bosch
Party	PRD	PR	PLD
Popular vote	854,868	706,951	179,849
Percentage	46.70%	38.62%	9.82%
- Results by department
President before election
Antonio Guzmán
PRD
Elected President
Salvador Jorge Blanco
PRD

General elections were held in the Dominican Republic on 16 May 1982. Salvador Jorge Blanco of the Dominican Revolutionary Party won the presidential election, whilst his party also won the parliamentary elections. Voter turnout was 73% in the presidential election and 72% in the parliamentary election. The elections were democratic, although there were incidents.

== Results ==
=== President ===
Candidate	Party	Votes	%
Salvador Jorge Blanco	Dominican Revolutionary Party	854,868	46.70
Joaquín Balaguer	Reformist Party	706,951	38.62
Juan Bosch	Dominican Liberation Party	179,849	9.82
Elías Wessin y Wessin	Democratic Quisqueyano Party	35,355	1.93
Narciso Isa Conde	Dominican Communist Party	18,481	1.01
Rafael Taveras	Anti-Imperialist Patriotic Union	15,250	0.83
José Rafael Abinader	Social Democratic Alliance	9,208	0.50
Two other candidates		10,768	0.59
Total		1,830,730	100.00
Valid votes		1,830,730	97.03
Invalid/blank votes		56,039	2.97
Total votes		1,886,769	100.00
Registered voters/turnout		2,601,684	72.52
Source: Nohlen

=== Congress ===
Party	Votes	%	Seats			
Party	Votes	%	House	+/–	Senate	+/–
Dominican Revolutionary Party	825,005	45.66	62	+14	17	+6
Reformist Party	656,904	36.36	50	+7	10	–6
Dominican Liberation Party	174,464	9.66	7	+1	0	0
Democratic Quisqueyano Party	35,185	1.95	0	0	0	0
National Civic Veterans Party	28,354	1.57	0	New	0	New
Constitutional Action Party	18,360	1.02	1	New	0	New
Anti-Imperialist Patriotic Union	12,979	0.72	0	New	0	New
Dominican Communist Party	12,101	0.67	0	0	0	0
Social Democratic Alliance	8,578	0.47	0	0	0	0
Socialist Bloc	7,917	0.44	0	New	0	New
National Civic Union	7,896	0.44	0	0	0	0
Movement for Socialism	7,193	0.40	0	New	0	New
Movement of Democratic Integration	6,886	0.38	0	0	0	0
National Action Party	3,522	0.19	0	New	0	New
Other parties	1,483	0.08	0	–	0	–
Total	1,806,827	100.00	120	+29	27	0
Valid votes	1,806,827	96.99				
Invalid/blank votes	56,039	3.01				
Total votes	1,862,866	100.00				
Registered voters/turnout	2,601,684	71.60				
Source: Nohlen
