= 1978 Dominican Republic general election =

← 1974	16 May 1978	1982 →
- Presidential election
- Turnout: 76.25%
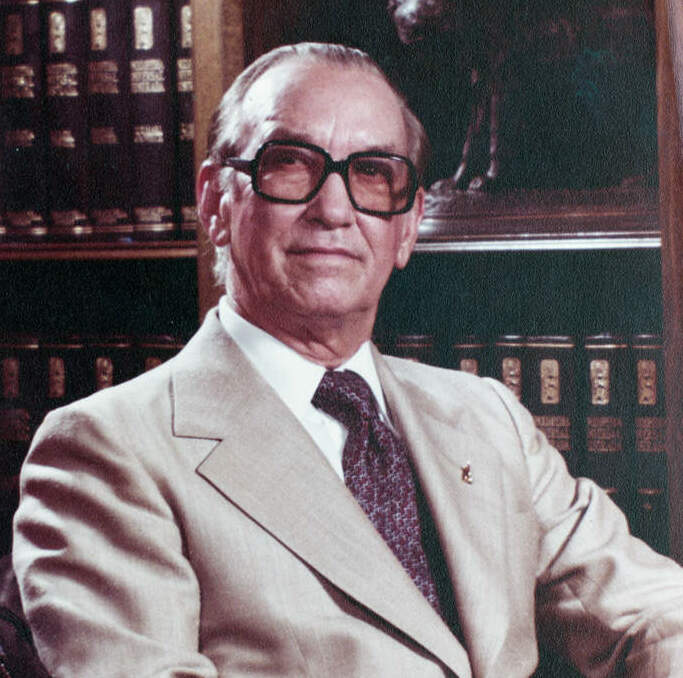

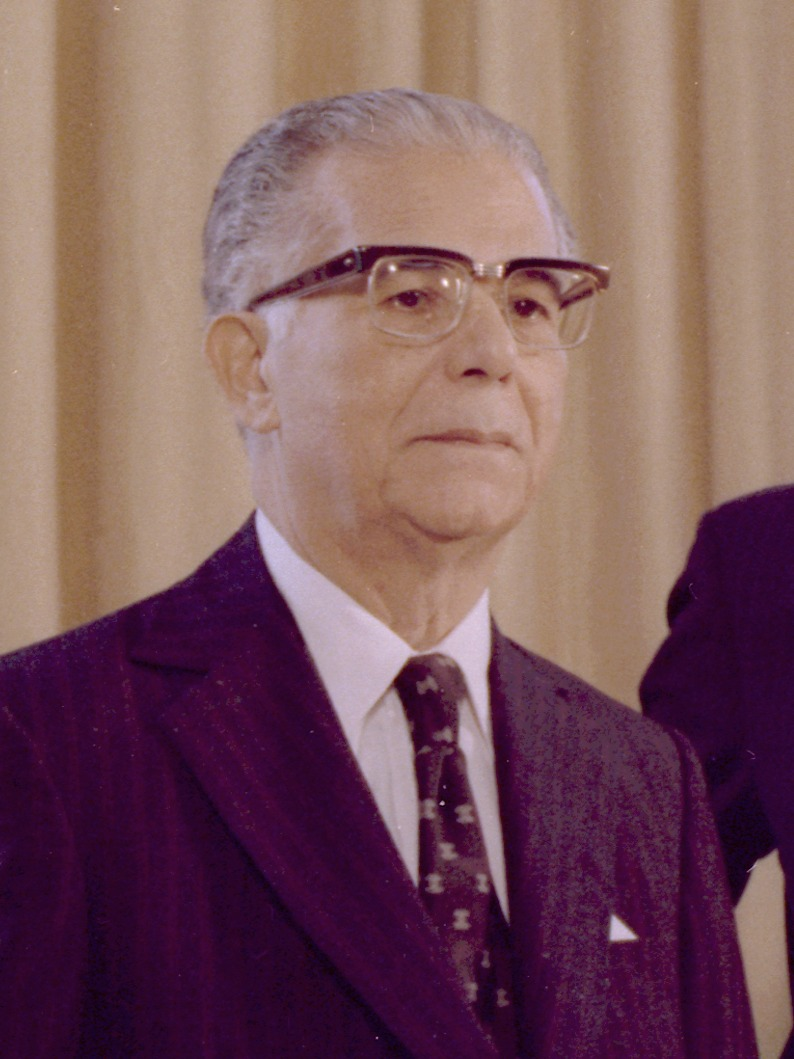
Nominee	Antonio Guzmán	Joaquín Balaguer
Party	PRD	PR
Popular vote	866,912	711,878
Percentage	52.36%	42.99%
- Results by department
President before election
Joaquín Balaguer
PR
Elected President
Antonio Guzmán
PRD

General elections were held in the Dominican Republic on 16 May 1978. Following diplomatic pressure from American President Jimmy Carter, the elections were free and competitive and contested by all political parties, unlike the previous elections in the 1970s. Antonio Guzmán Fernández won the presidential election, whilst his Dominican Revolutionary Party (which had not contested the 1970 and 1974 elections) won the Congressional elections. Voter turnout was 76%.

When counting showed an unmistakable trend toward Guzmán, the Army attempted to stage a coup in favor of incumbent Joaquín Balaguer. However, when the army tried to interrupt the vote count, it was forced to back down amid protests at home and strong pressure from abroad. The final count showed Balaguer had suffered the first defeat of his career, losing by almost 10 points. Although Guzmán was allowed to assume the presidency, the Central Elections Authority redistributed the uncast votes equally between the PRD and the Reformist Party, diminishing the PRD's majority in Congress.

Guzmán's swearing-in on 16 August marked the first time in the country's history that a sitting government had peacefully surrendered power to an elected member of the opposition.

== Results ==
=== President ===
Candidate	Party	Votes	%
Antonio Guzmán Fernández	Dominican Revolutionary Party	866,912	52.36
Joaquín Balaguer	Reformist Party	711,878	42.99
Francisco Augusto Lora	Movement of Democratic Integration	27,095	1.64
Juan Bosch	Dominican Liberation Party	18,375	1.11
Narciso Isa Conde	Dominican Communist Party	9,828	0.59
Alfonso Lockward	Social Christian Revolutionary Party	7,981	0.48
Luis Julián Pérez	National Salvation Movement	7,782	0.47
Luis Homero Lajara Burgos	People's Democratic Party	5,956	0.36
Total		1,655,807	100.00
Valid votes		1,655,807	95.09
Invalid/blank votes		85,530	4.91
Total votes		1,741,337	100.00
Registered voters/turnout		2,283,784	76.25
Source: Nohlen

=== Congress ===
Party	Votes	%	Seats			
Party	Votes	%	House	+/–	Senate	+/–
Dominican Revolutionary Party	838,973	50.98	48	New	16	New
Reformist Party	692,146	42.06	43	–32	11	–12
Dominican Liberation Party	18,565	1.13	0	New	0	New
Movement of Democratic Integration	13,317	0.81	0	New	0	New
National Civic Union	13,316	0.81	0	New	0	New
Social Christian Revolutionary Party	11,094	0.67	0	New	0	New
Social Democratic Alliance	11,056	0.67	0	New	0	New
Dominican Communist Party	10,751	0.65	0	New	0	New
Movement of National Reconciliation	7,743	0.47	0	New	0	New
National Salvation Movement	7,727	0.47	0	New	0	New
Democratic Quisqueyano Party	5,984	0.36	0	New	0	New
People's Democratic Party	5,667	0.34	0	–3	0	0
Revolutionary Movement of the People	3,867	0.23	0	New	0	New
Independent Provincial Union Movement	1,998	0.12	0	New	0	New
Justicialist Popular Movement	1,649	0.10	0	New	0	New
Santuagúes Restoration Movement	1,428	0.09	0	New	0	New
Municipal Movement of the People	284	0.02	0	–1	0	0
Total	1,645,565	100.00	91	0	27	0
Valid votes	1,645,565	95.06				
Invalid/blank votes	85,530	4.94				
Total votes	1,731,095	100.00				
Registered voters/turnout	2,283,784	75.80				
Source: Nohlen, Campillo Pérez
