= 1986 Dominican Republic general election =

Election in the Dominican Republic

- 16 May 1986
- Presidential election
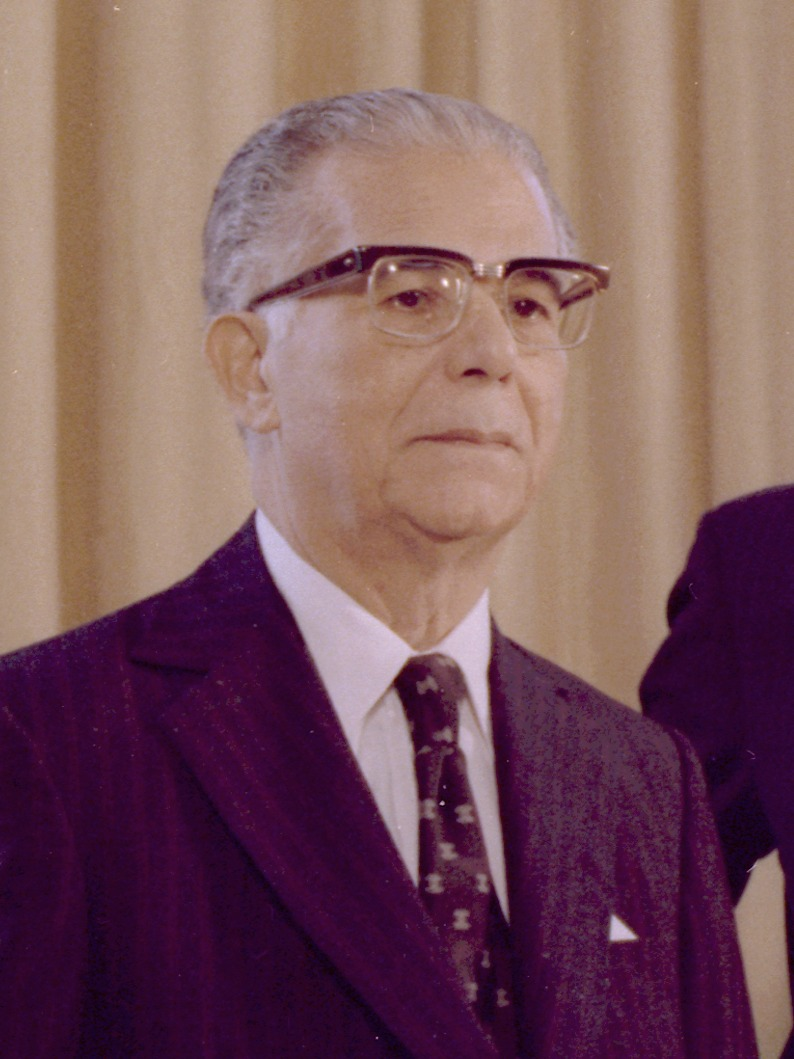

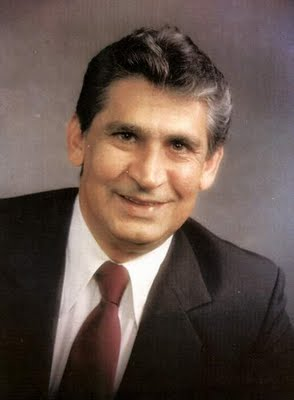

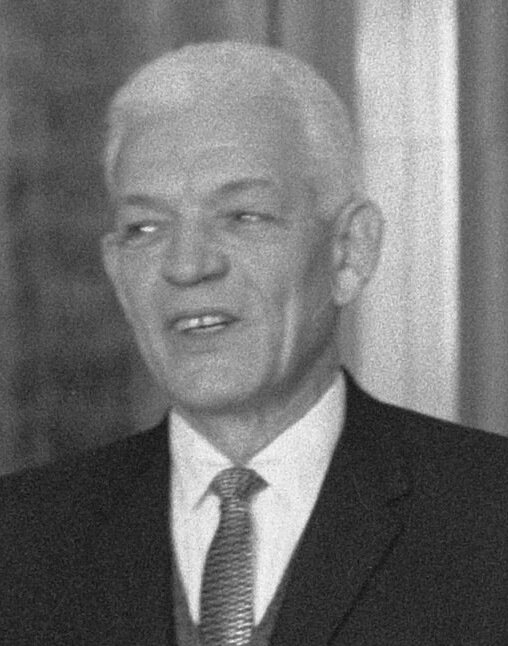
Nominee	Joaquín Balaguer	Jacobo Majluta	Juan Bosch
Party	PRSC	PRD	PLD
Popular vote	877,378	828,209	378,881
Percentage	41.53%	39.20%	17.93%
- Results by department
President before election
Salvador Jorge Blanco
PRD
Elected President
Joaquín Balaguer
PRSC

General elections were held in the Dominican Republic on 16 May 1986. Joaquín Balaguer of the Social Christian Reformist Party (PRSC) won the presidential election, whilst the PRSC-led alliance won the Congressional elections. Voter turnout was 72%.

== Presidential candidates ==
The incumbent Salvador Jorge Blanco was standing down after a four-year term. Although he was constitutionally allowed to run for a second term, his Dominican Revolutionary Party had a strict anti-re-election ideology.

=== Dominican Revolutionary Party ===
Since the PRD had a strict anti-re-election stance, it was assumed that Jacobo Majluta was next in line for his party's nomination. Majluta was vice president under Antonio Guzmán Fernández and had served as president for 43 days after Guzmán committed suicide. After having been defeated by Jorge Blanco for the nomination in 1982, he was given the candidacy for Santo Domingo Senator and President of the Senate (a similar deal had been done by Blanco and Guzmán in 1978) which he won. From this position he engaged a fierce battle with the faction of the party led by Blanco and so the latter tried putting Secretary of State Hatuey Decamps against Majluta for the nomination but someone so close to the unpopular government could not stop Majluta who had become the most vocal critic of the administration. Blanco supporters then turned to party leader and Mayor of Santo Domingo, the popular José Francisco Peña Gómez. At first he did not accept it (neither declined it) but after surviving a heart attack he believed it was his destiny to become president and so he decided to run against his once closest party colleague. The race was extremely close and divisive, even causing a shoot out at the Concorde Hotel but when results came in, Majluta was declared the winner.

The post-convention process was traumatizing and many PRD members refused to endorse Majluta. Some Gomez supporters even went as far as to endorse Juan Bosch. Carlos Andrés Pérez President of Venezuela and strong activist of Socialist International campaigned for Gomez to be included on the ticket as vice president but Majluta said he preferred to lose than to win alongside Peña Gomez who he felt had betrayed him by competing against him. A deal similar to the one Guzmán had made with Blanco and the latter with Majluta was offered to Gomez but he declined calling it a "cursed gift". Ultimately Nicolas Vargas of Santiago was chosen as running mate.

=== PRSC ===
Ever since the foundation of the Reformist Party, Joaquín Balaguer had been its candidate in the presidential elections, a position which continued after the merger with the Christian Social Revolutionary Party to create the Christian Social Reformist Party. This caused some disgust among young reformers like Victor Gomez Berges and Fernando Alvarez Bogaert who claimed that Balaguer was too old (80) to run for the presidency, but he ultimately achieved the nomination with only token opposition from Julio Cesar Castaños Espaillat who only received one vote (his own). Balaguer chose Carlos Morales Troncoso, a successful businessman as his running mate.

=== PLD ===
Juan Bosch received no opposition for the nomination of the Dominican Liberation Party, which he had founded after splitting from the PRD in 1973. His running mate was former rector of the University of Santo Domingo, Jose Joaquin Bido Medina.

=== Minor parties ===
Narciso Isa Conde was candidate for Dominican Communist Party and famous lawyer Vincho Castillo was the candidate of his National Progressive Force.

== Campaign ==
After eight years of PRD governments, the once great popularity of the white party was becoming mild while former President Joaquín Balaguer was surging as an alternative among the new voters and Juan Bosch was attracting dissatisfied PRD voters.

Bosch campaigned hard against alleged corruption in the Guzmán and Jorge Blanco administration even publishing what his party called the "corruption album" which consisted of pictures that were claimed to be proof of illicit enrichment of his former party mates. Attacks were also directed towards Balaguer bringing up the deaths of "the 12 years". A popular slogan during the PLD campaign was "Juan Bosch ni robo ni mato!" a reference to the lack of corruption or political murders during Juan Bosch's presidency in 1963.

The PRD was quick to answer with "Juan Bosch ni robo ni mato...porque tiempo no le dio" poking fun at the fact that Bosch was only in government for 7 months and therefore lacked the time to do the things he accused his opponents of.

Due to the unpopularity of the Jorge Blanco administration and therefore the PRD party itself, Majluta created the Liberal Party of the Dominican Republic which would form an alliance with the PRD so that he could try to get voters who detested the incumbent party. His candidacy was also supported by Constitutional Action Party and Nationalist Democratic Party. Negotiations were also held with Elías Wessin y Wessin leader of the Democratic Quisqueya Party but these fell apart and Wessin ultimately supported Balaguer, whom he had tried to overthrow in 1971 and was exiled for it.

Balaguer conducted a vigorous campaign which attracted many young voters and old foes. Besides Wessin, he was now also supported by Donald Reid Cabral ex-President of the triumvirate that ruled the country while Balaguer was in exile, Mario Read Vittini, and many communists who had fought him in the past, including Tacito Perdomo.

After a bloody riot in 1984 which resulted in the deaths of hundreds of people, the PRD could no longer attack Balaguer for the dark past of his previous governments which enabled him to get much of the youth vote.

Balaguer supporters chanted "vuelve y vuelve!" at the political rallies as their victory chant referring to his possible return to the presidency. The 80-year-old caudillo was attacked due to his blindness during the campaign to which he responded As President I will not be asked to thread needles.

Since Majluta's picture would be on four different party's ballots he feared that the less enlightened voters who made up the PRD's core would cast votes for him in all four and thus spoiling the vote. As a result, during his campaign he attempted to educate voters to only cast a vote for him on one ballot.

== Results ==
=== President ===
What Majluta so greatly feared came to be when vote counts showed a great number of invalid votes. Balaguer had a lead over him but the number of invalid votes was bigger than that of the margin of victory. Jacobo tried to get the ballots counted since the great majority of these were ballots that had his face marked multiple times on the PRD and Liberal Party tickets and therefore were undeniably cast for him. On 19 May, with 92% of the votes counted, the vote count was halted and guards were placed outside the Central Elections Board and Majluta declared himself the winner despite being behind Balaguer in the tally. After appeals from Salvador Jorge Blanco, the vote counting was resumed on 21 May, only to be stopped again the following day.

A month passed and there was still uncertainty over who had really won the election but Balaguer's margin had grown and ended up surpassing the number of invalid votes. Jacobo, faced with the lack of support from his own party, popular impatience growing, and Balaguer recognized as the winner by the PLD, finally conceded, and Balaguer, whose political career was seen as a thing of the past, became president for a fourth time.

Candidate	Party	Votes	%
Joaquín Balaguer	Social Christian Reformist Party	877,378	41.53
Jacobo Majluta	Dominican Revolutionary Party	828,209	39.20
Juan Bosch	Dominican Liberation Party	378,881	17.93
Vincho Castillo	National Progressive Force	6,684	0.32
Narciso Isa Conde	Dominican Communist Party	5,021	0.24
Jorge Martínez Lavandier	Nationalist Democratic Party	1,202	0.06
Other candidates		15,370	0.73
Total		2,112,745	100.00
Valid votes		2,112,745	96.19
Invalid/blank votes		83,710	3.81
Total votes		2,196,455	100.00
Registered voters/turnout		3,039,347	72.27
Source: Nohlen

=== Congress ===
Party	Votes	%	Seats			
Party	Votes	%	House	+/–	Senate	+/–
PRSC–PQD–PNVC	877,380	41.55	56	+6	21	+11
PRD–PPC–MCN–UD–LE	828,209	39.22	48	–14	7	–10
Dominican Liberation Party	387,881	18.37	16	+9	2	+2
Other parties	18,275	0.87	0	–	0	–
Total	2,111,745	100.00	120	0	30	+3
Valid votes	2,111,745	96.18				
Invalid/blank votes	83,903	3.82				
Total votes	2,195,648	100.00				
Registered voters/turnout	3,039,347	72.24				
Source: Nohlen
