= 1970 Dominican Republic general election =

← 1966	16 May 1970	1974 →
- Presidential election
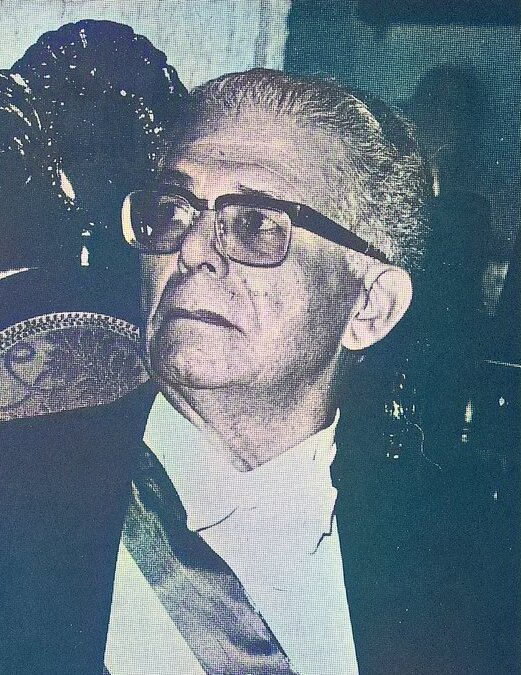

Nominee	Joaquín Balaguer	Francisco Augusto Lora
Party	PR	MIDA
Popular vote	707,136	252,760
Percentage	57.11%	20.41%
Nominee	Elías Wessin y Wessin	Alfonso Moreno Martínez
Party	PQD	PRSC
Popular vote	168,751	63,797
Percentage	13.62%	5.14%
- Results by department
President before election
Joaquín Balaguer
PR
Elected President
Joaquín Balaguer
PR

General elections were held in the Dominican Republic on 16 May 1970. The main opposition party, the Dominican Revolutionary Party, did not contest the elections, leaving only the ruling Reformist Party and some right-wing and centre-right parties. Incumbent Joaquín Balaguer won the presidential election, whilst his Reformist Party won the Congressional elections. Voter turnout was 63%.

== Results ==
=== President ===
Candidate	Party	Votes	%
Joaquín Balaguer	Reformist Party	707,136	57.11
Francisco Augusto Lora	Movement of Democratic Integration	252,760	20.41
Elías Wessin y Wessin	Democratic Quisqueyano Party	168,751	13.63
Alfonso Moreno Martínez	Social Christian Revolutionary Party	63,697	5.14
Jaime Manuel Fernández González	Movement of National Reconciliation	45,861	3.70
Total		1,238,205	100.00
Valid votes		1,238,205	95.40
Invalid/blank votes		59,638	4.60
Total votes		1,297,843	100.00
Registered voters/turnout		2,044,619	63.48
Source: Nohlen

=== Congress ===
Party	Votes	%	Seats			
Party	Votes	%	House	+/–	Senate	+/–
Reformist Party	653,565	52.78	45	–3	21	–1
Movement of Democratic Integration	252,760	20.41	11	New	1	New
Democratic Quisqueyano Party	168,751	13.63	3	New	0	New
Social Christian Revolutionary Party	63,697	5.14	0	–1	0	0
National Youth Movement	53,571	4.33	15	New	5	New
Movement of National Reconciliation	45,861	3.70	0	New	0	New
Total	1,238,205	100.00	74	0	27	0
Valid votes	1,238,205	95.40				
Invalid/blank votes	59,638	4.60				
Total votes	1,297,843	100.00				
Registered voters/turnout	2,044,619	63.48				
Source: Nohlen
