= 1994 Dominican Republic general election =

- 16 May 1994
- Presidential election
- Turnout: 87.91% (▲27.37pp)
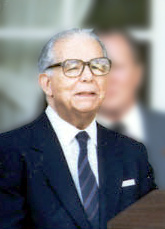

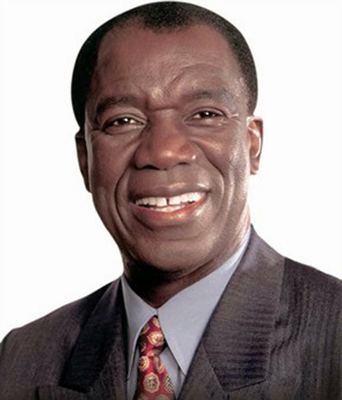

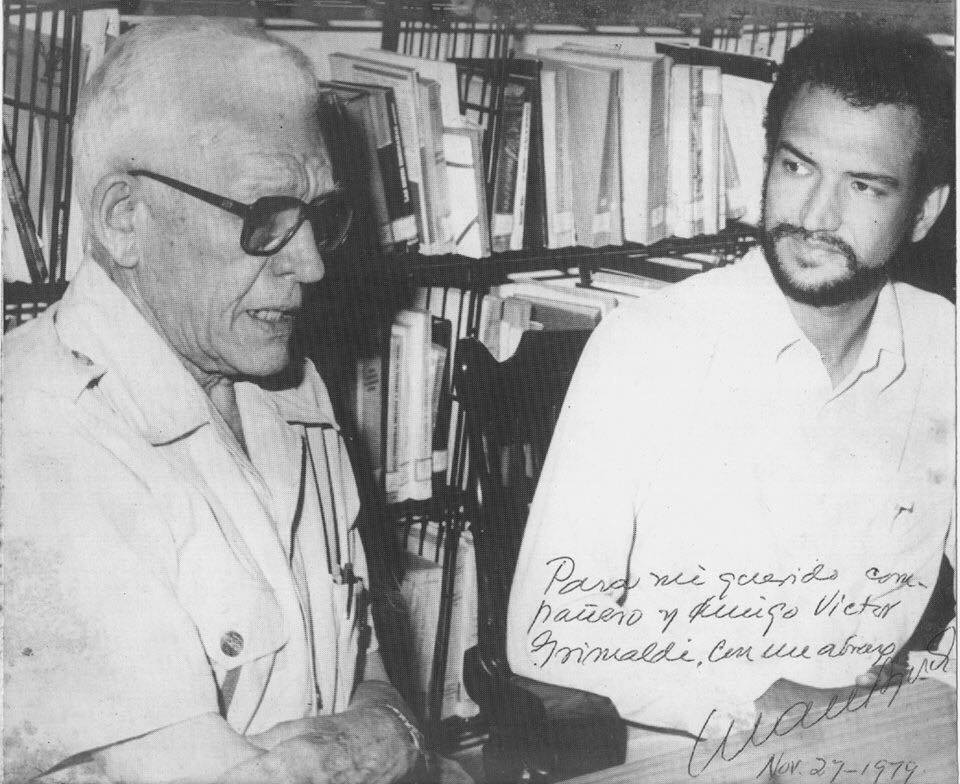
Nominee	Joaquín Balaguer	José Francisco Peña Gómez	Juan Bosch
Party	PRSC	PRD	PLD
Popular vote	1,275,460	1,253,179	395,653
Percentage	42.29%	41.55%	13.12%
- Presidential election results by province
President before election
Joaquín Balaguer
PRSC
Elected President
Joaquín Balaguer
PRSC

General elections were held in the Dominican Republic on 16 May 1994. Joaquín Balaguer of the Social Christian Reformist Party won the presidential election, whilst the Dominican Revolutionary Party-led alliance won the Congressional elections. Voter turnout was 87.6%.

Despite reforms after the 1990 elections, including a new electoral roll, these elections were also branded fraudulent. Following the election an agreement known as the Pact for Democracy (Pacto por la Democracia) was reached, which shortened the presidential term to two years, allowing new elections to be held in 1996 in which Balaguer would not run (for the first time since 1966).

== Results ==
=== President ===
Candidate	Party	Votes	%
Joaquín Balaguer	Social Christian Reformist Party	1,275,460	42.29
José Francisco Peña Gómez	Dominican Revolutionary Party	1,253,179	41.55
Juan Bosch	Dominican Liberation Party	395,653	13.12
Jacobo Majluta	Independent Revolutionary Party	68,910	2.29
Antonio Reynoso	Movement for Independence, Unity and Change	22,548	0.75
Total		3,015,750	100.00
Valid votes		3,015,750	95.33
Invalid/blank votes		147,646	4.67
Total votes		3,163,396	100.00
Registered voters/turnout		3,598,328	87.91
Source: Nohlen

=== Congress ===
Party	Votes	%	Seats			
Party	Votes	%	House	+/–	Senate	+/–
PRD–UD–PRI–BIS–PQD–ASD–PNVC	1,244,441	41.92	57	–	15	–
PRSC–PDP	1,160,405	39.09	50	-	14	-
Dominican Liberation Party	467,617	15.75	13	–	1	–
Institutional Democratic Party	95,819	3.23	0	–	0	–
Movement of National Reconciliation	95,819	3.23	0	New	0	New
Party of the Dominican People	95,819	3.23	0	0	0	0
National Renaissance Party	95,819	3.23	0	New	0	New
Total	2,968,282	100.00	120	0	30	0
Valid votes	2,968,282	94.21				
Invalid/blank votes	182,556	5.79				
Total votes	3,150,838	100.00				
Registered voters/turnout	3,598,328	87.56				
Source: Nohlen
