= Anti-Imperialist Patriotic Union =

Anti-Imperialist Patriotic Union Unión Patriótica Antiimperialista
- Founded: October 1977
- Dissolved: June 2004
- Succeeded by: Country Movement for All
- Political position: Left-wing to far-left

The Anti-Imperialist Patriotic Union (Spanish: Unión Patriótica Antiimperialista, abbreviated UPA) was a political movement in the Dominican Republic.

UPA was founded in October 1977. It was founded by leaders of the Linea Roja group and progressive intellectuals. Prominent members of the nucleus of founders of UPA included Franklin Franco, Fidelio Despradel, Gabriel Imbert and Roberto Santana. UPA positioned itself as a democratic, revolutionary and anti-imperialist organization, seeking to establish a government independent from U.S. interests and a land reform on basis of 'land to the tiller'. At the helm of UPA was a nine-member National Executive Committee and a twenty one-member National Leading Committee. The movement had grassroots committees across the country. UPA received official recognition as a political party on January 21, 1978.

Ahead of the 1978 general election UPA formed an alliance with the Socialist Bloc (BS), which led to the launching of the United Left (IU). IU registered Rafael Taveras (Fafa) as its presidential candidate and Juan B. Mejía as candidate for vice president.

UPA held its third anniversary celebrations in Santo Domingo on October 23, 1980. As of 1980 Franklin Franco was the president of UPA and Iván Rodríguez its general secretary.

At the time of the 2004 general election UPA was part of the Unity of the People coalition (along with other left-wing groups), which supported the presidential candidature of Ramón Almanzar. As of 2004, Héctor Sánchez was the general secretary of UPA.

The UPA was dissolved in June 2004 with the aim to found a broader organization. In November 2007 was founded the movement Patria para Todos.
