= People's Democratic Party (Dominican Republic) =

Political party in the Dominican Republic

The People's Democratic Party (Spanish: Partido Demócrata Popular) is a minor political party in the Dominican Republic. It first contested national elections in 1974, when it provided the main opposition to the ruling Reformist Party due to the Dominican Revolutionary Party not contesting the elections. Its candidate, Luis Homero Lajara Burgos, received 15% of the vote in the presidential election, whilst the party won three seats in the House of Representatives. In 1978 many of the opposition parties returned to the electoral scene. Lajara Burgos received only 0.4% of the vote in the presidential election, whilst the party lost all three seats in the House of Representatives after a similar result in the Congressional elections.

In 1994 it formed an alliance with the Social Christian Reformist Party. Whilst the PRSC's candidate won the presidential election, the alliance was defeated by the Dominican Revolutionary Party-led coalition in the Congressional elections. In the 2006 elections it was part of the defeated Grand National Alliance.
