= National Citizen Will Party =

Christian democratic party in the Dominican Republic

National Citizen Will Party Partido Nacional Voluntad Ciudadana
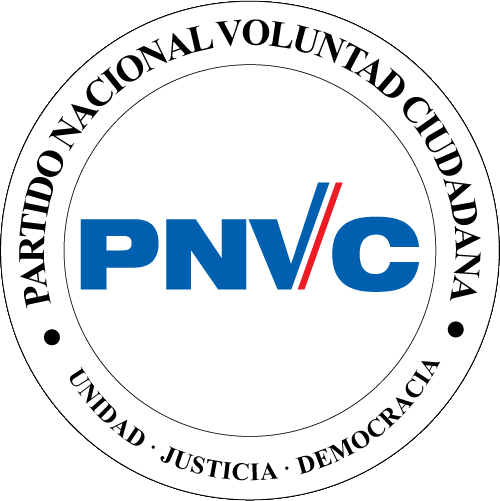
- Abbreviation: PNVC
- President: Juan Cohen
- Founder: Federico Marte Pichardo
- Founded: 5 October 1973; 53 years ago
- Ideology: Christian democracy
- Political position: Centre
- Slogan: Unidad, justicia y democracia ("Unity, justice and democracy")

Website
- pnvc.org

The National Citizen Will Party (Spanish: Partido Nacional Voluntad Ciudadana, PNVC), formerly known as the National Civic Veterans Party, is a Christian democratic political party in the Dominican Republic. It was founded on 10 May 1973 by Sergeant Federico Marte Pichardo, under the initiative of then-President Joaquin Balaguer, and was renamed on 8 March 2015. It is currently directed by Juan Cohen.

The party first contested national elections in 1982 when it won 1.6% of the vote, but failed to win a seat. For the 1986 and 1990 elections it was part of the victorious Social Christian Reformist Party-led coalition. For the 1994 elections it changed its allegiance to the Dominican Revolutionary Party-led coalition that won the Congressional elections but lost the presidential vote. It contested the 2002 elections alone, but failed to win a seat after receiving only 0.5% of the vote. For the 2006 elections it was part of the defeated Grand National Alliance.

== Positions ==
The party cites the following values as its inspiration:

- Liberty
- Democracy
- Christian development
- Tolerance
- Human well-being
- Equality
