= Elías Wessin y Wessin =

Dominican politician and general (1924–2009)

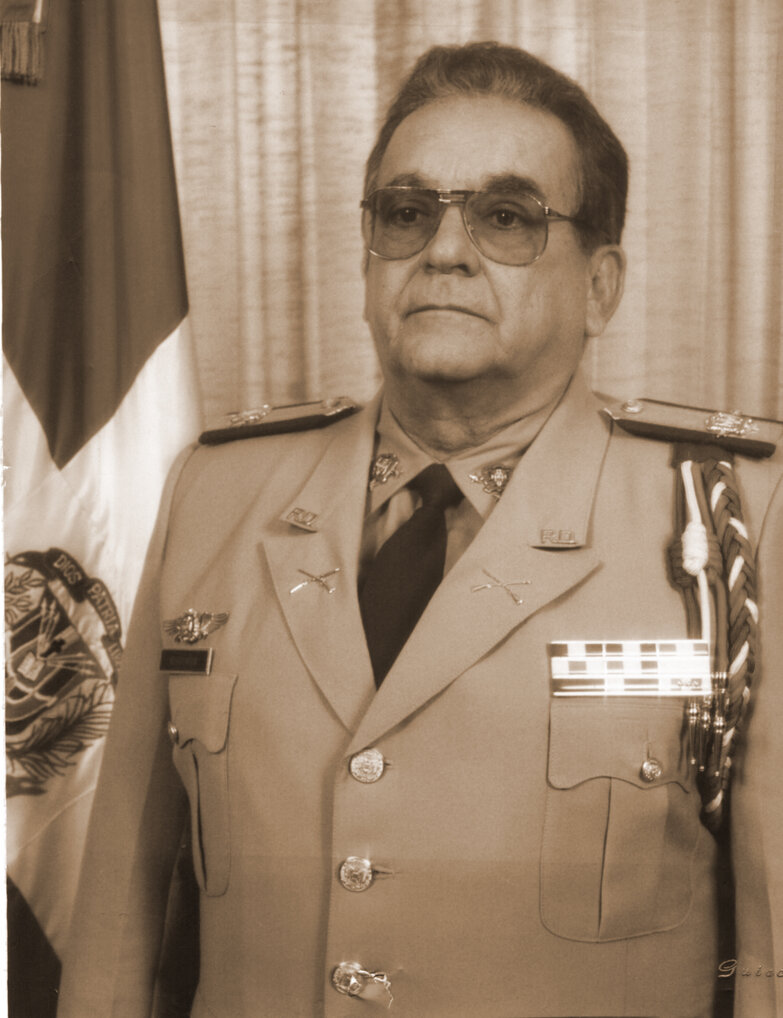
- Portrait in 1988

Minister of Defense of the Dominican Republic
- In office 1988–1991
- President: Joaquín Balaguer
- Preceded by: Antonio Imbert Barrera
- Succeeded by: Héctor García Tejada

Personal details
- Born: July 22, 1924
- Died: April 18, 2009 (aged 84)
- Spouse: Estela García de Wessin
- Children: Elías Wessin Chávez

Military service
- Years of service: Mid 1940s–1965
- Rank: Major General
- Battles/wars: 1963 Coup; Dominican Civil War

Elías Wessin y Wessin (July 22, 1924 – April 18, 2009) was a Dominican politician and air force general. Wessin help lead the military coup which ousted the government of Dominican President Juan Bosch in 1963, replacing it with a triumvirate. He was also a key figure in the ensuing Dominican Civil War, which led to a United States military intervention into and occupation of the Dominican Republic in 1965.

== Early life ==
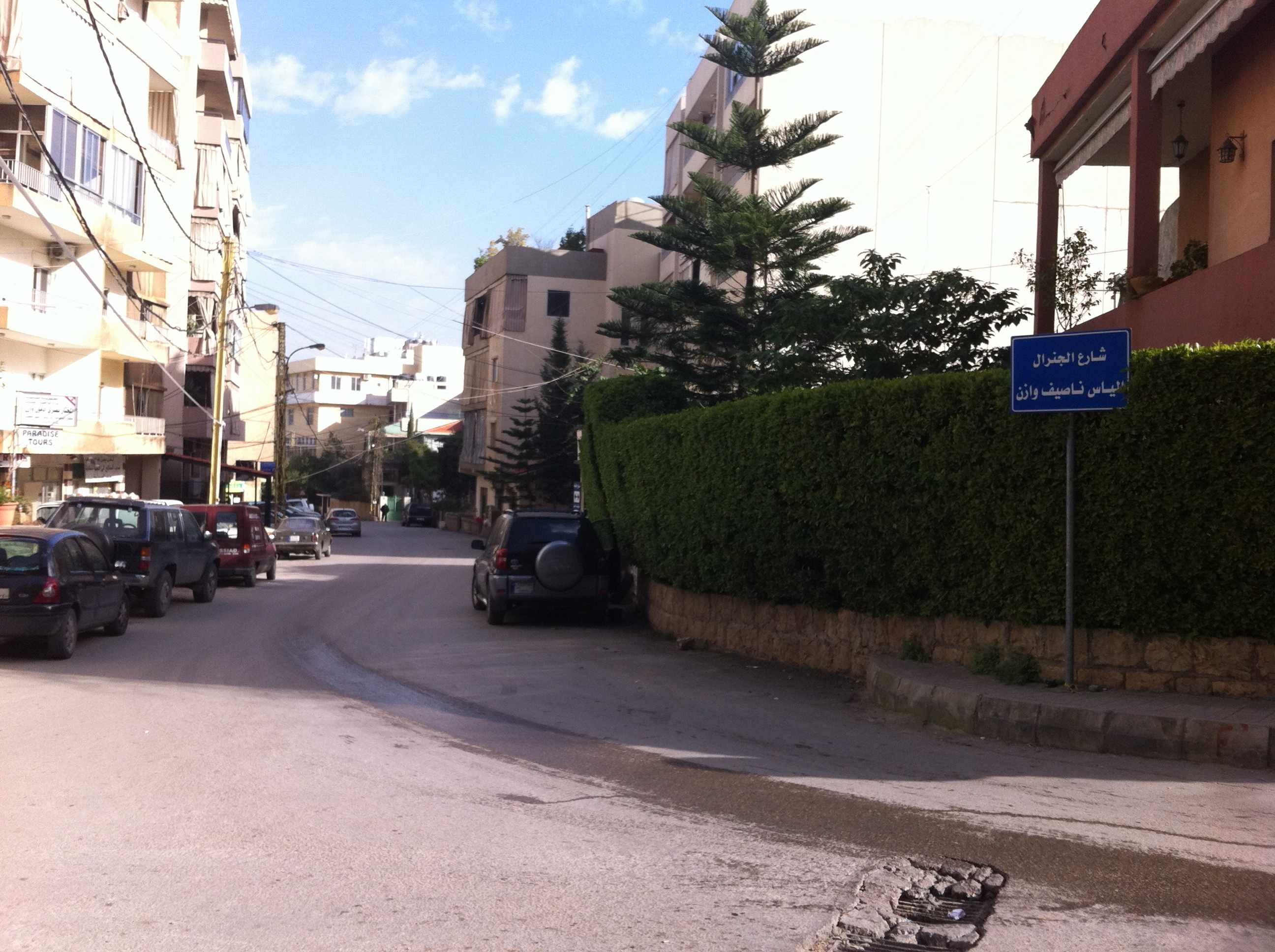
General Elias Wessin (Wazen) Street in Dekwaneh, Lebanon.

Wessin was born in Bayaguana, Monte Plata Province, Dominican Republic, on July 22, 1924. His parents were immigrants from the coastal town of Dekwaneh in Lebanon. The family name in Lebanon as it is used today is spelt Wazen, a phonetic variant of the name in Lebanese Arabic.

Wessin's career in the Dominican Air Force began as a military pilot.

== Career ==
Wessin's first intervention in Dominican politics as an air force officer began in 1961, following the assassination of President Rafael Trujillo, a dictator. Wessin, who commanded an infantry battalion at the time of Trujillo's assassination, helped Trujillo's wife and family to flee the country.

During the Revolution, Wessin refused to abandon his post because he did not want the rebels, whom he accused of being pro-communist, to take over the country. This was partly why the U.S tended towards the loyalist (Wessin's forces), and not towards Francisco Caamaño, who was acting in the behalf of Juan Bosch. He later ran as a candidate in the 1970 presidential election.

Wessin was allowed to return from exile in 1978 after the government issued a general amnesty. He reconciled with his former political rival, President Joaquín Balaguer, and actively campaigned for Balaguer during the 1986 presidential election. Due to his support for Balaguer, Wessin served as the country's interior minister and, later, as Secretary of the Armed Forces during Balaguer's administrations.

Wessin was featured on the cover of Time magazine on May 7, 1965.

== 1963 coup ==
Elías Wessin y Wessin played a significant supporting role in the 1963 Dominican coup d'état, though he was not its main architect. As a senior officer in the Dominican Air Force, he helped ensure that key military units backed the plot against President Juan Bosch. Wessin strongly opposed Bosch’s reforms, which aimed to expand civil rights and limit military influence, viewing them as a threat and potentially sympathetic to leftist ideas. By aligning with other conservative officers and elites, he contributed to the coalition that removed Bosch from power in September 1963 with little resistance. After the coup, Wessin remained a powerful figure within the military and continued to oppose Bosch’s return. His role in these events helped set the stage for the deeper conflict that later erupted in the Dominican Civil War, where he became a leading commander.

== Death ==
Elías Wessin y Wessin died of a heart attack on April 18, 2009, in Santo Dominigo, Dominican Republic, at the age of 84. He was survived by his wife, Livia Chávez, and their two sons.

Military offices
Preceded by Antonio Imbert Barrera	Minister of Defense of the Dominican Republic; 1988–1991	Succeeded by Héctor García Tejada
