= Dominican Liberation Party =

Dominican Liberation Party Partido de la Liberación Dominicana
- Abbreviation: PLD
- Leader: Danilo Medina
- President: Danilo Medina
- Spokesperson: Ydenia Doñé Tiburcio (Chamber of Deputies)
- Secretary-General: Johnny Pujols
- Founder: Juan Bosch
- Founded: 15 December 1973; 52 years ago
- Split from: Dominican Revolutionary Party
- Headquarters: Avenida Independencia 401, Gascue, Santo Domingo, Distrito Nacional, 10205, Dominican Republic
- Newspaper: Vanguardia del Pueblo
- Membership (2023): 2,177,036
- Ideology: Social democracy
- Political position: Centre to centre-left
- Regional affiliation: Parliamentary Group of the Left
- Continental affiliation: COPPPAL; São Paulo Forum
- Colors: Violet and Yellow
- Anthem: "Himno del Partido de la Liberacion Dominicana" "Hymn of Dominican Liberation Party"
- Chamber of Deputies: 13 / 190
- Senate: 0 / 32
- Mayors: 15 / 155
- Central American Parliament: 4 / 20

Party flag

Website
- pld.org.do

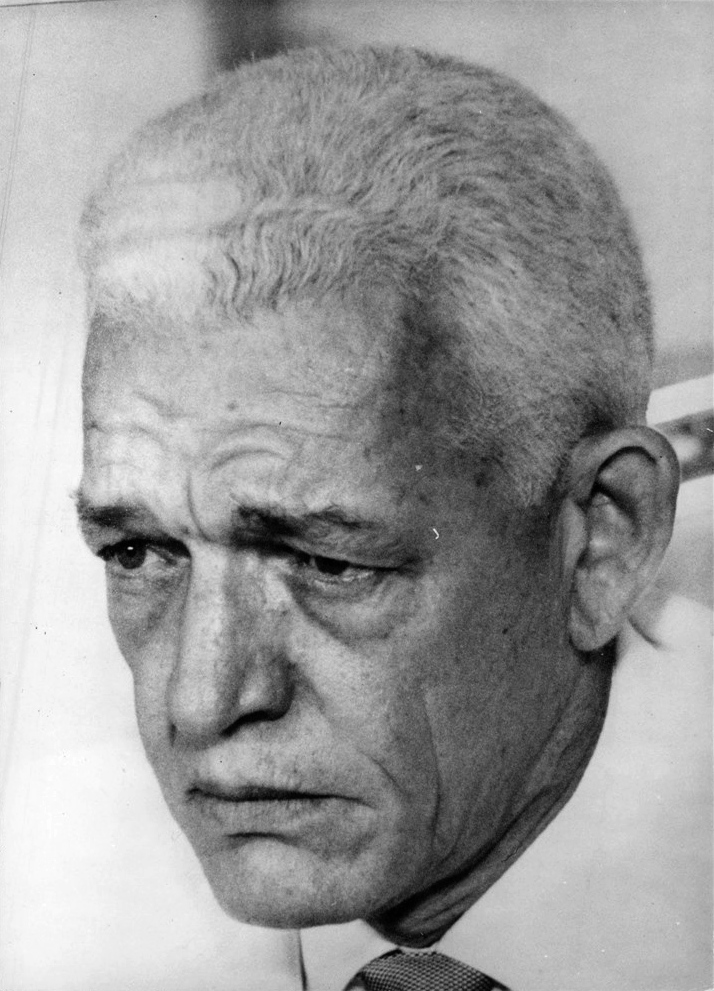
Juan Bosch, first president of the Dominican Liberation Party (1973–2001)

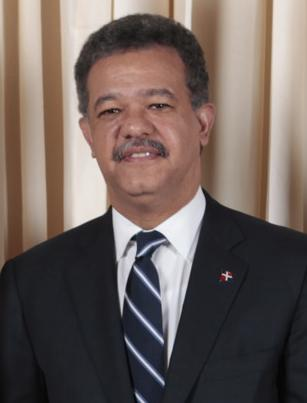
Leonel Fernández, second president of the Dominican Liberation Party (2001–2019)

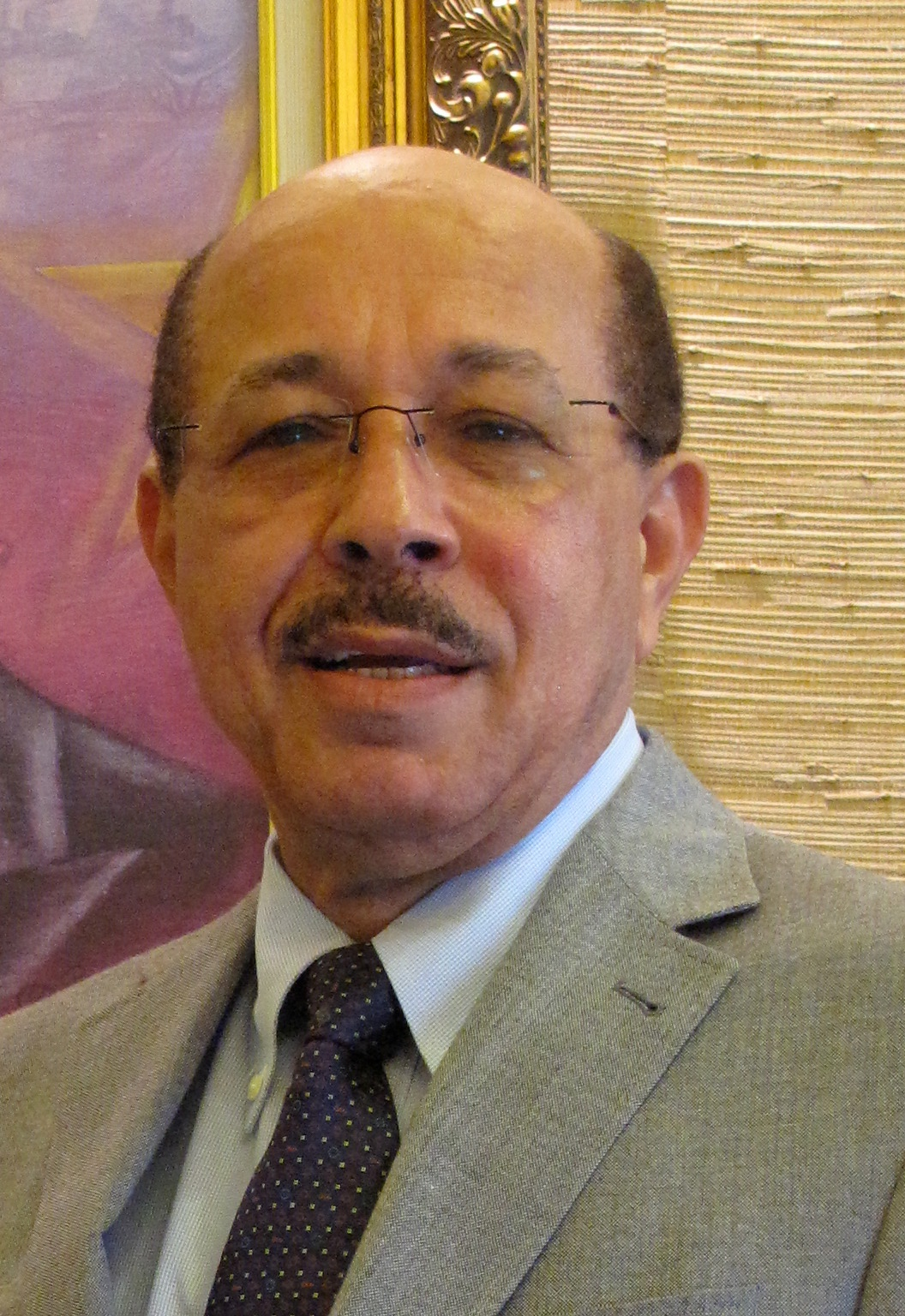
Temístocles Montás, interim president of the Dominican Liberation Party (2019-2021)

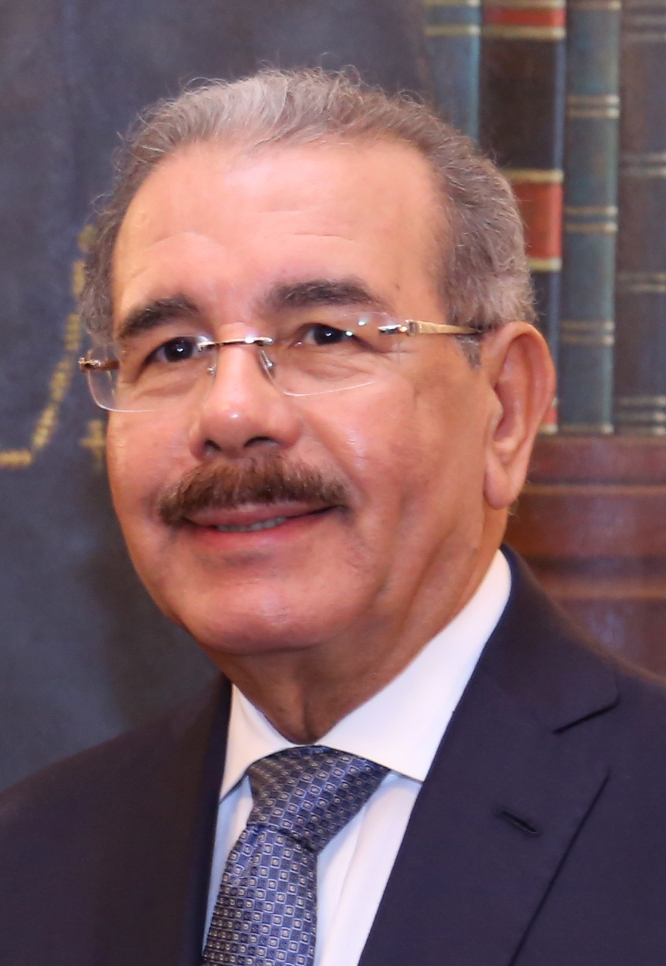
Danilo Medina, The current president of the Dominican Liberation Party

The Dominican Liberation Party (Spanish: Partido de la Liberación Dominicana, PLD) is a political party in the Dominican Republic. Founded in 1973 by former president Juan Bosch, the party, along with the Dominican Revolutionary Party (referred to here by its Spanish acronym, the PRD), and Social Christian Reformist Party, has dominated politics in the country since the establishment of democracy in the early 1960s.

The PLD have won several elections since the late 1990s and had held control over much of the government until 2020, when the Modern Revolutionary Party (referred to here by its Spanish acronym, the PRM) won several governmental seats as well as the presidency with the election of Luis Abinader as president. The PLD party's logo is a yellow five-pointed star on a purple background.

== Overview ==
The PLD has been a major player in the Dominican political landscape for many years. Since its founding in 1973, it has won 5 of the last 7 presidential elections. Two presidents have been from the PLD: Leonel Fernandez (1996–2000; 2004–2012) and Danilo Medina (2012–2020). Only Hipólito Mejía of the PRD interrupted the PLD party’s long line of electoral successes between 2000 and 2004. The PRD served as a forerunner to the PLD since it was founded by the same man, Juan Bosch. However, when Bosch disliked the direction in which the PRD was going in the early ‘70s, he left the party and founded the PLD in 1973.

== Founder and History ==
Juan Emilio Bosch Gaviño was a politician and historian who founded the modern-day PLD. Bosch first involved himself in politics in the late 1920s, when he predicted the ascendency of the military leader, Rafael Leonidas Trujillo. Trujillo took power in 1930 and began shutting down the opposition, including Bosch. In 1934, Bosch was arrested under suspicion of being part of a conspiracy to overthrow the government. Proven innocent, he was released from custody and a few years later left the Dominican Republic to go to Puerto Rico with his wife for “medical reasons.” In reality, he had exiled himself since he did not want to be a part of Trujillo’s increasingly oppressive government.

Bosch returned after Trujillo was assassinated in the early 1960s, and became the nation’s first democratically elected president in 1963 with the support of John F. Kennedy. He took a position against corruption and worked to better the country’s position post-dictatorship. However, he was overthrown by the military after just a few months in office. Political scientist Matias Bosch stated, however, that the United States would often withdraw their support of Latin American democracies if they felt it might threaten their interests, especially in light of the recently revolutionized Cuba.

Bosch was exiled again and a civil war ensued soon thereafter, in an attempt to put Bosch in power again. This warranted intervention by the US government and a new democracy was established. This time, one of Trujillo’s original supporters, Joaquin Balaguer, won the presidency.

Bosch rejoined the PRD, but in the early 1970s, left the party because he felt that the PRD was only working for small and wealthy interest groups and not for the people. Bosch founded the PLD in 1973 and ran for president in several elections between 1978 and 1994 until finally retiring from political life in 1996, at the age of 87, when he conceded to a person whom some call his “disciple,” Leonel Fernandez, who ran as his vice president in the 1994 election.

== The Odebrecht Bribery Scandal ==
The Odebrecht Bribery Scandal was a scandal in which the Brazilian construction company Odebrecht paid millions of dollars in bribes to various governments in Africa and Latin America—including the Dominican Republic—for special construction contracts, occurring between 2001 and 2014. It spanned three Dominican presidents—Mejia, Fernandez, and Medina—the latter two of which were PLD. It was revealed that the company had paid more than 90 million dollars to the Dominican government and had been involved in construction projects that included aqueducts, hydroelectric plants, and roads and highways. This scandal that swept the whole of Latin America led to a lot of discontent and distrust among the citizens of the Dominican Republic towards the government. In fact, a new movement emerged called the Green March (Spanish: Marcha Verde) in protest of the scandal, which in fact was explicitly mentioned in their manifesto.

== 2020 Elections ==
The Dominican elections that occurred on July 5, 2020 represent the first time in 16 years that the PLD lost the presidency. The elections were postponed from May to July due to the coronavirus pandemic. More than 4 million people came out to vote, within the country and abroad. The candidate for the PLD was Gonzalo Castillo and for the PRM, Luis Abinader, who had run in 2016 against the PLD incumbent Danilo Medina. When the results came in, it was announced that Abinader had won the presidency with 54% of the vote compared to Castillo’s 37%. The PLD also lost several Senate and Parliamentary seats, effectively losing much of the hold they had had in the government years. In an op-ed article, the former PLD President Leonel Fernandez wrote that the results of the elections reflected a conjunction of several factors including the Odebrecht scandal and the recent protests in the country against the government of Medina and the PLD.

== Brief overview of election statistics ==
The party has been elected into office five times now, with its last president Danilo Medina President of the Dominican Republic, in the 1996, 2004, 2008, 2012, and 2016 elections, though losing in 2000. In May 2006 the party and its allies gained control of both houses of Congress.

At the legislative elections, 16 May 2002, the party won 29.1% of the popular vote and 41 out of 150 seats in the Chamber of Deputies and 2 out of 31 seats in the Senate. Its candidate at the presidential election of 16 May 2004, Leonel Fernández, won 57.1% of the vote.

Founded by Juan Bosch in 1973, the PLD originally was considerably to the left of Bosch's original party, the Dominican Revolutionary Party. Bosch ran for president as the party’s candidate several times, but did not win. Following Bosch’s retirement, Fernandez became the leader of the party and won the 1996 presidential elections after forming an alliance with Dr. Joaquín Balaguer, Bosch’s political enemy for over 30 years. He did not run for another term in 2000 as he was term-limited, but returned to the presidency in 2004. The party's logo is a yellow five-pointed star on a purple background.

In the 16 May 2006 legislative elections, the party led the Progressive Bloc, that won 96 out of 178 deputies and 22 out of 32 senators.

On May 16, 2008, presidential elections were carried and PLD candidate Leonel Fernández won 54%, defeating 7 other presidential candidates.

On May 16, 2010, congressional and municipal elections held, the Dominican Liberation Party won a majority of senators (31 of 32) and representatives, as well the largest number of mayors around the country.

On May 20, 2012 the PLD won its third straight presidential elections with its candidate Danilo Medina, with 51.2% of the vote, against former president Hipólito Mejía, from the Dominican Revolutionary Party (PRD) who obtained 46.9% on these elections.

By 2016, the PLD has retained the presidency of the Dominican Republic for 16 out of the previous 20 years, and has become the only party in the Dominican Republic to have attained this achievement in the country's democratic history after the dictatorship of Rafael Trujillo which lasted between 1930 until 1961.

On July 5, 2020, the party's 16-year rule in the Dominican Republic officially ended after losing to the rival Modern Revolutionary Party (PRM).

== Full members of the Political Committee ==
Member	Admission	Age (as 02/13)
Euclides Gutiérrez Féliz	1973	76
Lidio Cadet	1982	80
Danilo Medina	1990	61
Juan Temístocles Montás	1990	62
Alejandrina Germán	1995	63
Jaime David Fernández Mirabal	1996	56
Cristina Lizardo	2001	54
Francisco Javier García	2001	53
José Ramón Fadul	2001	60
Ramón Ventura Camejo	2001	59
Radhamés Segura	2001	63
Rafael Alburquerque	2004	72
Carlos Amarante Baret	2006	52
Radhamés Camacho	2006	54

== Temporary members of the Political Committee ==
Member	Admission	Reason	Age
Abel Martínez	2010	Elected President of Chambers of Deputies	40
Margarita Cedeño	2012	Elected Vice-President of the Republic	47

== Electoral history ==
=== Presidential elections ===
Election	Candidate	First Round		Second Round		Result
Election	Candidate	Votes	%	Votes	%	Result
1978	Juan Bosch	18,375	1.1%			Lost ✗
1982	Juan Bosch	179,849	9.8%			Lost ✗
1986	Juan Bosch	378,881	18.4%			Lost ✗
1990	Juan Bosch	653,595	33.79%			Lost ✗
1994	Juan Bosch	395,653	13.1%			Lost ✗
1996	Leonel Fernández	1,130,523	38.9%	1,466,382	51.3%	Elected ✓
2000	Danilo Medina	796,923	24.94%			Lost ✗
2004	Leonel Fernández	2,063,871	57.1%			Elected ✓
2008	Leonel Fernández	2,199,734	53.83%			Elected ✓
2012	Danilo Medina	2,323,463	51.21%			Elected ✓
2016	Danilo Medina	2,847,438	61.74%			Elected ✓
2020	Gonzalo Castillo	1,536,989	37.46%			Lost ✗
2024	Abel Martínez	453,016	10.39%			Lost ✗

=== Congressional elections ===
Election	Votes	%	Chamber seats	+/–	Position	Senate seats	+/–	Position
1978	18,565	1.1%	0 / 91	Steady	▲3rd	0 / 27	Steady	▲3rd
1982	174,464	9.7%	7 / 120	▲7	3rd	0 / 27	Steady	3rd
1986	387,881	18.4%	16 / 120	▲9	3rd	2 / 30	▲2	3rd
1990	625,929	32.7% in alliance with UD	44 / 120	▲28	▲2nd	12 / 30	▲10	▲2nd
1994	467,617	15.8%	13 / 120	▼31	▼3rd	1 / 30	▼11	▼3rd
1998	654,713	31.3%	49 / 149	▲36	▲2nd	4 / 30	▲3	▲2nd
2002	657,658	28.8% in alliance with BIS and APD	41 / 150	▼8	2nd	1 / 30	▼3	▼3rd
2006	1,387,878	46.4% as part of the Progressive Bloc	96 / 178	▲55	▲1st	22 / 32	▲21	▲1st
2010	1,380,601	41.71%	93 / 183	▼3	1st	28 / 32	▲6	1st
2016	1,794,325	41.79%	106 / 190	▲13	1st	26 / 32	▼2	1st
2020	1,261,802	31.52%	75 / 190	▼31	▼2nd	6 / 32	▼20	▼2nd
2024	641,585	15.03%	13 / 190	▼62	▼3rd	0 / 32	▼6	▼3rd
