= Héctor García-Godoy =

President of the Dominican Republic from 1965 to 1966

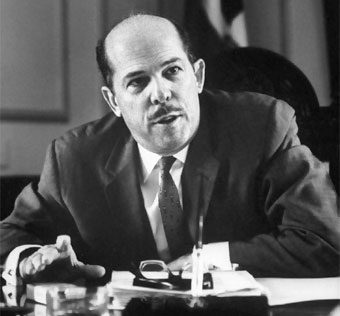
- García-Godoy in 1965

44th President of the Dominican Republic
- In office 3 September 1965 – 1 July 1966
- Vice President: Manuel Joaquín Castillo
- Preceded by: Francisco Caamaño (as President of the Government of National Reconstruction); Juan Bosch (as President, 1963)
- Succeeded by: Joaquín Balaguer

Personal details
- Born: 11 January 1921 Moca, Dominican Republic
- Died: 20 April 1970 (aged 49) Santo Domingo, Dominican Republic
- Spouse: Matilde Pastoriza Espaillat (m. 1944)
- Children: 2

Héctor Rafael García-Godoy Cáceres (11 January 1921 – 20 April 1970) was a Dominican politician who served as the 44th president of the Dominican Republic from 1965 to 1966. He led the transitional government which ruled the country following the Dominican Civil War and organized elections held the following year. Former president Joaquín Balaguer won the election and succeeded García-Godoy which marked the beginning of Balaguer's 12 year rule, simply known as "The Twelve Years".

García-Godoy was the grandson of the Cuban-born Dominican poet Federico García Godoy and President Ramón Cáceres. He was also the cousin of the Dominican painter Darío Suro.

== Service ==
After serving as a diplomat in the mid-1940s, García-Godoy was employed at the Foreign Ministry and served on the board of directors of the Reserve Bank. He was appointed Deputy Chairman of the Central Bank of the Dominican Republic in 1955. In 1963, he served as foreign minister under Juan Bosch, whose government was overthrown later that year. Afterward he temporarily acted as president and organized the 1966 elections in which Joaquín Balaguer regained the presidency. Balaguer subsequently appointed him as ambassador to the United States in 1966, serving until 1969.
