= Evolutionist Liberal Party =

Dominican political party

Evolutionist Liberal Party (Spanish: Partido Liberal Evolucionista) was a political party in the Dominican Republic, founded by Fernando Amiama Tió.

At the time of the April 1965 war, the general secretary of the PLE, Héctor Aristy, joined rebel forces demanding the replacement of the Juan Bosch cabinet and upheld the progressive 1963 Constitution.

In the 1966 elections the party obtained 6,540 votes (0.49%).
