= 2000 Dominican Republic presidential election =

← 1996	16 May 2000	2004 →
- Turnout: 76.14% (▼2.49pp)
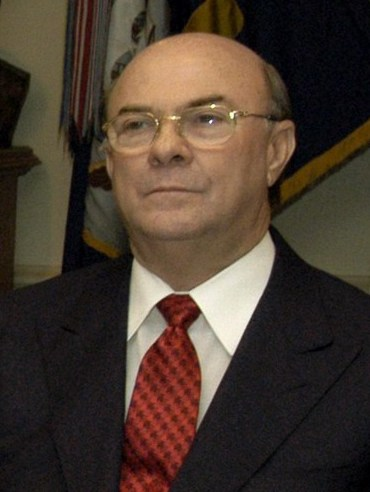

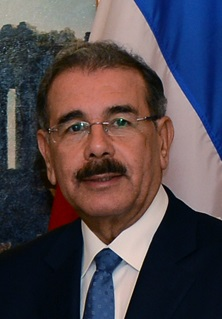

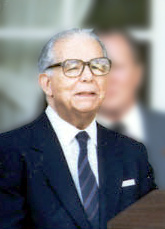
Nominee	Hipólito Mejía	Danilo Medina	Joaquín Balaguer
Party	PRD	PLD	PRSC
Popular vote	1,593,231	796,923	785,926
Percentage	49.87%	24.94%	24.60%
- Results by province
President before election
Leonel Fernández
PLD
Elected President
Hipólito Mejía
PRD

Presidential elections were held in the Dominican Republic on 16 May 2000. A runoff was to have taken place on 30 June between first-place finisher Hipólito Mejía of the Dominican Revolutionary Party (PRD) and runner-up Danilo Medina of the Dominican Liberation Party (PLD); former president Joaquín Balaguer of the Social Christian Reformist Party (PRSC) finished third. However, Medina pulled out of the runoff after concluding he did not have enough support to overcome Mejía's first-round lead, handing the presidency to Mejía. Voter turnout was 76.1%.

== Background ==
The last presidential election in 1996 saw Leonel Fernández of the PLD elected as President. He defeated José Francisco Peña Gómez of the PRD in the runoff after incumbent President Joaquín Balaguer, told his supporters to back Fernández. His party's candidate, then Vice President Jacinto Peynado had come in third place at the election without support from the core of the party.

Between 1996 and 2000 the economy grew strongly, with 7.1% growth in 1998 and 8.3% in 1999. This growth, the fastest of any Caribbean country, was fueled by increased foreign investment and the privatisation of state owned enterprises. However Fernández's approval ratings were only 45% by 1999, with strong discontent among the poor who had not benefited from economic growth and had seen power cuts and price rises. This helped lead to the opposition PRD winning a majority in the 1998 parliamentary elections.

== Candidates ==
Fernández was unable to run for re-election as the then constitution prevented consecutive presidential terms. As a result, the governing PLD selected an aide to Fernández, Danilo Medina, as their candidate. However, there was little enthusiasm for Medina, even in the PLD, and he trailed in the polls.

The opposition centre-left PRD candidate was Hipólito Mejía, a former agriculture minister from 1978 to 1982. Mejía quickly established an early lead in the polls.

In January 2000 the former president Balaguer, at the age of 93, announced that he would seek an eighth term as president as the candidate of his Social Christian Reformist Party. By this time, Balaguer was completely blind and unable to walk without assistance, but still had many committed supporters which meant he could hold the balance between the other 2 main candidates.

== Campaign ==
At the beginning of 2000, opinion polls showed Mejía in the lead with 45% support, compared to 26% for Medina and 20% for Balaguer.

Mejía campaigned by attacking inequality between rich and poor, pledging to increase social spending and to preserve a role for the state in the economy. Mejía said that he would reverse some of the privatisations that he said had been corrupt and annul licenses for 10 sugar refineries. Mejía also pledged to make the Dominican Republic self-sufficient in food, from its position as an importer of $1.1bn food. However some of Meija's plans were seen as campaign rhetoric and he was seen as likely to be more economically orthodox than his campaign would make him seem to be.

Mejía's plans were attacked by the incumbent president Fernández, who said they would damage the economy. Medina meanwhile pledged to continue the economic policies pursued by Fernández, while trying to help the neediest people more. Medina saw economic growth as providing the opportunity for more investment in education and health. However the Social Christian Reformist Party also attacked the government for mismanagement and was seen as being less likely to back the PLD than in 1996 if they came third. Balaguer said he would prioritise agrarian reform, helping farmers and preserving the natural resources of the Dominican Republic if he was elected and he gained as the election neared.

Fears that the election could be affected by violence were raised after an official of the PLD was killed after an incident involving the bodyguards of the PRD's Mejía. However the election proceeded alright and international election monitors said they did not find any irregularities in the vote.

== Results ==
The first round results saw Hipólito Mejía win 49.87% of the vote, compared to 24.9% for Danilo Medina and 24.6% for Joaquín Balaguer. Mejía finished just a few thousand votes short of an outright majority, and was thus due to face a runoff with Medina on 30 June. However, Mejía's supporters claimed victory and called on the opposition to avoid the expense of a runoff. After Balaguer said that he could not ensure all his supporters would back Medina, Medina concluded that a runoff would not be in the country's best interest, despite calls within his own party to stay in the race. However, Medina would have needed nearly all of Balaguer's supporters to back him in the runoff in order to have any realistic chance of closing the nearly 25-point first-round gap with Mejía.

As a result, Mejía was inaugurated as president on the 16 August 2000 and said that making the government accountable, education, health and welfare would be his priorities as president.

Candidate	Party	Votes	%
Hipólito Mejía	Dominican Revolutionary Party	1,593,231	49.87
Danilo Medina	Dominican Liberation Party	796,923	24.94
Joaquín Balaguer	Social Christian Reformist Party	785,926	24.60
José González Espinoza	Dominican Workers' Party	6,138	0.19
Ramón Almánzar	New Alternative Party	5,961	0.19
César Estrella Sadhalá	Dominican Movement of Unity and Integration	3,359	0.11
Agustín Encarnación	National Renaissance Party	3,278	0.10
Total		3,194,816	100.00
Valid votes		3,194,816	98.70
Invalid/blank votes		42,090	1.30
Total votes		3,236,906	100.00
Registered voters/turnout		4,251,218	76.14
Source: PDBA
