= 1990 Dominican Republic general election =

- 16 May 1990
- Presidential election
- Turnout: 60.54%
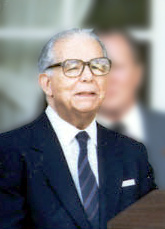

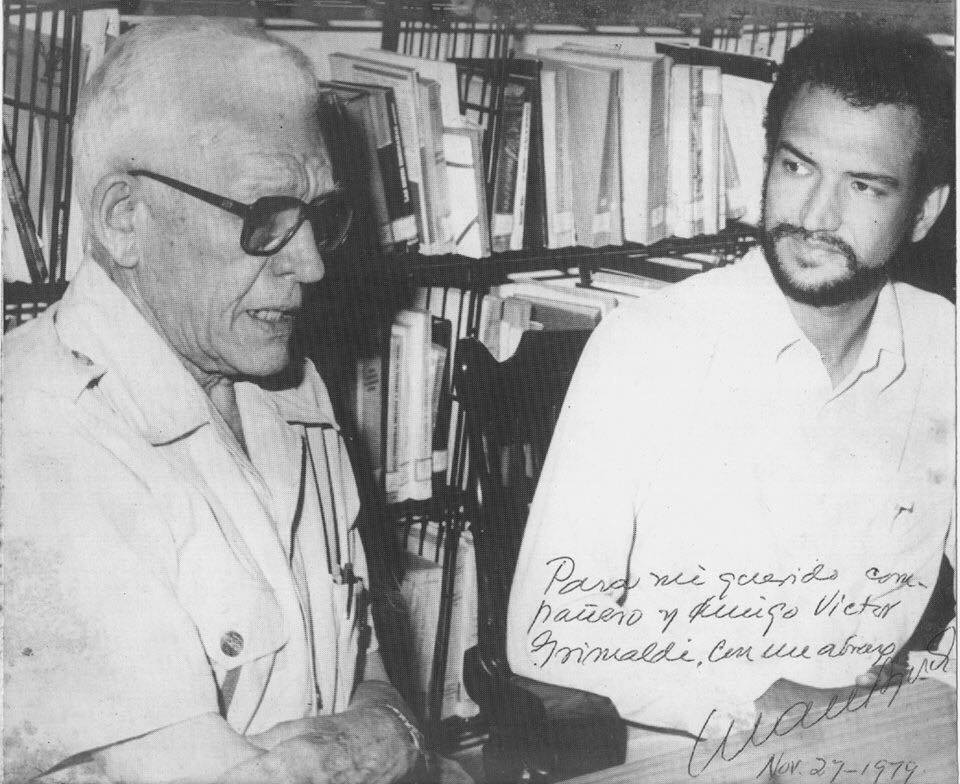

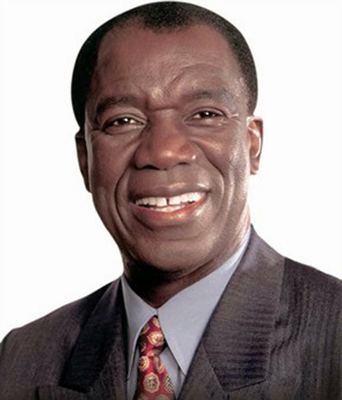

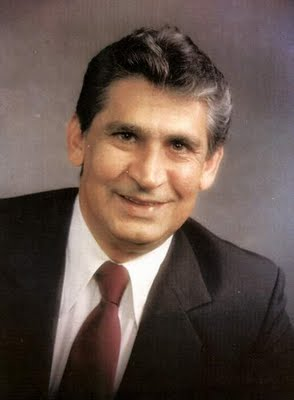
Nominee	Joaquín Balaguer	Juan Bosch
Party	PRSC	PLD
Popular vote	678,065	653,595
Percentage	35.05%	33.79%
Nominee	José Francisco Peña Gómez	Jacobo Majluta Azar
Party	PRD	PRI
Popular vote	449,399	135,659
Percentage	23.23%	7.01%
- Presidential election results by province
President before election
Joaquín Balaguer
PRSC
Elected President
Joaquín Balaguer
PRSC

General elections were held in the Dominican Republic on 16 May 1990. Following a long vote count, Joaquín Balaguer of the Social Christian Reformist Party (PSRC) was declared winner of the presidential election, whilst in the Congressional elections the PSRC received the most votes and won a majority in the Senate, although the Dominican Liberation Party won the most seats in the House of Representatives.

The voter turnout of 60% was the lowest in recent DR history.

There were numerous irregularities prior and after election day. Balaguer's victory prompted protests and accusations of fraud. This led the Central Elections Authority to introduce several reforms to the electoral law in 1992, including an increase in the number of members of the Authority and the production of a new electoral roll.

== Results ==
=== President ===
Candidate	Party	Votes	%
Joaquín Balaguer	Social Christian Reformist Party	678,065	35.05
Juan Bosch	Dominican Liberation Party	653,595	33.79
José Francisco Peña Gómez	Dominican Revolutionary Party	449,399	23.23
Jacobo Majluta	Independent Revolutionary Party	135,659	7.01
Vincho Castillo	National Progressive Force	6,063	0.31
José Rafael Abinader	Constitutional Action Party	4,926	0.25
Roberto Bernardo Saladín Selín	Christian People's Party	4,338	0.22
Luis Montás	Dominican Communist Party	1,886	0.10
Rafael Alburquerque	Party of the Dominican People	602	0.03
Total		1,934,533	100.00
Valid votes		1,934,533	97.56
Invalid/blank votes		48,356	2.44
Total votes		1,982,889	100.00
Registered voters/turnout		3,275,570	60.54
Source: Nohlen, Grullón, Ramírez Morillo

=== Congress ===
Party	Votes	%	Seats			
Party	Votes	%	House	+/–	Senate	+/–
Social Christian Reformist Party and allies (Note: PRSC allies included the Democratic Quisqueyano Party, La Estructura, the Institutional Democratic Party, the National Civic Veterans Party, MOFEI, Frente Amplio de Organizaciones Comunnales-Futuro Verde, MSDO, FDE, MAIS and Morepma)	663,127	34.64	41	–	16	–
Dominican Liberation Party–Democratic Unity	625,929	32.70	44	–	12	–
PRD–BS–PTD	447,605	23.38	33	–	2	–
Independent Revolutionary Party	139,769	7.30	2	New	0	New
PPC–MIM	8,081	0.42	0	–	0	–
National Progressive Force	18,539	0.97	0	New	0	New
Constitutional Action Party	18,539	0.97	0	New	0	New
Dominican Communist Party	18,539	0.97	0	New	0	New
Party of the Dominican People	18,539	0.97	0	New	0	New
Movement for Independence, Unity and Change	11,052	0.58	0	New	0	New
MAR	11,052	0.58	0	New	0	New
MIGRELU	11,052	0.58	0	New	0	New
MFP	11,052	0.58	0	New	0	New
MIS	11,052	0.58	0	New	0	New
Total	1,914,102	100.00	120	0	30	0
Valid votes	1,914,102	97.54				
Invalid/blank votes	48,356	2.46				
Total votes	1,962,458	100.00				
Registered voters/turnout	3,275,570	59.91				
Source: Nohlen
