= 1974 Dominican Republic general election =

← 1970	16 May 1974	1978 →
- Presidential election
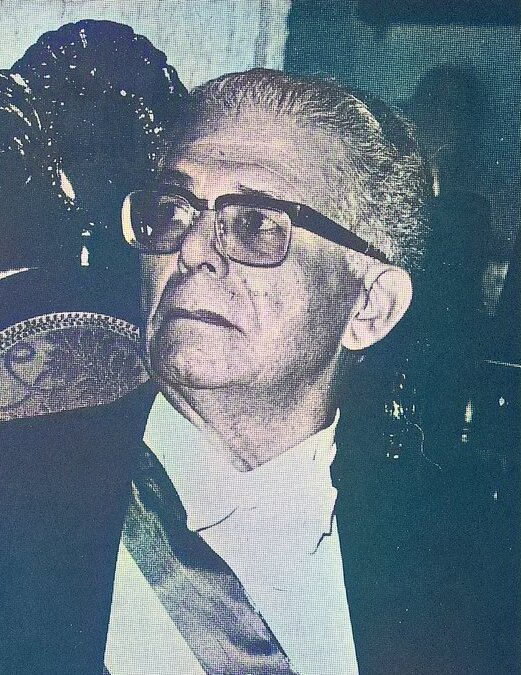

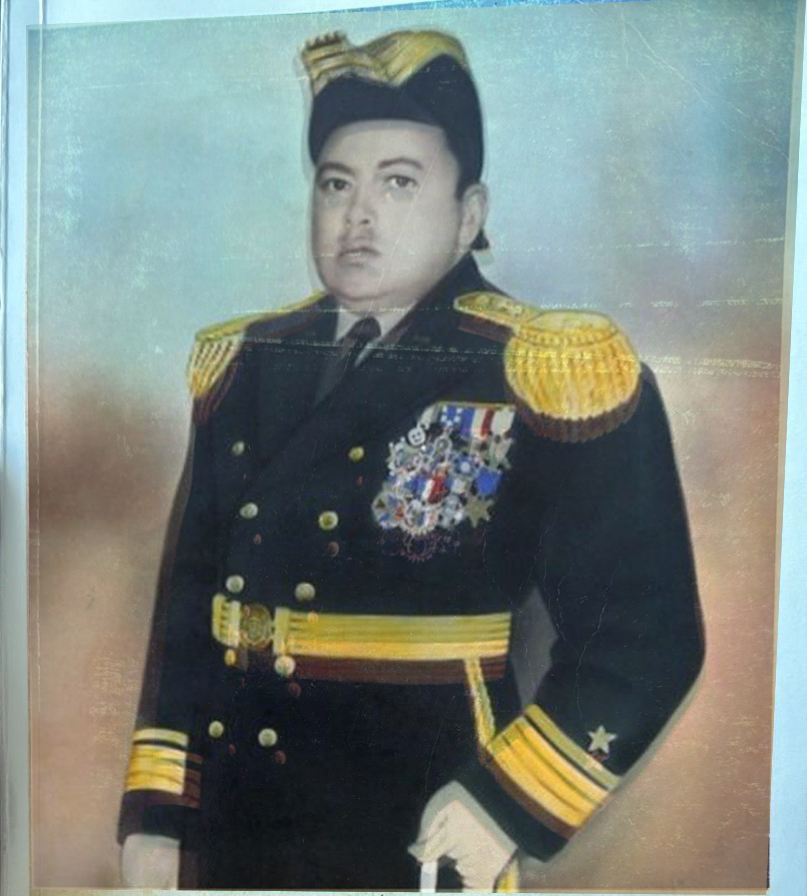
Nominee	Joaquín Balaguer	Luis Homero Lajara Burgos
Party	PR	PDP
Popular vote	942,726	170,693
Percentage	84.67%	15.33%
- Results by department
President before election
Joaquín Balaguer
PR
Elected President
Joaquín Balaguer
PR

General elections were held in the Dominican Republic on 16 May 1974. The main opposition party, the Dominican Revolutionary Party, did not contest the election, leaving only the ruling Reformist Party and some right-wing and centre-right parties. Incumbent Joaquín Balaguer won the presidential election, whilst his Reformist Party won the Congressional elections in alliance with the National Youth Movement. Voter turnout was 71.7%.

== Results ==
=== President ===
Candidate	Party	Votes	%
Joaquín Balaguer	Reformist Party	942,726	84.67
Luis Homero Lajara Burgos	People's Democratic Party	170,693	15.33
Total		1,113,419	100.00
Valid votes		1,113,419	73.33
Invalid/blank votes		404,878	26.67
Total votes		1,518,297	100.00
Registered voters/turnout		2,006,323	75.68
Source: Nohlen

=== Congress ===
Party or alliance		Votes	%	Seats			
Party or alliance		Votes	%	House	+/–	Senate	+/–
PR–MNJ	Reformist Party	929,112	89.84	75	+30	23	+2
PR–MNJ	National Youth Movement	929,112	89.84	11	–4	4	–1
People's Democratic Party		62,682	6.06	3	New	0	New
Municipal Movement of the People		42,395	4.10	1	New	0	New
People's Will Movement		42,395	4.10	1	New	0	New
Total		1,034,189	100.00	91	+17	27	0
Valid votes		1,034,189	71.87				
Invalid/blank votes		404,878	28.13				
Total votes		1,439,067	100.00				
Registered voters/turnout		2,006,323	71.73				
Source: Nohlen
