= Franklin Franco =

Franklin Franco Pichardo (14 November 1936 in Santiago de los Caballeros, Dominican Republic – 15 June 2013 in Santo Domingo, Dominican Republic) was a Dominican historian, sociologist, faculty member and politician from the Dominican Republic.

== Biography ==
Franklin Franco was born in Santiago de los Caballeros on November 14, 1936, the son of Isaías Franco and Ana Antonia Pichardo. He lived in San Francisco de Macoris up until the age of twelve, and would later move and spend the rest of his upbringing in Santo Domingo.

Persecuted for his opposition to Rafael Trujillo’s tyranny, he was forced to live in exile in Puerto Rico, Venezuela, Cuba, United States and Mexico. In 1962, after Trujillo’s assassination, he returned to the country, got involved in political party activities and joined the faculty of the Planning and Social Sciences Institute. He has been a professor of history and Director of Scientific Research at the Autonomous University of Santo Domingo and has functioned as editor of the Dominican Encyclopedia. In 1966, he received the Casa de Las American Essay Prize, in Cuba, for “Republica Dominicana: clases, crisis, y commandos”. Due to his continued research, he is considered an important figure in modern historiography and political essay.

== Bibliography ==
Franco has published the following essay books:

- República Dominicana: clases, crisis y comandos (1966)
- Negros, mulatos y la nación dominicana (1969)
- Trujillismo: génesis y rehabilitación (1971)
- Vida, pasión y muerte del PSP (1972)
- Aportación de los negros(1976)
- Duarte y la independencia nacional (1976)
- La Izquierda y el futuro dominicano (1978)
- Santo Domingo: cultura, política e ideología (1979)
- Reagan y el futuro dominicano (1980)
- Historia de las ideas políticas en República Dominicana (1981)
- Fernández Domínguez, Caamaño Deñó: El pensamiento de los militares dominicanos constitucionalistas (1985)
- Haití, de Dessalines a nuestros días (1988)
- Israel y Palestina: presente, pasado y futuro (1988)
- Era de Trujillo (1992)
- Historia del pueblo dominicano (1993)
- Historia económica y financiera de la República Dominicana, 1884-1962: introducción a su estudio (1996)
- Para aprender a Investigar (1999)
- Sobre racismo y antihaitianismo y otros ensayos (1997)
- El pensamiento Dominicano 1780 -1940 (2001)
- Ensayos profanos (2001)
