= List of Dominican secretaries of armed forces =

The minister of defense of the Dominican Republic, is the Cabinet member in charge of the Ministry of Defense, known as the secretary of armed forces before 2010. The current Dominican minister of defense is Lieutenant General Máximo William Muñoz Delgado.

== List of ministers ==
- Brigadier Antonio Jorge: (1930–1931)
- Mr. Jacinto P. Peynado: (1931–1932)
- Mr. Plinio R. Pina Chevalier: (1933)
- Mr. Francisco E. Penzo: (1933)
- Colonel Teódulo Pina Chevalier: (1933–1934)
- Major General José García: (1934–1942)
- Generalissimo Hector E. Trujillo Molina: (1942–1952)
- Lieutenant General Fausto E. Caamaño: (1952–1954)
- Generalissimo Rafael L. Trujillo Molina: (1954–1955)
- Lieutenant General José García Trujillo: (1955–1960)
- Lieutenant General José R. Román Fernández: (1960–1961)
- Major General Santo Mélido Marte Pichardo: (1961)
- Major General Francisco Gonzalez Cruz: (1961)
- Brigadier Pedro Rafael R. Rodriguez Echaverría: (1961–1962)
- Major General Victor Elby Viñas Román: (1962–1965)
- Viceadmiral Francisco Javier Rivera Caminero: (1965–1966)
- Major General Enrique Pérez y Pérez: (1966–1970)
- Major General Joaquín Méndez Lara: (1970–1971)
- Vicealmiral Ramóon Emilio Jiménez Hijo: (1971–1975)
- Major General Juan René Beauchamp Javier: (1975–1978)
- Major General Rafael A. Valdez Hilario: (1978–1980)
- Lieutenant General Pilot Mario A. Imbert McGregor: (1980–1982)
- Lieutenant General Ramiro Matos Gonzalez: (1982–1984)
- Lieutenant General Manuel A. Cuervo Gómez: (1984–1986)
- Admiral Víctor M. Barján Muffdi: (1986)
- Lieutenant General Antonio Imbert Barrera: (1986–1988)
- Lieutenant General Elías Wessin y Wessin: (1988–1991)
- Lieutenant General Héctor García Tejada: (1991–1993)
- Lieutenant General Constantino Matos Villanueva: (1993–1994)
- Admiral Iván A. Vargas Céspedes: (1994–1996)
- Lieutenant General Iván R. Hernández Oleaga: (1996)
- Lieutenant General Pilot Juan Bautista Rojas Tabar: (1996)
- Admiral Rubén Paulino Álvarez: (1996–1998)
- Lieutenant General Manuel de Jesús Florentino y Florentino: (1998–2000)
- Lieutenant General José Miguel Soto Jiménez: (2000–2004)
- Admiral Sigfrido Aramis Pared Peréz: (2004–2006)
- Lieutenant General Ramón Antonio Aquino García: (2006–2008)
- Lieutenant General Pilot Pedro R. Peña Antonio: (2008–2010)
- Lieutenant General Joaquin Virgilio Perez Feliz: (2010–2012)
- Admiral Sigfrido Aramis Pared Perez: (2012–2014)
- Lieutenant General Máximo William Muñoz Delgado (2014–)

== See also ==
Cabinet of the Dominican Republic
