= 1966 Dominican Republic general election =

- 1 June 1966
- Presidential election
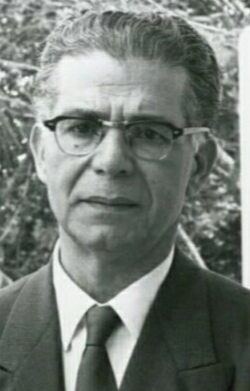

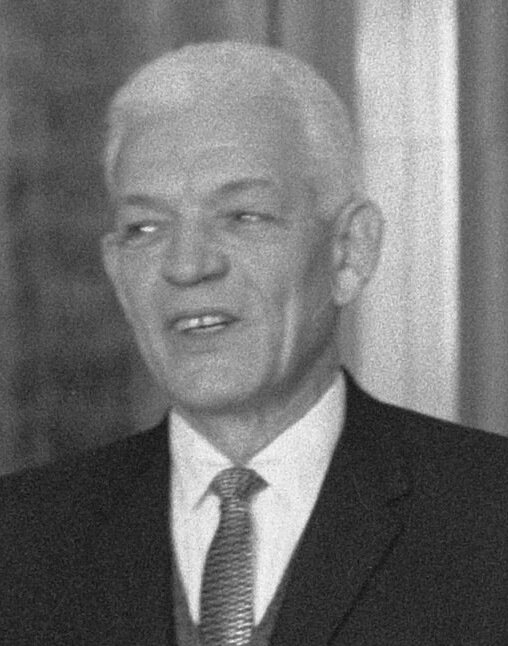
Nominee	Joaquín Balaguer	Juan Bosch
Party	PR	PRD
Popular vote	775,805	525,230
Percentage	57.66%	39.04%
- Results by department
President before election
Héctor García-Godoy
PR
Elected President
Joaquín Balaguer
PR

General elections were held in the Dominican Republic on 1 June 1966. Following the 1963 coup which toppled elected president Juan Bosch of the Dominican Revolutionary Party, supporters of his constitutional reforms were excluded from the elections, although Bosch himself contested them. The result was a victory for Joaquín Balaguer of the Reformist Party, which also won the Congressional elections. Voter turnout was 76%.

== Results ==
=== President ===
Candidate	Party	Votes	%
Joaquín Balaguer	Reformist Party	775,805	57.66
Juan Bosch	Dominican Revolutionary Party	525,230	39.04
Rafael Filiberto Bonnelly	National Integration Movement	39,535	2.94
Fourteen other candidates		4,834	0.36
Total		1,345,404	100.00
Valid votes		1,345,404	98.01
Invalid/blank votes		27,291	1.99
Total votes		1,372,695	100.00
Registered voters/turnout		1,815,429	75.61
Source: Nohlen

=== Congress ===
Party	Votes	%	Seats			
Party	Votes	%	House	+/–	Senate	+/–
Reformist Party	759,889	56.48	48	New	22	New
Dominican Revolutionary Party	494,570	36.76	26	–23	5	–17
Social Christian Revolutionary Party	30,660	2.28	0	–1	0	0
National Integration Movement	16,152	1.20	0	–20	0	–4
Dominican Revolutionary Vanguard	13,855	1.03	0	0	0	0
Christian Democratic Party	9,376	0.70	0	New	0	New
Evolutionist Liberal Party	6,540	0.49	0	New	0	New
Revolutionary Action Party	5,489	0.41	0	New	0	New
14 June Party	4,834	0.36	0	New	0	New
Democratic Revolutionary Nationalist Party	4,039	0.30	0	–4	–	–1
Total	1,345,404	100.00	74	0	27	0
Valid votes	1,345,404	98.01				
Invalid/blank votes	27,291	1.99				
Total votes	1,372,695	100.00				
Registered voters/turnout	1,815,429	75.61				
Source: Nohlen

== See also ==
- 1963 Dominican coup d'état
- Dominican Civil War
