= Francisco Augusto Lora =

Vice President of the Dominican Republic

Francisco Augusto Lora González (1910–1993), was a Dominican politician. He was the Vice-President of the Dominican Republic and a presidential candidate for several years 1966, 1970, 1974 and 1978. Serving as the Vice-President, he also was a member of President Joaquín Balaguer's Reformist Party (known as the Partido Reformista).

During political disputes of the time, in 1970 Balaguer threatened to leave the Reformist Party(PR) and decided to campaign outside of the organization. Thus, Augusto Lora was effectively forced out of the party and went on to become the leader of and ultimately the candidate for a new political party, the Movement for Democratic Integration Against Reelection (MIDA).

Lora was born in Santiago and was descended from Basilio Fondeur, a Frenchman, brother of Colonel Furcy Fondeur.

Political offices
Vacant Title last held by Manuel Joaquín Castillo	Vice President of the Dominican Republic; 1966–1970	Succeeded by Carlos Rafael Goico
