= Dominican Revolutionary Party =

Dominican Revolutionary Party Partido Revolucionario Dominicano
- Abbreviation: PRD
- President: Miguel Vargas
- General Secretary: Danilo Rafael Santos
- Spokesperson: Ruddy González (2014–present)
- Founder: Juan Bosch
- Founded: January 21, 1939; 87 years ago
- Headquarters: Avenida Jiménez Moya, Santo Domingo
- Youth wing: Juventud Revolucionaria Dominicana
- Membership (2023): 280,000
- Ideology: Populism; Factions: Third Way
- Political position: Centre to centre-left
- Regional affiliation: Center-Democratic Integration Group
- Continental affiliation: COPPPAL; São Paulo Forum
- International affiliation: Socialist International
- Colours: White; Light blue (customary)
- Slogan: Soberania Nacional, Libertad, Democracia y Justicia Social (National Sovereignty, Freedom, Democracy and Social Justice)
- Anthem: "Himno del Partido Revolucionario Dominicano" "Hymn of Dominican Revolutionary Party"
- Chamber of Deputies: 4 / 190
- Senate: 0 / 32
- Mayors: 3 / 158
- Central American Parliament: 0 / 20

Website
- www.miprd.org

The Dominican Revolutionary Party (Spanish: Partido Revolucionario Dominicano, PRD) is a political party in the Dominican Republic. Traditionally a left-of-centre party and social democratic in nature, the party has shifted since the 2000s toward the political centre. The party's distinctive color is white. Traditionally, the party has two presidents: the "Titular President" and the "Acting President" (and actually, a sort of Vice-President); until 2010 the presidents and the Secretary-General were proscribed to run for any elected office.

The party was founded in 1939 by several Dominican expatriated exiles living in Havana, Cuba, led by Juan Bosch. It was then established in the Dominican Republic on 5 July 1961. It was the first Dominican party based on populist and democratic leftist principles and an organization based on mass membership. Bosch was elected president in 1962 in what is generally believed to be the first honest election in the country's history. Bosch later left the party in a dispute over its ideological direction and founded the Dominican Liberation Party on 16 December 1973.

The PRD has won the presidency three other times—in 1978 (Antonio Guzmán), 1982 (Salvador Jorge Blanco) and 2000 (Hipólito Mejía).

At the legislative elections, on 16 May 2002, the party won 41.9% of the popular vote and 73 out of 150 seats in the Chamber of Deputies and 29 out of 31 seats in the Senate of the Dominican Republic. Its candidate at the presidential election on 16 May 2004, Hipólito Mejía, won 33.6% of the votes, failing to win a second term.

In the 16 May 2006 legislative elections, the party formed together with its traditional opponent, the Social Christian Reformist Party, and others the Grand National Alliance, that won 82 out of 178 deputies and 10 out of 32 senators. The Dominican Revolutionary Party led the alliance, however, winning about 60 seats in the chamber of deputies and 6 in the Senate.

The party has been criticized for involvement in corruption, allowing right-wing paramilitary groups to operate from its soil for attacks launched into Haiti, and for becoming an increasingly conservative party serving the interests of transnational capital over the poor majority. The last PRD president, Hipólito Mejía, has been especially criticized for supporting the Iraq War.

== Election history ==
Party logo until 2023 rebranding

=== Presidential elections ===
Election	Party candidate	First round		Second round		Result
Election	Party candidate	Votes	%	Votes	%	Result
1962	Juan Bosch	628,044	59.5%			Elected ✓
1966	Juan Bosch	525,230	39.0%			Lost ✗
1970	Did not contest election					
1974	Did not contest election					
1978	Antonio Guzmán Fernández	866,912	52.4%			Elected ✓
1982	Salvador Jorge Blanco	854,868	46.7%			Elected ✓
1986	Jacobo Majluta	828,209	39.2%			Lost ✗
1990	José Francisco Peña Gómez	449,399	23.33%			Lost ✗
1994	José Francisco Peña Gómez	1,253,179	41.6%			Lost ✗
1996	José Francisco Peña Gómez	1,130,523	38.9%	1,394,641	48.7%	Lost ✗
2000	Hipólito Mejía	1,593,231	49.87%			Elected ✓
2004	Hipólito Mejía	1,215,928	33.7%			Lost ✗
2008	Miguel Vargas	1,654,066	40.48%			Lost ✗
2012	Hipólito Mejía	2,130,189	46.95%			Lost ✗
2016	Endorsed Danilo Medina (PLD)	2,847,438	61.74%			Elected ✓
2020	Endorsed Gonzalo Castillo (PLD)	1,536,989	37.46%			Lost ✗
2024	Miguel Vargas	19,790	0.45%			Lost ✗

=== Congressional elections ===
Election	Votes	%	Chamber seats	+/–	Position	Senate seats	+/–	Position
1962	592,088	56.5%	49 / 74	▲49	▲1st	22 / 27	▲22	▲1st
1966	494,570	36.8%	26 / 91	▼23	▼2nd	5 / 91	▼17	▼2nd
1970	Did not contest election		0 / 91	▼26	N/A	0 / 27	▼5	N/A
1974	Did not contest election		0 / 91		N/A	0 / 27		N/A
1978	838,973	50.1%	48 / 91	▲48	▲1st	16 / 27	▲16	▲1st
1982	825,005	45.7%	62 / 120	▲14	1st	17 / 27	▲1	1st
1986	828,209	39.2% in alliance with PPC, MCN, UD, LE	48 / 120	▼14	▼2nd	7 / 30	▼10	▼2nd
1990	447,605	23.4% in alliance with BS and PTD	33 / 120	▼15	▼3rd	2 / 30	▼5	▼3rd
1994	1,244,441	41.9% in alliance with UD, PRI, BIS, PQD, ASD, PNVC,	57 / 120	▲24	▲1st	15 / 30	▲13	▲1st
1998	1,075,306	51.4% in alliance with UD, MCN, PPC, BIS	83 / 149	▲26	1st	24 / 30	▲9	1st
2002	963,735	42.2% in alliance with UD, ASD, PRN	73 / 150	▼10	1st	29 / 30	▲5	1st
2006	931,151	31.13% as part of the GNA	60 / 178	▼10	▼2nd	7 / 32	▼22	▼2nd
2010	1,272,536	38.44%	73 / 183	▲13	2nd	0 / 32	▼7	
2016	336,201	7.83%	16 / 190	▼61	▼4th	1 / 32	▲1	▼4th
2020	220,939	5.52%	4 / 190	▼12	4th	0 / 32	▼1	▼5th
2024	92,441	2.17%	1 / 190	▼3	4th	0 / 32		▲4th
