= Dominican Communist Party =

Defunct communist party in the Dominican Republic

Dominican Communist Party Partido Comunista Dominicano
- Founded: 1944
- Registered: 1978
- Legalized: 1961; 1965; 1978
- Banned: 1947; 1963; 1966
- Merged into: Force of the Revolution
- Newspaper: El Popular
- Ideology: Marxism-Leninism
- Political position: Left-wing

Election symbol
- the open book with a machete

The Dominican Communist Party (Spanish: Partido Comunista Dominicano) was a political party in the Dominican Republic. The party was founded in 1944 under the name Dominican Revolutionary Democratic Party. The party worked under the name Dominican Popular Socialist Party from 1946 to 1965. In August 1965 the name was again changed, to Dominican Communist Party.

== History ==
The party worked in illegality during extended periods. It was banned in 1947 was outlawed, and was subjected to brutal repression which resulted in the loss of several prominent figures. The killed party cadres included one of the founders of the party, Freddy Valdez. In June 1955, the party held a conference, which took the nature of the party congress. The congress adopted the party constitution, party programme and an elected leadership. In June 1959 the party took part in an armed uprising against the dictatorship of Rafael Trujillo. In June 1960 a party conference was organized, which discussed the situation in the country and identified the challenges the party to strengthen the struggle against government. The conference expressed strong support for the Cuban revolution.

After the fall of Trujillo in May 1961 the party intensified its activities. In September 1962 the party Central Committee adopted a document titled "On the political situation, ways and objectives of the revolution", which stressed that the strategic goal of the party was national liberation, anti-imperialist and anti-feudal revolution. During the presidency of Juan Bosch, the party strengthened its political influence and took part in the establishment of trade unions, whose leadership has now included a sizeable number of communists.

After the military coup in September 1963 the party was once again outlawed and forced underground. In March 1965 the party had put forward the slogan of restoring constitutional order and establish democratic order, a move that gained support from other oppositional forces. The party took active part in the armed struggle against the military junta and U.S. forces. The August 1965 plenum of the Central Committee of the party called on progressive forces in the country to strengthen unity and continue the fight for democratic rights of the people and for the expulsion of foreign troops from the Dominican Republic. The Plenum also decided to rename the party. PCD opposed Joaquín Balaguer government, which came to power in July 1966.

The party participated in the Moscow meetings of representatives of communist and workers parties in 1957, 1960, and signed the documents adopted by these conferences by 1965. The party also participated in the international meeting of communist and workers parties held in 1969. PCD was built on the principle of democratic centralism. It published a party organ, El Popular.

In 1975 Orlando Martinez Howley, the journalist, PCD member and prominent critic of the Balaguer regime, was murdered.

In 1996, the PCD ceased to exist and merged with the July 21 Revolutionary Force (FR 21), the Revolutionary and People's Liberation Force (FRLP) and the January 12 Liberation Movement (ML-12) to form a new party, Force of the Revolution.
