= Joaquín Balaguer =

President of the Dominican Republic (1960–1961, 1966–1978, 1986–1996)

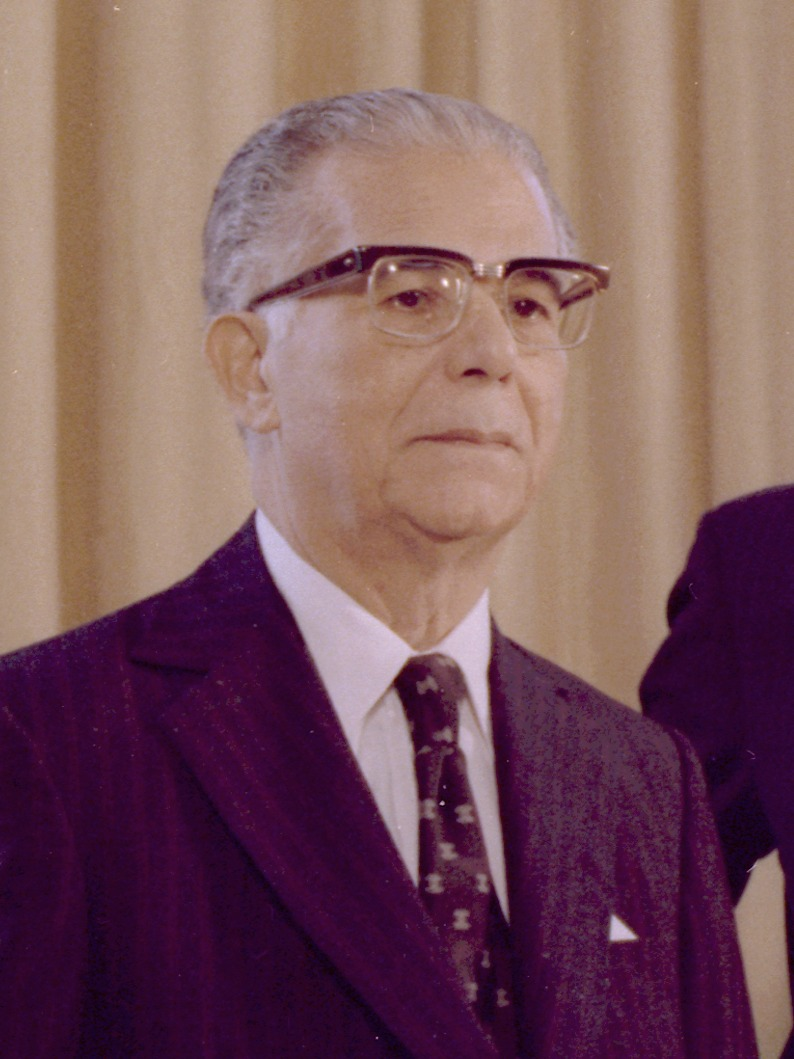
- Balaguer in 1977
- Born: 1 September 1906; Bisonó, Dominican Republic
- Died: 14 July 2002 (aged 95); Santo Domingo, Dominican Republic
- Burial place: Cementerio Cristo Redentor, Santo Domingo, Dominican Republic
- Education: Universidad Autónoma de Santo Domingo (Dr.) (Note: (Historically and still, as a matter of academic or professional tradition the title "Dr." is used before the names of lawyers who have attained this postgraduate level.) In the Dominican Republic, the title "Doctor of Laws" ("Doctor en Derecho") was traditionally the entry-level degree required to practice law (equivalent to the current "Licentiate"). Today, however, Licentiate serves as the foundational degree, while the Doctorate (Ph.D.) is a postgraduate degree representing the highest level of research.)
- Political party: Dominican Party (1930–1961); Social Christian Reformist Party (1966–1996)
- Children: 1

41st, 45th and 49th President of the Dominican Republic
- In office 16 August 1986 – 16 August 1996
- Vice President: Carlos Morales Troncoso (1986–1994); Jacinto Peynado Garrigosa (1994–1996)
- Preceded by: Salvador Jorge Blanco
- Succeeded by: Leonel Fernández
- In office 1 July 1966 – 16 August 1978
- Vice President: Francisco Augusto Lora (1966–1970); Carlos Rafael Goico Morales (1970–1978)
- Preceded by: Héctor García-Godoy
- Succeeded by: Antonio Guzmán Fernández
- In office 3 August 1960 – 16 January 1962
- Vice President: Rafael Filiberto Bonnelly
- Leader: Rafael Trujillo (1960–1961); Ramfis Trujillo (June–November 1961)
- Preceded by: Héctor Trujillo
- Succeeded by: Rafael Filiberto Bonnelly

24th Vice President of the Dominican Republic
- In office 16 August 1957 – 3 August 1960
- President: Héctor Trujillo
- Preceded by: Manuel Troncoso de la Concha
- Succeeded by: Rafael Filiberto Bonnelly

Joaquín Antonio Balaguer Ricardo (1 September 1906 – 14 July 2002) was a Dominican politician, scholar, writer, and lawyer who was the 41st, 45th and 49th president of the Dominican Republic, serving three non-consecutive terms from 1960 to 1962, 1966 to 1978, and 1986 to 1996. He previously served as the 24th vice president under President Héctor Trujillo from 1957 to 1960.

His enigmatic, secretive personality was inherited from the Trujillo era, as well as his desire to perpetuate himself in power through rigged elections and widespread human rights violations. He was considered to be a caudillo. According to Luisa de Peña Díaz, director of the Memorial Museum of Dominican Resistance, between 1966 and 1978, 11,000 people were tortured, imprisoned, forcibly disappeared or killed under his regime. This includes 1,200 political killings. Nevertheless, Balaguer was also considered to be instrumental in the liberalization of the Dominican government, and his time as leader of the Dominican Republic saw major changes such as legalized political activities, surprise army promotions and demotions, promoting health and education improvements and instituting modest land reforms.

== Early life and introduction to politics ==
Balaguer was born on 1 September 1906 in Navarrete, later named Villa Bisonó in the Santiago Province in the northwestern corner of the Dominican Republic. His father was Joaquín Jesús Balaguer Lespier, a Spaniard native of Catalan and French ancestry born in Puerto Rico, and his mother was Carmen Celia Ricardo Heureaux, daughter of Manuel de Jesus Ricardo and Rosa Amelia Heureaux (of French descent), who was also a half-cousin of President Ulises Heureaux. (Note: Ulises Heureaux's father was D'Assas Heureaux, a Haitian mulatto son of Pierre Alejandro (Pierre-Alexandre) Heureaux, a Frenchman and Roselia Jean-Louis, an African-born slave.) Balaguer was the only son in a family of several daughters.

From a very early age, Balaguer felt an attraction to literature, composing verses that were published in local magazines even when he was very young. He was taught by Santiago-born educator and feminist writer Rosa Smester Marrero; in his memoirs, Balaguer recalled Smester's great influence on his intellectual formation.

After graduating from school, Balaguer earned a law degree from the University of Santo Domingo (UASD) and studied for a brief period at the University of Paris I Pantheon-Sorbonne. As a youth, Balaguer wrote of the awe with which he was struck by his father's fellow countryman, the Harvard graduate and political leader from Puerto Rico, Pedro Albizu. Despite the profound differences regarding their ethical and world visions, Albizu's fiery and charismatic rhetoric captured Balaguer's imagination and his recollection of this occasion was a harbinger of his passion for politics and intellectual debate.

Balaguer's political career began in 1930 (before Rafael Trujillo took control of the government) when he was appointed Attorney in the Court of Properties. In later years, he served as Secretary of the Dominican Legation in Madrid (1932–1935), Undersecretary of the Presidency (1936), Undersecretary of Foreign Relations (1937), Extraordinary Ambassador to Colombia and Ecuador (1940–1943 and 1943–1947), Ambassador to Mexico (1947–1949), Secretary of Education (1949–1955), and Secretary of State of Foreign Relations (1953–1956).

== Vice presidency and first presidency (1957–1962) ==
When Trujillo arranged to have his brother Héctor re-elected to the presidency in 1957, he chose Balaguer as vice president. Three years later, when pressure from the Organization of American States (OAS) convinced Rafael that it was inappropriate to have a member of his family as president, Trujillo forced his brother to resign, and Balaguer succeeded to the post.

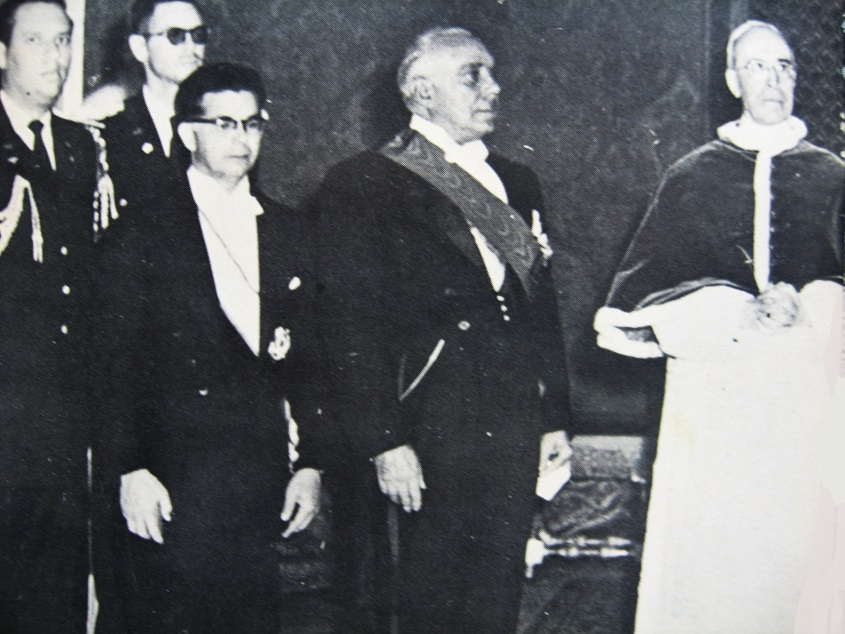
Rafael Trujillo (second from right) and Balaguer (third from right) being received in audience by Pope Pius XII (far right) in 1955

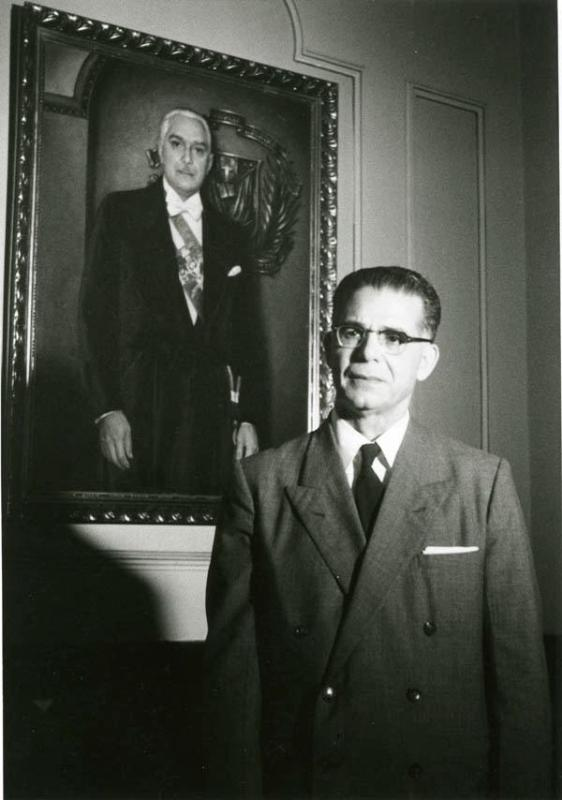
A portrait of Trujillo (left) and Balaguer (right) in 1960

The situation was dramatically altered, however, when Trujillo was assassinated in May 1961. Balaguer initially remained president, with the real power held by Trujillo's son, Ramfis. They initially took steps to liberalize the regime, granting some civil liberties and easing Trujillo's tight censorship of the press.

Meanwhile, he revoked the nonaggression pact made with Cuba in January 1961. These measures did not go nearly far enough for a populace who had no memory of the instability and poverty that preceded Trujillo, and wanted more freedom and a more equitable distribution of wealth. At the same time, Ramfis' reforms went too far for the hard-line trujillistas led by his own uncles, Héctor and José Arismendi Trujillo. As the OAS continued economic sanctions imposed for Trujillo's attempted murder of Venezuelan President Romulo Betancourt, Ramfis warned that the country could descend into civil war between left and right.

Although official and unofficial repression of the opposition parties (the Dominican Revolutionary Party and National Civic Union, as well as the communist Dominican Popular Movement) continued, Balaguer publicly condemned this repression and in September he pledged to form a coalition government. Hector and Jose Trujillo left the country in October but the opposition parties demanded Ramfis withdraw from the government as well. At the end of October, Ramfis announced that he would resign if the OAS agreed to lift the economic sanctions. The OAS agreed on November 14 but Ramfis' uncles returned to the country the following day, hoping to lead a military coup. Ramfis resigned and went into exile on November 17 and rumours circulated that Air Force general Fernando Arturo Sánchez Otero would support pro-Castro revolutionaries. The United States now sent a small fleet of ships and 1,800 marines to patrol Dominican waters. The US consul informed Balaguer that these forces stood ready to intervene at his request, and would be supported by forces from Venezuela and Colombia. Air Force general Pedro Rafael Ramón Rodríguez Echavarría announced his support for Balaguer and bombed pro-Trujillo forces. The Trujillo brothers again fled the country on November 20 and Echavarría became Secretary of Armed Forces.

The Union Civica Nacional (UCN) called a national strike and demanded the formation of a provisional government under their leader, Viriato Fiallo, with elections to be delayed until 1964. The military were vehemently against the UCN taking power and Echaverría proposed a continuation of the Balaguer regime until the elections. The American consul mediated between the two sides and in January 1962 final agreement led to the creation of a seven-member Council of State, led by Balaguer but including members of the UCN, to replace both the Dominican Congress and the President and his cabinet until the election. The OAS finally lifted sanctions against the country upon the formation of the council. However, popular unrest against Balaguer continued and many saw Echaverría as positioning himself to seize power. Military forces opened fire on demonstrators on 14 January which led to rioting the following day. On 16 January, Balaguer resigned and Echaverría staged a military coup d'état and arrested the other members of the council. With the US supporting the UCN and a new national strike beginning immediately, Echaverría was arrested by other officers two days later. The Council of State was restored under the leadership of Rafael Bonnelly and Balaguer went into exile in New York and Puerto Rico. The US State Department continued to be in contact with Balanguer, with I. Irving Davidson functioning as a liaison.

Juan Bosch was elected president in 1962 in the country's first free election. He only held office for seven months, from February 1963 to September 1963, when he was overthrown in a military coup. The country then began a tumultuous period which by 24 April 1965 saw the start of the Dominican Civil War. Military officers had revolted against the provisional Junta to restore Bosch, whereupon U.S. President Lyndon Johnson, under the pretext of eliminating Communist influence in the Caribbean, sent 42,000 U.S. troops to defeat the revolt in Operation Power Pack, on 28 April. The provisional government, headed by Héctor García-Godoy, announced general elections for 1966. Balaguer seized his chance once he had the backing of the United States government, and returned to the Dominican Republic with the purpose of destroying the popular groups that had participated in the rebellions of 1965. He formed the Reformist Party and entered the presidential race against Bosch, campaigning as a moderate conservative advocating gradual and orderly reforms. He quickly gained the support of the establishment and easily defeated Bosch, who ran a somewhat muted campaign out of fear of military retribution.

== "The Twelve Years" (1966–1978) ==
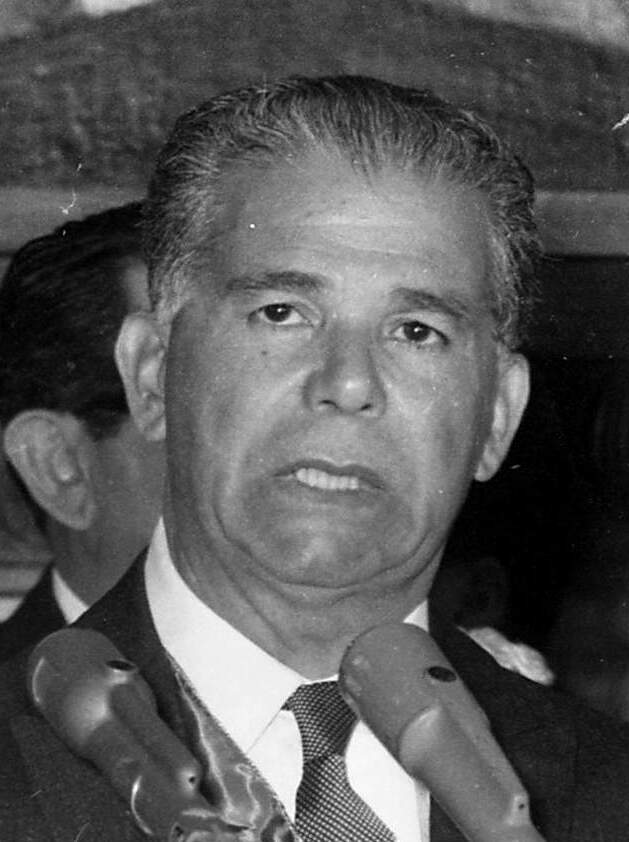
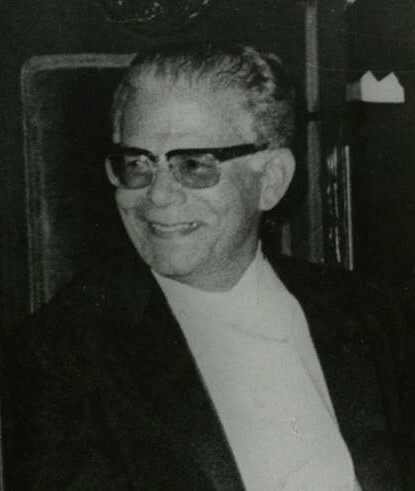
Balaguer speaking during his inauguration in 1966 (left) and in 1976 (right)

After taking office on 1 July, Balaguer found a nation severely beaten by decades of turbulence, with few short times of peace, and virtually ignorant of democracy and human rights. He sought to pacify the enmities surviving from the Trujillo regime and from the 1965 civil war, but political murders continued to be frequent during his administration. He succeeded in partially rehabilitating the public finances, which were in a chaotic state, and pushed through a modest program of economic development. He was easily reelected in 1970 against fragmented opposition and won again in 1974 after changing the voting rules in a way that led the opposition to boycott the race.

During his years as president (known popularly in Dominican politics as simply "the twelve years"), Balaguer ordered the construction of schools, hospitals, dams, roads, and many important buildings. He also presided over steady economic growth, funded public housing, opened public schools, and expanded education during his term. Additionally, over 300 politicians became millionaires during his presidency. However, his administration soon developed a distinct authoritarian cast, constitutional guarantees notwithstanding. Political opponents were jailed and sometimes killed (by one estimate, 3,000 people with center-left leanings were murdered), and opposition newspapers were occasionally seized. Despite his authoritarian methods, Balaguer had far less power than Trujillo, and his rule was considerably milder.

== Defeat and return to power ==
In 1978, Balaguer sought another term. Inflation was on the rise, and the great majority of the people had gotten little benefit from the economic boom of the past decade. Balaguer faced Antonio Guzmán, a wealthy rancher running under the banner of the Dominican Revolutionary Party. When election returns showed an unmistakable trend in Guzmán's favor, the military stopped the count. However, amid vigorous protests at home and strong pressure abroad, the count resumed. Guzmán won, marking the first defeat of Balaguer's political career. When he left office that year, it marked the first time in the Dominican Republic's history that an incumbent president peacefully surrendered power to an elected member of the opposition.

In the 1982 elections, the PRD's Salvador Jorge Blanco defeated Balaguer, who had merged his party with the Social Christian Revolutionary Party to form the Social Christian Reformist Party two years earlier.

Balaguer ran again in the 1986 elections, and took advantage of a split in the PRD and an unpopular austerity program to win the presidency again after an eight-year absence. By that time, he was 80 years old and almost completely blind after living with glaucoma for many years.

== Third presidency (1986–1996) ==
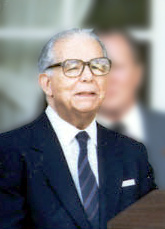
Joaquín Balaguer in 1988

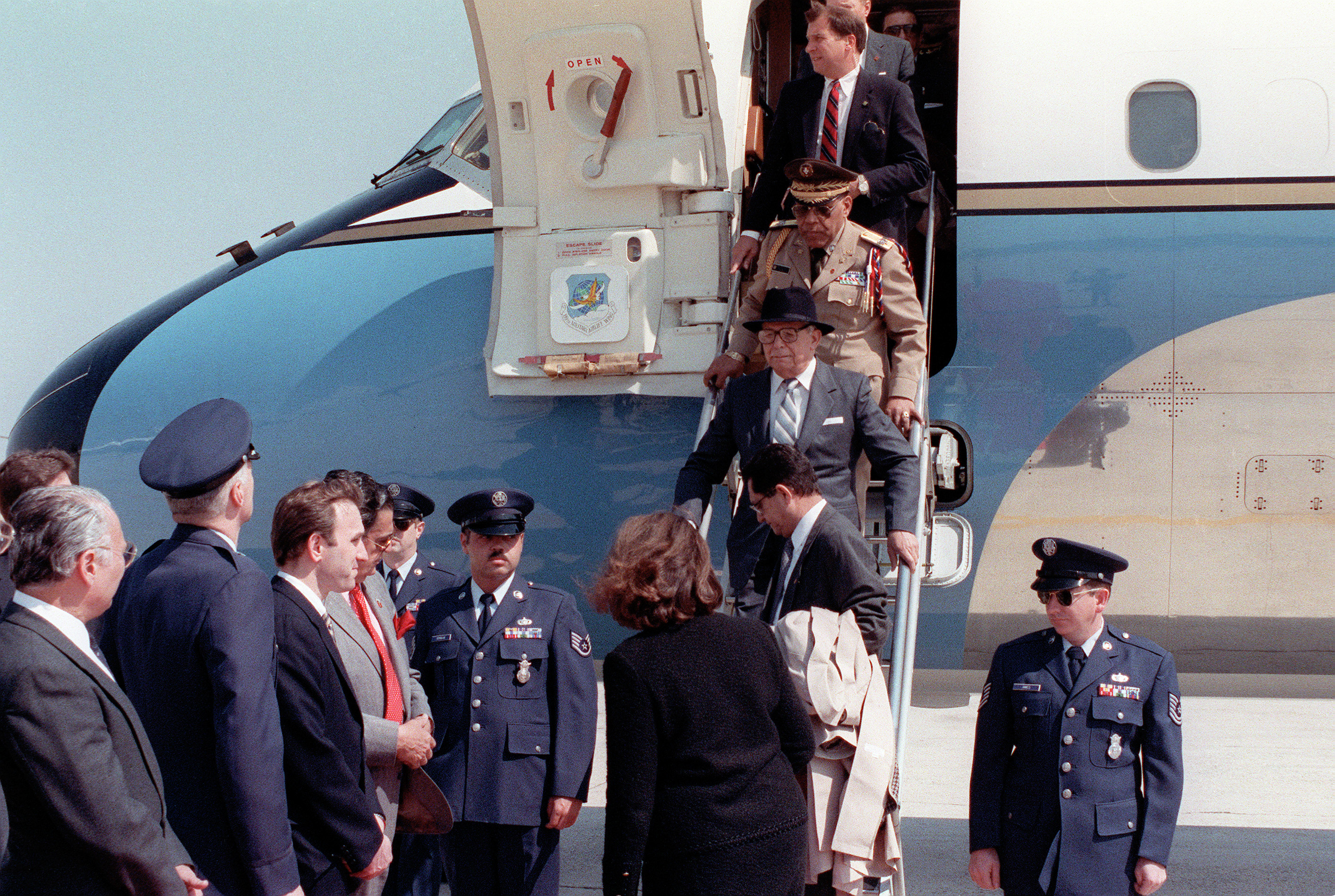
Balaguer (right) and his cabinet arrive in the US for a state visit in 1988

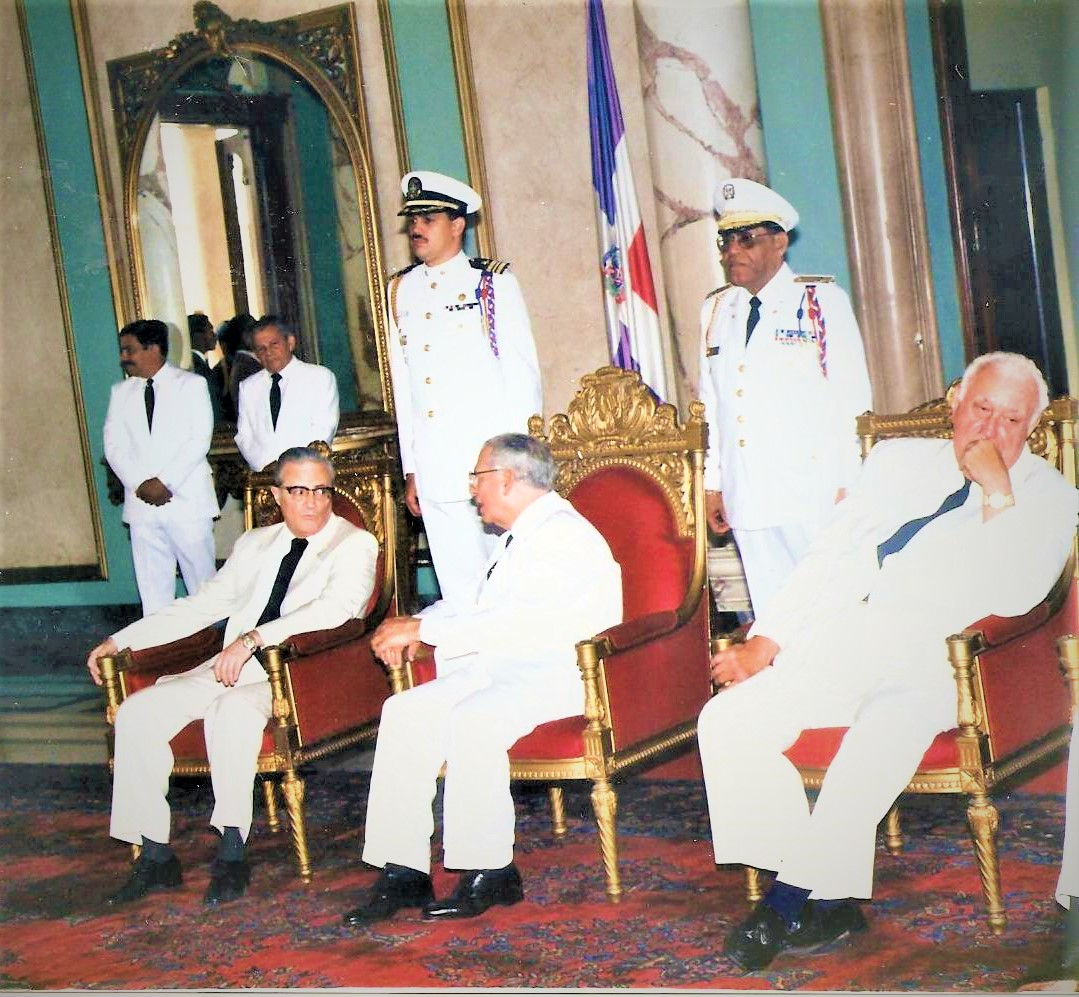
Balaguer (center) receives Ambassador Moreno Pino of Mexico at the National Palace of Santo Domingo in 1990.

Balaguer's third presidency was considerably more liberal than the "Twelve Years" had been. He was more tolerant of opposition parties and human rights.

He undertook massive infrastructure projects, such as the construction of highways, bridges, schools, housing projects and hospitals. Following the style of Trujillo, these highly visible projects were much publicized over government-controlled media and through grandiose public ceremonies designed to enhance Balaguer's popularity. The projects were also used as a means to reward his political supporters with lucrative public works contracts. The economy also improved considerably.

Balaguer was narrowly reelected in the elections of 1990, defeating his old foe Juan Bosch by only 22,000 votes out of 1.9 million votes cast amid charges of fraud.

For the 500th anniversary of Christopher Columbus' landing in the Americas and the visit of Pope John Paul II, Balaguer spent millions on a restoration of parts of historic, colonial Santo Domingo, and on sprucing up the parts of the city to be transversed by the pope, including the construction of a grand new avenue lined with modern housing blocks.

More controversial was that Balaguer spent two hundred million US dollars on the construction of a massive ten-story Columbus Lighthouse. Completed in 1992, the Columbus Lighthouse was designed to beam the image of a Christian cross into the night sky and to be visible for tens of miles. Since completion, the Columbus Lighthouse, which supposedly houses Columbus's remains, has been a minor tourist attraction. Its light has almost never been used due to extremely high energy costs and frequent blackouts in the country. In the 1994 elections, Balaguer decided to run again for the presidency, even though he was almost 90 years old and completely blind. This time, his most prominent opponent was José Francisco Peña Gómez of the PRD.

The campaign was one of the nastiest in Dominican history. Balaguer frequently played up Peña Gómez' Haitian ancestry to his advantage. Balaguer claimed that Peña would try to merge the country with Haiti if elected. When the returns were announced, Balaguer was announced as the winner by only 30,000 votes. However, many PRD supporters showed up to vote only to discover their names had vanished from the rolls. Peña Gómez declared fraud and called a general strike. Demonstrations took place in support of the strike.

An investigation later revealed that the electoral board did not know the total number of registered voters, and the voting lists distributed at polling stations did not match those given to the parties. The investigation also revealed that about 200,000 people had been removed from the polls. Amid such questions about the poll's legitimacy, Balaguer agreed to hold new elections in 1996—in which he would not be a candidate. It would be the first presidential election since 1966 in which Balaguer's name did not appear on the ballot.

In the 1996 elections, Balaguer's vice president, Jacinto Peynado, finished well short of making it to the runoff. Balaguer then threw his support to the Dominican Liberation Party's Leonel Fernández in an unusual coalition with Bosch, his political foe of over 30 years.

== Death and legacy ==
In 2000, Balaguer sought the presidency yet again. Although by this time he could not walk without assistance, he nonetheless plunged into the campaign, well aware that his large reservoir of supporters could mean the difference in the election. He won around 23% of the votes in the election, with PLD candidate Danilo Medina just barely nosing him out for a spot in the runoff with PRD candidate Hipólito Mejía, who came just a few thousand votes short of outright victory. Balaguer stated that he himself personally accepted Mejía's election, but hinted that his supporters would split their votes between Mejía and Medina in the runoff. Medina would have needed nearly all of Balaguer's supporters to cross over to him in order to have any realistic chance of overcoming a 25-point deficit in the first round. When it was apparent Medina would not get nearly enough support from Balaguer's voters to have a chance at victory, he pulled out of the runoff, handing the presidency to Mejía.

He died of heart failure on July 14, 2002 at Santo Domingo's Abreu Clinic at the age of 95.

Despite his image as a standard Latin American caudillo, Balaguer at the same time developed a legacy as a great reformer. His land reform policies were praised for successfully distributing land to peasants and earned him support from the country's rural population.

Ronald Reagan said "[...] Balaguer has been a driving force throughout his country's democratic development. In 1966 he led democracy's return to the Dominican Republic after years of political uncertainty and turmoil. Indeed, he is, in many ways, the father of Dominican democracy." Jimmy Carter said "President Balaguer has set an example for all leaders in this nation in changing his own country and his own people away from a former totalitarian government to one of increasingly pure democracy."

A metro station in Santo Domingo is named after him.

He is one of the central characters in Mario Vargas Llosa's novel The Feast of the Goat.

== Bibliography ==
Balaguer was a prolific author, who wrote many books for contemporary Dominican literature. His most famous work was his only narrative novel, called "Los Carpinteros" (The Charpenters). The most controversial of his works is perhaps "Memorias de un Cortesano en la Era de Trujillo", in which Balaguer, shielded by his political power admitted knowing the truth about the death of the revolutionary journalist Orlando Martínez. Balaguer left a blank page in the middle of the book to be filled in at the time of his death.

Balaguer explored several branches of literature. As a thorough researcher, he published many biographical books still used as reference, along with compilations and analysis of Dominican folk poets. As a poet, he was mostly of Post-Romantic influence, and his style remained strictly unchanged along his long career. Other themes, despite the sorrow expressed, are mostly noble: and idyllic view of nature, nostalgia, and memoirs of the past.

His total list of literary works is as follows:

- Salmos paganos (1922)
- Claro de luna (1922)
- Tebaida lírica (1924)
- Nociones de métrica castellana (1930)
- Azul en los charcos (1941)
- La realidad dominicana (1941)
- El Tratado Trujillo‑Hull y la liberación financiera de la República Dominicana (1941)
- La política internacional de Trujillo (1941)
- Guía emocional de la ciudad romántica (1944)
- Letras dominicanas (1944)
- Heredia, verbo de la libertad (1945)
- Palabras con acentos rítmicos (1946)
- Realidad dominicana. Semblanza de un país y un régimen (1947)
- Los próceres escritores (1947)
- Semblanzas literarias (1948)
- En torno de un pretendido vicio prosódico de los poetas hispanoamericanos (1949)
- Literatura dominicana (1950)
- El Cristo de la libertad (1950)
- Federico García Godoy (antología, 1951)
- El principio de alternabilidad en la historia dominicana (1952)
- Juan Antonio Alix: Décimas (Prólogo y recopilación, 1953)
- Consideración acerca de la producción e inversión de nuestros impuestos (1953)
- Apuntes para una historia prosódica de la métrica castellana (1954)
- El pensamiento vivo de Trujillo (1955)
- Historia de la literatura dominicana (1956)
- Discursos. Panegíricos, política y educación política internacional (1957)
- Colón, precursor literario (1958)
- El centinela de la frontera. Vida y hazañas de Antonio Duvergé (1962)
- El Reformismo: filosofía política de la revolución sin sangre (1966)
- Misión de los intelectuales (Discurso, 1967)
- Con Dios, con la patria y con la libertad (Discurso, 1971)
- Conjura develada (Discurso, 1971)
- Ante la tumba de mi madre (1972)
- Temas educativos y actividades diplomáticas (1973)
- La marcha hacia el Capitolio (1973)
- Discursos. Temas históricos y literarios (1973)
- Temas educativos y actividades diplomáticas (1974)
- Cruces iluminadas (1974)
- La palabra encadenada (1975)
- Martí, crítica e interpretación (1975)
- La cruz de cristal (1976)
- Discursos escogidos (1977)
- Discurso en el develamiento de la estatua del poeta Fabio Fiallo (1977)
- Juan Antonio Alix, crítica e interpretación (1977)
- Pedestales. Discursos históricos (1979)
- Huerto sellado. Versos de juventud (1980)
- Mensajes al pueblo dominicano (1983)
- Entre la sangre del 30 de mayo y la del 24 de abril (1983)
- La isla al revés (1983)
- Galería heroica (1984)
- Los carpinteros (1984)
- La venda transparente (1987)
- Memorias de un cortesano de la «Era de Trujillo» (1988)
- Romance del caminante sin destino (Enrique Blanco) (1990)
- Voz silente (1992)
- De vuelta al capitolio 1986‑1992 (1993)
- España infinita (1997)
- Grecia eterna (1999)
- La raza inglesa (2000)

== Notes ==
Political offices
Preceded by Héctor B. Trujillo	President of the Dominican Republic; 1960–1962	Succeeded by Civic-Military Council
Preceded by Héctor García-Godoy (provisional)	President of the Dominican Republic; 1966–1978	Succeeded by Antonio Guzmán
Preceded by Salvador Jorge Blanco	President of the Dominican Republic; 1986–1996	Succeeded by Leonel Fernández
Preceded by Manuel Troncoso de la Concha	Vice President of the Dominican Republic; 1957–1960	Vacant Title next held by Rafael Filiberto Bonnelly
