= Cabral (surname) =

Cabral is a surname of Portuguese origin, coming from the word Cabra meaning goat. The surname Cabral most commonly came from goat farmers.

Notable people with the surname include:

- Amílcar Cabral (1924–1973), Bissau-Guinean and Cape Verdean anti-colonial leader
- Andrea Cabral (born 1959), American politician
- Anna Escobedo Cabral (born 1959), American businesswoman, 42nd U.S. Treasurer
- António Bernardo da Costa Cabral, 1st Marquis of Tomar (1803–1889), Portuguese statesman
- Artur de Sacadura Cabral (1881–1924), Portuguese aviation pioneer
- Cathy Cabral (1962–2025), Filipino civil engineer
- César Cabral (born 1989), Dominican professional baseball player
- Chrystia Cabral (born 1991), American musician known professionally as Spellling
- Ciruelo Cabral (born 1963), Argentine fantasy artist
- Cristina Rodríguez Cabral (born 1959), Uruguayan poet, researcher, and Afro-Uruguayan activist
- Daniel Cabral (born 2002), Brazilian footballer
- Donald Reid Cabral (1923–2006), President of the Dominican Republic
- Esperanza Cabral, 21st century Filipino politician
- Evaldo Cabral de Mello (born 1936), Brazilian historian and history writer
- Facundo Cabral (1937–2011), Argentine singer and songwriter
- Fito Cabrales, Spanish songwriter, singer and guitarist
- Flávio Cabral (1918–1990), American painter
- Francisco Cabral (Jesuit) (1529–1609), Portuguese Jesuit missionary in Japan
- Gloria Cabral (born 1982), Brazilian-Paraguayan architect
- Gonçalo Velho Cabral (15th century), Portuguese monk and explorer
- Hélder Cabral (born 1984), Portuguese footballer
- João Bosco Cabral (born 1975), Timorese professional footballer
- João Cabral (born 1599), Portuguese Catholic missionary, seeker of the mystical land of Shambhala
- João Cabral de Melo Neto (1920–1999), Brazilian poet and diplomat
- João de Pina-Cabral, Portuguese anthropologist
- José María Cabral (1816–1899), Dominican military figure and politician
- José María Cabral Bermúdez (1902–1984), Dominican lawyer and businessman
- José María Cabral y Báez (1864–1937), Dominican lawyer, businessman and politician
- Juan Bautista Cabral (1789–1813), Argentine soldier
- Len Cabral, United States storyteller
- Lília Cabral (born 1957), Brazilian actress
- Luís Cabral (1931–2009), first President of Guinea-Bissau
- Manuel Caldeira Cabral (born 1968), Portuguese politician
- Manuel del Cabral (1907–1999), Dominican writer
- Marcos Antonio Cabral (1842–1903), Dominican military officer, writer, speaker and politician
- Maria da Conceição Nobre Cabral, Guinea-Bissau politician
- Mario Fermín Cabral y Báez (1877–1961), Dominican politician
- Mercedes Cabral (born 1986), Filipina actress
- Miguel de Sacadura Cabral Portas, Portuguese left-wing politician
- Nilesh Cabral, Indian politician
- Pape Cabral (born 2007), French footballer
- Paulo de Sacadura Cabral Portas, Portuguese right-wing politician
- Pedro Álvares Cabral (1467–1520), Portuguese discoverer of Brazil
- Peggy Cabral (born 1947), Dominican journalist, television host, politician and diplomat
- Roxanne Cabral, US diplomat
- Sérgio Cabral (1937–2024), Brazilian journalist, writer, composer and researcher
- Sérgio Cabral Filho (born 1963), Brazilian politician and journalist

== Sports ==
- Adilson Tavares Varela, commonly known as Cabral, Cape Verdean football player
- Alejandro Cabral, Argentine footballer
- Brian Cabral, American footballer
- Cabral Ferreira, Portuguese football club president
- Carlos Alberto Cabral, Brazilian football manager
- Cristian Martins Cabral, Brazilian footballer
- Gustavo Cabral, Argentine footballer
- Jerson Cabral, Dutch footballer
- Kévin Cabral, French footballer
- Mário de Araújo Cabral, Portuguese racing driver
- Milagros Cabral, Dominican Republic volleyball player
- Paulo Cabral, Portuguese footballer
- Rémi Cabral, French footballer
- Vinícius Cabral, Brazilian para athlete
