= Manuel Díez Cabral =

Dominican businessman

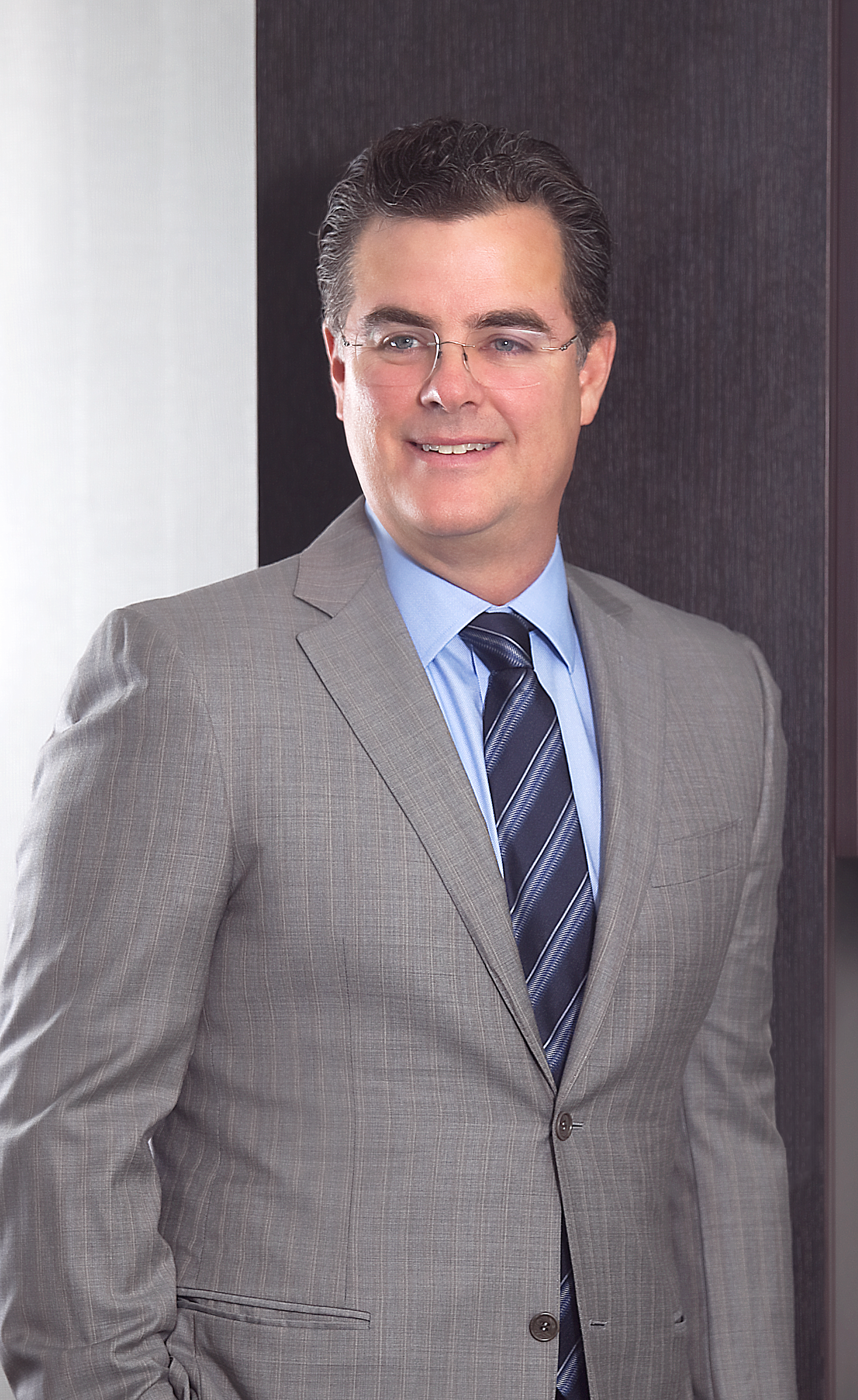
- Born: Manuel Díez Cabral; July 16, 1964 (age 62); Santo Domingo, Dominican Republic
- Education: (United States) Williams College
- Organization: Consejo Nacional de la Empresa Privada

Manuel Vicente Díez Cabral (born July 16, 1964 in Santo Domingo) is a Dominican businessman and entrepreneurial leader.

== Career ==
Díez is chief executive and chairman of Diesco, Ltd., and chairman of the board of directors of Cristalia Premium Water, Puerto Rico’s largest bottled water brand company. Also he is chairman of the Consejo Nacional de la Empresa Privada, an organization that agglomerates the entrepreneurship in the Dominican Republic, and chairman of the board of trustees of the Barna Business School. Díez was chairman of the Asociación de Industrias de la República Dominicana (AIRD) and the Asociación Nacional de Jóvenes Empresarios (ANJE).

== Family ==
Díez Cabral comes from a distinguished family. His mother is cousin of President Donald Reid Cabral, kinswoman of writer and diplomat Julio Vega Battle, beauty queen Amelia Vega, anthropologist Bernardo Vega, actress Sarah Jorge León, businessman José Armando Bermúdez Rochet (founder of Bermúdez rum company), poet and diplomat Fabio Fiallo Cabral, and businessman Juan Bautista Vicini Cabral, and descendant of Presidents Marcos Antonio Cabral, Buenaventura Báez, José María Cabral y Luna and Ulises Espaillat.

Ancestors of Manuel Díez Cabral

2. Manuel Vicente Díez Méndez
1. Manuel Vicente Díez Cabral
24. Marcos Ezequiel Antonio Cabral y Figueredo (1842–1903)
12. José María Cabral y Báez (1864–1937)
25. Altagracia Amelia Báez Andújar (†1879)
6. José María Cabral Bermúdez (1902–1984)
26. Erasmo Bermúdez Jiménez (1825-1907)
13. María Petronila Bermúdez Rochet (1872-1942)
27. María Petronila Rochet Gómez (1839–1889)
3. María Josefina Cabral Vega
28. José Rafael Vega Pichardo (1844–1897)
14. José Nicolás Vega Llenas (1867–1925)
29. María Amelia Llenas Díaz (1847–1920)
7. Mercedes Amalia Vega Batlle (1909–2004)
30. Josep Joaquim Antoni Battle i Filbà (1844–1899)
15. María Asunción Batlle Espaillat (1876–1972)
31. María Dolores Espaillat Espaillat

He is married to Aída Natalie Hazoury Toca (daughter of Romes Hazoury Tomes, Lebanese, and Aída Odette Altagracia Toca Simó, Dominican) and has fathered 2 girls: Daniela Amalia Díez Hazoury and Natalie Sofía Díez Hazoury.
