= Peggy Cabral =

Dominican Republic television personality, diplomat and politician (born 1947)

Vice-Minister of Foreign Affairs of the Dominican Republic
- In office 13 December 2019 – 16 August 2020
- President: Danilo Medina
- Minister: Miguel Vargas

Ambassador of the Dominican Republic to the Italian Republic
- In office 28 October 2015 – 13 December 2019
- Preceded by: Vinicio A. Tobal Ureña
- Succeeded by: Rafael A. Tejeda Acevedo

Vice-Mayor of the National District
- In office 16 May 1998 – 16 May 2002 Serving with Johnny Ventura (Mayor)
- Preceded by: Johnny Ventura
- Succeeded by: Margarita Álvarez de Peynado

Personal details
- Born: Alba María Antonia Cabral Cornero; 26 June 1947 (age 79) Buenos Aires, Argentina
- Party: Dominican Revolutionary Party (Current)
- Spouse(s): Diego Fidel Raúl Degaudenzi Rizzo (?); José Francisco Peña Gómez (1986–1998)
- Children: Diego Fidel Antonio Degaudenzi Cabral, Sebastián Atilio Antonio Degaudenzi Cabral, Natacha Antonieta Degaudenzi Cabral
- Parent(s): Manuel del Cabral (father); Alba Cornero (mother)
- Relatives: Adriano Espaillat (half-cousin); Mario Fermín Cabral y Báez (grandfather); José María Cabral y Báez (granduncle); Juan Bautista Vicini Cabral (second cousin)
- Education: University of Buenos Aires
- Peggy Cabral on X

Alba María Antonia Cabral Cornero (born 26 June 1947), known as Peggy, is a Dominican journalist, television host, politician and diplomat. Cabral was co-president of the Dominican Revolutionary Party from 2013 to 2020; she also was vice-mayor of the National District (1998–2002). She served as Vice-Minister of Foreign Affairs of the Dominican Republic from 2019 to 2020. She is José Francisco Peña Gómez's widow.

== Early life and family ==
Peggy is daughter of the Argentine journalist of Spanish descent Alba María Cornero, a native of Rosario, and Dominican writer and diplomat Manuel del Cabral of colonial Spanish and colonial French descent; she was born in Buenos Aires while her father was serving in the Embassy of the Dominican Republic to Argentina.

Cabral comes from a prominent political family in the Dominican Republic, which has had several presidents, including Buenaventura Báez, Ramón Báez, José María Cabral, Marcos Cabral, and Donald Reid-Cabral. Her grandfather, Sen. Mario Fermín Cabral y Báez drafted the bill that in 1935 renamed the Dominican capital, Santo Domingo, for Trujillo City in honor of dictator Rafael Trujillo. She was also second cousin of late businessman Juan Bautista Vicini Cabral and is a half-cousin of United States congressman Adriano Espaillat.

In the late 1950s her father defected to Argentina and received political asylum, where the Cabral family lived for 17 years before returning to the Dominican Republic, except for a sister of Peggy who remained in Argentina.

She married young to Diego Fidel Raúl Degaudenzi Rizzo, an Argentine of Italian descent, with whom she had three children, who have given to them twelve grandchildren, including author Manuel Vallejo. Degaudenzi and Cabral divorced. Cabral remarried on 19 December 1986 to Dominican politician José Francisco Peña Gómez, of whom she's the widow . She studied business administration at the University of Buenos Aires. During her youth she lived in Argentina, Spain, Chile and Brazil.

Ancestors of Peggy Cabral

16. José María Cabral y Luna (1816–1899)
8. Marcos Ezequiel Antonio Cabral y Figueredo (1843-1903)
17. Águeda Figueredo Rivera (1821–1877)
4. Mario Fermín Cabral y Báez (1877–1961)
18. Buenaventura Báez Méndez (1812–1884)
9. Altagracia Amelia Báez Andújar (†1879)
19. María Fermina Andújar de Soto
2. Manuel Antonio Cabral Tavárez (1907–1999)
20. Manuel de Jesús Tavares Reyes
10. Vicente Trinidad Tavares Portes (1839–?)
21. María Altagracia Portes y Morell de Santa Cruz
5. Amelia Josefa Tavares Saviñón (1877–1924)
22. Rafael Saviñón
11. María de la Antigua Saviñón Villa (ca.1848–1906)
23. María Lorenza Matilde Villa del Orbe (1818–?)
1. Alba María Cabral Cornero
3. Alba Cornero

== Political career ==
She was the Dominican Revolutionary Party candidate for the senate seat of the San Cristóbal province to the congressional elections in 2010, she got 41.07% of the votes, being defeated by the incumbent Tommy Galán.

In August 2013, she was designated acting president of the Dominican Revolutionary Party.

In late 2015, Cabral was appointed Dominican Republic ambassador to Italy.

== Awards and honours ==
She has received several awards throughout her life, including:

- Llaves de la ciudad de Paterson, New Jersey
- Medalla al Mérito en el Renglón Político, impuesta por el entonces presidente de la República Dominicana, Hipólito Mejía
- Orden de Don José Solano y Bote (Venezuela)
- Huésped de Honor de las ciudades de La Plata y Rosario (Argentina)
- Personaje del año 2003 (Movimiento Cultural Dominicano)
