= José María Cabral Bermúdez =

City councilman (Santiago)
- In office 1932–1940

José Mª. Cabral Bermúdez
- Born: 13 April 1902; Santiago de los Caballeros, Dominican Republic
- Died: 26 May 1984 (aged 82)
- Education: Universidad de Santo Domingo (1927)
- Occupation: Lawyer
- Board member of: Banco de Reservas
- Spouse: Mercedes Amalia Vega Batlle
- Children: María Josefina, José María, Petrica, Marco Buenaventura
- Parent(s): José María Cabral y Báez (father), María Petronila Bermúdez Rochet (mother)
- Relatives: Buenaventura Báez (great-grandfather), Manuel Díez Cabral (grandson), Donald Reid Cabral (nephew), Manuel del Cabral (cousin), Julio Vega Batlle (brother-in-law), Juan Bautista Vicini Cabral (nephew), José León Asensio (son-in-law)

José María Cabral Bermúdez (1902–1984) was a lawyer and businessman from the Dominican Republic. Cabral was member of the first junta that ruled the Dominican Republic after the fall of the dictatorship of Rafael Trujillo.

== Biography ==
He was born into an upper class family, and was in his days the most important oligarch of the Dominican Republic.

Cabral Bermúdez was vice-president of the Reserve Bank of the Dominican Republic, and member of the administrative council of Ingenio Cristóbal Colón, a sugar company.

== Ancestry ==
Ancestors of José María Cabral Bermúdez

16. Juan Marcos Cabral y Aybar (1792–1853); Hincha, Colony of Santo Domingo
8. Melchor María Cabral y Luna (1815–?); Baní, Colony of Santo Domingo
17. María Ramona de Luna y Andújar (1787–1877); Hincha, Colony of Santo Domingo
4. Marcos Ezequiel Antonio Cabral y Figueredo (1842-1903); Baní, Ozama Department, Haiti
18. Gervasio Figueredo Lamsar; Bánica, Colony of Santo Domingo
9. Águeda Figueredo Rivera (1821–1877); Hincha, Colony of Santo Domingo
19. Micaela Rivera Figueredo; Hincha, Colony of Santo Domingo
2. José María Cabral y Báez (1877–1961); Baní, Dominican Republic
20. Pablo Altagracia Báez (†1840); Azua, Colony of Santo Domingo
10. Ramón Buenaventura Báez Méndez (1812–1884); Cabral, Colony of Santo Domingo
21. Teresa de Jesús Méndez (1788–1873); Cabral, Colony of Santo Domingo
5. Altagracia Amelia Báez Andújar (†1879)
22. Juan Pablo Andújar de Soto; Hincha, Colony of Santo Domingo
11. María Fermina Andújar de Soto; Hincha, Colony of Santo Domingo
23. María Francisca de Soto Fernández; Hincha, Colony of Santo Domingo
1. José María Cabral Bermúdez (1902–1984); Santiago de los Caballeros, Dominican Republic
12. Nicolás Bermúdez (1798–?); Colony of Venezuela
6. Erasmo Bermúdez Jiménez (1825–1907); Valencia, Venezuela
13. Bárbara Jiménez (1802–?); Colony of Venezuela
3. María Petronila Bermúdez Rochet (1872-1942); Santiago de los Caballeros, Dominican Republic
28. Antoine Joseph Rochette Barthelemy (1765–1836); Flawinne, Belgium
14. Cristophe Rochette Sellier (1796–?); Metz, France
29. Élisabeth Sellier Laurent (1767–1831); Meurthe-et-Moselle, France
7. María Petronila Rochet Gómez (1839–1889); Santiago de los Caballeros, Cibao Department, Haiti
30. Juan Pablo Gómez; Colony of Santo Domingo
15. Mauricia Gómez Pérez (1809–1889); Colony of Santo Domingo
31. María Inocencia Pérez Plata; Colony of Santo Domingo
