= Juan Bautista Vicini Cabral =

Italian-Dominican businessman

Juan Bautista 'Gianni' Vicini Cabral (Genoa, 7 April 1924–Santo Domingo, 27 April 2015) was an Italian-born Dominican businessman and chairman of the sugar company Grupo Vicini, the largest Dominican Republic corporation.

== Biography ==
Vicini was born on 7 April 1924 in Genoa, Italy, during a vacation of his family, to the Italian-Dominican businessman Felipe Augusto Vicini Perdomo (the son of Italian businessman Giovanni Battista Vicini and half-brother of President Juan Bautista Vicini Burgos) and Dominican heiress Amelia María Cabral Bermúdez (daughter of José María Cabral y Báez and sister of José María Cabral Bermúdez). His siblings were: Laura Amelia (1925–2006), who married Amadeo Barletta Ricart, the son of Amadeo Barletta Barletta; José María (1926–2007), who married María Elena Pérez Branger; and Felipe de Jesús Vicini Cabral (1936–1997). He was first cousin of Donald Reid Cabral, President de facto of the Dominican Republic, first cousin-once removed of José María Cabral, film director, and second cousin of Peggy Cabral, vice mayor of Santo Domingo.

He married Alma Stella Altagracia Lluberes Henríquez (1936–1992), the daughter of Mario Rafael Lluberes Abréu and Josefa Stella Henríquez Vásquez (a granddaughter of intellectual Federico Henríquez y Carvajal and diplomat Francisco Leonte Vásquez Lajara; the latter was brother of President Horacio Vásquez Lajara). They had 3 children: Felipe Augusto Antonio (b. 1960), Amelia Stella María (b. 1974), and Juan Bautista Vicini Lluberes (b. 1975).

In 1936 his father died and Vinici became the chairman of Grupo Vicini, one of the largest sugar companies in the Dominican Republic. During his tenure, Grupo Vicini became the main private sugar producer and afterwards the most important corporation in the Dominican Republic, with investments in many key economic sectors.

Ancestors of Juan Bautista Vicini Cabral

16. Giovanni Battista Vicini
8. Angelo Maria Vicini (1799–1883)
17. Maria Porcella
4. Juan Bautista Vicini Cánepa (1847–1900); Zoagli, Republic of Genoa
9. Anna Canepa
2. Felipe Augusto Vicini Perdomo (1883–1936); Santo Domingo, Dominican Republic
20. Manuel Perdomo Castillo (1790–1858)
10. Felipe Perdomo Luna (1806–1872)
21. María de la O Luna Andújar (1784–1849)
5. Mercedes Laura Perdomo Santamaría; Santo Domingo
11. María del Carmen Santamaría
1. Juan Bautista Vicini Cabral (1924–2015); Santo Domingo, Dominican Republic
24. Melchor María Cabral y Luna (1815–?); Baní, Colony of Santo Domingo
12. Marcos Ezequiel Antonio Cabral y Figueredo (1842–1903)
25. Águeda Figueredo Rivera (1821–?); Baní, Colony of Santo Domingo
6. José María Cabral y Báez (1864–1937); Baní, Dominican Republic
26. Ramón Buenaventura Báez Méndez (1812–1884); Cabral, Colony of Santo Domingo
13. Altagracia Amelia Báez Andújar (†1879)
27. María Fermina Andújar de Soto; Baní, Colony of Santo Domingo
3. Amelia María Cabral Bermúdez (1899–1996); Santiago de los Caballeros, Dominican Republic
28. Nicolás Bermúdez (1798–?); Colony of Venezuela
14. Erasmo Bermúdez Jiménez (1825–1907); Villa de Cura, Venezuela
29. Bárbara Jiménez (1802–?); Colony of Venezuela
7. María Petronila Bermúdez Rochet (1872–1942)
30. Cristophe Rochette Sellier (1796–?); Metz, French First Republic
15. María Petronila Rochet Gómez (1839–1889)
31. Mauricia Gómez Pérez (1809–1889)

Select (Note: To keep the tree of manageable size, it omits some members.) family tree of the Vicini family

Angelo Maria Vicini | Anna Canepa
Mercedes Laura Perdomo Santamaría | Juan Bautista Vicini; 1847–1900 | María Burgos Brito; 1853–? | Giuseppe Vicini | Maria Trabucco
José María Cabral y Báez; 1864–1937 | María Petronila Bermúdez Rochette; 1872–1942 | Juan Bautista Vicini Burgos; 1871–1935 | Isabel Beatriz Burgos Vicini; 1874–1964 | Armando Alberto Mieses Ramírez | Angiolino Vicini | Dilia Ariza Lapuente
Amelia María Cabral Bermúdez; 1899–1996 | Felipe Augusto Vicini Perdomo; 1883–1936 | Juan Bautista Vicini Perdomo; 1881–1949 | Consuelo Amelia de Marchena Damirón; 1885–1975 | Héctor Atilano Vicini Perdomo | María Mercedes Rogers de Moya | Franklin Mieses Burgos; 1907–1976
Amadeo Barletta; 1894–1975 | Nelia Ricart Castillo | Hugo Maximiliano Guiliani Cury b. 1940 | Milady Dolores Coronado Henríquez; 1942–2015
Amadeo Barletta Ricart | Laura Amelia Vicini Cabral | Alma Stella Lluberes Henríquez; 1936–1992 | Juan Bautista Vicini Cabral; 1924–2015 | Felipe de Jesús Vicini Cabral; 1936–1997 | María Elena Pérez Branger b. 1946 | José María Vicini Cabral; 1926–2007
Felipe Augusto Vicini Lluberes b. 1960 | Eliza Margarita Bonetti Galván | Amelia Stella Vicini Lluberes b. 1974 | Carlos Ros | Juan Bautista Vicini Lluberes b. 1975 | Laura Guiliani Coronado | José Leopoldo Vicini Pérez | Eliana Anatole | Marco Antonio Vicini Pérez
Felipe Ernesto Vicini Bonetti | Juan Enrique Vicini Bonetti | Lisa Alexia Vicini Bonetti | Alma Estela Ros Vicini | Uma Vicini Guiliani | Juan Bautista Vicini Guiliani

Notes:
- Executive Presidents of INICIɅ (formerly "VICINI" and originally "Casa Vicini") are shown with a red border. Other shareholder executives are shown with a green border.

Business positions
| Preceded by Juan Bautista Vicini Perdomo | Executive President of Vicini | Succeeded by Felipe Vicini Lluberes |
