= José León Asensio =

Dominican businessman (1934–2024)

José A. León Asensio
- Born: 21 February 1934; Santiago de los Caballeros, Dominican Republic
- Died: 4 March 2024 (aged 90)
- Known for: Entrepreneurship
- Board member of: Grupo León Jimenes
- Spouse: Petrica Cabral Vega
- Children: María Amalia León Cabral & Lidia León Cabral
- Parent(s): Eduardo León Jimenes (father) & María Asensio Córdoba (mother)
- Relatives: Eduardo León Asensio (brother) Sarah Jorge León (granddaughter); Ricardo Brugal León (nephew); José María Cabral Bermúdez (father-in-law); Manuel Díez Cabral (nephew-in-law); Julio Vega Batlle (uncle-in-law) Donald Reid Cabral (cousin-in-law)
- Awards: Order of Christopher Columbus (1983); Grand Officer of the Order of Merit of Duarte, Sánchez and Mella (1993); Empresario de las Américas (1999)

José Augusto César León Asensio (21 February 1934 – 4 March 2024) was a Dominican businessman. León was the President of Grupo León Jimenes. According to Forbes, León Asensio was among the ten largest fortunes in the Dominican Republic, with a net worth that borders the billion-dollar mark.

== Early life ==
Born in 1934 as the seventh and last child of Eduardo Antonio León Jimenes (Guazumal, Tamboril, Santiago, 1885–1937) and María Asensio Córdoba (1896–1976). His father died when he was just 3 years and 7 months old.

León had a degree in Business Management from Babson College (Wellesley, Mass.).

On 3 August 1958, he married Petrica Cabral Vega (born 1938), daughter of José María Cabral Bermúdez and Amelia Vega Batlle (sister of Julio Vega Batlle and great-granddaughter of Ulises Espaillat).

Ancestors of José León Asensio

16. Juan Abreu Hernández; (uncle of #19)
8. Elías de León
17. María Manuela de León
4. Antonio Gavino de León González (b. 1848, m. 1877, d. 1913)
18. Pedro González
9. Francisca González Abreu
19. Juana Teresa Abreu Durán; (niece of #16)
2. Eduardo Antonio León Jimenes (b. 1885, m. 1916, d. 1937)
10. Juan de Jesús Jiménez
5. María Natividad Jiménez López
22. Andrés López Polanco
11. María de la Cruz López
23. Rosa Almánzar
1. José Augusto César León Asensio (b. 1934, m. 1958)
24. (Spain) Antonio Asensio
12. Ramón Asensio Gaspar (died in or before 1903)
25. (Spain) Vicenta Gaspar
6. Ramón Asensio Ruiz (b. 1863, m. 1894, w. 1905, rm. 1911, d. 1946)
26. Francisco Ruíz Luna
13. Eulalia Ruiz Ramírez (registered as widow in the 1903 Census)
27. Escolástica Ramírez Algarrobo
3. María Asensio Córdoba (b. 1896, m. 1916, d. 1976)
14. (Venezuela) Eugenio Córdoba
7. Rosa Adelaida Córdoba Viscarrondo (b. 1870, m. 1894, d. 1905)
30. (Puerto Rico) Andrés de Salvador Vizcarrondo y Ortíz de Zárate (b. 1804, m. 1842, d. 1897)
15. (Venezuela) Octavia Viscarrondo Rojas
31. (Venezuela) Carmen María Dámasa Rojas y Rojas (b. 1827, m. 1842, d. 1893)

== Business career ==
In the 1960s, the tobacco company founded by his father, began to grow tremendously.

== Death ==
José León Asensio died on 4 March 2024, less than two weeks after his 90th birthday.

Business positions
Preceded by Eduardo León Asensio	President and CEO of Grupo León Jimenes; 1993–2024	
Preceded by James A. Stuart, Jr.	Chairman of Cervecería Nacional Dominicana; 1986–1993	Succeeded by Rafael Guillermo Menicucci Vila
