= Mariela Pérez =

Venezuelan beauty pageant titleholder

- Born: María Elena Pérez Branger; February 14, 1946 (age 79); Caracas, Venezuela
- Height: 1.76 m (5 ft 9 in)
- Beauty pageant titleholder
- Hair color: Brown
- Eye color: Brown

María Elena ‘Mariela’ Pérez Branger (born February 14, 1946) is a Venezuelan beauty pageant titleholder who was crowned Miss Venezuela 1967 and was the official representative of Venezuela to the Miss Universe 1967 pageant held in Miami Beach, Florida, United States, on July 15, 1967, when she won the title of 1st Runner-up. The judges gave preference to American Sylvia Hitchcock.

In December 1970 Mariela Perez married a Dominican businessman Jose María Vicini Cabral. In 1978, their first-son was born José Leopoldo. And five years later he had a brother, Marco Antonio. The family moved to Santo Domingo but Mariela sometimes comes home, where still is the queen of Caracas society.

She was and remains an icon of beauty and style both in Venezuela and abroad. In 2001, Mariela Perez was in the jury of the contest Miss Venezuela 2001.

Select (Note: To keep the tree of manageable size, it omits some members.) family tree of the Vicini family

Angelo Maria Vicini	Anna Canepa
Mercedes Laura Perdomo Santamaría	Juan Bautista Vicini; 1847–1900	María Burgos Brito; 1853–?	Giuseppe Vicini	Maria Trabucco
José María Cabral y Báez; 1864–1937	María Petronila Bermúdez Rochette; 1872–1942	Juan Bautista Vicini Burgos; 1871–1935	Isabel Beatriz Burgos Vicini; 1874–1964	Armando Alberto Mieses Ramírez	Angiolino Vicini	Dilia Ariza Lapuente
Amelia María Cabral Bermúdez; 1899–1996	Felipe Augusto Vicini Perdomo; 1883–1936	Juan Bautista Vicini Perdomo; 1881–1949	Consuelo Amelia de Marchena Damirón; 1885–1975	Héctor Atilano Vicini Perdomo	María Mercedes Rogers de Moya	Franklin Mieses Burgos; 1907–1976
Amadeo Barletta; 1894–1975	Nelia Ricart Castillo	Hugo Maximiliano Guiliani Cury b. 1940	Milady Dolores Coronado Henríquez; 1942–2015
Amadeo Barletta Ricart	Laura Amelia Vicini Cabral	Alma Stella Lluberes Henríquez; 1936–1992	Juan Bautista Vicini Cabral; 1924–2015	Felipe de Jesús Vicini Cabral; 1936–1997	María Elena Pérez Branger b. 1946	José María Vicini Cabral; 1926–2007
Felipe Augusto Vicini Lluberes b. 1960	Eliza Margarita Bonetti Galván	Amelia Stella Vicini Lluberes b. 1974	Carlos Ros	Juan Bautista Vicini Lluberes b. 1975	Laura Guiliani Coronado	José Leopoldo Vicini Pérez	Eliana Anatole	Marco Antonio Vicini Pérez
Felipe Ernesto Vicini Bonetti	Juan Enrique Vicini Bonetti	Lisa Alexia Vicini Bonetti	Alma Estela Ros Vicini	Uma Vicini Guiliani	Juan Bautista Vicini Guiliani

Notes:
- Executive Presidents of INICIɅ (formerly "VICINI" and originally "Casa Vicini") are shown with a red border. Other shareholder executives are shown with a green border.

Preceded by Magaly Castro Egui	Miss Venezuela; 1967	Succeeded by Peggy Kopp
