= Vicini =

Wealthiest family in Dominican Republic

The Vicini family a Dominican family of Italian and Spanish origin, is the wealthiest family in the Dominican Republic and is best known for their vast holdings in the sugar industry. The family business was started by Juan Bautista Vicini Canepa, who migrated to the Dominican Republic from Italy in 1860.

== Juan Bautista Vicini ==
Juan Bautista Vicini Canepa (né Giovanni Battista Vicini), was born on February 25, 1847, in Zoagli, a coastal village near Genoa to Angelo Vicini and Anna Canepa. Vicini left Italy and went to the Dominican Republic in 1860 at the age of 13. He was invited to travel to the Dominican Republic as an apprentice to join his countryman Nicole Genevaro who was an exporter of coffee and sugar. After a few years, he purchased the operations belonging to Mr. Genevaro.

Juan Bautista, better known as "Baciccia", was very successful in business. Thanks in part to his hard work and his savings, he managed to acquire land for the cultivation of sugar cane.

His family residence is located on the Avenida Isabel la Católica No. 158, in the city of Santo Domingo, marked with a placard reading J.B. Vicini. This designation is still preserved on the facades of the building belonging to the family. This residence was his place of work. Locals gave it the name Casa Vicini.

Eleven children were born of his marriage to Mercedes Laura Perdomo Santamaría. Seven of them went to live with her to Genoa, Italy. While being married, he had an affair with María Burgos Brito and begat 3 children, among them, President Juan Bautista Vicini Burgos.

Vicini Canepa, patriarch of the Vicini family, returned only once to Italy and died in 1900 at the age of 53.

== Felipe and Juan Vicini Perdomo ==
Upon his death, Juan and Felipe Vicini Perdomo, suspended their professional studies in Italy to take over the family business in the Dominican Republic.

Felipe and Juan Vicini Perdomo increased investment to modernize the factory and field work in the sugar, in real estate both in urban and rural areas of the country.

The political and economic pressure of the Dominican dictator Rafael Leonidas Trujillo by appropriating all the national wealth, forced the family Vicini Cabral to transfer their residence abroad.

== Third generation ==
The third generation of the Vicinis was constituted by José María, Juan Bautista (Gianni), Felipe and Laura Vicini Cabral, under the leadership of Gianni; this generation participated actively in the process of overthrowing the dictatorship, the country's economic consolidation and democratic process of the nation.

The beginning of democracy with the death of Dominican dictator Trujillo in 1961, he found a country where almost all economic areas had been dominated by the dictator and his closest relatives and collaborators.

The active participation as well as the capital of the Vicini family was instrumental in creating private banks, universities, associations, businesses and nonprofit foundations, all promoters of the country's development and new business that channeled the nation towards development. The family Vicini Cabral participated in those efforts, both as advocates, with financial resources and with the participation and personal presence.

Laura and Felipe Vicini Cabral died childless.

== Fourth generation ==
The 4th generation of the Vicini entrepreneurial dynasty is comprised by the siblings Amelia Stella, Felipe, and Juan Bautista Vicini Lluberes and their first cousins José Leopoldo and Marco Vicini Pérez.

== Family tree ==
Select (Note: To keep the tree of manageable size, it omits some members.) family tree of the Vicini family

Angelo Maria Vicini | Anna Canepa
Mercedes Laura Perdomo Santamaría | Juan Bautista Vicini; 1847–1900 | María Burgos Brito; 1853–? | Giuseppe Vicini | Maria Trabucco
José María Cabral y Báez; 1864–1937 | María Petronila Bermúdez Rochette; 1872–1942 | Juan Bautista Vicini Burgos; 1871–1935 | Isabel Beatriz Burgos Vicini; 1874–1964 | Armando Alberto Mieses Ramírez | Angiolino Vicini | Dilia Ariza Lapuente
Amelia María Cabral Bermúdez; 1899–1996 | Felipe Augusto Vicini Perdomo; 1883–1936 | Juan Bautista Vicini Perdomo; 1881–1949 | Consuelo Amelia de Marchena Damirón; 1885–1975 | Héctor Atilano Vicini Perdomo | María Mercedes Rogers de Moya | Franklin Mieses Burgos; 1907–1976
Amadeo Barletta; 1894–1975 | Nelia Ricart Castillo | Hugo Maximiliano Guiliani Cury b. 1940 | Milady Dolores Coronado Henríquez; 1942–2015
Amadeo Barletta Ricart | Laura Amelia Vicini Cabral | Alma Stella Lluberes Henríquez; 1936–1992 | Juan Bautista Vicini Cabral; 1924–2015 | Felipe de Jesús Vicini Cabral; 1936–1997 | María Elena Pérez Branger b. 1946 | José María Vicini Cabral; 1926–2007
Felipe Augusto Vicini Lluberes b. 1960 | Eliza Margarita Bonetti Galván | Amelia Stella Vicini Lluberes b. 1974 | Carlos Ros | Juan Bautista Vicini Lluberes b. 1975 | Laura Guiliani Coronado | José Leopoldo Vicini Pérez | Eliana Anatole | Marco Antonio Vicini Pérez
Felipe Ernesto Vicini Bonetti | Juan Enrique Vicini Bonetti | Lisa Alexia Vicini Bonetti | Alma Estela Ros Vicini | Uma Vicini Guiliani | Juan Bautista Vicini Guiliani

Notes:
- Executive Presidents of INICIɅ (formerly "VICINI" and originally "Casa Vicini") are shown with a red border. Other shareholder executives are shown with a green border.

== See also ==
- Juan Bautista Vicini Burgos

== Sources ==
- Ferran, Fernando. The legacy of Jose Maria Vicini Cabral, Santo Domingo, Dominican Republic, 2007.
