= Juan Bautista Vicini Burgos =

Dominican political figure

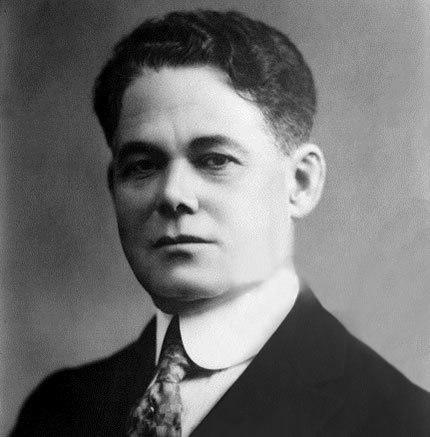
Juan Bautista Vicini Burgos

Juan Bautista Vicini Burgos (19 July 1871 – 25 May 1935) was a Dominican political figure. He served as provisional president of the Dominican Republic between 1922 and 1924 during the U.S. military occupation.

== Early life ==
Juan Bautista Vicini was born on 19 July 1871 to Italian immigrant Juan Bautista Vicini Cánepa (born Giovanni Battista Vicini) and María Burgos Brito. His father arrived to the Dominican Republic during the boom in the sugar industry which he took advantage of to create a respectable operation within a relatively short amount of time. According to the Dutch author H. Hoetink in his book El Pueblo Dominicano, 1850–1900, his father owned two sugar plantations by 1882 and by 1893 was the owner of the sugar mill "Angelina". His friendly relationship with Dictator Ulises Heureaux helped him consolidate a significant fortune. Vicini inherited his father's business and was able to become a successful businessman mainly by part of his strict European education. Vicini was fluent in Spanish, Italian, English and French at a very young age.

Juan Bautista Vicini never married and had no wife during his presidency.

Select (Note: To keep the tree of manageable size, it omits some members.) family tree of the Vicini family

Angelo Maria Vicini	Anna Canepa
Mercedes Laura Perdomo Santamaría	Juan Bautista Vicini; 1847–1900	María Burgos Brito; 1853–?	Giuseppe Vicini	Maria Trabucco
José María Cabral y Báez; 1864–1937	María Petronila Bermúdez Rochette; 1872–1942	Juan Bautista Vicini Burgos; 1871–1935	Isabel Beatriz Burgos Vicini; 1874–1964	Armando Alberto Mieses Ramírez	Angiolino Vicini	Dilia Ariza Lapuente
Amelia María Cabral Bermúdez; 1899–1996	Felipe Augusto Vicini Perdomo; 1883–1936	Juan Bautista Vicini Perdomo; 1881–1949	Consuelo Amelia de Marchena Damirón; 1885–1975	Héctor Atilano Vicini Perdomo	María Mercedes Rogers de Moya	Franklin Mieses Burgos; 1907–1976
Amadeo Barletta; 1894–1975	Nelia Ricart Castillo	Hugo Maximiliano Guiliani Cury b. 1940	Milady Dolores Coronado Henríquez; 1942–2015
Amadeo Barletta Ricart	Laura Amelia Vicini Cabral	Alma Stella Lluberes Henríquez; 1936–1992	Juan Bautista Vicini Cabral; 1924–2015	Felipe de Jesús Vicini Cabral; 1936–1997	María Elena Pérez Branger b. 1946	José María Vicini Cabral; 1926–2007
Felipe Augusto Vicini Lluberes b. 1960	Eliza Margarita Bonetti Galván	Amelia Stella Vicini Lluberes b. 1974	Carlos Ros	Juan Bautista Vicini Lluberes b. 1975	Laura Guiliani Coronado	José Leopoldo Vicini Pérez	Eliana Anatole	Marco Antonio Vicini Pérez
Felipe Ernesto Vicini Bonetti	Juan Enrique Vicini Bonetti	Lisa Alexia Vicini Bonetti	Alma Estela Ros Vicini	Uma Vicini Guiliani	Juan Bautista Vicini Guiliani

Notes:
- Executive Presidents of INICIɅ (formerly "VICINI" and originally "Casa Vicini") are shown with a red border. Other shareholder executives are shown with a green border.

== Political career ==
The Dominican Republic had been occupied by American Troops since 1916 and after the approval of the Hughes-Peynado plan Vicini was a candidate for the position of provisional President of the Dominican Republic. He was elected President in 1922 and his main goal was to facilitate the evacuation of the United States troops that were present in the Dominican Republic. The day after he was elected, Vicini named the five men who would make up his cabinet. They were as follows:

1. José del Carmen Ariza, Secretary of Internal Affairs
2. Cayetano Armando Rodríquez, Secretary of Justice and Instruction
3. Eladio Sánchez, Secretary of Promotion and Communications
4. Manuel Sanabia, Secretary of Health and Charity
5. Pedro Pérez, Secretary of Agriculture and Immigration

With these steps, Vicini assured the removal of the North American forces in a peaceful manner. Despite its good intentions, Vicini's regime was plagued and pressured by the tight grip of the Hughes-Peynado plan and by the American forces that were still in the country. Even so, he set up the cleanest elections that the Dominican Republic had ever seen in which Horacio Vásquez won on 15 March 1924 against Francisco J. Peynado.

When Vicini left the presidency after the elections, he went back to his sugar business and abandoned politics for the remainder of his life. At the time of his death on 25 May 1935 Juan Bautista Vicini left his relatives one of the largest sugar enterprises in the Caribbean, which is still operating as of 2010.
