= José Francisco Peña Gómez =

Dominican politician (1937–1998)

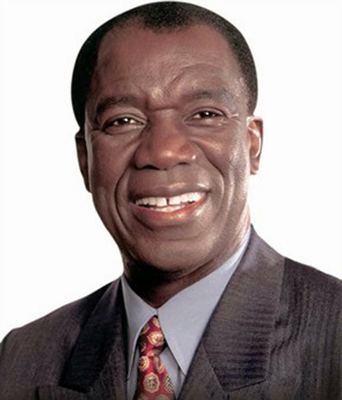
- Born: 6 March 1937; Esperanza, Dominican Republic
- Died: 10 May 1998 (aged 61); Cambita Garabitos, Dominican Republic
- Burial place: Cementerio Cristo Redentor, Santo Domingo, Dominican Republic
- Political party: Dominican Revolutionary Party
- Other political affiliations: Social Democratic Institutional Bloc

Mayor of Santo Domingo (National District)
- In office 16 August 1982 – 16 August 1986
- Preceded by: Pedro Franco Badía
- Succeeded by: Fello Suberví

José Francisco Peña Gómez (6 March 1937 – 10 May 1998) was a politician from the Dominican Republic. He was the leader of the Dominican Revolutionary Party (PRD), a three-time candidate for president of the Dominican Republic and former Mayor of Santo Domingo. He is considered, along with Joaquín Balaguer and Juan Bosch, as one of the most prominent Dominican political figures of the 20th century.

== Early life ==
Born to María Marcelin, a Haitian woman, and Oguís Vincent, a Haitian immigrant, on March 6, 1937, in Mao, Dominican Republic, Peña Gómez was adopted as an infant by Simón Pichardo and Andrea Rodríguez de Pichardo, a Dominican family, when his parents had to flee to Haiti (where they died) in order to save their lives as the Dominican dictator Rafael Trujillo enacted the Parsley Massacre against Haitians that same year. In later years, Peña Gómez’ opponents would use his Haitian ancestry against him.

Peña Gómez received a BA-equivalent degree from the Autonomous University of Santo Domingo (UASD) in 1966 before going on to higher studies at the Sorbonne in Paris.

== The April Civil War and exile ==
Since 1961, Peña Gómez became a supporter of Juan Bosch, then leader of the Dominican Revolutionary Party (PRD). Bosch won the presidential elections of 1962, the first democratic president in 32 years, but his government was ousted in a military coup on 25 September 1963. In 1965, Peña rose to political prominence as he went on Radio Santo Domingo and called for a popular insurrection against the military coup and a return of Bosch. U.S. President Lyndon Johnson ordered a military invasion to prevent what he feared was a possible communist movement within the country.

== Leadership of the P.R.D. ==
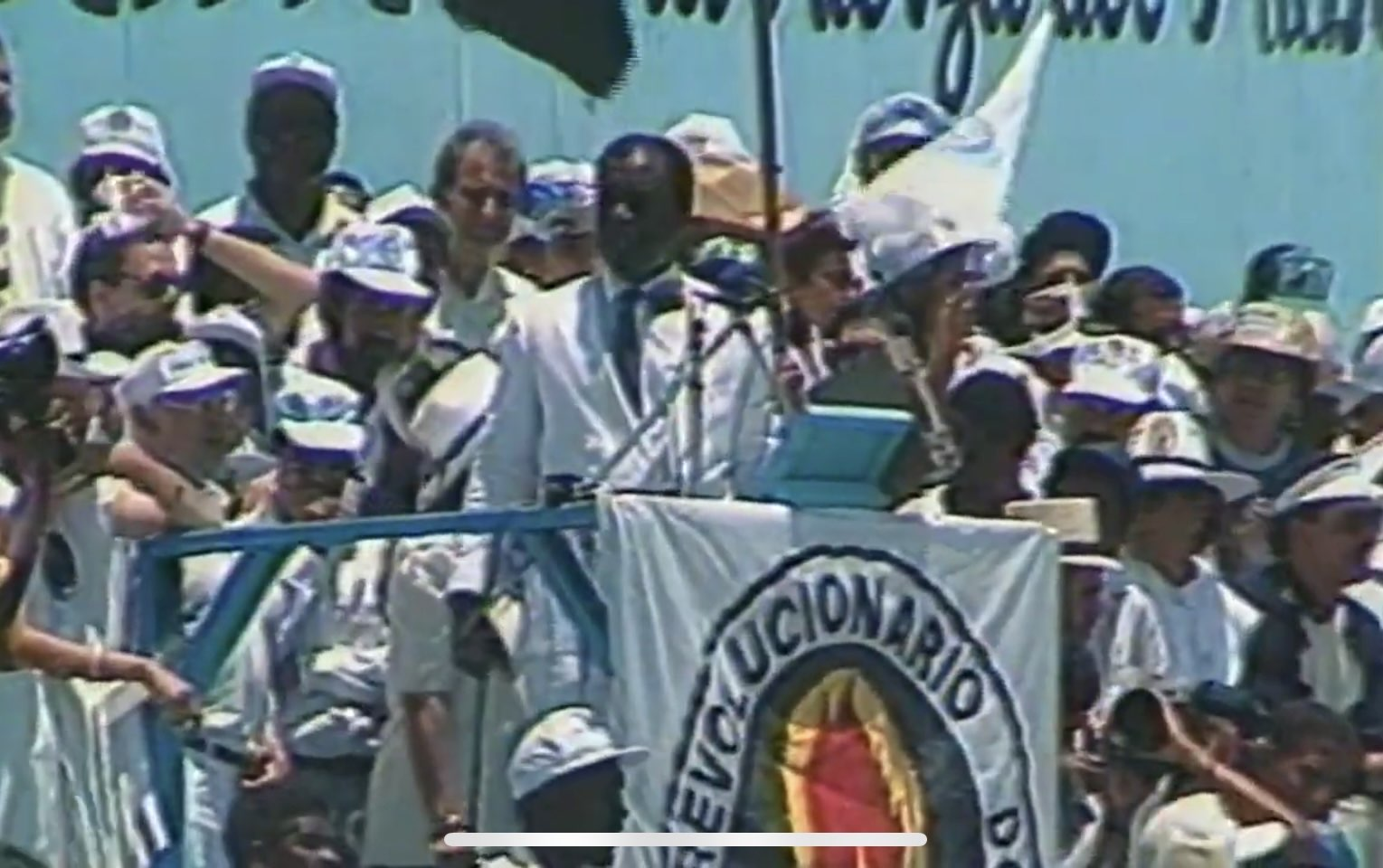
Peña Gómez at a rally

In December 1973, Bosch formed the Dominican Liberation Party (P.L.D.). Under Peña's leadership, the P.R.D. won the presidential election in 1978 (Antonio Guzmán) and 1982 (Salvador Jorge Blanco), and he himself was Mayor of Santo Domingo from 1982 to 1986. His period is mostly remembered for the creation of the Plaza Güibia (Güibia Plaza), on the seaside boulevard and plantation of ornamental trees in mayor Santo Domingo city avenues. In 1990, Peña ran for the presidency, coming in third behind Balaguer of the Social Christian Reformist Party (PRSC) and Bosch of the PLD.

By 1994, the PRD was solidified and motivated, and Peña was once again the party's standard-bearer in the presidential election. Even by Dominican standards, the 1994 campaign was violent and dirty. Peña lost to Balaguer in an extremely tight election marred by numerous irregularities. A number of Peña supporters showed up to vote only to discover their names had vanished from the rolls. Peña called a general strike which was widely supported by his followers. After international protest, an investigation was mounted that raised grave concerns about the poll's legitimacy. The electoral board did not know the total number of registered voters, and the voting lists distributed

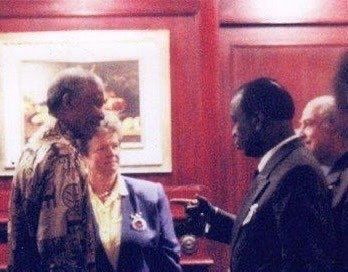
Socialist International Vice President Peña Gómez and Nelson Mandela

at polling stations did not match those given to the parties. The investigation also revealed that about 200,000 people had been removed from the polls. After intense negotiations, Balaguer announced that he would leave office prematurely in 1996 after serving seven terms in power.

In the 1996 poll, Peña won the first round of voting but fell short of the majority needed. In the second round of voting, Leonel Fernández, a lawyer representing the PLD, won a narrow victory due to an alliance between the PLD with Balaguer's PRSC.

== Vice-President of Socialist International ==
As Vice President of the Socialist International, José Francisco Peña Gómez worked closely with the organization's leadership, including its President, Willy Brandt. His tenure was marked by active participation in key initiatives and strategic discussions aimed at strengthening the social-democratic movement in Latin America and worldwide.

Peña Gómez collaborated with prominent political figures such as Bruno Kreisky, François Mitterrand, Olof Palme, Mário Soares, and Felipe González.

Throughout his work, he also engaged with distinguished leaders, including Bettino Craxi (Italy), Anker Jørgensen (Denmark), Lionel Jospin (France), Kalevi Sorsa (Finland), Joop den Uyl (Netherlands), as well as Léopold Senghor (Senegal) and Boutros Boutros-Ghali (Egypt).

For 15 years, Peña Gómez chaired the Socialist International Committee for Latin America, playing a key role in shaping its agenda and supporting democratic transformations in the region.

== Personal life ==
Peña Gómez married four times, the first time with Julia Idalia Guaba Martínez. The children are as follows: Lourdes Fátima, Luz del Alba “Luchy”, José Francisco “José Frank”, and Francisco Antonio “Tony” Peña Guaba.

During his second marriage with Ana Rosa Meléndez (who was Director of the Museum of Modern Dominican Art), they adopted María Rosa, the daughter of a domestic worker, who at birth had been abandoned in the public maternity hospital in Santo Domingo.

His fourth and last marriage was to Peggy Cabral, daughter of the Dominican writer Manuel del Cabral. Peña had nine children in total.

== Final years ==
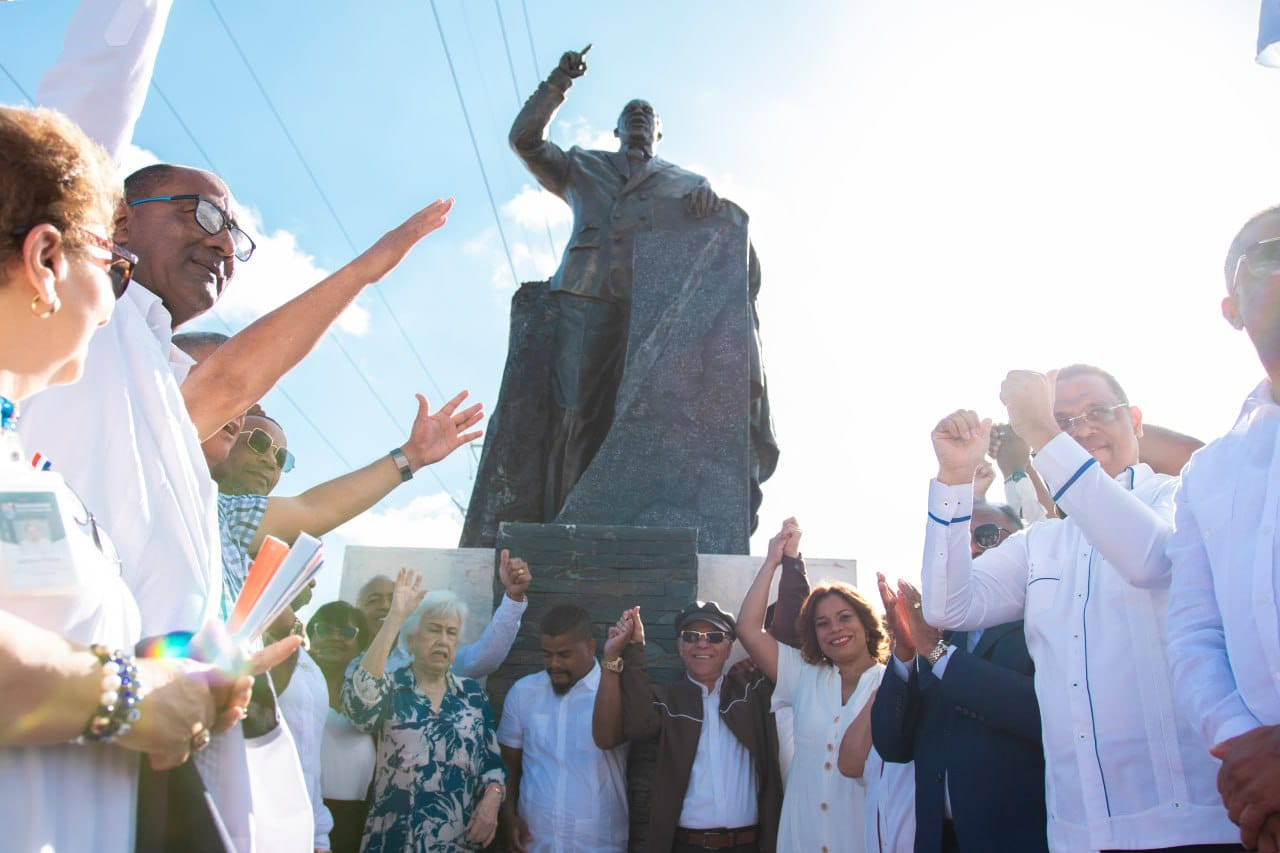
Monument in honor of Peña Gómez in Santo Domingo

Peña Gómez died on May 10, 1998, in Cambita Garabitos, San Cristóbal, from a pulmonary edema caused by a long history of pancreatic and stomach cancer. He died six days before the mayoral elections of Santo Domingo, in which he was running.

Peña Gómez was one of the most popular leaders in recent political history in Dominican Republic, especially among the poor masses.

Being a key political figure until his death, the main Dominican Republic international airport was renamed from "Aeropuerto Internacional Las Américas" to "Aeropuerto Internacional Las Américas José Francisco Peña Gómez".

== Legacy ==
In honor of José Francisco Peña Gómez, a monument stands proudly in the capital city of Santo Domingo, symbolizing his enduring legacy and profound impact on the Dominican Republic and beyond.

A metro station and an International Airport in Santo Domingo is named in honor of Peña Gómez.

A street in Higüey is named in honor of Peña Gómez.

Сommemorative bust has been erected in Puerto Rico, supported by the Dominican community.

== José Francisco Peña Gómez Institute ==
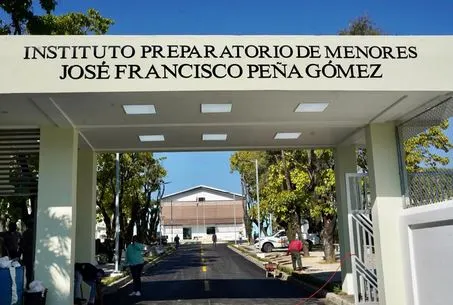
Peña Gómez Institute in Santo Domingo

The José Francisco Peña Gómez Institute is an educational and research center dedicated to preserving and promoting the legacy of José Francisco Peña Gómez. The institute focuses on advancing the principles of democracy, social justice, and human rights through educational programs, leadership training, and policy research.

The institute serves as a hub for academic dialogue and civic engagement, offering workshops, seminars, and conferences on topics such as good governance, social inclusion, and sustainable development. It plays a key role in empowering young leaders, providing them with tools and knowledge to actively participate in political and social processes.

== See also ==
- List of political parties in the Dominican Republic
- Politics of the Dominican Republic

Government offices
| Preceded by Pedro Franco Badía | Mayor of Santo Domingo, Distrito Nacional; 1982–1986 | Succeeded by Fello Suberví |
