= Asian Dominican =

Asian Dominican may refer to:

- Ethnic Chinese in the Dominican Republic
- Japanese settlement in the Dominican Republic
