= Cristian Rodríguez (disambiguation) =

Cristian Rodríguez (born 1985) is a Uruguayan footballer.

Cristian Rodríguez may also refer to:

- Cristian Rodríguez (boxer) (born 1973), Argentine boxer
- Cristian Rodríguez (tennis) (born 1990), Colombian tennis player
- Cristián Rodríguez (cyclist) (born 1995), Spanish cyclist
- Cristian Rodríguez (footballer, born 1996), Spanish footballer
- Cristián Rodríguez (baseball) (born 2002), Cuban baseball infielder

== See also ==
- Christian Rodriguez (born 1995), Salvadoran footballer
- Cristina Rodríguez (disambiguation)
