= Frank Moya Pons =

Dominican historian

Dr. Rafael Francisco “Frank” Moya Pons is one of the leading contemporary historians of the Dominican Republic. He has published many important books on the history and cultural heritage of the country. One of his best-known works is Manual de historia dominicana (1992), a foundational work of Dominican historiography now in its tenth edition. In 1985 he authored the book Between Slavery and Free Labor: The Spanish, in 1998 The Dominican Republic: A National History, and in 2007 History of the Caribbean: plantations, trade, and war in the Atlantic world. He has also conducted much research on slavery in the Dominican Republic and Caribbean.

Moya has a Degree in Philosophy at the Autonomous University of Santo Domingo (UASD), and a Masters in both Latin American History and European History at Georgetown University. Moya has a Ph.D. in Latin American History, Economic Development and Quantitative Methods from Columbia University.

Moya Pons has taught history at the Pontifical Catholic University Mother and Teacher in the Dominican Republic, at Columbia University and the University of Florida in the US, and has been a research professor at City College of New York.

Moya was President of the Dominican Academy of History. In 2013, he published Bibliografía de la Historia Dominicana 1730-2010.

Academic offices
Preceded by Emilio Cordero Michel	Chairman of the Dominican Academy of History; 2010–2013	Succeeded by Bernardo Vega
