= Cristina Rodrigues =

Cristina Rodrigues may refer to:

- Cristina Rodrigues (politician) (born 1985), Portuguese politician

== See also ==
- Cristina Rodríguez (disambiguation)
