= Pedro Franco Badía =

Dominican politician

Pedro Franco Badía (Noná, San Francisco de Macorís, 25 May 1935 – Santo Domingo, 4 December 2016) was a Dominican politician who served as Mayor of Santo Domingo, Distrito Nacional (1978–1982), Secretary of Labor (1982–1986), Deputy to the Congress (1990–1994, 1998–2002), Administrative Secretary of the Presidency (2002–2003) and Secretary of Interior and Police of the Dominican Republic (2003–2004). He was also a key member of the Proyecto Presidencial Hipólito political movement, a political faction that took over the Dominican Revolutionary Party (a major Dominican political party).

He was prosecuted by the Dominican District Attorney's office for his involvement in the illegal distribution of public transportation vehicles in the Dominican Republic through a dubious government program known as Plan RENOVE. He was amongst several members from the former Hipólito Mejía administration who had been brought to court for the crime of embezzlement to the tune of $1.8 billion Dominican pesos (some $54 million American dollars in current exchange) while he was in charge of the Plan RENOVE.

On 17 October 2005, Badía was found guilty and sentenced by a criminal court to three years under house arrest and a minuscule RD$15 million fine for his willful participation in the illegal distribution of 3,035 vehicles in violation of Articles 166, 168 and 170 of the Dominican Penal Code and Article 102 of the Constitution of the Dominican Republic. His sentence was confirmed by the Santo Domingo court on 15 September 2006.

Badía died at the Centers for Diagnostics and Advanced Medicine and Medical Conferences and Telemedicine (CEDIMAT) hospital on 4 December 2016.

Government offices
Preceded by Juan Rafael Estrella Rojas	Mayor of Santo Domingo, Distrito Nacional; 1978–1982	Succeeded by José Francisco Peña Gómez
