= List of presidents of the Senate of the Dominican Republic =

List of presidents of the Senate of the Dominican Republic. The president is elected for a one-year term, and can be re-elected.

Dominican Republic has had upper chamber (bicameral legislature) 1844–1854, 1858–1861, 1865–1866, 1878–1880, and since 1908.

Below is a complete list of office-holders from 1908:

Name	Took office/left office	Notes
Benigno F. de Rojas	1854	
Tomás Bobadilla	1854	
Pedro Francisco Bonó	1858	
Valentín Ramírez Báez	1866	
Jacinto de la Concha	1866	
Ricardo Curiel	1866	
Francisco Billini	1878–1879	
Mariano A. Cestero	1879	
Leovigildo Cuello	1908	
Francisco Leonte Vásquez	1908–1909	
Leovigildo Cuello	1910	
Ramón O. Lovatón	1911–1913	
Leovigildo Cuello	1913–1914	
Mario Fermín Cabral y Báez	1914–1916	
Gustavo A. Díaz	1924–1930	
Mario Fermín Cabral y Báez	1930–1938	
Porfirio Herrera	1938–1942	
Manuel de Jesús Troncoso de la Concha	1943–1955	
Mario Fermín Cabral y Báez	1955	
Porfirio Herrera	1955–1962	
Juan Casasnova Garrido	1963	
Rodolfo Valdez Santana	1966–1967	
Miguel Ángel Luna Morales	1967–1968	
Adriano A. Uribe Silva	1968–1978	
Juan Rafael Peralta Pérez	1978–1981	
Elvio A. Rodríguez	1981–1982	
Jacobo Majluta	1982–1983	
Noel Suverbi Espinosa	1983–1985	
Jacobo Majluta	1985–1986	
Florentino Carvajal Suero	1986–1987	
Francisco Ortego Canela	1987–1990	
Florentino Carvajal Suero	1990–1991	
José Osvaldo Leger Aquino	1991–1992	
Augusto Feliz Matos	1992–1993	
José Osvaldo Leger Aquino	1993–1994	
Amable Aristy Castro	1994–1998	
Ramón Alburquerque Ramírez	1998–2000	
Andrés Bautista García	2001–2003	
Jesús Vasquéz Martínez	2003–2004	
Andrés Bautista García	2004–2006	
Reinaldo Pared Pérez	2006–2014	
Cristina Lizardo	2014–2016	
Reinaldo Pared Pérez	2016–2020	
Eduardo Estrella	2020–2023	
Ricardo de los Santos Polanco	2023–	
