= Mu-Kien Adriana Sang =

Dr. Mu-Kien Adriana Sang

Chairperson of the Dominican Academy of History
- In office 13 July 2016 – 14 August 2019
- Deputy: Adriano Miguel Tejada
- Preceded by: Bernardo Vega
- Succeeded by: José Chez Checo

Vice-chairperson of the Dominican Academy of History
- In office 1 August 2013 – 13 July 2016
- Preceded by: Bernardo Vega
- Succeeded by: Adriano Miguel Tejada
- Writing career
- Born: September 8, 1955 (age 70); Santiago de los Caballeros, Dominican Republic
- Occupations: Historian, essayist, analyst, politologist and academic
- Spouse: Rafael Toribio
- Relatives: Miguel Sang, Ana Ben(parents)
- Language: Spanish
- Genres: History, Biography
- Notable works: "Ulises Heureaux: Biografía de un Dictador"; "Buenaventura Báez: El Caudillo del Sur (1844-1878)"; "Una Utopía Inconclusa: Espaillat y el Liberalismo Dominicano del Siglo XIX"; "Historia Dominicana: Ayer y Hoy"
- Notable awards: Premio Nacional de Didáctica (2000); Premio Nacional de Historia (2001)
- Website: linkedin.com/pub/mu-kien-adriana-sang-ben-de-toribio/4a/700/1a

Mu-Kien Adriana Sang Ben (born 8 September 1955) is a historian, essayist, analyst, political scientist and academic from the Dominican Republic. Sang is Vice-Rector of the Madre y Maestra Pontifical Catholic University.

The daughter of a Cantonese immigrant man, and a Dominican-born woman whose father was a Chinese immigrant and her mother was Mulata. Sang has a degree in Teaching Summa Cum Laude in the Pontificia Universidad Católica Madre y Maestra, where she has taught for more than two decades. She did her graduate degree in Adult Education in the Centro de Cooperación Regional para la Educación de Adultos de América Latina y el Caribe (CREFAL) in 1978, in Mexico City. In 1985 she achieved his PhD in History and Civilization at the School for Advanced Studies in the Social Sciences in Paris. She translated from French to Spanish the work Correspondence of the Consul of France in Santo Domingo, published in two volumes under the sponsorship of the official Sesquicentennial Commission of National Independence. She has been a guest professor and public speaker at several universities in different nations.

In 2006, a street was named in her honor at the Plaza of Culture Juan Pablo Duarte, host of the International Book Fair of Santo Domingo.

Her husband, Rafael Toribio, has been rector of the Santo Domingo Institute of Technology (INTEC).

== Notes and references ==
Academic offices
Preceded by Bernardo Vega	Chairperson of the Dominican Academy of History; 2016–2019	Succeeded by José Chez Checo
