= Cristalia Premium Water =

Producer of bottled drinking water in Puerto Rico

Coordinates: 18°2′1.97″N 66°32′55.93″W

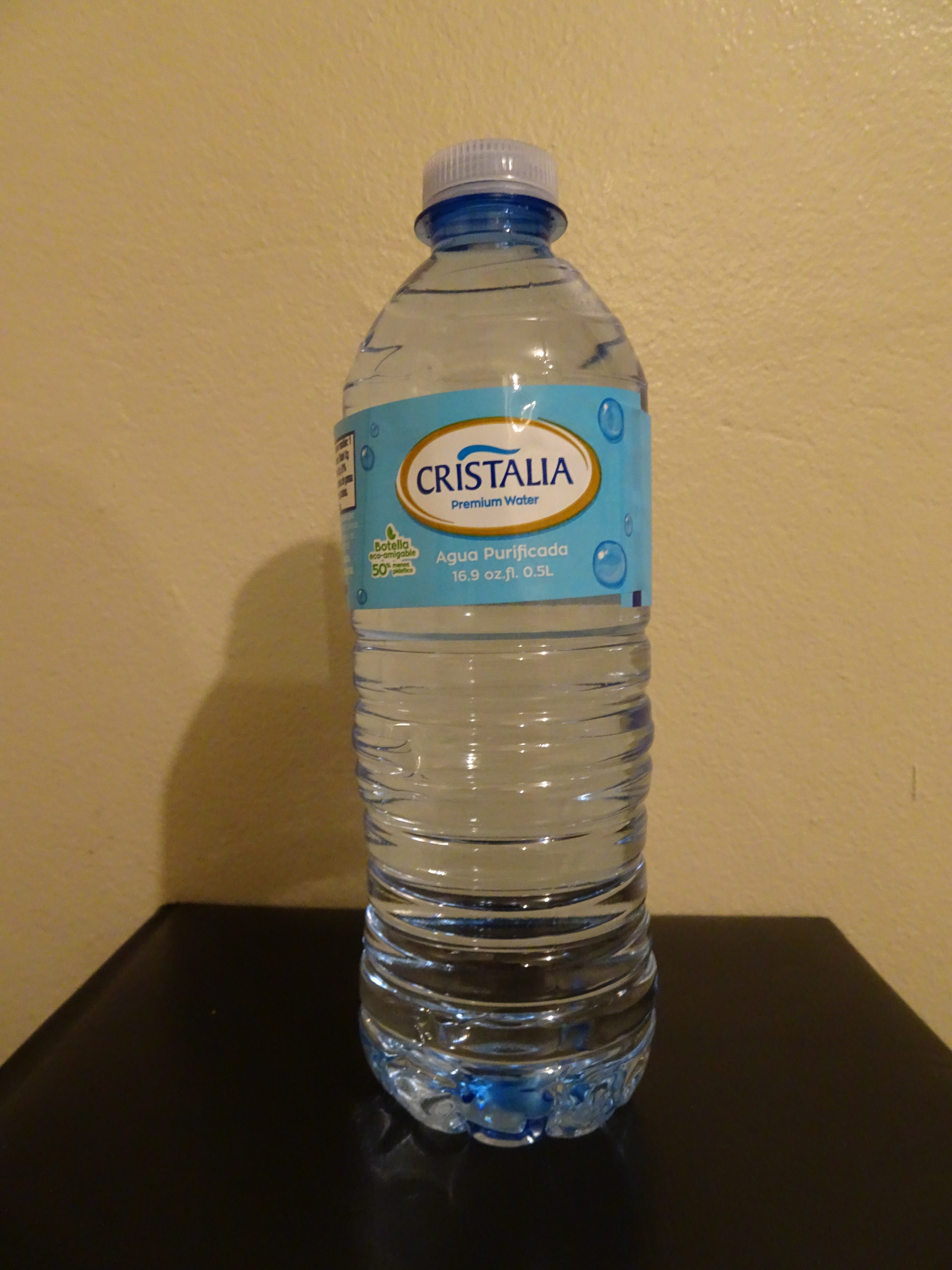
- Company type: Private
- Industry: Food/Beverages
- Founded: 1986; 40 years ago
- Founder: Salvador Vassallo
- Headquarters: Blvd Julian de Rodriguez, Coto Laurel, Ponce, Puerto Rico
- Area served: Puerto Rico and the United States
- Key people: Manuel Díez Cabral, Chairman & CEO
- Products: Bottled water
- Services: 787-813-1281, and 787-848-2305
- Revenue: 103,00,000
- Operating income: $100 Million USD
- Number of employees: 200 (2019)
- Website: http://cristaliapremiumwater.com

Cristalia Premium Water is a producer of bottled drinking water in Puerto Rico. The company is headquartered in Barrio Coto Laurel, Ponce, Puerto Rico. It is Puerto Rico's largest manufacturer and supplier of bottled water. In 2006, the Company was recognized by Beverage World Magazine as "the premier bottled water in Puerto Rico." In 2018, Honeywell International recognized it as "the Caribbean’s leading bottled water company".

== History ==
Salvador “Chiri” Vasallo, a plastics industrialist, founded the company in 1986 in his Ponce, Puerto Rico, farm, where the bottling plant was still located as of 2016. In 1989, Vassallo sold his bottled water operation to Pepsi Cola Puerto Rico Bottling Co., the local Pepsi bottler in the island. In 1998, the local Pepsi Puerto Rico bottler was sold to the larger PepsiAmericas bottling corporation. At the time, Pepsi was preparing to introduce its own bottled water brand, Aquafina, to the market, so it put the Cristalia division up for sale. David Virginia and a group of investors acquired Cristalia Premium Water from Pepsi Americas.

== Growth ==
The company started in Ponce, then expanded in 2009 to Carolina, Puerto Rico, then (in 2019) moved the Carolina location to a 45-cuerdas facility in Las Piedras, Puerto Rico. The company delivers to every chain store in Puerto Rico, including the likes of Walmart and Home Depot.

== Facilities ==
The company's location in Ponce consist of a 20,000ft² facility. The Carolina, Puerto Rico, facility consists of a 160,000-square-foot covered floor manufacturing area.

== See also ==
- Salvador Vassallo
- Ponce, Puerto Rico
