= Miss Venezuela 1967 =

14th edition of the Miss Venezuela competition

- Date: June 15, 1967
- Venue: Teatro de la Academia Militar, Caracas, Venezuela
- Broadcaster: RCTV
- Entrants: 16
- Placements: 5
- Winner: Mariela Pérez; Vargas

Miss Venezuela 1967 was the 14th edition of Miss Venezuela pageant held at Teatro de la Academia Militar in Caracas, Venezuela, on June 15, 1967, after weeks of events. The winner of the pageant was Mariela Pérez Branger, Miss Departamento Vargas.

The pageant was broadcast live by RCTV.

== Results ==
=== Placements ===
- Miss Venezuela 1967 - Mariela Pérez Branger (Miss Departamento Vargas)
- 1st runner-up - Irene Bottger (Miss Bolívar)
- 2nd runner-up - Ingrid Goecke (Miss Zulia)
- 3rd runner-up - Eunice De Lima (Miss Apure)
- 4th runner-up - Minerva Salas (Miss Anzoátegui)

=== Special awards ===
- Miss Cordialidad (Miss Cordiality) - Clara Morales (Miss Distrito Federal)
- Miss Sonrisa (Best Smile) - Bertha Piña (Miss Lara)

== Contestants ==
- Miss Anzoátegui - Minerva Salas Aguinagalde
- Miss Apure - Eunice De Lima Molina
- Miss Aragua - Maria Elena Maldonado
- Miss Bolívar - Irene Bottger González
- Miss Carabobo - Raquel D'Vivo
- Miss Caracas - Bárbara Kowalsky
- Miss Departamento Vargas - Mariela Pérez Branger
- Miss Distrito Federal - Clara Morales Curiel
- Miss Lara - Bertha Piña Montes
- Miss Mérida - Lala Lydia Tyjouck
- Miss Miranda - Johanna Lozada Bermúdez
- Miss Monagas - Mayela Livinalli Matamoros
- Miss Nueva Esparta - Janeth Adams Rosales
- Miss Sucre - Dorkys Yánez Arévalo
- Miss Yaracuy - Ivonne Sosa Vásquez
- Miss Zulia - Ingrid Goecke Briceño
