= Reid & Compania =

Reid & Compania is composed of several companies engaged in the distribution of brands in the automotive and heavy equipment industries in the Dominican Republic such as Jeep, Chrysler, Dodge, RAM, Maserati, Komatsu, Wanco, among others.

== History ==
Reid & Compañía, S.A., established in 1947 as Reid & Pellerano, C. por A., is the parent company of Grupo ReidCo and was founded by Donald J. Reid Cabral and Rogelio A. Pellerano Romano. Today, Grupo ReidCo remains in the hands of the Reid family.

== Subsidiaries ==
The main companies of Grupo ReidCo are:

- Reid & Compañía - Exclusive distributor and service of automotive brands Jeep, Chrysler, Dodge, RAM and Maserati in Dominican Republic. Also Heavy Equipment manufacturers Komatsu.
- Autocamiones - Exclusive distributor of automotive brand Isuzu in Dominican Republic.
- Agencias Generales
- ReidCo Corporación de Crédito

== Brands ==
The brands represented by Grupo ReidCo include:

- Chrysler
- Jeep
- Dodge
- RAM
- SRT
- Mopar
- Maserati
- GEM
- Daihatsu
- Isuzu
- Komatsu
- Komatsu Forklift
- Dynapac
- KMP Brand / Diesel Guard Brand
- Total Lubricants
- Bridgestone - Firestone
- Tennant
- Sakai
- JLG
- Wynn's
- Rhino Linings
- Wanco
