= Manuel Troncoso de la Concha =

President of Dominican Republic from 1940 to 1942

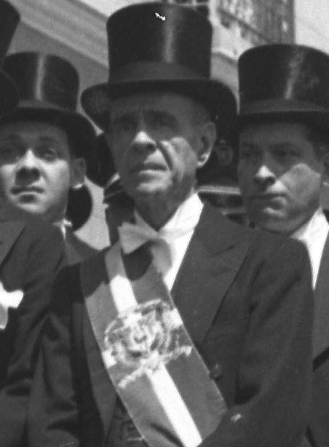
- Troncoso in 1940

38th President of the Dominican Republic
- In office 24 February 1940 – 16 August 1942
- Vice President: Vacant
- Leader: Rafael Trujillo
- Preceded by: Jacinto Peynado
- Succeeded by: Rafael Trujillo

23rd Vice President of the Dominican Republic
- In office 16 August 1938 – 24 February 1940
- President: Jacinto Peynado
- Preceded by: Jacinto Peynado
- Succeeded by: Joaquín Balaguer

President of the Senate
- In office January 1943 – 30 May 1955
- Preceded by: Porfirio Herrera
- Succeeded by: Mario Fermín Cabral y Báez

Personal details
- Born: Manuel de Jesús María Ulpiano Troncoso de la Concha; 3 April 1878 San Cristóbal, Dominican Republic
- Died: 30 May 1955 (aged 77) Santo Domingo, Dominican Republic
- Party: Dominican
- Spouse: Silvia Alicia Sánchez Abréu
- Relations: Carlos Morales Troncoso (grandson)
- Education: Professional Institute
- Profession: Attorney
- Nickname: Pipí

Manuel de Jesús María Ulpiano Troncoso de la Concha (3 April 1878 – 30 May 1955) was a Dominican politician and intellectual who was the 38th president of the Dominican Republic from 1940 until 1942. Prior to ascending to the presidency, he was the 23rd vice president under President Jacinto Peynado from 1938 to 1940. Troncoso became president upon the resignation of Peynado. He also served in 1911 during the reign of the Council of Secretaries. He is also known in the Dominican Republic as Pipí.

Troncoso assumed the presidency after President Peynado resigned on 24 February 1940, a few weeks before dying on 7 March. Despite being the president, Troncoso had little power due to the fact that at the time, he was a puppet of Rafael Trujillo, the de facto leader of the country due to his position as generalissimo, the de facto head of state and head of government of the country at the time since Trujillo created that position in 1934.

== Early life and education ==
Troncoso was the son of Jesús María Uladislao Troncoso Troncoso (1855–1923), treasurer and sacristan of the Basilica Cathedral of Santa María la Menor, and Baldomera de la Concha Silva (1844–1923). Manuel was educated at the Conciliar Seminary of St. Thomas Aquinas, graduating with a Bachelor of Philosophy and Letters degree on November 25, 1895. He also was educated in the law, graduating from Professional Institute on April 3, 1899.

== Professional life ==
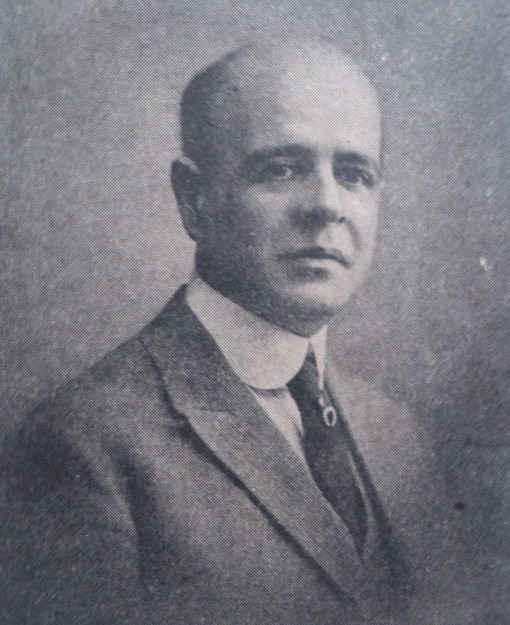
Troncoso in 1920

Troncoso founded the commercial and civil law firm Oficina Troncoso in 1915 in Santo Domingo. He served as a judge in the First Instance, Court of Appeal, and Land Court. He served on the Supreme Court and as Minister of Justice, Minister of Public Instruction, Minister of Industry and Commerce, Minister of Communications, Minister of the Interior, and Attorney General, and Minister of Finance from 1944 to 1945. He was also founding member of the Dominican Academy of History and chairman of its board from 1944 until 1955.

Troncoso was mayor of Santo Domingo as well as president of The National Electoral Board. He was attorney for the International Court and was a professor and dean of the law school and principal of the Autonomous University of Santo Domingo. He served as vice-president of the Republic from 1938 until 1940. After serving as president, Troncoso became President of the Senate from 1943 to 1955. He was coroner of the Judicial District of Santo Domingo from 1911 until the time of his death.

As an author, Troncoso published Elementos de Derecho Administrativo (lit. "Elements of Administrative Law"), Narraciones Dominicanas (lit. "Dominican Narratives"), La Ocupación de Santo Domingo por Haití (lit. "The Occupation of Santo Domingo by Haiti"), El Brigadier Juan Sánchez Ramírez (lit. "Brigadier Juan Sánchez Ramírez"), and Génesis de la Convención Dominico-Americana (lit. "Genesis of the Dominican-American Convention"). He was editor-in-chief of Listín Diario from 1899 to 1911.

== Vice presidency (1938–1940) ==
By 1938, Trujillo had served two terms as president, but then the constitution allowed him to run for a third term due to the fact that there were no term limits at the time. However, being inspired by the US example of two presidential terms despite the 22nd amendment not yet being made into law, thus, Trujillo declined to run for a third term.

Consequently, the Dominican Party nominated Trujillo's vice president and handpicked successor, Jacinto Peynado to be the presidential candidate and Troncoso as the vice presidential candidate in the election held on 16 May. The Peynado-Troncoso ticket unanimously won the election due to the fact that the country was a one-party state at the time.

On 16 August, Peynado was officially sworn in as president with Troncoso as the vice president. However, Trujillo still retained his role as Generalissimo of the Army and the leader of the Dominican Party thus remained the de facto leader of the country and still held the real power.

== Presidency (1940–1942) ==
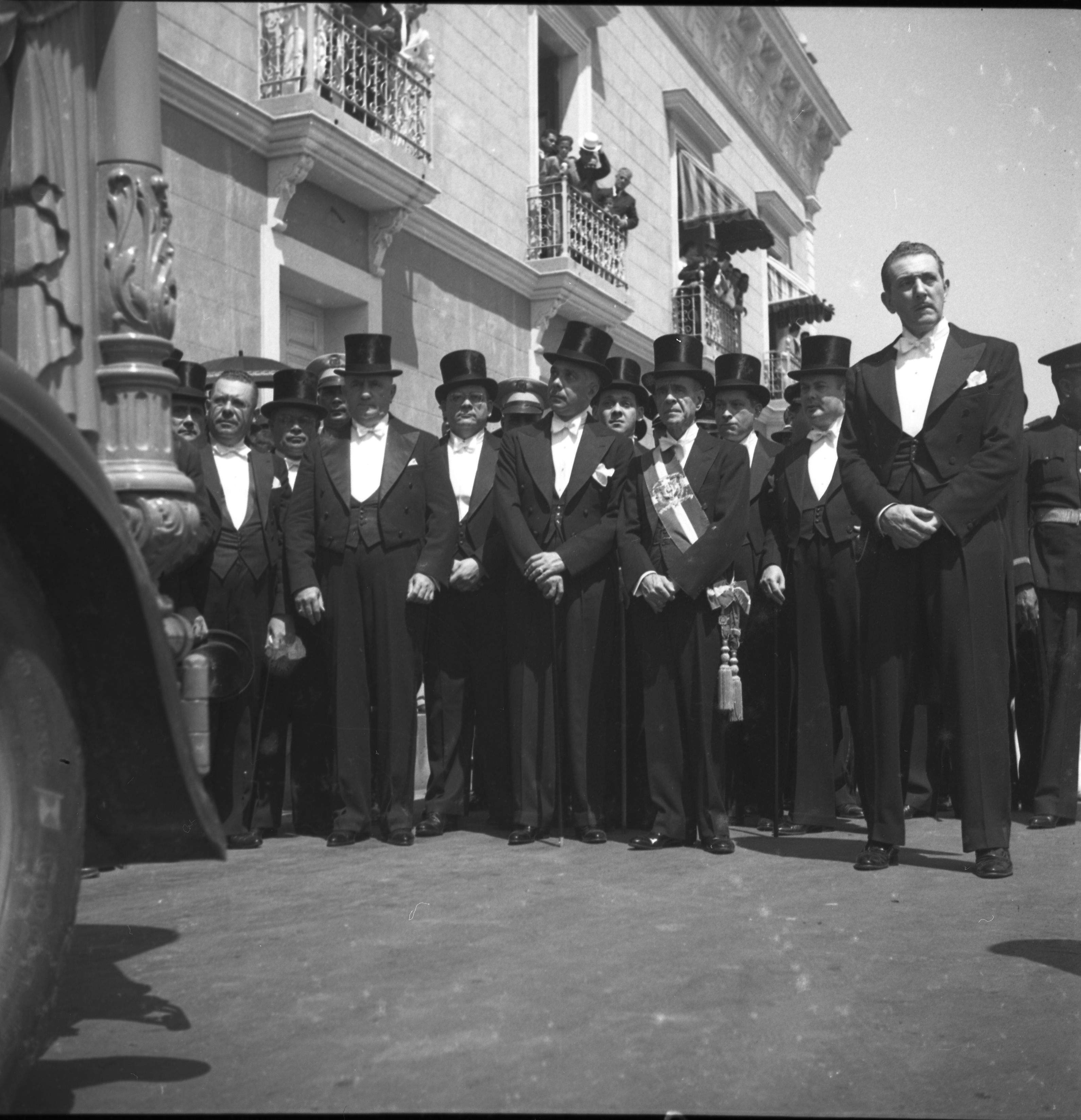
Generalissimo Rafael Trujillo (left) and Troncoso (right) during the funeral of Jacinto Peynado.

In accordance to the constitution, as the vice president at the time, Troncoso became president on 24 February 1940 on the resignation of President Peynado due to poor health despite Rafael Trujillo holding the real power because of his role as generalissimo. A few weeks later, Peynado died on 7 March. Troncoso and Trujillo attended the funeral with other government officials. However, several sources claimed that Peynado remained president till his death and did not resign on 24 February.

On 16 May, elections were held where Trujillo ran, taking inspiration from US President Franklin D. Roosevelt, who ran for a third term two years earlier. Trujillo unanimously won and was sworn in as president for the third time on 16 August. On 17 May 1942, the following day after the election, Troncoso appointed Trujillo as the new Secretary of War and Secretary of the Navy, using the previous resignation of Héctor Trujillo as a legal basis.

== Private life ==
Troncoso married to Silvia Alicia Sánchez Abreu (1882–?), who became the first Dominican electress to ballot her vote on 16 May 1942 after women's suffrage was approved earlier that year. Troncoso and Sánchez had 6 children: Jesús María (1902–1982), who married María Ramírez García and had 1 child, Manuel Troncoso Ramírez (1927–2012); Pedro (1904–1989), who married Olga Hilda Lopez-Penha Alfau and had 2 children; Isabel Genoveva (1906–1991), who married Marino Emilio Cáceres Ureña and had 3 children including Ramón Cáceres Troncoso (b. 1930); Wenceslao (1907–2008), who married Rosa Mercedes Barrera Vega and had 4 children; and Altagracia (1915–1989), who married Eduardo Morales Avelino and had 5 children including Carlos Morales Troncoso (1940–2014).

His sons Jesús María and Wenceslao were, respectively, the first and second governor of the Central Bank of the Dominican Republic; in addition, both of them and their brother Pedro were all prominent lawyers and jurists in the Dominican Republic. Wenceslao was deputy, senator, and ambassador, as well, while Pedro was Chief Justice of the Supreme Court (1946–1949).

== Ancestry ==
Ancestors of Manuel Troncoso de la Concha

2. Jesús María Uladislao Troncoso (1855–1923)
10. Manuel Troncoso Medina
5. María Antonia Troncoso Guillén (1822–1916)
11. María Anselma Guillén de Ayala
1. Manuel de Jesús Ulpiano Troncoso de la Concha (1878–1955)
12. José Lucas de la Concha Negrette; Captaincy General of Puerto Rico
6. Félix Wenceslao de la Concha Petreño (1811–1880)
13. María Vicenta Petreño Ortiz
3. Baldomera Merced de la Concha Silva (1844–1923)
7. Leocadia Silva Troncoso

Government offices
Preceded by Jacinto Peynado	Vice President of the Dominican Republic; 1938–1940	Succeeded by Joaquín Balaguer
Preceded by Jacinto Peynado	President of the Dominican Republic; 1940–1942	Succeeded by Rafael Trujillo
Preceded by Augusto A. Júpiter	Chairman of the Central Electoral Board of the Dominican Republic; 1926–1930	Succeeded by Domingo A. Estrada
Senate of the Dominican Republic
Preceded by Porfirio Herrera Velásquez	President of the Senate of the Dominican Republic; 1943–1955	Succeeded by Mario Fermín Cabral y Báez
Educational offices
Preceded by Juan Tomás Mejía	Rector of the University of Santo Domingo; 1935–1938	Succeeded by Julio Ortega Frier
Academic offices
Preceded by Federico Henríquez y Carvajal	Chairman of the Dominican Academy of History; 1944–1955	Succeeded by Emilio Rodríguez Demorizi
Business positions
First	Chairman of Troncoso & Cáceres; 1915–1955	Succeeded by Jesús María Troncoso
