= Cristina Rodríguez =

Cristina Rodríguez may refer to:

- Cristina Rodríguez (journalist) (born 1972), Spanish journalist and writer
- Cristina Rodríguez (noble) (born 1075), daughter of El Cid and Jimena Díaz
- Cristina Rodríguez (stylist) (born 1969), Spanish hairstylist, actress and TV presenter
- Cristina Rodríguez Cabral (born 1959), Uruguayan poet, researcher, and Afro-Uruguayan activist

== See also ==
- Cristina Rodrigues (disambiguation)
