= Bernardo Vega =

Dominican polymath

- Born: Julio Bernardo Vega de Boyrie; 23 February 1938 (age 88); Santiago de los Caballeros, Dominican Republic
- Occupations: Academic, politician
- Spouse: 1. Cynthia Guerra Pellerano (deceased); 2. Soledad Álvarez Jacques
- Children: 3
- Parents: Julio Vega Batlle (father); Teresa de Boyrie y Moya (mother)
- Relatives: Amelia Vega (second cousin-once removed)

Chairperson of the Dominican Academy of History
- In office 1 August 2013 – 13 July 2016
- Deputy: Mu-Kien Adriana Sang
- Preceded by: Frank Moya Pons
- Succeeded by: Mu-Kien Adriana Sang

Dominican Ambassador to Washington, D.C.
- In office appointed January 9, 1997 accredited February 11, 1997 – November 29, 1999
- Preceded by: José del Carmen Ariza Gomez
- Succeeded by: Roberto Bernardo Saladín Selín

Governor of the Central Bank of the Dominican Republic
- In office August 1982 – May 1984
- Preceded by: Carlos Roberto Despradel Roques
- Succeeded by: José E. Santos Taveras

Julio Bernardo Vega de Boyrie (born February 23, 1938), most known as Bernardo Vega, is a Dominican academic, anthropologist, central banker, diplomat, economist, historian, politician, politologist, pollster, sociologist and writer.

== Early life ==
Bernardo Vega was born in Santiago de los Caballeros, Dominican Republic on February 23, 1938. He is the son of Dominican writer Julio Vega Batlle and María Teresa de Boyrie de Moya. He completed his primary education in Santiago de los Caballeros and later earned a Degree in economics from the University of Pennsylvania, United States in 1959.

== Career ==
Vega has also held many important public offices, including: Member of the Central Bank's Monetary Board (1975-1981), Director of the Museum of Dominican Man (1978-1982), Governor of the Central Bank of the Dominican Republic (1982-1984) and Ambassador to Washington (1996 -1998). He taught economics at the Pontifical Catholic University Mother and Teacher and the Autonomous University of Santo Domingo. Vega has won the National History Award four times (1986, 1989, 1990, 1991).

== Bibliography ==
- Bernardo Vega (2007). Dominican Cultures: The Making of a Caribbean Society. Markus Wiener Publishers. ISBN 978-1-55876-434-7.

Government offices
Preceded by Carlos Roberto Despradel Roques	Governor of the Central Bank of the Dominican Republic; 1982–1984	Succeeded by José Enrique Santos Taveras
Diplomatic posts
Preceded by José del Carmen Ariza	Ambassador of the Dominican Republic to the United States; 1997–1999	Succeeded by Roberto B. Saladín Selín
Academic offices
Preceded by Frank Moya Pons	Chairman of the Dominican Academy of History; 2013–2016	Succeeded by Mu-Kien Adriana Sang
