= San Nicola Arcella =

- Comune
- Comune di San Nicola Arcella
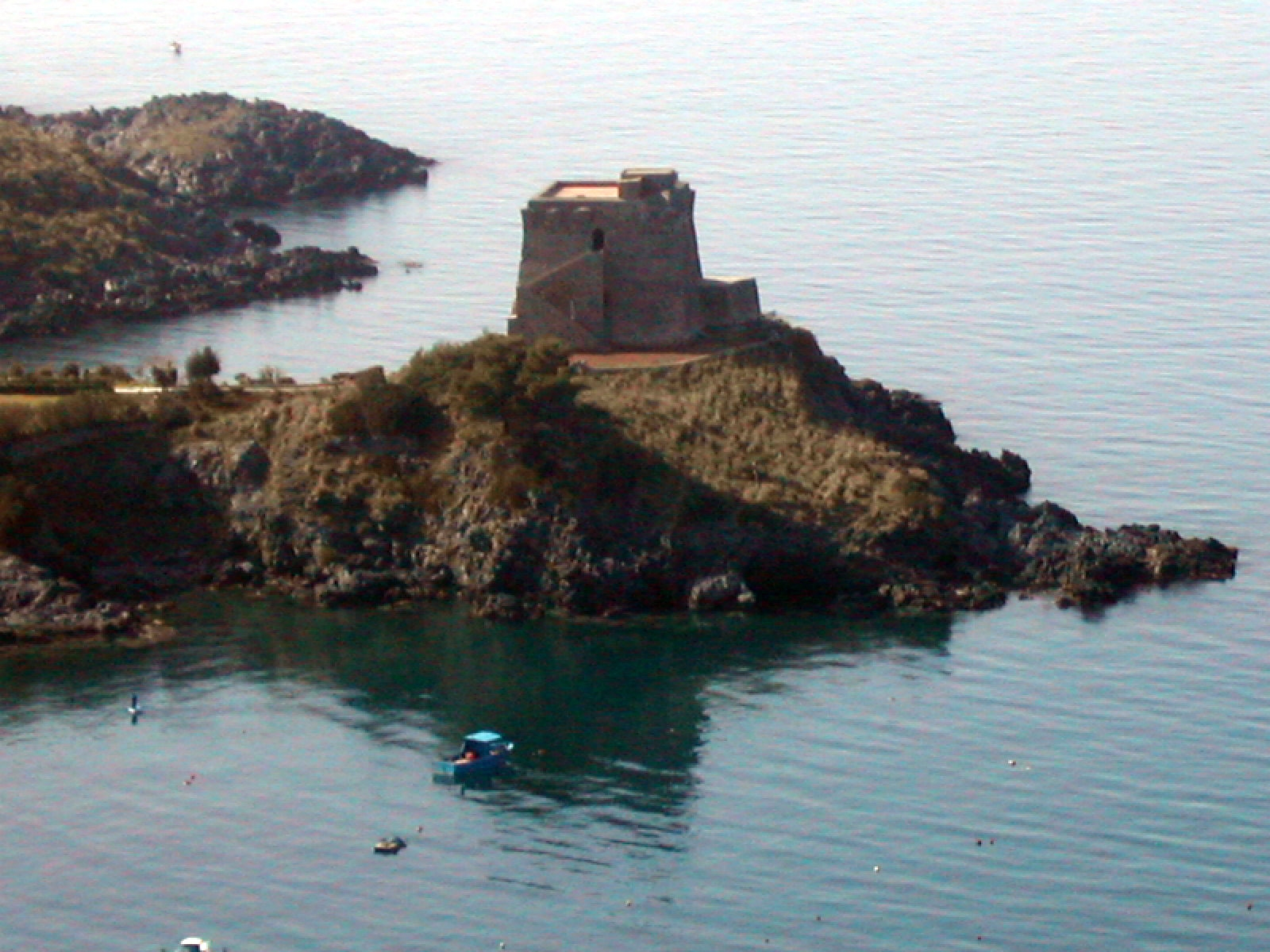

- Location within Italy Location within Calabria
- Coordinates: 39°51′N 15°48′E
- Country: Italy
- Region: Calabria
- Province: Cosenza (CS)

Government
  - Mayor: Eugenio Madeo

Area
  - Total: 11.69 km^{2} (4.51 sq mi)
- Elevation: 110 m (360 ft)

Population (2018)
  - Total: 1,995
  - Density: 170.7/km^{2} (442.0/sq mi)
- Time zone: UTC+1 (CET)
  - Summer (DST): UTC+2 (CEST)
- Postal code: 87020
- Dialing code: 0985
- Website: Official website

San Nicola Arcella is a town and comune in the province of Cosenza in the Calabria region of southern Italy.

American writer Francis Marion Crawford lived in a coastal tower at San Nicola in the late 19th century.
