= Len Cabral =

American storyteller

- Born: April 24, 1948 (age 78); North Providence, Rhode Island
- Occupations: Storyteller, entertainer, community leader

Len Cabral is an American storyteller who was awarded the Circle of Excellence in 2001 by the National Storytelling Network after being recognized by his peers as a master storyteller.

== Biography ==
Cabral, whose grandparents came from Cape Verde, was born in North Providence, Rhode Island, on 24 April 1948. In the early 1970s, he worked in a day care center, where he realised the power of storytelling to entertain children and to teach them how to listen and communicate. In 1976, he began traveling to tell stories to school children, adults and senior citizens, firstly within New England, and then across the US. He tells traditional folk tales from Cape Verde, Native America, the Caribbean, and other places around the world, as well yarns from his own life. Among his stories are tales of Anansi, Tubino and Nho Lobo, Coyote and Old Man Winter and other 'how and why' tales. He is well known for his enthusiastic hand gestures and character voices. He performs at storytelling festivals across the country and internationally, and is a regular performer at the National Storytelling Festival.

== Selected works ==
- 1996 - Stories for the Wee Folk (audiocassette / CD)
- 1996 - It's How You Say It (audiocassette / CD)
- 1997 - Len Cabral's Storytelling Book

== Awards ==
- Parents' Choice Silver Honor award for It's How You Say It
- National Storytelling Network Circle of Excellence, 2001

== See also ==
- Storytelling
- Storytelling festival
