= Ethnic Chinese in the Dominican Republic =

Chinese in the Dominican Republic
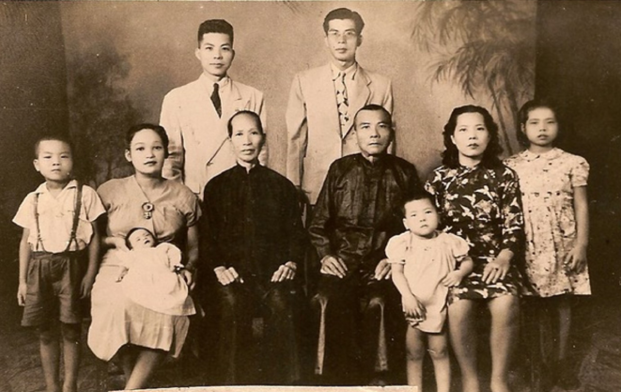
- Chinese migrant family in Dominican Republic, circa 1940s.

Total population
- 60,000

Regions with significant populations
- Santo Domingo · Puerto Plata · Samaná.

Languages
- Dominican Spanish · Frespañol · Chinese

Religion
- Buddhism · Christianity

Related ethnic groups
- Chinese Caribbean

The Chinese community in the Dominican Republic forms one of the largest Chinese communities in Latin America. As of 2012, there are over 3,600 recorded Chinese-born Dominican residents. Although no official census has been made, there are estimates of approximately 60,000 people of Chinese origin living in the country. Chinese descendants living in the Dominican Republic may be referred as Chinese Dominicans (Spanish: Dominicanos Chinos).

== History ==
=== 19th century ===
The first recorded mention of a Chinese presence in the Dominican Republic was in 1864 during the Dominican Restoration War, with references to a man named “Pancho el Chino,” who fought in the War. There are also reports that a businessman named Gregorio Riva brought a handful of Chinese laborers over from Cuba to make bricks and quicklime in the Cibao region. This group of Chinese immigrants eventually built warehouses in Samaná, Yuna and Moca. By 1870 the Chinese migrants had built the cemetery in Moca. By 1878 the presence of Chinese-Dominicans in Puerto Plata had increased thanks to the work of General Segundo Imbert, who was Governor of Puerto Plata.

=== 20th century ===
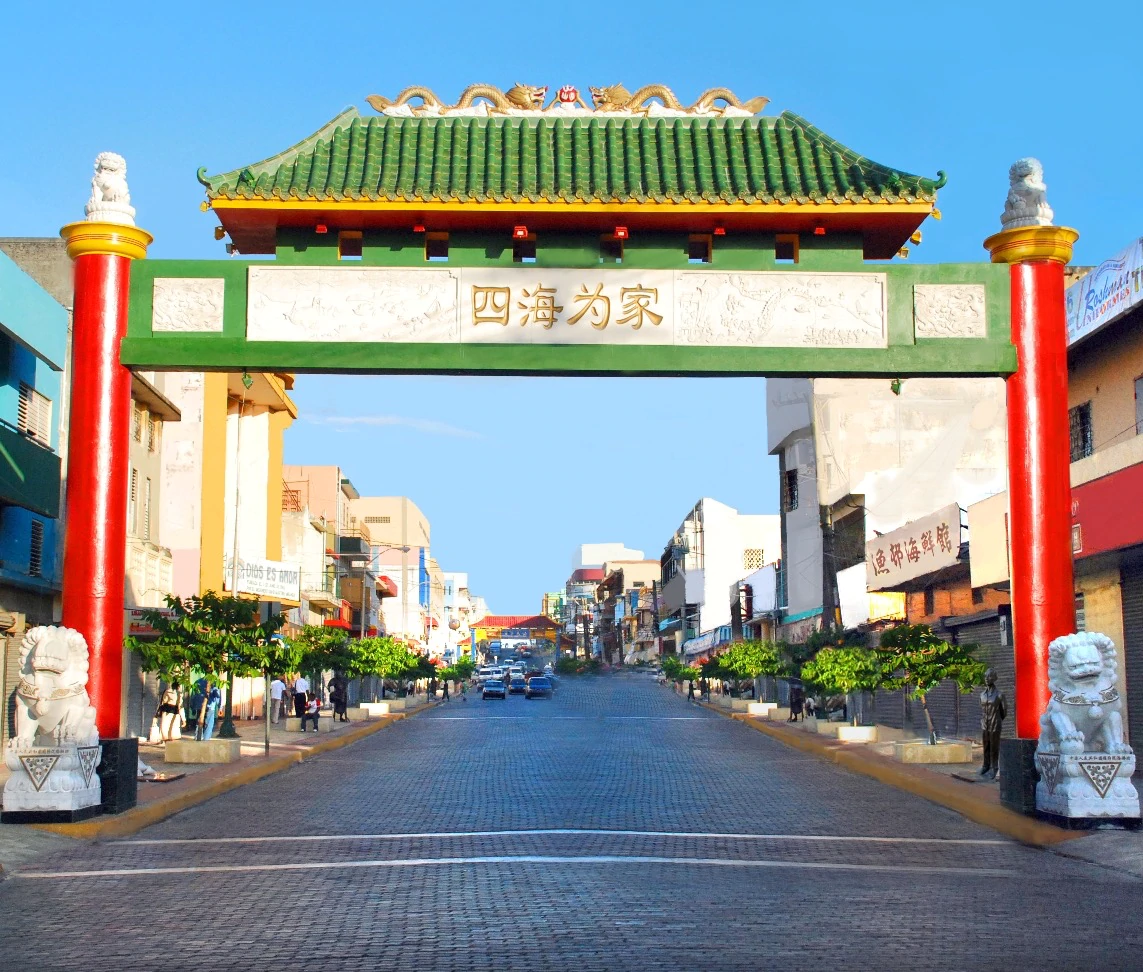
Chinatown in Santo Domingo, Dominican Republic

A large influx of Chinese came during the American occupation of the Dominican Republic in 1916 to 1924, when ethnic Chinese came over to take part in the rapid economic expansion that resulted from the occupation. In 1937, there was an increased number of Chinese migrants that came to the Dominican Republic due to the Sino-Japanese war. In 1944 an official Chinese office was opened in the Dominican Republic and in 1945 a branch of the Chinese National Party was also opened in the country. By the 1950s Chinese-Dominicans had established a small niche in the Duarte area of Santo Domingo and most of the businesses in that part of the city were Chinese-owned. Since Chinese migration had declined during the 1960s and 1970s, the community's growth was limited.

For many years, Chinese immigrants to the Dominican Republic have integrated into the local Dominican community. Unlike their counterparts in other countries, Chinese culture began to take a back seat and become less visible. But a new wave of migration during the early 1990s has sparked new interest about the Chinese community in the country and revived the notion of the need to remember the contributions of past generations.

== Chinese organizations in the Dominican Republic ==
The "Flor Para Todos Foundation" is the non-profit Chinese cultural organization in the Dominican Republic that promotes cooperation, education, communication, art and the general integration of Chinese culture in the Caribbean. The overall goal of the Flor Para Todos Foundation is to help in the creation of the Santo Domingo Barrio Chino (Chinatown) with the intention of strengthening the relationship between the Dominican and Chinese communities.

== Santo Domingo's Chinatown ==
The original idea for a Chinatown in Santo Domingo was conceived in the early 1990s, but it took some years before the idea was to materialize. Chinatown took one step closer to becoming a reality when the organization Flor Para Todos was recognized.

On 8 December 2004, through an agreement with the Santo Domingo municipal authorities, the Foundation was given the go-ahead to start construction on the project. Aside from the agreement with the city municipality, agreements with the Tourism Ministry were signed to promote Chinatown as a tourist attraction, agreements with the Culture Ministry were signed in order to develop cultural activities and an agreement with the Police Department was signed in order to increase police protection in the area. Santo Domingo's Chinatown was officially inaugurated as a Chinatown in 2006.

== Notable Chinese Dominicans ==
- Lian Qian (born 1983), table tennis player
- Lin Ju (born 1979), table tennis player
- Wu Xue (born 1980), table tennis player
- Mu-Kien Adriana Sang (born 1955), historian

== See also ==
- Chinese Caribbean
  - Chinese Cuban
  - Chinese Haitian
- Asian Latin American
- Japanese settlement in the Dominican Republic
- China–Dominican Republic relations
