= Flávio Cabral =

American painter (1918–1990)

- Born: July 3, 1916; New York, NY, U.S.
- Died: March 22, 1990 (aged 73); Los Angeles, CA, U.S.
- Known for: Murals

Flávio E. Cabral (July 7, 1916 – March 22, 1990) was an American mural artist.

== Life ==
Cabral was born in New York City of Portuguese parents who resided on the island of Trinidad, in the West Indies. He lived in New York City until 1936 when his family moved to Los Angeles where he settled for the remainder of his life. As a young artist, he received much of his training through his work and affiliation with the Federal Arts Project under the administration of President Franklin D. Roosevelt. In 1955 he earned a Bachelor of Arts Degree in art education. The following year he attained a Master of Arts Degree in Painting from the State University at Los Angeles. He was a professor of painting and art history for over thirty years at Los Angeles Valley College.

== Reproduced in ==
- "American Painting and Sculpting" University of Illinois
- "The Realm of Contemporary Still Life Painting"
- "Oil Painting Techniques and Materials"
- "Who's Who in the West"
- 1963 – 60 ft. mural for Robert Fulton Jr. High School*
