= Cristina Rodríguez Cabral =

- Born: 26 May 1959 (age 67); Montevideo
- Education: University of Missouri
- Occupations: Writer, poet, and researcher

Cristina Rodríguez Cabral (born 26 May 1959) is an Uruguayan poet, researcher, and Afro-Uruguayan activist.

== Biography ==
Rodríguez has a degree in sociology and nursing, a profession that she practiced for some time in Uruguay. She continued her academic training at the University of Missouri, where she obtained her PhD. She currently resides in the United States of America, where she works as a researcher and university professor.

Rodríguez took an interest in literature at 11 years of age. Her first publications were published by the organization Mundo Afro, which campaigned for the equal rights of African diaspora in Uruguayan. In 1986, her work Bahía, mágica Bahía won the Casa de las Américas Prize. Currently, Rodríguez Cabral is an international reference in Afro-Uruguayan literature, and one of the few living afro-descendant writers to whom academic studies have been dedicated.

In general, Rodríguez's work deals with marginalization and oppression on the grounds of race and gender. There is, in her works, "a need to remember and reaffirm the inherited values of both our family and Africa." Her initial works are focused on her feelings and intimate experiences from the perspective of a black Hispanic-American woman. In her post-1995 works, she introduces themes related to social militancy, racism and cultural identity.
