= Manuel del Cabral =

Dominican writer and diplomat (1907–1999)

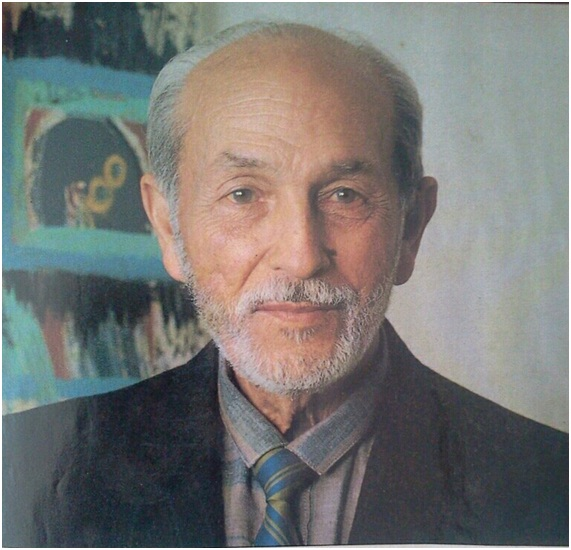
- Born: Manuel Antonio Cabral Tavárez; 7 March 1907; Santiago de los Caballeros, Dominican Republic
- Died: 14 May 1999 (aged 92); Santo Domingo, Dominican Republic
- Occupation: Writer
- Spouse: Alba María Cornero
- Children: Peggy, Alejandro, Amelia & Chinchina Cabral

Manuel del Cabral (7 March 1907 – 14 May 1999) was a Dominican poet, writer, and diplomat. The son of Mario Fermín Cabral y Báez, an influential senator during the "Era of Trujillo", he served at the Embassy of the Dominican Republic to Argentina. During his long stay in Buenos Aires, he married an Argentine and fathered his 4 children, among them, the television journalist and politician Peggy Cabral. In 1992 he was awarded the Premio Nacional de Literatura.

== Work and reception ==
Cabral has become one of the most celebrated writers of the Dominican Republic, enjoying international fame. His work is most often viewed as an essential representation of Afro-Antillean or Afro-Caribbean poetry, known alternatively as negrismo or poesía negra (black poetry) in Spanish, along with the works of Cuban Nicolás Guillén and Puerto Rican Luis Palés Matos.

Cabral is known for his vast exploration of themes. Perennial human concerns such as love, death, metaphysics, and war occur throughout his writings. Additionally, social and political issues, especially those involving Antillean and Dominican identity, as well as the exploitation of Afro-Caribbeans are prominent in his writings.

Cabral first gained recognition with Compadre Mon (1943), often considered the best example of a Dominican Epic. Compadre Mon, like Trópico Negro and other major works, center around themes of labor and social injustice.

Ancestors of Manuel del Cabral

16. Juan Marcos Cabral y Aybar
8. Melchor María Cabral y Luna (1815–?)
17. María Ramona de Luna y Andújar (1787–?)
4. Marcos Ezequiel Antonio Cabral y Figueredo (1843–1903)
18. Gervasio Figueredo Lamsar
9. Águeda Figueredo Rivera (1821–1877)
19. Micaela Rivera Figueredo
2. Mario Fermín Cabral y Báez (1877–1961)
20. Pablo Altagracia Báez (†1840)
10. Ramón Buenaventura Báez Méndez (1812–1884)
21. Teresa de Jesús Méndez
5. Altagracia Amelia Báez Andújar (†1879)
22. Juan Pablo Andújar de Soto
11. María Fermina Andújar de Soto
23. María Francisca de Soto Fernández
1. Manuel Antonio Cabral Tavárez (1907–1999)
24. Pedro Tavares Tineo
12. Manuel de Jesús Tavares Reyes
25. Úrsula Reyes
6. Vicente Trinidad Tavares Portes (1839–1923)
26. Pedro de Portes e Infante
13. María Altagracia Portes y Morell de Santa Cruz
27. Ana Morell de Santa Cruz y Paredes
3. Amelia Josefa Tavares Saviñón (1877–1924)
14. Rafael Saviñón
7. María de la Antigua Saviñón Villa (1848–1906)
30. Juan Ramón Villa Jáquez (1781–1843)
15. María Lorenza Matilde Villa del Orbe (1818–?)
31. María de la Antigua del Orbe Bocanegra

=== Diplomacy ===
Manuel del Cabral was ambassador to the United States, Peru, Colombia, Brazil, Chile, Spain and Argentina. In the late 1950s he defected and sought political asylum in Argentina, where he lived for 17 years with his family.

== Works ==
- Trópico Negro. 1942
- Compadre Mon. Espiral, Colombia 1943
- Chinchina Busca el Tiempo. Perlado, Buenos Aires 1945 (Ed. de Colores, Santo Domingo 1998, ISBN 84-89539-64-2)
- De Este Lado del Mar. Impresora Dominicana, Ciudad Trujillo 1949
- Antología Tierra (1930–1949). Ediciones Cultura Hispánica, Madrid 1949
- Carta a Rubén. Madrid 1950
- Los Huéspedes Secretos. Madrid 1950 (Ed. Corripio, Santo Domingo 1988),
- Segunda Antología Tierra (1930–1951). Gráficas García, Madrid 1951
- 30 Parábolas. Lucania, Buenos Aires 1956
- Antología Clave (1930–1956). Losada, Buenos Aires 1957
- 14 Nudos de Amor. Losada, Buenos Aires 1963
- El Escupido. Quintaria, Buenos Aires 1970 (Ed. de Colores, Santo Domingo 1987)
- El Presidente Negro. Ediciones Carlos Lohlé, Buenos Aires 1973 (Canahuate, Santo Domingo 1990)
- Poemas de Amor y Sexo. Ediciones de la Flor, Buenos Aires 1974
- Cuentos. Ediciones Orión, Buenos Aires 1976
- Antología Tres. Editora Universitaria, Santo Domingo 1983
- Obra Poética Completa, Ed. Alfa & Omega, Santo Domingo 1987
- Antología Poética, E. Biblioteca Nacional, Buenos Aires 1998. ISBN 987-96390-4-9
- Antología de Cuentos, E. Biblioteca Nacional, Buenos Aires 1998. ISBN 987-96390-5-7

== Bibliography ==
- Wena Monica Palmer: Social consciousness and compromiso in selected writings of Manuel del Cabral. University of the West Indies, Mona, Jamaica, 1982
- (in Spanish) Manuel Antonio Arango L.: Historia, intrahistoria y compromiso social en siete poetas hispánicos. Rubén Darío, Federico García Lorca, Nicolás Guillén, Manuel del Cabral, Palés Matos, César Vallejo y Pablo Neruda, Lang 2007, ISBN 978-0-8204-8690-1
- Gutiérrez, Franklin. Antología histórica de la poesía dominicana del siglo XX (1912–1995). New York: Ediciones Alcance, 1995.
- Diaz, Andrés Blanco. Manuel del Cabral y su obra: comentarios y critica. Santo Domingo, Dominican Republic: Comisión Permanente de la Feria del Libro, 2001.
- Bejel, Emilio. "Poetry." A History of Literature in the Caribbean. Vol. 1. Arnold, A. James. Ed. Philadelphia: John Benjamins Publishing Company, 1994.
- Torres-Saillant, Silvio. "Dominican Literature and Its Criticism: Anatomy of a Troubled Identity." A History of Literature in the Caribbean. Vol. 1. Arnold, A. James. Ed. Philadelphia: John Benjamins Publishing Company, 1994.
- Torres-Saillant, Silvio. Caribbean Poetics: Towards an Aesthetic of West Indian Literature. New York: Cambridge University Press, 1997.
- Rodríguez, Linda M. "Dominican Republic." Encyclopedia of Latin American Literature. Ed. Verity Smith. Chicago: Fitzroy Dearborn, 1997.
- Burdiez, Tómas Castro. Ed. La magia de lo permanente: antología poética de Manuel del Cabral. Santo Domingo, Dominican Republic: Editorial Ciguapa, 2001.
