= Julio Vega Batlle =

Dominican writer and diplomat

Julio Vega Batlle (May 6, 1899 – April 23, 1973) was a Dominican writer, publishing both plays and novels, and a diplomat. He was born in Santiago de los Caballeros, and graduated from the University of Santo Domingo. He became a judge, and served as a diplomat for the Dominican Republic on missions to London, England; Havana, Cuba; and Rio de Janeiro, Brazil.

He married Teresa de Boyrie de Moya, daughter of Louis Emile de Boyrie Pillot (of French origin) and Mercedes Antonia de Moya y Moya (from an upper-class Dominican family); they begat three sons: Wenceslao Nicolás, Bernardo, and Luis Eduardo “Eddy”.

== Ancestry ==
Ancestors of Julio Vega Batlle

16. Juan Manuel de la Vega
8. José Rafael Vega Bravo
17. Isabel María Bravo Rubio
4. José Rafael Vega Pichardo (1844–1897)
18. José Cayetano Pichardo Tejada
9. Margarita Crescencia Pichardo Contreras
19. Mª. Dolores Contreras Mestre
2. José Nicolás Vega Llenas (1867–1925)
20. Joseph Llenas Colomer (1783–?)
10. Joaquim Zenon Joseph Llenas Baralt (1816–1855)
21. Teresa Baralt Cahué (1785–?)
5. Mª. Amelia Llenas Díaz (1847–1920)
22. José Díaz Morel
11. Tomasina Díaz Durán
23. María Durán
1. Julio Vega Batlle (1899–1973)
24. Juan Pablo Batlle
12. Jaime Batlle Amat
25. Magdalena Amat
6. José Joaquín Batlle Filbá (1844–1899)
26. Josep Filbà
13. Rosa Filbà i Vilardell
27. Francesca Vilardell
3. Mª. Asunción Batlle Espaillat (1876–1972)
28. Pedro Ramón Espaillat Velilla (1796–1882)
14. Ulises Francisco Espaillat Quiñones (1823–1878)
29. Mª. Petronila Quiñones Tavares (1804−1874)
7. Mª. Dolores “Lola” Espaillat Espaillat (1853–1936)
30. Juan José Espaillat Velilla (1794–1828)
15. Eloísa Espaillat Rodríguez (1818–1919)
31. Mª. Magdalena Rodríguez de Rojas

Diplomatic posts
Preceded by	Ambassador of the Dominican Republic to the United Kingdom	Succeeded by
Educational offices
Preceded by Julio Ortega Frier	Rector of the University of Santo Domingo; 1947–1949	Succeeded by Pedro Troncoso Sánchez
