= Mario Fermín Cabral y Báez =

Dominican politician (1877–1961)

Mario Fermín Cabral y Báez (b. 1877, Baní – d. 1961, Santo Domingo) was a politician from the Dominican Republic. He was Senator for the Province of Santiago, and also the President of the Senate of the Dominican Republic three times: 1914–1916, 1930–1938, and 1955.

== Career ==
During his tenure as senator he drafted the bill that in 1935 renamed the Dominican capital, Santo Domingo, Trujillo City in honour of dictator Rafael Trujillo. He also promoted in 1943 the construction of Centro de Los Heroes in the capital city.

== Family ==
Cabral y Báez was the son of Marcos Antonio Cabral y Figueredo and Altagracia Amelia Báez Andújar (daughter of President Buenaventura Báez). On 24 November 1900, Cabral y Báez married Amelia Josefa Tavares Saviñón, and they had four children: María Estela, Pura Amelia, Manuel Antonio and Ramón Cabral Tavares.

After his first wife died, Cabral y Báez married María Josefa Tavares Tineo, and they had one daughter, Altagracia Amelia Cabral Tavares. With Sixta América Stéfani, an Italian-Dominican, he had another daughter, Dulce Enilda Altagracia Cabral Stéfani (1925–2008).

Ancestors of Mario Fermín Cabral y Báez

16. Marcos Cabral Valera (†1838); Hincha, Colony of Santo Domingo
8. Juan Marcos Cabral y Aybar (1792–1853); Hincha, Colony of Santo Domingo
17. María Aybar de Luna; Hincha, Colony of Santo Domingo
4. Melchor María Cabral y Luna (1815–?); Baní, Colony of Santo Domingo
18. Blas de Luna Franco; Hincha, Colony of Santo Domingo
9. María Ramona de Luna y Andújar (1787–1877); Hincha, Colony of Santo Domingo
19. María Francisca Andújar de Soto (daughter of #28 and #29); Hincha, Colony of Santo Domingo
2. Marcos Ezequiel Antonio Cabral y Figueredo (1842–1903); Bany, Ozama Department, Haiti
20. Domingo Figueredo Pérez (†1809; brother of #23); Bánica, Colony of Santo Domingo
10. Gervasio Figueredo Lamsar; Bánica, Colony of Santo Domingo
21. Margarita Lamsar Montás; Cap-Français, Colony of Saint Domingue
5. Águeda Figueredo Rivera (1821–1877)Baní, Colony of Santo Domingo
22. Fernando Rivera Andújar; Bánica, Colony of Santo Domingo
11. Micaela Rivera Figueredo; Hincha, Colony of Santo Domingo
23. Juliana Figueredo Pérez (†1817; sister of #20); Bánica, Colony of Santo Domingo
1. Mario Fermín Cabral y Báez (1877–1961); Baní, Dominican Republic
24. Antonio Sánchez de Valverde y Díaz de Ocaña (ca. 1730–ca. 1790); Bayaguana, Colony of Santo Domingo
12. Pablo Altagracia Báez (†1840); Azua, Colony of Santo Domingo
25. Josefa Morales [de Filpo]; Spain
6. Ramón Buenaventura Báez Méndez (1812–1884); Cabral, Colony of Santo Domingo
13. Teresa de Jesús Méndez (ca. 1788–1873); Cabral, Colony of Santo Domingo
3. Altagracia Amelia Báez Andújar (†1879)
28. Juan Evangelista de Andújar y Valera; Hincha, Colony of Santo Domingo
14. Juan Pablo Andújar de Soto (brother of #19); Hincha, Colony of Santo Domingo
29. María Francisca de Soto y Franco (sister of #30); Hincha, Colony of Santo Domingo
7. María Fermina Andújar de Soto; Hincha, Colony of Santo Domingo
30. Manuel de Soto y Franco (brother of #29); Hincha, Colony of Santo Domingo
15. María Francisca de Soto Fernández; Hincha, Colony of Santo Domingo
31. Antonia Fernández Molina; Hincha, Colony of Santo Domingo

Senate of the Dominican Republic
Preceded by Leovigildo Cuello; 1913–14	President of the Senate of the Dominican Republic; 1914–1916	Vacant United States occupation of the Dominican Republic (1916–24) Title next held by Gustavo Adolfo Díaz Lamarche (1924–30)
Preceded by Gustavo Adolfo Díaz Lamarche; 1924–30	President of the Senate of the Dominican Republic; 1930–1938	Succeeded by Porfirio Herrera Velásquez; 1938–42
Preceded by Manuel de Jesús Troncoso de la Concha; 1942–55	President (interim) of the Senate of the Dominican Republic; 1955	Succeeded by Porfirio Herrera Velásquez; 1955–62
