= Amadeo Barletta Barletta =

Italian entrepreneur who migrated to the Caribbean

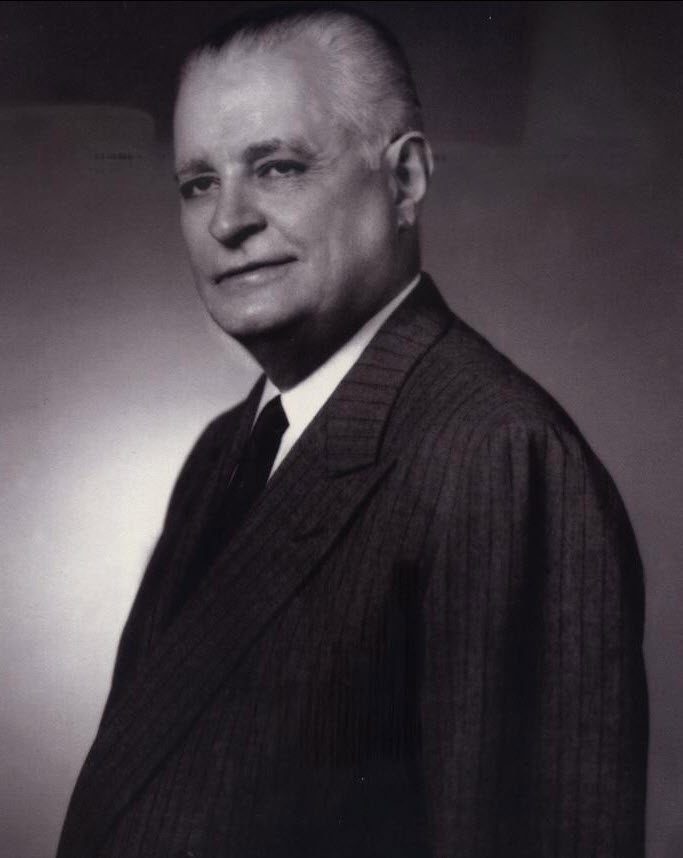
- Born: 1894; San Nicola Arcella, Italy
- Died: 1975 (aged 80–81); Santo Domingo, Dominican Republic
- Occupation: Businessman

Amadeo Barletta Barletta was an Italian businessman who migrated to the Caribbean in the early years of the 20th century, spending time in Dominican Republic, where he served as ambassador under Benito Mussolini, and later Cuba, where his properties were nationalized following the Cuban Revolution.

== Biography ==
Curiously for an immigrant who transformed the urban landscape of Havana and other Latin American cities with the massive introduction of General Motors vehicles, the year of his birth coincided with the launching of Benz Velo the first standardized car by Karl Benz.

He was born in the small village of San Nicola Arcella in the poor region of Calabria, where he attended elementary school and earned his first income writing letters and documents for the villagers who appreciated his exceptionally good calligraphy. At the early age of 17 he migrated from Italy to Puerto Rico via New York during the summer of 1912. His records are registered in the historical archives of Ellis Island, the only port of entry to America at that time, where he declared to be 18 years old.

=== Dominican Republic ===
Amadeo moved to the Dominican Republic in 1920 and founded Santo Domingo Motor Company, the first Chevrolet dealership in the country. Rafael Trujillo, dictator of the Dominican Republic, purchased stock in the company. In Dominican Republic he engaged in the tobacco business, breaking Trujillo's monopoly with a U.S.A. company. In 1935 Trujillo charged Barletta with conspiring to assassinate him, incarcerating him. Barletta was the Honorary Consul of Italy appointed by Benito Mussolini. Trujillo cancelled his consular credentials by a decree and confiscated his properties and his Tobacco Company. Barletta's car was gifted by Trujillo to his chief of police. Benito Mussolini made moves to get his consul out of jail, demanded reimbursement for all losses as a result of Barletta's imprisonment and a $200,000 indemnity. Meanwhile General Motors and Barletta's tobacco company made representations to the US Department of State to try and get him out of prison and defend their business interests. He was held incommunicado for six weeks before being released on bail set at $50,000. It was reported that Mussolini had threatened to send a warship should he not be released, while the US Ambassador to the Dominican Republic, Roberto Despradel, personally conveyed to Trujillo the Secretary of State Cordell Hull's desire for Barletta's immediate release.

=== Cuba ===
Barletta moved to Cuba in 1939 and became the first exclusive distributor of General Motors, outside the United States. According to a 1940 intelligence report compiled by the U.S. War Department, Amadeo was alleged to be an "ardent fascist". The report concludes that steps would be taken "with the view to have Barletta removed". On 7 February 1942 the FBI put him on their blacklist. He was to be arrested and have his property confiscated but Barletta was tipped off and fled to Argentina. After the war in 1945 he returned to Cuba, where he continued to work for General Motors. He also became a sales agent for Cadillac, Chevrolet, Oldsmobile, and other American car companies operating in the country. In Havana he built an eleven-story building on Infanta Street known as Ambar Motors. He also financed the Cuban television station Channel 2 and possessed a controlling interest in the newspaper El Mundo. Various of his businesses functioned as fronts for criminal activities such as narcotics trafficking and trafficking in gems. At Barletta's Ambar Motors Meyer Lansky ran a gambling dealer training school.

From 1950 to 1959 his businesses grow and diversify. He was the owner and editor of "El Mundo", one of the largest Cuban newspapers during the 1950s, and was also the exclusive representative for General Motors in Cuba, Venezuela and the Dominican Republic. In 1960, after the Cuban Revolution, Fidel Castro expropriated all of Barletta's businesses and he was granted amnesty at the Italian embassy in Havana. He had owned forty-three businesses, worth a combined $43 million.

=== Later life ===
In 1962 right after Rafael Trujillo's assassination, he moves back to the Dominican Republic and he reorganize his old car business. In 1964 he obtains distribution exclusivity for Nissan.

He died in the Dominican Republic (October 27, 1975).

== Legacy ==
Amadeo Barletta Barletta married Nelia Ricart and had two children, Amadeo Barletta Jr., who was born in Santo Domingo, Dominican Republic in 1923, and Nelia Filomena Barletta Ricart, also born in Santo Domingo, Dominican Republic in 1932.

Amadeo Barletta Ricart married Laura Amelia Vicini Cabral and there are no descendants from this marriage. Amadeo Jr. died in January 1st, 1976.

Nelia Filomena Barletta Ricart married Miguel Morales Abreu, the son of Miguel Morales y Calvo de la Puerta, marquess of Valle-Siciliana, and had two children: Miguel Morales Barletta and Nelia Morales Barletta.
