= Donald Reid Cabral =

Dominican politician and lawyer (1923–2006)

Acting President of the Dominican Republic
- In office 28 December 1963 – 25 April 1965
- Vice President: Vacant
- Preceded by: Emilio de los Santos (acting)
- Succeeded by: José Rafael Molina Ureña (acting)

Personal details
- Born: 9 June 1923 Santiago de los Caballeros, Dominican Republic
- Died: 22 July 2006 (aged 83) Santo Domingo, Dominican Republic
- Spouse: Clara Tejera Álvarez

Joseph Donald Reid Cabral (June 9, 1923 – July 22, 2006) was a Dominican politician and lawyer. Reid became president during the "triumvirate" from December 28, 1963 to April 25, 1965.

== Biography ==
Donald Reid Cabral was born in Santiago de los Caballeros, Dominican Republic. He was the son of William Reid, a Scottish immigrant from Perthshire who worked as a banker in Santo Domingo. His mother, Auristela Cabral Bermúdez, had come from a politically affluent family, and was a descendant of three ex-presidents of the Dominican Republic (Buenaventura Báez, José María Cabral and Marcos Antonio Cabral). Reid Cabral enrolled in the Universidad Autónoma de Santo Domingo where he studied Law.

Reid was married to Clara Tejera Álvarez, who served as first lady during his presidency.

== Politics ==
Donald Reid Cabral first served as an ambassador to the United Nations and Israel. He was part of the Council of State that formed in 1962 and 1963, after the overthrow of the regime of Rafael Leónidas Trujillo.

Reid also chaired the triumvirate which ruled the Dominican Republic following the overthrow of the constitutional government of Juan Bosch (1963–1965), and in that capacity he was the Secretary of Foreign Affairs and the Ministry of the Armed Forces. In 1965 a pro-Juan Bosch uprising occurred, which would ultimately lead to his overthrow, although the US tried to end it in the Operation Power Pack.

From 1986 to 1988 he acted as the nation's foreign minister. In the last stage of his life was closely linked to the Social Christian Reformist Party (PRSC), founded by Joaquín Balaguer.

== Business ==
In 1947, Donald Reid Cabral founded, along with Rogelio Pellerano, Reid & Pellerano Co., later Grupo ReidCo, a major automotive distributor in Dominican Republic.

== Ancestors ==
Ancestors of Donald Reid Cabral

8. William Reid (*1809)
4. Donald R. Reid (*1856)
9. Jannet Reid (*1814)
2. William Campbell Reid (*1887)
5. Anne McLean (*1858)
22. James McLean (*ca.1806)
11. Anne McLean (*ca.1843)
23. Margaret Campbell (*ca.1806)
1. Donald Joseph Reid Cabral
24. José María Cabral y Luna (1816–1899)
12. Marcos Antonio Cabral y Figueredo (1843–1903)
25. Agueda Figueredo Rivera (*1821)
6. José María Cabral y Báez (1864–1937)
26. Buenaventura Báez Méndez (1812–1884)
13. Altagracia Amelia Báez Andújar (†1879)
27. Férmina Andújar
3. Auristela Cabral Bermúdez (1901–1968)
28. Nicolás Bermúdez (*1798)
14. Erasmo Bermúdez Jiménez (1825–1907)
29. Bárbara Jiménez (*1802)
7. María Petronila Bermúdez Rochet (1872–1942). Siblings: José Armando Bermúdez Rochet, Aquiles Bermúdez Rochet, Auristela Bermúdez Rochet, Manuel María Bermúdez Rochet, Erasmo Ramón Bermúdez Rochet, Cristóbal Bermúdez Rochet.
30. Cristobal Rochet Sellier (Born as Christophe Rochette January 11, 1796). Siblings: Charles Rochette Sellier, Jean Rochette Sellier. Children of Antoine Joseph Rochette and Elizabeth Sellier Laurent.
15. María Petronila Rochet Gómez (1839–1889). Siblings: Juan Pablo Rochet Gómez, Cipriana Justina Rochet Gómez
31. Mauricia Gómez Pérez (1809–1889)
