= José María Cabral y Báez =

José María Cabral y Báez (1864–1937) was a lawyer, businessman, and politician from the Dominican Republic. He served as the President of Chamber of Deputies of the Dominican Republic in 1901.

== Early life and family ==
Cabral y Báez was born to President Marcos Antonio Cabral and Altagracia Amelia Báez (daughter of President Buenaventura Báez); he had 7 siblings, among them, Mario Fermín Cabral y Báez. On 17 November 1897, he married María Petronila Bermúdez y Rochet, daughter of Erasmo Bermúdez Jiménez, the founder of Bermúdez rum company; they had 6 children: Amelia María (1899–1996), Auristela (1901–1988), José María (1902–1984), Marco Antonio (1906–1973), Josefina Eugenia (1910–1994), and Pedro Pablo Cabral Bermúdez (1916–1988). He also begat 3 children with Estela Navarro: Mairení, José and Raúl Cabral Navarro; with Rafaela Meyreles he sired 2 children: Rafael and Enrique Meyreles.

Ancestors of José María Cabral y Báez

16. Marcos Cabral Valera (†1838); Hincha, Colony of Santo Domingo
8. Juan Marcos Cabral y Aybar (1792–1853); Hincha, Colony of Santo Domingo
17. María Aybar de Luna; Hincha, Colony of Santo Domingo
4. Melchor María Cabral y Luna (1815–?); Baní, Colony of Santo Domingo
18. Blas de Luna Aybar; Hincha, Colony of Santo Domingo
9. María Ramona de Luna y Andújar (1787–1877); Hincha, Colony of Santo Domingo
19. María Francisca de Andújar Santana; Hincha, Colony of Santo Domingo
2. Marcos Ezequiel Antonio Cabral y Figueredo (1842-1903); Baní, Ozama Department, Haiti
20. Domingo Figueredo Pérez (†1809); Bánica, Colony of Santo Domingo
10. Gervasio Figueredo Lamsar; Bánica, Colony of Santo Domingo
21. Margarita Lamsar Montás; Cap-Français, Colony of Saint Domingue
5. Águeda Figueredo Rivera (1821–1877)
22. Fernando Rivera Andújar; Bánica, Colony of Santo Domingo
11. Micaela Rivera Figueredo; Hincha, Colony of Santo Domingo
23. Juliana Figueredo Pérez (†1817); Bánica, Colony of Santo Domingo
1. José María Cabral y Báez (1864–1937); Baní, Dominican Republic
24. Antonio Sánchez de Valverde y Díaz de Ocaña (ca. 1730–ca. 1790); Bayaguana, Colony of Santo Domingo
12. Pablo Altagracia Báez (†1840); Azua, Colony of Santo Domingo
25. Mrs. Filpo; Spain
6. Ramón Buenaventura Báez Méndez (1812–1884); Cabral, Colony of Santo Domingo
13. Teresa de Jesús Méndez (ca. 1788–?); Cabral, Colony of Santo Domingo
3. Altagracia Amelia Báez Andújar (†1879)
28. Juan Evangelista de Andújar y Valera; Hincha, Colony of Santo Domingo
14. Juan Pablo Andújar de Soto (1776–1847); Hincha, Colony of Santo Domingo
29. María Francisca de Soto Franco; Hincha, Colony of Santo Domingo
7. María Fermina Andújar Soto-Franco; Hincha, Colony of Santo Domingo
30. Manuel de Soto Franco; Hincha, Colony of Santo Domingo
15. María Francisca de Soto Fernández; Hincha, Colony of Santo Domingo
31. Antonia Fernández Molina; Hincha, Colony of Santo Domingo

== Career ==
In 1886, he founded in Santiago the law firm J. M. Cabral y Báez. He was Minister of Foreign Affairs from July 1908 to November 1911, during the last half of Ramón Cáceres’s presidential term, and minister during the short presidency of Francisco Henríquez y Carvajal in 1916, before the American occupation of the Dominican Republic (1916–24).
