= Marcos Antonio Cabral =

Dominican politician and public speaker (1842–1903)

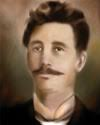

21st President of the Dominican Republic
- In office 10 December 1876 – 26 December 1876
- Preceded by: Ignacio María González
- Succeeded by: Buenaventura Báez

Personal details
- Born: 10 April 1842 Baní, Dominican Republic
- Died: 3 March 1903 (aged 60) Santo Domingo, Dominican Republic
- Children: 7
- Occupation: Politician, writer, speaker, and military commander

Marcos Ezequiel Antonio Cabral y Figueredo (10 April 1842 – 3 March 1903) was a Dominican military officer, renowned writer, speaker, and president of the Dominican Republic.

== Family ==
Born into a family whose lineage dates back to Portugal, Castile, and the Canary Islands. His great-great-grandfather Marcos Cabral Maldonado was mayor of Hincha around 1760. His father was Melchor María Cabral y Luna, and his mother Águeda Figueredo Rivera. He was the nephew of General Dionisio Cabral y Luna and the several-time president of the Dominican Republic José María Cabral. Cabral married his second-cousin Altagracia Amelia Báez Andújar, the daughter of President Buenaventura Báez, and begat 7 children: José María, Ramona Antonia, Casilda, Pablo, Buenaventura, Mario Fermín, and Altagracia Amelia Cabral y Báez.

== Provisional Presidency ==
During th Dominican Restoration War, Cabral Figurredo was personal secretary of General Pedro Florentino. He was there in September 1863, when he rose up against the Spain occupation in Baní. Due to his militancy, he fell under the control of General Domingo Lazala, who had condemned the patrician Francisco del Rosario Sánchez to death some several years prior in 1861. His time as head of state was brief. He took office as President of the Provisional Government Board on 10 December 1876, replacing President Ignacio María González, who renounced power. At the same time, Cabral Figueredo transferred command of the country on 27 December 1876 to his father-in-law Buenaventura Báez.

== Death ==
Cabral Figueredo died on 3 March 1903 in Santo Domingo after giving a fiery speech at Puerta del Conde.

== See also ==
- Buenaventura Báez
- José María Cabral
- Ignacio María González

== Ancestry ==
Ancestors of Marcos Antonio Cabral

32. Miguel Baltasar Cabral de Torres
16. Marcos Cabral Maldonado
33. Leonor Gregoria Maldonado de Heredia
8. Marcos Cabral Valera (†1838); Hincha, Colony of Santo Domingo
34. Juan de Valera y Sotomayor (c. 1688–1760; brother of #45)
17. Magdalena de Valera de los Reyes
35. María Josefa de los Reyes Jiménez
4. Juan Marcos Cabral y Aybar (1792–1853); Hincha, Colony of Santo Domingo
18. Manuel de Aybar
9. María Aybar de Luna; Hincha, Colony of Santo Domingo
19. Petrona de Luna y Andújar
2. Melchor María Cabral y Luna (1815–?); Baní, Colony of Santo Domingo
40. Blas de Luna Guzmán
20. Manuel de Luna y Andújar
41. Gregoria de Andújar y Valera (sister of #22, daughter of #44 and #45)
10. Blas de Luna Franco; Hincha, Colony of Santo Domingo
42. José Franco
21. Juana Franco Santana
43. Juana Santana
5. María Ramona de Luna y Andújar (1787–1877); Hincha, Colony of Santo Domingo
44. Juan Diego de Andújar y Leguizamón
22. Juan Evangelista de Andújar y Valera (brother of #41); Hincha, Colony of Santo Domingo
45. Juana Andrea de Valera y Sotomayor (sister of #34)
11. María Francisca Andújar de Soto; Hincha, Colony of Santo Domingo
46. Miguel de Jesús de Soto Prado
23. María Francisca de Soto y Franco; Hincha, Colony of Santo Domingo
47. María Dionisia Franco Peguero (1701–1791)
1. Marcos Ezequiel Antonio Cabral y Figueredo (1842–1903); Bany, Ozama Department, Haiti
48. Francisco Javier Figueredo Luna (=60)
24. Domingo Figueredo Urdaneta (=30)
49. Antonia Urdaneta Rodríguez (=61)
12. Domingo Figueredo Pérez (†1809); Bánica, Colony of Santo Domingo
25. Úrsula Pérez y Pérez (=31)
6. Gervasio Figueredo Lamsar; Bánica, Colony of Santo Domingo
26. Gervasio Lamsar
13. Margarita Lamsar Montás; Cap-Français, Colony of Saint Domingue
27. María Montás
3. Águeda Figueredo Rivera (1821–1877)Baní, Colony of Santo Domingo
56. José Donato de Rivera
28. Manuel de Rivera Núñez
57. Felipa Núñez Chacón
14. Fernando Rivera Andújar; Bánica, Colony of Santo Domingo
58. Juan de Andújar y Guzmán (grandson of #44 and #45)
29. Juana Andújar Alcántara
59. María Merced de Alcántara y Sosa
7. Micaela Rivera Figueredo; Hincha, Colony of Santo Domingo
60. Francisco Javier Figueredo Luna (=48)
30. Domingo Figueredo Urdaneta (24)
61. Antonia Urdaneta Rodríguez (=49)
15. Juliana Figueredo Pérez (†1817); Bánica, Colony of Santo Domingo
31. Úrsula Pérez y Pérez (=25)

Political offices
Preceded by Ignacio María González	President of the Dominican Republic; 1876–1876	Succeeded by Buenaventura Báez
