= Manolo Tavárez Justo =

Dominican lawyer and revolutionary (1931–1963)

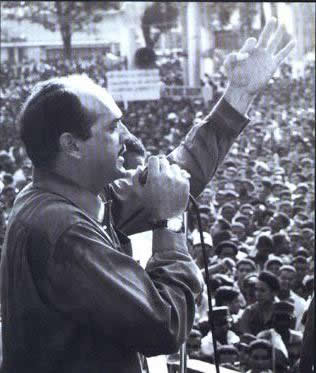
- Tavárez Justo speaking at the Parque Independencia, Santo Domingo, in 1963
- Born: Manuel Aurelio Tavárez Justo; 2 January 1931; Monte Cristi, Dominican Republic
- Died: 21 December 1963 (aged 32); Las Manaclas, San José de las Matas, Dominican Republic
- Cause of death: Gunshot wounds
- Education: Universidad Autónoma de Santo Domingo
- Occupations: Lawyer, political leader
- Political party: June 14 Movement
- Spouse: Minerva Mirabal (m. 1955; died 1960)
- Children: 2, including Minou Tavárez Mirabal

Manuel Aurelio "Manolo" Tavárez Justo (2 January 1931 – 21 December 1963) was a Dominican lawyer and political leader. He was the founding president of the June 14th Revolutionary Movement, the largest of the clandestine groups opposed to the dictatorship of Rafael Trujillo. In 1963, he commanded the movement's guerrilla rising against the civilian junta that had overthrown President Juan Bosch. He surrendered at Las Manaclas on 21 December 1963 on the strength of a public promise that the lives of the rebels would be respected, but was shot with a group of his companions.

Tavárez Justo was the husband of Minerva Mirabal, one of the three Mirabal sisters killed by the Servicio de Inteligencia Militar in 1960, and the father of the politician and human rights campaigner Minou Tavárez Mirabal. The killings at Las Manaclas broke the civilian front of the junta, and their leader became one of the reference figures of the constitutionalist cause that took up arms again in 1965.

== Early life and education ==
Tavárez Justo was born in Monte Cristi on 2 January 1931. His father, Manuel Francisco Tavárez Ramos, grew rice on medium-sized holdings in the Las Peñas section of the province, and his mother was Josefa Justo Rosseau. He attended the Escuela de Varones Número Uno, later renamed Honduras, for his primary education and part of his secondary schooling, and took his bachillerato in philosophy and letters at the Escuela Normal de Varones.

Friends of his youth recalled that his parents spoke often about the United States occupation of 1916, and that these accounts shaped his hostility to foreign interference. Working on the family's land also brought him into contact with the labourers his father employed, which he later described as the beginning of his political education. He studied law at the Universidad Autónoma de Santo Domingo and graduated as a doctor in law.

At the university he met Minerva Mirabal, a law student from Salcedo whose family had already clashed with the regime. They married on 30 November 1955 and had two children, Manuel Enrique and Minerva Josefina. Their courtship and their correspondence from prison were published in English in 2022, in an edition prepared by their daughter with an introduction and translation by Heather Hennes.

== Founding of the 14 June Movement ==
The organization took its name from the landing of Dominican exiles at Constanza, Maimón and Estero Hondo on 14 June 1959, an expedition against Trujillo that the army and air force crushed within days. The survivors' example drew young opponents of the regime into clandestine work. Delegates from the scattered cells met on 10 January 1960 at a rice farm in the municipality of Mao, in Valverde Province, to bring them under a single leadership. Tavárez Justo was elected president of the central committee, with Rafael Faxas Canto as secretary and Leandro Guzmán as treasurer. Membership was later estimated at about 6,000, drawn from students, professionals, seminarians, soldiers, peasants and workers.

The movement planned to kill Trujillo at a cattle fair in January 1960. The plot was betrayed and the Servicio de Inteligencia Militar (SIM) arrested members across the country. Tavárez Justo was held in the torture centre known as La 40 in Santo Domingo and then in the prison at Puerto Plata, where prisoners were beaten and subjected to electric shocks. While he was there, on 25 November 1960, Minerva and her sisters Patria and María Teresa were stopped on the mountain road back from a visit to their husbands and killed. Trujillo was assassinated on 30 May 1961, and an amnesty on 26 July 1961 released Tavárez Justo.

A general assembly on 30 July 1961 confirmed him as president of the organization, which now came into the open as the Agrupación Política 14 de Junio. It became one of the three largest political forces of the transition, alongside the Dominican Revolutionary Party and the National Civic Union, and took part in the demonstrations that forced the Trujillo family into exile that November.

== Political leader, 1961–1963 ==
Tavárez Justo campaigned across the country, and the movement refused to contest the elections of 20 December 1962, which it said offered no guarantees, calling instead for abstention. Juan Bosch of the Dominican Revolutionary Party won the presidency with close to 60 percent of the vote and took office in February 1963. He spoke at the Parque Independencia in Santo Domingo on 14 June 1962, and shortly before Bosch took office he announced that the 14 June group would support the new government's measures in favour of popular interests.

Relations with Bosch were uneasy. Tavárez Justo warned the president publicly that a coup was being prepared with the backing of the church, the business elite, the high command and the United States embassy. The government, he said, was turning its back on the poor. On 25 September 1963 the army overthrew Bosch. The three-man junta sworn in the next day was headed by Emilio de los Santos, with Manuel Tavárez Espaillat and Ramón Tapia Espinal as the other members. It annulled the constitution of 1963 and restored that of 1962, dissolved Congress and outlawed the organizations of the left.

At a rally at the Puerta del Conde on 14 June 1963, Tavárez Justo had warned that if peaceful struggle were blocked the movement knew where "the rugged mountains of Quisqueya" were. After the coup the 14J declared itself on 22 November the "standard-bearer of the return of the constitutional regime" and called for a constituent assembly to name a provisional president alongside the junta.

== Insurrection of 1963 ==
On the night of 28 November 1963 the movement rose in six fronts named after figures of the anti-Trujillo struggle: Juan de Dios Ventura Simó, Gregorio Luperón, Mauricio Báez, Hermanas Mirabal, Francisco del Rosario Sánchez and Enrique Jiménez Moya. (Note: Some Dominican accounts date the start of the rising to 21 or 26 November 1963.) Tavárez Justo was commander-in-chief and placed himself at the Jiménez Moya front at Las Manaclas, in the Cordillera Central above San José de las Matas. His proclamation to the country described the hour as calling for "the restoration and improvement of the constitutional regime abolished by the coup d'état".

The rising had been prepared in about two months. The guerrillas lacked training, boots and food, many of their weapons were unusable, and they found little support among the peasantry. The army bombed the mountains with P-51 Mustang aircraft, and on 3 December the junta outlawed the movement by decree. Within three weeks four of the six fronts had been destroyed.

The Manaclas front numbered 29 combatants, of whom eight survived. By 19 December the group was short of food and the stores laid in before the climb had been seized. On the night of 20 December most of the men voted to accept the guarantees Tavárez Espaillat had offered on radio and television: the lives and rights of guerrillas who laid down their arms would be respected. Tavárez Justo argued against surrender, but on the morning of 21 December he agreed to it, and five of his men who still refused were allowed to leave.

The rest walked down towards a road to give themselves up and were shot at Alto de la Diferencia. The government first said that Tavárez Justo had committed suicide and then that he had been killed in a gunfight, and announced that he and fourteen companions had died and been buried in a common grave. An official report by General Elby Viñas Román later listed seventeen dead. (Note: Time reported fifteen dead in January 1964, on the government's own communiqué. Dominican accounts give figures ranging from fifteen to twenty-nine for the whole rising.) Surviving guerrillas said the men had been shot after surrendering, some of them where they were captured. Among the dead was Antonio Barreiro, the 27-year-old godson of Emilio de los Santos. Tavárez Justo was 32.

== Aftermath ==
The executions destroyed the junta's claim to civilian legitimacy. De los Santos resigned on 22 December, and the collapse of the coalition opened the way for Donald Reid Cabral, who took over the government in 1964. Washington had held back from recognizing the junta while John F. Kennedy was alive. Recognition came in December 1963, after his assassination. The 14J, weakened but not destroyed, fought on the constitutionalist side in the Dominican Civil War of April 1965 and dissolved in 1968.

His daughter Minou described the killings as a "state crime" for which no one was ever brought to justice. In December 2013, on the fiftieth anniversary, the Federación de Fundaciones Patrióticas and Minou Tavárez Mirabal lodged a complaint against the former secretary of the armed forces, Ramiro Matos González, and the officers and enlisted men under his command. They accused them of war crimes and sought 50 million pesos in compensation.

== Legacy ==
The dead of Las Manaclas were first buried where they fell. On 25 November 2000 the remains of Tavárez Justo and of the three Mirabal sisters were moved from the municipal cemetery of Salcedo to a mausoleum in the garden of the family home, by then the Casa Museo Hermanas Mirabal. The mausoleum was declared an extension of the National Pantheon.

His speeches were collected as Discursos políticos (1961–1963) in 2006, and the Academy of Dominican History marked the fiftieth anniversary of his death with a volume of studies that included a survey of the 1963 fronts by Roberto Cassá. The English edition of the letters carries a foreword by Michelle Bachelet. In June 2012 the corner of West 181st Street and St. Nicholas Avenue in the Dominican neighbourhood of Washington Heights in New York was co-named "Manolo Tavárez Justo Way".
