= June 14th Revolutionary Movement =

Dominican left-wing revolutionary organization (1960–1968)

June 14th Revolutionary Movement Movimiento Revolucionario 14 de Junio
- Flag of the 14J
- Abbreviation: 14J, 1J4
- Founder: Manolo Tavárez Justo, Minerva Mirabal
- Founded: 10 January 1960
- Dissolved: 1968
- Headquarters: Santo Domingo, Dominican Republic
- Ideology: Left-wing nationalism, anti-imperialism, opposition to the Trujillo dictatorship
- Political position: Left-wing to far-left

The June 14th Revolutionary Movement (Spanish: Movimiento Revolucionario 14 de Junio), also known as the 14th of June Movement and abbreviated 14J or 1J4, was a Dominican left-wing organization founded in January 1960 to overthrow the dictatorship of Rafael Trujillo. It took its name from the landing of Dominican exiles at Constanza, Maimón and Estero Hondo on 14 June 1959, and adopted the exiles' minimum program as its own.

The movement was the largest of the clandestine groups opposing Trujillo. After a plot to kill the dictator at a cattle fair was uncovered in January 1960, its members were arrested and tortured, among them the Mirabal sisters, three of whom were murdered in November 1960. The organization came into the open as a political party after Trujillo's assassination in 1961, refused to contest the 1962 elections, and took up arms in November 1963 against the civilian junta that had overthrown President Juan Bosch. Its leader, Manolo Tavárez Justo, was captured and executed in December 1963. The movement fought on the constitutionalist side in the Dominican Civil War of 1965 and dissolved in 1968.

== Background ==
Trujillo governed the Dominican Republic from 1930 until his assassination in 1961, and opposition activity was confined to small clandestine cells watched by the Servicio de Inteligencia Militar (SIM). On 14 June 1959, some 150 Dominican exiles belonging to the Dominican Liberation Movement (Movimiento de Liberación Dominicana, MLD) landed at Constanza, Maimón and Estero Hondo, in the north of the country, under Enrique Jiménez Moya. They had trained in Cuba with the support of Fidel Castro, whose Cuban Revolution had triumphed on 1 January 1959. The landing was crushed within days by the Dominican army and air force, and only a handful of the expeditionaries survived. Their dead were commemorated as la Raza Inmortal ("the immortal race"), and the date of the landing became the reference point for the internal resistance that followed.

== Foundation ==
Delegates of the resistance cells met on 10 January 1960 at a rice farm belonging to Carlos Conrado Bogaert Domínguez in Boca de Mao, in the Laguna Salada district of Valverde Province, to give the scattered groups a single organization. According to the notarized record of the founding meeting, the name was proposed by Minerva Mirabal, seconded by Dulce Tejada de Álvarez, and adopted unanimously: "From today, 10 January 1960, the cellular movement that has been organizing clandestinely at national level shall take the name of Movimiento Revolucionario 14 de Junio". The first article of the movement's decalogue adopted the minimum program of the 1959 expeditionaries.

The lawyer Manolo Tavárez Justo, husband of Minerva Mirabal, was elected president. Rafael Miguel "Pipe" Faxas Canto served as general secretary and Leandro Guzmán as treasurer. The founding group included the three activist Mirabal sisters, Patria, Minerva and María Teresa, and their husbands, as well as students, professionals, seminarians, workers and peasants from across the country. The historian Roberto Cassá, who dates the formal constitution of the movement to this meeting, described it as the most significant revolutionary organization in the history of the Dominican republic; its membership was later put at about 6,000.

== Repression ==
In January 1960 the movement planned to assassinate Trujillo at a cattle fair. The plot was discovered before it could be carried out, and the SIM arrested members across the country. Prisoners were taken to the torture centers at La 40 and at kilometer 9 of the Mella highway, where they were beaten and subjected to electric shocks. Tavárez Justo was held in La 40 and then transferred to the prison in Puerto Plata; Patria Mirabal's house, where the group had met, was burned.

Minerva and María Teresa Mirabal were released, but their husbands remained in prison in Puerto Plata, and the sisters had to travel there over the mountain road from Salcedo. On 25 November 1960 the three sisters and their driver, Rufino de la Cruz, were stopped on that road and killed by agents of the SIM. The murders, ordered by Trujillo, discredited the regime at home and abroad; Trujillo was himself assassinated on 30 May 1961.

== Political party ==
On 8 July 1960 the movement announced that it was coming into the open and organizing as a party, and a constituent assembly with delegates from every province was held that month. After the fall of the Trujillo family, an amnesty on 26 July 1961 freed Tavárez Justo, and the organization took the name June 14 Political Group (Agrupación Política 14 de Junio). It became, with the Dominican Revolutionary Party and the National Civic Union, one of the three largest political forces of the transition, and took part in the mobilizations that forced the Trujillo family into exile.

The movement declined to contest the elections of 20 December 1962, which it considered to offer no real guarantees, and called on its supporters to abstain; other groups of the left, including the Popular Socialist Party and the Dominican Popular Movement, did the same. Juan Bosch of the Dominican Revolutionary Party won the presidency with close to 60 percent of the vote and took office in February 1963.

Relations between Bosch and the movement were uneasy. Tavárez Justo publicly warned the new president that a coup was being prepared with the backing of the church, the business elite, the high command, and the United States embassy, and criticized what he called the government's turn away from the people. On 25 September 1963 the army overthrew Bosch and installed a three-man civilian junta headed by Emilio de los Santos.

== Insurrection of 1963 ==
The junta annulled the 1963 constitution, dissolved Congress and outlawed the parties of the left. The 14J declared itself "standard-bearer of the return of the constitutional regime" in a communiqué on 22 November and, on the night of 28 November 1963, rose in arms in six guerrilla fronts named after Dominican and foreign figures of the anti-Trujillo struggle: Juan de Dios Ventura Simó, Gregorio Luperón, Mauricio Báez, Hermanas Mirabal, Francisco del Rosario Sánchez and Enrique Jiménez Moya. Tavárez Justo was commander-in-chief and placed himself at the Jiménez Moya front, in Las Manaclas, in the mountains of San José de las Matas.

The insurrection had been prepared in about two months. The guerrillas lacked training, boots and food, many of their weapons were unusable, and they found little support among the peasantry; the army bombed the mountains with P-51 Mustang aircraft, and on 3 December the junta outlawed the movement by decree. Within three weeks four of the six fronts had been destroyed. On 21 December, at a place called Alto de la Diferencia, Tavárez Justo and a group of his men surrendered after receiving assurances that their lives would be respected, and were shot. The government first described his death as a suicide and then as a death in combat; the bodies were buried in a common grave. Estimates of the total dead range from fifteen to twenty-nine.

The executions broke the junta's civilian facade. De los Santos resigned in protest on 22 December, and the breakdown of the coalition opened the way for Donald Reid Cabral, who took over the government in 1964.

== Civil war and dissolution ==
The movement was weakened but not destroyed by the death of its leader. When part of the army rose against Reid Cabral on 24 April 1965, opening the Dominican Civil War, its provisional central committee decided to join the constitutionalist side, and its members formed many of the armed comandos that fought in Santo Domingo alongside the Dominican Revolutionary Party, the Popular Socialist Party and the Dominican Popular Movement. The extent of communist or Castroite influence among the constitutionalists, and within the 14J in particular, was disputed at the time and has been since. In October 1965, after the ceasefire, its headquarters in Santo Domingo was one of the positions stormed by the army in an operation against armed groups that had refused to disarm.

With its leader dead, its cadres imprisoned or exiled, and its role in the April revolution questioned by its own members, the movement went into crisis after 1965 and dissolved in 1968.
