= Triumvirate (disambiguation) =

Triumvirate, synonym for triarchy, is a political regime ruled or dominated by three powerful individuals. It can refer to the following specific triumvirates:

- Triumvirate (ancient Rome)
  - First Triumvirate
  - Second Triumvirate
- First Triumvirate (Argentina)
  - Second Triumvirate (Argentina)
- Mino Triumvirate, Sengoku Period Japan
- Great Triumvirate, 19th century United States
- Bourbon Triumvirate, Georgia, United States
- Red Triumvirate, Papal States
- Maupeou Triumvirate, Ancien Régime France
- Triumvirate of 1813, Netherlands
- Triumvirate of 1963, Dominican Republic
  - Second Triumvirate (Dominican Republic)

Other meanings

- Triumvirate (Mike Bloomfield, John P. Hammond, and Dr. John album), 1973
- Triumvirate (Carter Tutti Void album), 2019
- Triumvirate (ship)
- Triumvirate Environmental, company in the United States
- Triumvirate Glacier, in the Tordrillo Mountains, Alaska, United States
- Great Triumvirate (golf)
- The Triumvirate Assuming Power, an 1828 painting by Jan Willem Pieneman

== See also ==
- Triumvirat, German rock band
- Triarchy (disambiguation)
