= Triumvirate of 1963 =

- El Triunvirato de 1963

President of the Dominican Republic
- In office 26 September 1963 – 27 June 1964
- Leader: Emilio de los Santos Manuel Enrique Tavares Espaillat Ramón Tapia Espinal
- Preceded by: Provisional Government Junta
- Succeeded by: Second Triumvirate

The Triumvirate of 1963 was a short-lived three man civilian junta that controlled the Dominican Republic after the 1963 Dominican Coup d'état. After deposing the democratically elected president Juan Bosch the military established a three-man military junta headed by General Imbert Barrera, Luis Amiamo Tio & Victor Elby Vinas Roman but was forced to create the civilian junta after international & domestic pressure.

The civilian junta was led by Emilio de Los Santos, Manuel Enrique Tavares Espaillat, & Ramon Tapia Espinal, who had been chosen after six right leaning parties were called to assist in the formation of a provisional government.

The junta continued to face domestic resistance leading to all of the civilian junta leaders to eventually step down(The last member to leave was Espaillat on June 27, 1964) leading to Donald Joseph Reid Cabral becoming the temporary minister of the armed forces & national police making him the de facto leader of the country. Austerity reforms & the firing of military personnel not loyal to Reid would lead to a military rebellion on 24 April 1965 that demanded Bosch's restoration.

== See also ==
- Juan Bosch
- 1963 Dominican coup d'état
- Provisional Government Junta
- The Second Triumvirate
- Dominican Civil War
