= Dominican Provisional Government Junta =

Dominican military junta

Provisional Government Junta
- El Gobierno Provisional Junta

President of the Dominican Republic
- In office 25 September 1963 – 26 September 1963
- Leader: Antonio Imbert Barrera Luis Amiamo Tio Victor Elby Vinas Roman
- Preceded by: Juan Bosch
- Succeeded by: Triumvirate of 1963

The Dominican Provisional Government Junta was a day-long military junta established after the coup that overthrew the democratically elected Juan Bosch on September 25, 1963. Headed by General Imbert Barrera, Luis Amiamo Tio, & Victor Elby Vinas Roman it called the leader of 6 right-leaning parties to come together and help form government in the wake of the coup leading to the Triumvirate of 1963.

== See also ==
- Juan Bosch
- 1963 Dominican coup d'état
- Triumvirate of 1963
- 1965 Dominican Civil War
