= 1963 Dominican coup d'état =

1963 coup in the Dominican Republic

1963 Dominican Coup d'état
- Date: September 25, 1963
- Location: Santo Domingo, Dominican Republic
- Participants: Dominican Army; Elias Wessin y Wessin; Antonio Imbert Barrera; Luis Amiamo Tio; Victor Elby Vinas Roman; Government of Dominican Republic; Juan Bosch
- Outcome: Juan Bosch is deposed and exiled; Democratic rule is overturned; Military junta assumes power

The 1963 Dominican coup d'état was a coup d'état that took place on 25 September 1963 against President Juan Bosch in the Dominican Republic. Juan Bosch had been the first democratically elected president after the assassination of the former dictator Rafael Trujillo, but he faced criticism due to his policies, which were seen as leftist. This led to a coup that replaced his government with a military junta; which itself would be replaced with a civilian junta.

== Background ==
The Dominican Republic had been de facto led by dictator Rafael Trujillo since 1932 but post-World War 2 his government came under scrutiny from foreign governments due to human rights violations, and internal strife began to grow, with one attempt to overthrow him by communist Dominican expatriates trained in Cuba on June 14, 1959. This attempted invasion led to mass arrests which were condemned by the catholic clergy within the country.

In 1956, Dr. Jesus Maria de Galindez, a Dominican expatriate and critic of the Trujillo regime, disappeared from New York City. Galindez had been flown to the Dominican Republic by an American pilot and a Dominican pilot named Octavio de la Maza; The American pilot would die and Maza was accused of Galindez's murder and died from unknown causes (Evidence pointed to murder or suicide). His brother, who was a part of Trujillo's inner circle, would be complicit in Trujillo's assassination.

One of the fiercest critics of the regime was Venezuelan president Rómulo Betancourt, which led Trujillo to try and kill him in a failed assassination attempt. As a result of the assassination attempt, multiple countries began suspending diplomatic ties including the United States which had planned to include the country in Alliance for Progress, a financial program which would have allocated development funds for the Dominican Republic.

On May 31, 1961, a group of conspirators led by the brother of Octavio de la Maza, Antonio de la Maza, killed Trujillo while he was on route to his mistress. The assassination was successful, but Trujillo's son Ramfis was able to seize power and proceeded to begin a reign of terror, executing and arresting any possible enemies of the regime. Ramfis and the remaining Trujillo family would be forced to leave the country for Francoist Spain, leaving the country under the control of the former vice president under the Trujillo regime, Joaquín Balaguer. However demonstrations against Balaguer led him to create a 7-man council that would run the country until new elections were held; He resigned on January 16 after riots against his rule happened yesterday. A coup by the army led to a 3-man military junta but a counter-coup by young air officers ousted the junta and elections were announced to held in December 1962, with Bosch winning.

=== Opposition to Bosch ===
From the beginning of his campaign, Bosch faced criticism that accused him of being a communist, specifically a Marxist–Leninist in the same vein as Castro, with increasing criticism from the catholic clergy, business elites, and other conservatives. The final nail in the coffin were disagreements with the military, which led to the coup.

A general strike started on September 20, 1963, after a call to strike by right-wing parties.

== Coup ==
On September 25, after only seven months in power, Bosch was overthrown and placed under arrest. The bloodless coup was led by Elias Wessin y Wessin, General Antonio Imbert Barrera, and other military leaders who accused Bosch and his cabinet of being "corrupt and pro-Communist", replacing them with a three-man military junta. Bosch was initially deported to Guadeloupe by ship but flew to Puerto Rico on October 1, where he spent the remainder of his exile.

The junta declared a nationwide state of siege, put a curfew in place, dissolved the legislature and deemed the new Constitution, which Bosch signed to deal with border clashes along the Haitian border, "non-existent", reverting to the 1962 constitution. The leaders of six right-leaning parties were called to assist in the formation of a provisional government which would lead to the creation of 3-man civilian junta headed by Emilio de Los Santos, Manuel Enrique Tavares Espaillat, and Ramón Tapia Espinal.

=== Domestic resistance to the coup ===
Both juntas faced resistance from the Dominican public in the form of protests, political and armed resistance.

After the junta seized control, both houses of the former legislature met in secret and held a unanimous vote to demand a return to constitutional rule. Independent Front for Constitutional Rehabilitation, an organization of lawyers, proposed Congress meet as a national assembly to appoint the Senate president as head of caretaker government and to hold elections in 6 months. 100 congress members would later meet and make former Senate president Juan Casasnovas Garrido provisional head of state, but Garrido was arrested on November 1, 1963, and exiled to Puerto Rico.

The day after the junta was sworn in, students who supported the socialist June 14 movement (Named after the invasion that happened on June 14, 1959) held a protest. By September 27, 700 people had been arrested. On October 7, 2000 university students protested the junta in Santo Domingo. On October 15, a 50 car motorcade in Santo Domingo had to be dispersed by the military. 20 people were injured and 800 arrested from a taxi/bus strike that happened on May 2, and anti-government protests on May 3. The strike would end on May 8, after it was declared illegal by the junta, who declared that strikers would face potential jail time.

On November 30, rebels attacked military personnel. On December 20, 17 rebels were killed, including the leader of the June 14 movement, Manuel Tavares Justo. Armed resistance including remnants of the June 14 movement were accused of blowing up ammo depots by the military. One ammo dump explosion that occurred across the Azuma river from Santo Domingo on June 11, 1964, left 10 dead and 110 injured, leading to the arrest of 14 persons including 4 army personnel.

== International reactions ==
United States condemned the coup, suspending aid to the country, refusing to recognize the military junta, and suspending diplomatic ties on the day of the coup along with Venezuela. Bolivia suspended their ties the next day. The embassies of Mexico, Bolivia, Costa Rica, and Venezuela provided refuge to members of the junta's opposition.

Spain, Portugal, Taiwan, and Honduras recognized the junta as the official Dominican government. By October 2, United Kingdom recognized them, and by October 31, France, West Germany, and Italy recognized the junta as the official government.

After the civilian junta announced a plan for democratic reform and scheduled elections, the US extended diplomatic recognition on December 14.

== Aftermath ==
Brutal repression tactics would lead the original members of the junta to step down (De Los Santos on December 22, 1963, Ramon on April 8, 1964, and Espaillat on June 27, 1964) leading to Donald Joseph Reid Cabral becoming the temporary minister of the armed forces and national police making him the de facto leader of the country. Austerity reforms and the firing of military personnel not loyal to Reid would lead to another military rebellion on April 24, 1965 that demanded Bosch's restoration.

The insurgents, commanded by Colonel Francisco Caamaño, removed the junta from power on April 28. The United States dispatched 22,000 troops to the island in Operation Power Pack during the ensuing civil war, occupying Santo Domingo for several months while a provisional government was formed and elections were organized.

An interim government was formed and elections were scheduled for 1 July 1966. Bosch returned to the country and ran as his party's presidential candidate. However, he ran a somewhat muted campaign, fearing for his safety and believing he would be thrown out of office by the military again if he won. He was defeated by Joaquín Balaguer, who garnered 57% of the vote. The last American troops left in September 1966.

== See also ==
- Dominican Provisional Government Junta
- Triumvirate of 1963
- Second Triumvirate
- 1965 Dominican Civil War
