= Second Triumvirate (Dominican Republic) =

- El Segundo Triunvirato

President of the Dominican Republic
- In office 27 June 1964 – 3 September 1965
- Leader: Donald Reid Cabral; Ramon Caceres
- Preceded by: Triumvirate of 1963
- Succeeded by: Héctor García-Godoy

The Second Triumvirate was a short-lived military junta that controlled the Dominican Republic after the Triumvirate of 1963 created after the coup that overthrew Juan Bosch fell apart.

Brutal repression tactics by the military to eliminate rebels & suppress protests led the members of the 1963 civilian junta to step down. Emilio de los Santos on December 22, 1963, Ramón Tapia Espinal on April 8, 1964 & finally Enrique Tavares Espaillat on 27 June 1964.

Donald Joseph Reid Cabral became the temporary minister of the armed forces & national police making him the de facto leader of the country. Austerity reforms & the firing of military personnel not loyal to Reid would lead to a military rebellion on April 24, 1965, that demanded Bosch's restoration.

== See also ==
- Juan Bosch
- 1963 Dominican coup d'état
- 1965 Dominican Civil War
