= Agustina Rivas - Tina Bazuca =

Dominican revolutionary combatant

Agustina Rivas Ramos
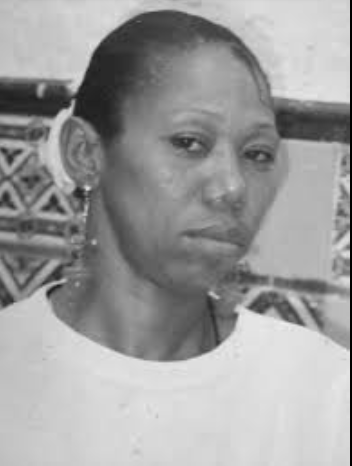
- Tina Bazuca during the 1965 Dominican Civil War
- Born: Agustina Rivas Ramos c. 1937; Dominican Republic
- Died: c. 1996
- Other name: Tina Bazuca
- Citizenship: Dominican Republic
- Occupation: Combatant
- Known for: Participation in the Dominican Civil War of 1965

Agustina Rivas Ramos, known as Tina Bazuca, was a Dominican combatant who participated in the 1965 Dominican Civil War. She was part of the constitutionalist forces during the conflict.

== Participation in the April War ==
The 1965 Dominican Civil War was a conflict aimed at defending national sovereignty and restoring constitutional order after President Juan Bosch was overthrown.

Sources indicate that Tina Bazuca took part in the conflict alongside other women and young people who joined armed groups. She was associated with the Poasi Command and participated in combat operations in areas of Santo Domingo, including Borojol, Guachupita, and locations near the Duarte Bridge.

Some sources attribute to her the use of weapons such as rifles and bazookas, which is believed to be the origin of her nickname.

== References and historical memory ==
Her figure has been mentioned in works related to the participation of women in the conflict. She is also referenced in the book Bazuca: The Forgotten Heroine by Darwin Núñez Veras, registered with ISBN 978-9945-9496-0-5, which presents a narrative based on her story within the context of the war.
