= Inter-American Peace Force =

Peacekeeping force in the Dominican Republic

- Fuerza Interamericana de Paz
- Seal of the IAPF
- Founded: 23 May 1965
- Disbanded: 1967

Leadership
- Commanding General: Hugo Panasco Alvim (1965–1966); Alvaro Alves da Silva Braga (1966–1967)
- Deputy Commanding General: Bruce Palmer Jr. (1965–1966); Robert R. Linvill (1966–1967)

Related articles
- History: Dominican Civil War

The Inter-American Peace Force (IAPF) (Spanish: Fuerza Interamericana de Paz, FIP) was a peacekeeping force in the Dominican Republic from several countries from the Americas that was formed towards the end of the Dominican Civil War. It was established by the Organization of American States (OAS) on 23 May 1965 following the United States' initial intervention in the war. Brazil later assumed command from the United States in 1966 and in 1967, the IAPF was ultimately disbanded.

== Background ==
The United States deployed armed forces to the Dominican Republic on 28 April 1965 following the outbreak of civil war. The OAS demanded a ceasefire on 29 April 1965 after being convened by the request of the United States.

== Creation ==
On 1 May 1965, the OAS responded to the rapid deterioration of stability during the Dominican Civil War, putting forth a proposal to create a peacekeeping force for the Americas. The OAS requested that Brazil to name a Commanding General for the force and the United States to decide a Deputy Commanding General; Brazil chose Hugo Panasco Alvim to head the operation while the United States named Bruce Palmer Jr. to be his deputy general. Colonel Julio Gutierrez of Nicaragua was chosen to be the chief of staff.

=== Mission ===
According to the 6 May 1965 resolution of the Organization of American States, the IAPF's mission was the following:

1. Cooperate in the restoration of peace in the Dominican Republic

2. Maintain the security of its inhabitants and the inviolability of human rights

3. Establish an atmosphere of peace and conciliation which would permit the functioning of democratic institutions

=== Act Establishing the IAPF ===
1. The Inter-American Force is hereby established as a force of the Organization of American States.

2. The inter-American Force shall consist of the Unified Command and the national contingents of member states assigned to it.

3. The Unified Command shall consist of the Commander of the Inter-American Force, the Deputy Commander and the staff.

4. The Commander of the Inter-American Force shall exercise operational control over all elements of the Force. He shall be responsible for the performance of all functions assigned to the Force by the OAS and for deployment and assignment of the units of the Force.

5. Members of the Force shall remain in their respective national services. During the period of assignment to the Force, they shall, however, serve under the authority of the OAS, and be subject to the instructions of the Commander through the chain of command. Command of all national contingents, less operational control, shall remain vested in the commanders of the respective national contingents

The act was signed by the Secretary-General of the OAS, Dr. José Antonio Mora as well as the commanders of Brazil, Costa Rica, Honduras, Nicaragua and the United States.

== Member states ==
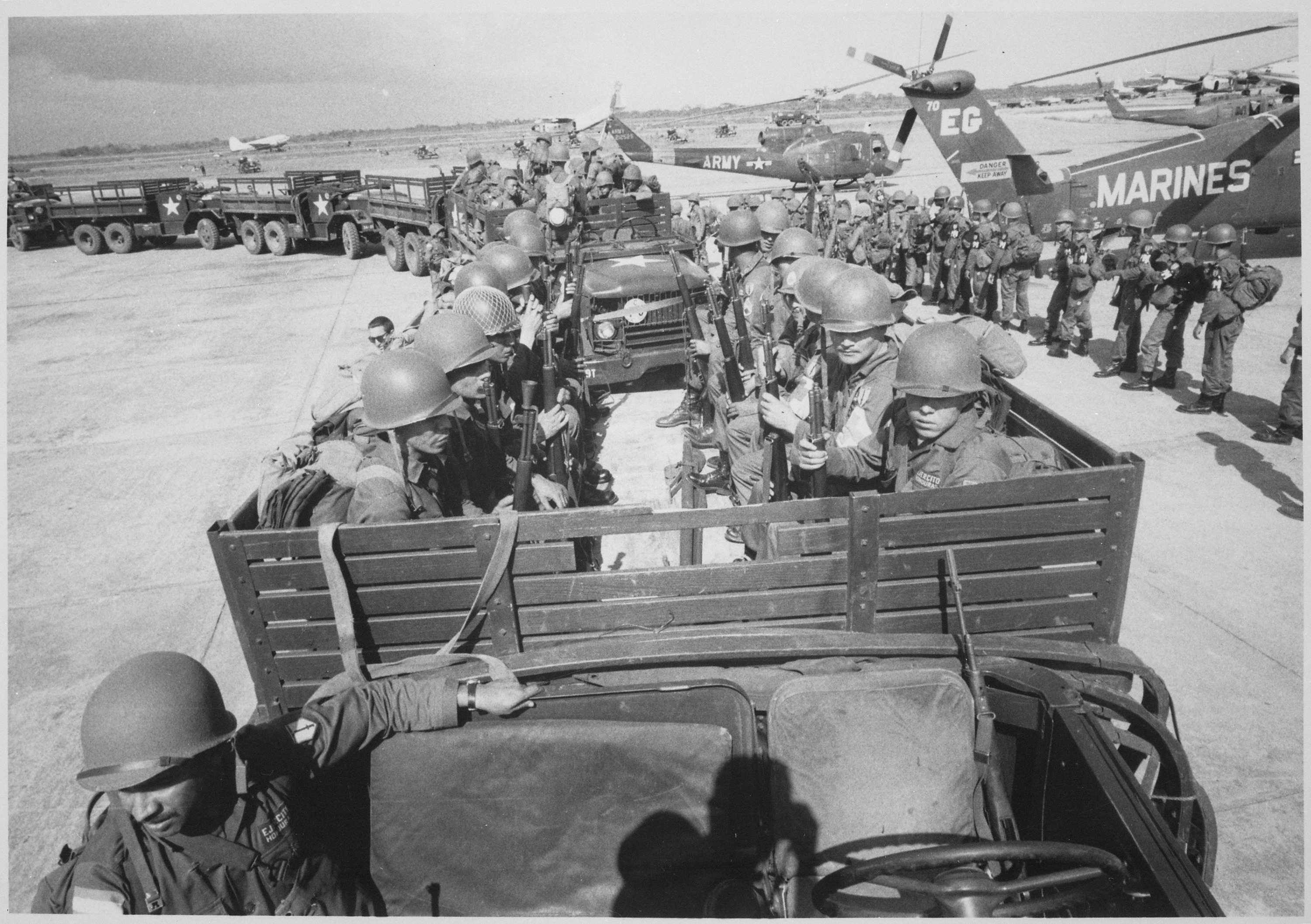
Honduran IAPF soldiers arrive in the Dominican Republic, 1965.

The following troops were sent by each country at their greatest numbers:

- United States – 42,600
- Brazil – 1,130
- Honduras – 250
- Paraguay – 184
- Nicaragua – 160
- Costa Rica – 21 military police
- El Salvador – 3 staff officers

== Actions ==
Upon arriving in the Dominican Republic in late-May 1965, IAPF troops were immediately tasked with securing the National Palace that had been plagued by shootings. The next task was securing key infrastructure areas, including the infamous Duarte Bridge, in order to restore normalcy to residents of the city. During the 1966 Dominican Republic general election, IAPF troops provided security for those voting. The peacekeeping force would later disband in 1967.

== Reactions ==
Vice President of the United States Hubert Humphrey stated "This extraordinary and heroic action, the creation of the Inter-American Peace Force, will live in the history of our world and our time. ... I look at this great force here – small in number but great in importance – as a symbol of peace and not of violence. You have helped to save lives, you have helped a nation to survive". Norman Thomas, then president of the Socialist Party of America speaking about the 1966 Dominican Republic general election that was maintained by IAPF troops, said "During the period of the voting the opinion of the observers with whom I spoke was that they were carried out very well. There was no violence nor obvious evidence of fraud during the process of depositing the votes. Our observers were treated cordially".

== See also ==
- United Nations peacekeeping
