= Sully Bonnelly =

Dominican fashion designer (born 1956)

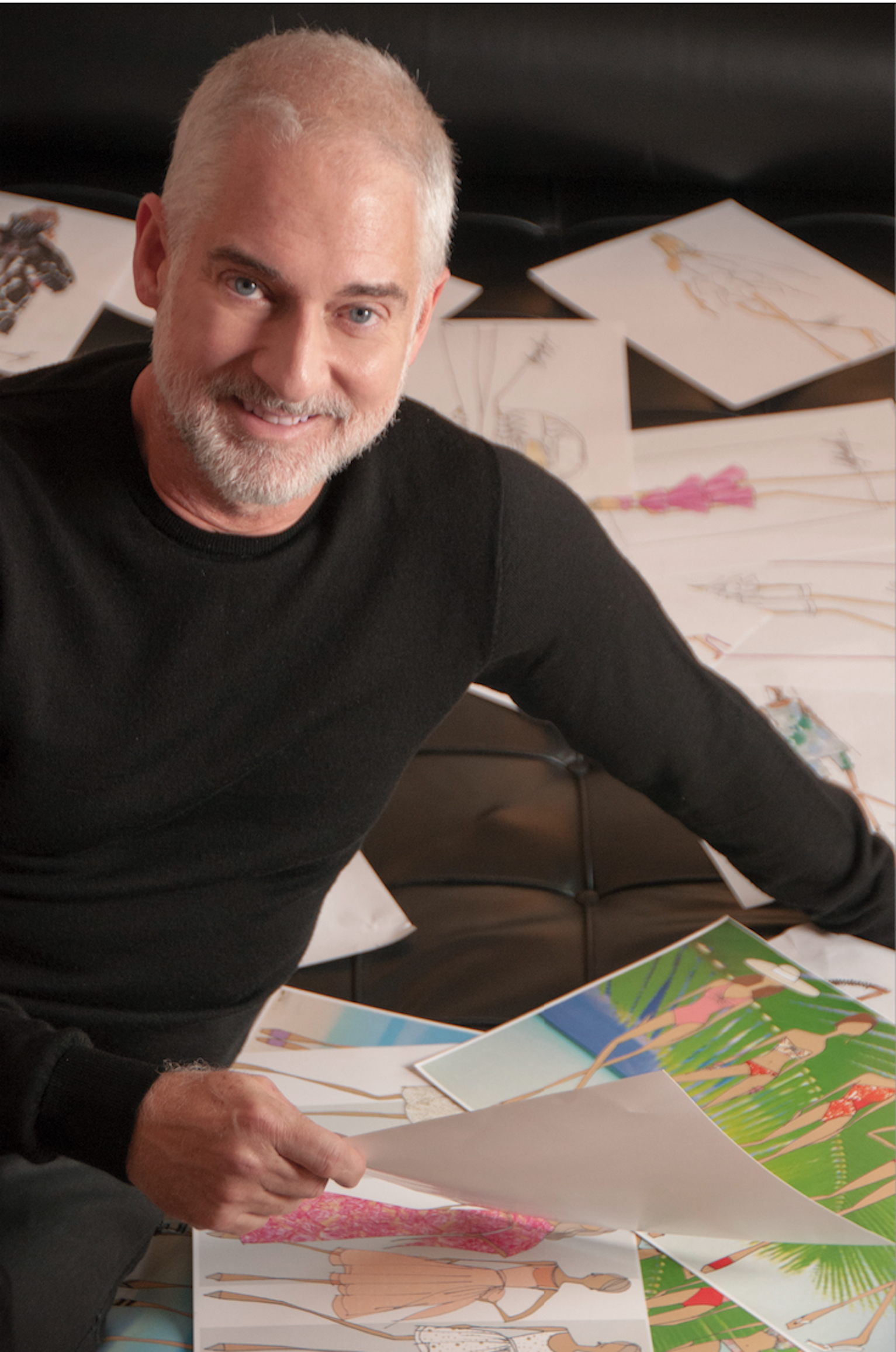
- Born: December 24, 1956 (age 69); Santo Domingo, Dominican Republic
- Education: Parson's School of Design, 1983
- Occupation: Fashion designer
- Label: Sully Bonnelly para Jumbo
- Spouse: Robert R. Littman
- Relatives: Rafael F. Bonnelly (uncle); Idelisa Bonnelly (third cousin-once removed)
- Awards: Golden Coast Award (Chicago 1999); The Governor's(George Pataki) Award of Excellence 2004; Dominicana Moda 2008; Order of Citizen Merit 2008; Dream Project 2013; Universidad Autonoma de Santo Domingo 2015
- Website: www.sullybonnelly.com

Sully Osvaldo de Jesús Bonnelly Canaán (born December 24, 1956) is a Dominican-American fashion designer of women's ready-to-wear. He is the founder, owner, and creative director of the brand Sully Bonnelly.

== Early years ==
Bonnelly was born into a family of both Corsican and French descent. An uncle of his, Rafael Bonnelly-Fondeur, became president of the Dominican Republic from 1962 to 1963. The oldest of five children and the only boy, he was born in Santo Domingo, Dominican Republic to Dominican parents, Carlos Sully Bonnelly Castellanos (father) and Esmira Josefina Canaán Díaz (mother). His sisters are Elizabeth Sikaffy, Sofia Durkee, Lilliam Bonnelly and Carolina Bonnelly. He also has a paternal half-brother: Carlos Sully Bonnelly Salazar. He graduated high school from Colegio Dominicano de la Salle

Bonnelly studied architecture at Universidad Autónoma de Santo Domingo, moved to New York in 1980 to study at Parsons School of Design where he graduated in 1983. Began his career in fashion as Oscar de la Renta's assistant. He also worked as a designer for the houses of Bill Blass, where he developed a line of "Evening Separates" for the "Bridge Market", and Eli Tahari before starting his first company Sully Bonnelly LTD in 1993, later called Sully Bonnelly International, sold through retailers such as Saks Fifth Avenue, Neiman Marcus, and Bergdorf Goodman. In 2006, he was named creative director for the O Oscar Collection.

== Career ==
In 2000, he launched Sully Bonnelly Accents, a collection for Home Shopping Network (HSN) and HSN en Espanol, becoming the first Latin American designer with a collection on a shopping network. In 2001, Bonnelly held the position as Creative Director for Citrine. Two years later, the Bonnelly Bridal collection was launched. In 1999 he received the Golden Coast Award, in Chicago. In 2001, Bonnelly was elected member to the Council of Fashion Designers of America (CFDA), an association of American fashion and accessory designers. He has been recognized by Dominican organizations for his contributions to fashion. In 2008, Bonnelly became the Creative Director for Muse, a contemporary women's clothing division of Maggy London in New York and Anthracite by Muse. Today, He works as creative director for Isaac Mizrahi Sportswear, Eveningwear, and Dresses.

=== Other notable accomplishments ===
In 2002, he designed Celia Cruz's dress for the Latin Grammy Awards. New York Governor George Pataki honored him in 2005 in celebration of Dominican Heritage Month. In 2018, Bonnelly received the Orden al Merito Ciudadano, an award recognizing Dominican nationals abroad for their professional achievements. Past honorees include the authors Junot Diaz and Julia Alvarez, the musician Michael Camilo and fashion designer Oscar de la Renta.

== Recognitions and awards ==
- 1999, 44th Annual Gold Coast Fashion Award, Designer of the Year.
- 2001, Was elected member to the Council of Fashion Designers of America, an important community of over 300 American fashion and accessory designers.
- 2001, Hostos Community College, For Outstanding Personal Achievement and Contribution to the Dominican Community in the USA.
- 2002, Quisqueya Life, In Appreciation for your Dedication to the Dominican Community.
- 2002, Ayuda for the Arts, Guiding Star Award.
- 2004, Certificate of Special Congressional Recognition - Charles B. Rangel, In Recognition of Outstanding and Invaluable Service to the Community.
- 2005, New York Governor George Pataki acknowledgement during Dominican Heritage Month.
- 2006, Dominican Times Magazine DTM, Latino Trendsetters AWARD.
- 2008, Dominicana Moda 2008 DM08, For Outstanding International Career.
- 2008, The Consulate General of the Dominican Republic of Citizen Merit, Orden al Merito Ciudadano, an award given to Dominicans all over the world who have distinguished themselves through their careers and represented honor to their homeland.
- 2011, Presidency of the Dominican Republic, Outstanding Dominican Who Honors the Dominican Republic Abroad
- 2013, Dream Project, Outstanding Dominican.
- 2013, Dominican Board for Dance, Recognition for contributions to the "Las Noches" Gala ...
- 2013, New York City Council "City Council Citation".
- 2013, Dominicana Moda 2013 DM13, Sully Bonnelly Para-Jumbo, "Best Collection with Mass Distribution".
- 2015, UASD Universidad Autónoma de Santo Domingo, Recognition for his significant contributions to the development of the Industrial Design and Fashion career.
- 2019, Ministry of Foreign Affairs of the Dominican Republic, Mr. Oscar de la Renta" Award to the Dominican Emigrant ".
- 2020, New York Dominican Parade, Leadership in the Fashion Industry.
- 2021, Quisqueya es Moda, In Recognition for his work in Fashion.
- 2022, Congress of the United States House of Representatives, “In Celebration and Recognition of his Career in Fashion” presented by Adriano Espaillat.

== Personal life ==
In January 2012, Sully Bonnelly married Robert Littman, president of the Vergel Foundation, an art foundation based in New York and Cuernavaca, Mexico.

Bonnelly's house was featured in Rima Suqi's book Fashion Designers At Home.

== See also ==
- List of fashion designers
