= Carmen Quidiello =

Cuban-born Dominican poet, playwright, and social activist (1915–2020)

First Lady of the Dominican Republic
- In office February 27, 1963 – September 25, 1963
- President: Juan Bosch
- Preceded by: Aida Mercedes Batlle
- Succeeded by: Military Triumvirate

Personal details
- Born: Carmen Quidiello Castillo; April 29, 1915 Santiago de Cuba, Cuba
- Died: December 19, 2020 (aged 105) Santo Domingo, Dominican Republic
- Spouse: Juan Bosch (m. 1943–2001; his death)
- Children: Barbara; Patricio
- Education: University of Havana
- Profession: Poet; Playwright

Carmen Quidiello Castillo (April 29, 1915 – December 19, 2020) was a Cuban-born Dominican poet, playwright and social activist. Quidiello served as First Lady of the Dominican Republic in 1963 during the short tenure of her husband, former President and Dominican Liberation Party (PLD) founder, Juan Bosch.

== Biography ==
=== Early life ===
Quidiello was born on April 29, 1915, in Santiago de Cuba. She attended primary school at the Colegio Teresiano de Barcelona in Barcelona, Spain, and graduated from the Instituto de Segunda Enseñanza in her hometown of Santiago de Cuba. She later received her bachelor's degree in social sciences and philosophy from the University of Havana. Quidiello later completed a postgraduate degree in diplomatic law from the University of Havana as well.

Quidiello met her future husband, Juan Bosch, in Matanzas, Cuba, in 1941. The couple married in 1943; Bosch and Quidiello had two children, Patricio and Bárbara, in addition to Bosch's two other children from his previous marriage.

=== Career ===
Quidiello supported the efforts of her husband and other Dominican exiles to remove the Rafael Trujillo dictatorship from power from the 1940s to the 1960s. Both lived in exile during much of this time.

Carmen Quidiello assumed the role of First Lady when her husband became president in February 1963. She focused on the arts and children's issues during her brief tenure. Under Quidiello sponsorship, the National Symphony Orchestra performed in the gardens of the National Palace for the first time in its history. She also created a new children's institute and inivited Spanish cellist Pablo Casals to perform in the Dominican Republic. President Bosch was ousted by a military coup in September 1963. Quidiello campaigned in support of her husband during the rest of his political, social justice, and literary careers over the next several decades. Juan Bosch died in November 2001.

Quidiello contributed numerous poems, plays and essays to the literature of the Dominican Republic. Some of her best known works included the play "La eterna Eva y el Insoportable Adán" (The Eternal Eve and the Unbearable Adam) and prose entitled "Pajaritas de Papel" (Paper Birds). Other works and poetry penned by Quidiello include "Desde mi orilla", "Decires poéticos", “El Peregrino o la Capa Tornasolada", and "Alguien espera junto al puente."

She co-founded the Auditorium Cultural Society (la Sociedad Cultural Auditorium) in 1972. She also participated in the International Festival of Theater of Havana. In 1998, Quidiello co-founded the Juan Bosch Foundation, which was tasked with preserving the political and economic ideas of her husband. She served as the foundation's president from 1998 until 2016 and remained its honorary president until her death in 2020.

Quidiello condemned the 2009 Honduran coup d'état, citing parallels she saw between events in Honduras and the 1963 ouster of Bosch in the Dominican Republic. She also called for peace in Venezuela as the political and economic situation deteriorated in that country.

Carmen Quidiello died of natural causes at the age of 105 at her residence on Calle Paseo de Los Locutores in Santo Domingo on December 19, 2020. President Luis Abinader declared December 21, 2020, as a national day of mourning and ordered that flags be flown at half-staff in Quidiello's honor.
