= Triarchy (disambiguation) =

Triarchy, synonym for triumvirate, is a political regime ruled or dominated by three powerful individuals.

Triarchy may also refer to:

- Triarchy (theory), a proposition that there are three fundamental ways of getting things done in organisations: hierarchy, heterarchy and responsible autonomy
- Triarchy of Negroponte, a crusader state established on the island of Euboea

== See also ==
- Triarchy of the Lost Lovers, an album by Rotting Christ
- Triarchic theory of intelligence
- Triumvirate (disambiguation)
