= Ramón Tapia Espinal =

Ramón Tapia Espinal (March 29, 1926 – March 24, 2002) was a lawyer and political figure from the Dominican Republic. He served as Secretary of Industry and Commerce and Secretary of State, for President, Rafael Bonnelly, during the Council of State (1961-1963) which succeeded the overthrow of the dictator Rafael Leónidas Trujillo in 1961.

Espinal was born in La Vega Province. After his time in Bonnelly's government, he served as a member of the triumvirate, a three-man civilian executive committee, established by the military after the overthrow of President Juan Bosch in 1963; originally with Emilio de los Santos and Manuel Enrique Tavares Espaillat, and later with Donald Reid Cabral and Espaillat. He resigned from the triumvirate in 1964 and was succeeded by Ramón Cáceres Troncoso.

In 1987 he was selected by President, Joaquín Balaguer, to represent the Dominican government in prosecuting ex-President, Salvador Jorge Blanco, on corruption charges. In 1988, Salvador Jorge Blanco was found guilty, in absentia, of corruption, sentenced to a 20 year prison sentence, and ordered, along with his associates, to pay fines totaling up to $17.3 million. The verdict marked the first time a Dominican head of state had been convicted of corruption.

In 1997 he was selected by Rumbo magazine as one of the 25 most powerful and influential people in the Dominican Republic.

He died in Santo Domingo and was buried on March 26, 2002, at Christ the Redeemer cemetery, where his eulogy was read by the Dominican lawyer, Marino Vinicio "Vincho" Castillo Rodríguez.
