= Rafael Filiberto Bonnelly =

President of the Dominican Republic from 1962 to 1963

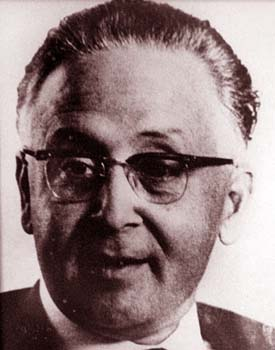
- Portrait, c. 1962

42nd President of the Dominican Republic
- In office 18 January 1962 – 27 February 1963
- Vice President: Eduardo Read Barrera (1962); Nicolas Pichardo (1962–1963)
- Preceded by: Joaquín Balaguer
- Succeeded by: Juan Bosch

25th Vice President of the Dominican Republic
- In office 3 August 1960 – 18 January 1962
- President: Joaquín Balaguer
- Preceded by: Joaquín Balaguer
- Succeeded by: Eduardo Read Barrera

Personal details
- Born: 22 August 1904 Santiago de los Caballeros, Dominican Republic
- Died: 28 December 1979 (aged 75) Santo Domingo, Dominican Republic
- Party: PRD (1960–1979)
- Other political affiliations: Dominican (1940–1960)
- Spouse: Aida Mercedes Batlle (m. 1930)
- Relations: Furcy Fondeur LaJeneusse (grandfather)
- Children: 4
- Education: Universidad Autónoma de Santo Domingo
- Profession: Lawyer; Scholar; Diplomat

Rafael Filiberto Bonnelly Fondeur (22 August 1904 – 28 December 1979) was a Dominican politician, lawyer, scholar, diplomat who served as the 42nd president of the Dominican Republic from 1962 until 1963. Previously, he was the 25th vice president under President Joaquín Balaguer from 1960 to 1962.

== Early life ==
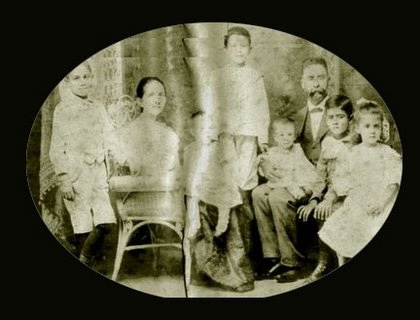
The Bonnelly-Fondeur family, circa 1902. The marriage of María Luisa Fondeur and Carlos Sully Bonnelly, appears alongside their children: Carlos Sully Rafael, Carmen Camelia Florencia, Manuel Furcy, Manuel Ulises, Raúl, and Luis Alberto.

Rafael Filiberto Bonnelly Fondeur was born to Carlos Sully Bonnelly Arnaud and Luisa Fondeur in Santiago de los Caballeros, the Dominican Republic. Bonnelly was born into a family of Corsican and French descent, descendants of white colonists that settled briefly in Saint-Domingue prior the Haitian Revolution, two generations of the Bonnelly family lived in Charlotte Amalie, Saint Thomas, and then they moved to the Cibao region in the Dominican Republic. While the origins of his Fondeur family was said to be born in Bordeaux and Paris (between 1812 and 1818, proposed Penzo), they may have arrived at the years of España Boba (Foolish Spain) or during the Haitian occupation (for the author cited between 1819 and 1822).

Bonnelly obtained his baccalaureate in Law on March 27, 1926, from the university of Santo Domingo. He became a teacher at the Normal School in Santo Domingo from 1926 to 1930. Bonnelly married his former student, Aida Mercedes Batlle, in 1930. The couple had four children during their marriage: Luisa Amelia, Rafael Francisco, Juan Sully and Aida María. Bonnelly was also the uncle of fashion designer Sully Bonnelly.

Bonnelly's first foray into public life was his participation in the revolt against President Horacio Vásquez in 1930, led by Dr. Rafael Estrella Ureña, and supported by then head of the Army, General Rafael Trujillo. Bonnelly later became a Deputy at the National Congress, but rapidly had a falling out with Trujillo, who had deported Dr. Estrella Ureña and assumed the Presidency of the Country, after publicly voting against an Education bill sent by the dictator to Congress.

His fall out with Trujillo in 1931 led to a 12-year professional hiatus, in which Bonnelly was prevented from working as a lawyer. The return of Dr. Estrella Ureña to the Dominican Republic in 1942, under an amnesty granted by Trujillo, led to Bonnelly's reappearance into Dominican public life as a Senator, between 1942 and 1944. After Dr. Ureña's death in 1945, Bonnelly started an ascending career as a public servant, which culminated with his naming as President of the Dominican Republic in January 1962.

=== Ancestors ===
Ancestors of Rafael Filiberto Bonnelly

8. Pierre Bonnelly (Charlotte Amalie, 1798–ib, 1844)
4. Francisco Ulises Bonnelly Coutin (Charlotte Amalie, 1825–Santiago, 1923)
9. Marie-Lucette Coutin (Charlotte Amalie, 1798–Puerto Plata, 1886)
2. Carlos Sully Bonnelly Arnaud (Puerto Plata, 1858–Santiago, 1923)
10. Sully Arnaud
5. Buenaventura Carmen Arnaud (Santiago, 1830–Puerto Plata, 1877)
1. Rafael Filiberto Bonnelly Fondeur
12. Louis Fondeur
6. Furcy Fondeur Lajeunesse (Paris, 1814–Santiago, 1892)
13. Marguerite LaJeunesse, Comtesse De La Juvenile
3. María Luisa Fondeur Fernández (Santiago, 1863–ib., 1949)
14. Juan Fernández Hinojosa
7. María Luisa Fernández Fernández (Puñal, 1837–Santiago, 1895)
15. Martina Fernández Féliz

Source: Instituto Dominicano de Genealogía

== Public service ==
During these years, Bonnelly held the following posts:

1944–46 Minister of the Interior; 1946–48 Minister of Labor; 1948–49 Attorney General; 1949–53 Dean of the University of Santo Domingo; 1949–53 Professor of Constitutional and Civil Law; 1953–54 Prime Minister; 1954 Minister of Education; 1954–56 Ambassador to Spain; 1956–57 Minister of Justice, 1957–59 Ambassador to Venezuela; 1960–62 vice-president of the Dominican Republic.

Bonnelly's main achievement as president was to organize the Dominican Republic's first free elections after the end of the 30-year-long Trujillo dictatorship, in which Dr. Juan Bosch was elected. But, during his brief but intensive Presidency, Bonnelly's Government wrote and passed some of the principal legislation in the country, such as the Banking and Housing laws, which are still used.

In 1966, Bonnelly made an unsuccessful run for the presidency in an election which was won by Dr. Joaquín Balaguer, with strong backing from the government of American President Lyndon Johnson. Bonnelly and Balaguer were friends in their early days, and served together in several posts during the Trujillo dictatorship, but they became political opponents after Balaguer was ousted from the Presidency in 1961, being substituted by Bonnelly, his vice-president at the time.

== Head to head with Balaguer ==
Bonnelly's last public bout with Balaguer was a national display of penmanship between the two leaders, right after the national elections of May 1978. Seeing that Balaguer's Partido Reformista was losing the elections, Balaguer's generals raided the Electoral Board and stopped the vote counting, sinking the country in a state of unrest and uncertainty. During two weeks, Bonnelly and Balaguer engaged in a public debate published in the main newspapers of the country, which ended with Balaguer accepting his defeat and proclaiming Antonio Guzmán, the candidate for the Partido Revolucionario Dominicano (PRD) and the President-Elect.

In the summer of 1979, he was awarded the Doctorate Honoris Causa by the Pontificia Universidad Católica Madre y Maestra (PUCMM), the leading private university in the country. On December 28, 1979, Dr. Rafael Bonnelly died of cancer in his home in Santo Domingo.

Political offices
Preceded by Joaquín Balaguer	Vice President of the Dominican Republic; 1960 – 1962	Succeeded by Eduardo R. Barrera
Preceded by Civic-Military Council	President of the Dominican Republic; 1962 – 1963	Succeeded by Juan Bosch
