= Great Triumvirate =

Group of statesmen who dominated early 19th-century US politics

The Great Triumvirate

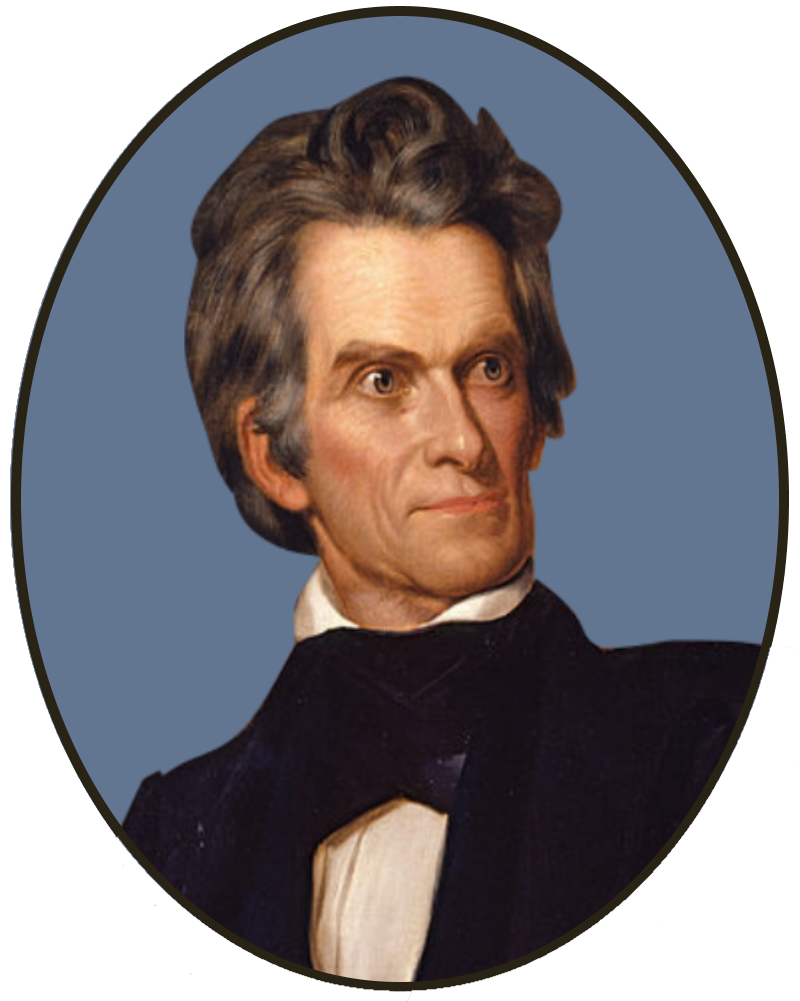
John C. Calhoun

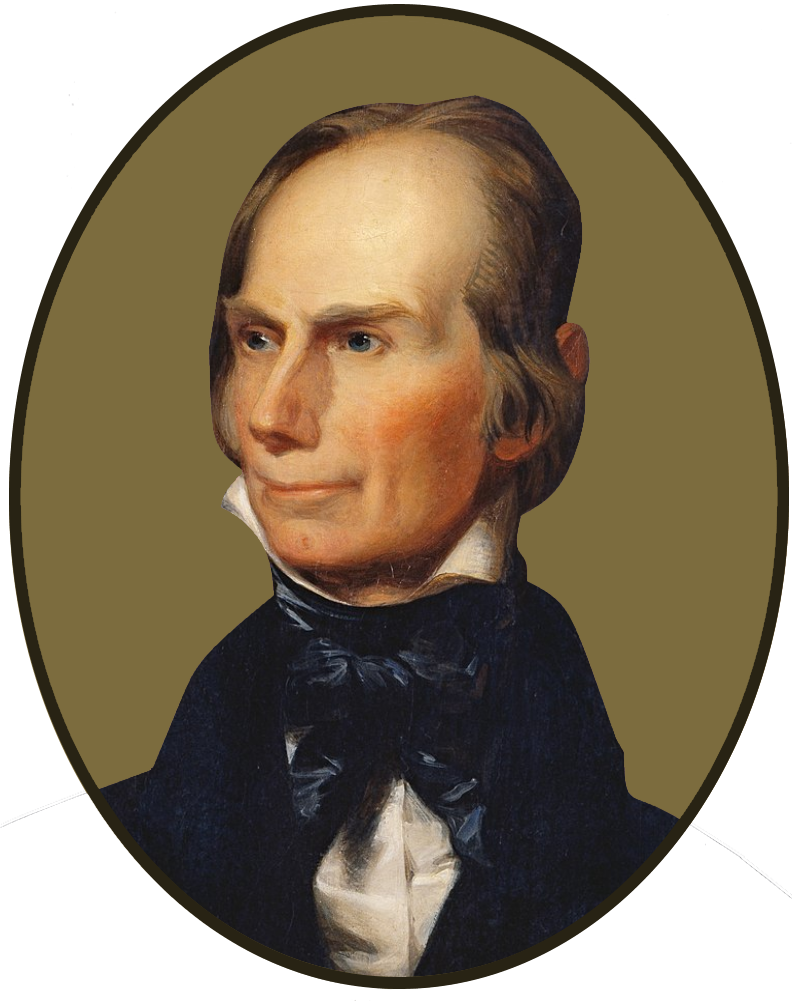
Henry Clay

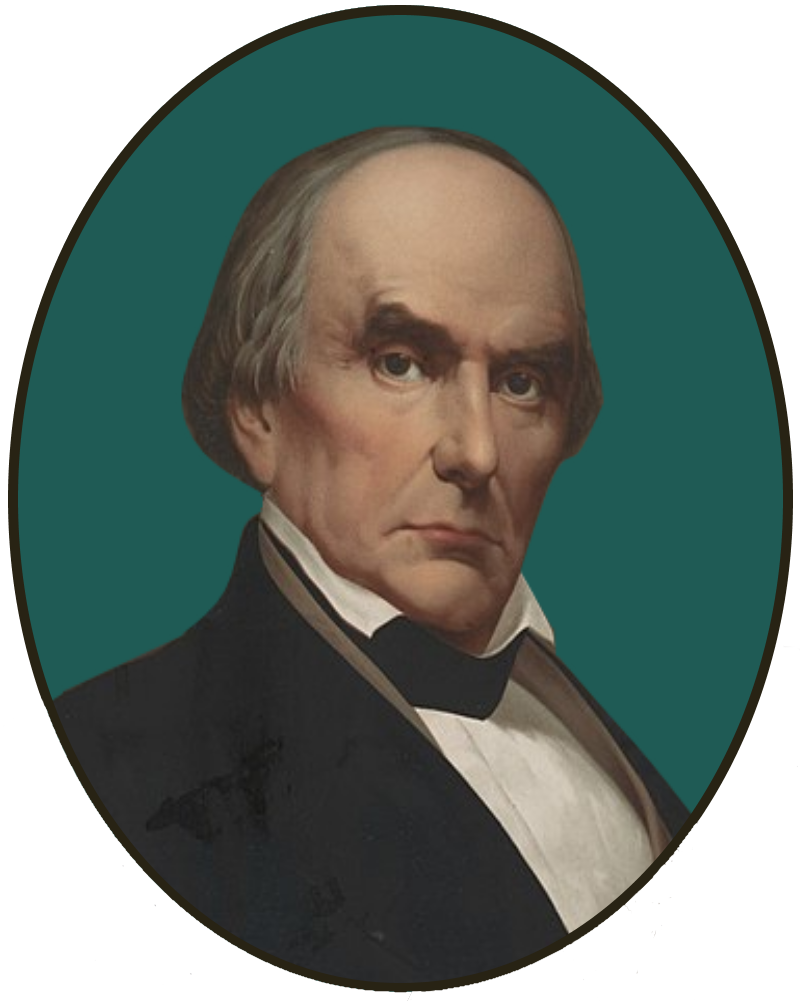
Daniel Webster

The three senators and statesmen (arranged here alphabetically) dominated American politics during the Second Party System (1828–1852), from the start of the John Quincy Adams administration through the Compromise of 1850.

In U.S. politics, the Great Triumvirate (known also as the Immortal Trio) was a triumvirate of three statesmen who dominated American politics for much of the first half of the 19th century, namely Henry Clay of Kentucky, Daniel Webster of New Hampshire, and John C. Calhoun of South Carolina. These men's interactions in large part tell the story of politics under the Second Party System. All three were extremely active in politics, served at various times as Secretary of State, as Representatives in the House of Representatives and served together as Senators in the Senate.

Clay, the oldest, emerged on the national political scene first, serving as counsel for former Vice President Aaron Burr in his treason trial and serving two short stints in the Senate before being elected Speaker of the House of Representatives for the Twelfth Congress. Calhoun was a freshman member of this Congress and his friendship and ideological closeness with Clay helped propel him to prominence as a leader of the war hawk faction agitating for a war which would eventually be declared as the War of 1812. Webster was elected in 1813 to Congress and immediately became a leading anti-war and anti-administration Federalist. Webster wrangled with the nationalists Clay and Calhoun on post-war issues such as the chartering of the Second Bank of the United States and the Tariff of 1816. After the Fourteenth Congress, Calhoun became Secretary of War and Webster declined reelection to focus on his law practice in Boston, a practice which took him before the Supreme Court in landmark cases like Dartmouth College v. Woodward, Gibbons v. Ogden, and McCulloch v. Maryland in which he represented the Bank of the United States.

The three were reunited in the Senate in 1832, with Calhoun's resignation from the vice presidency and election to the Senate in the midst of the Nullification Crisis. The three would remain in the Senate until their deaths, with exceptions for Webster and Calhoun's tenures as Secretary of State and Clay's presidential campaigns in 1844 and 1848. The time these three men spent in the Senate represents a time of rising political pressure in the United States, especially on the matter of slavery. With each one representing the three major sections of the United States at that time and their respective mindsets (the Western settlers, the Northern businessmen, and the Southern slaveholders), the Great Triumvirate symbolized the opposing viewpoints of the American people and their voices in the government. The debates leading to the Compromise of 1850 were the last major contribution of the three as they were eclipsed by a new generation of political leaders like Jefferson Davis, William H. Seward, and Stephen A. Douglas.

Calhoun was so ill at the time of the Senate debate on the Compromise that he was unable to deliver his fiery speech opposing it, instead having it read for him by James Mason while he sat in the chamber. Calhoun would die just two weeks later on March 31, 1850. Within three years, Clay and Webster would die as well.

== See also ==
- Bourbon Triumvirate
