= Las Manaclas =

Human settlement in the Dominican Republic

Coordinates: 19.290608°N 71.088195°W

Las Manaclas is a town in San José de las Matas, in Santiago Province, Dominican Republic.
