= Estero Hondo =

Darnisa
- Location within the Dominican Republic
- Coordinates: 19°49′48″N 71°10′12″W
- Country: Dominican Republic
- Province: Puerto Plata

Population (2008)
  - Total: 1 777
- Climate: Aw

Estero Hondo is a town in Puerto Plata, Dominican Republic with six localities. It is known for its coral sand beaches and clear waters, such as Playa Puerto Coral, El Pato, El Buren, La Ensenada, and Punta Rucia. It features the Estero Hondo Manatee Sanctuary National Park.

It is historically known for the June 1959 anti-Trujillo military expedition.

== History ==
It is a historic town due to the military expedition on June 14, 1959, led by Enrique Jiménez Moya.

== Sources ==
- World Gazeteer: Dominican Republic – World-Gazetteer.com
