= Emilio de los Santos =

Dominican politician

Emilio de los Santos (October 12, 1903 San Juan de la Maguana – June 10, 1986 Santo Domingo) was a Dominican politician who served as President of the Dominican Republic from September 1963 to December 1963.

== Career ==
In 1963, he served as President of Electoral college and selected as President of the Dominican Republic and in December 1963, he resigned.
