= Dominican Civil War =

1965 civil war in the Dominican Republic

- Part of the Cold War
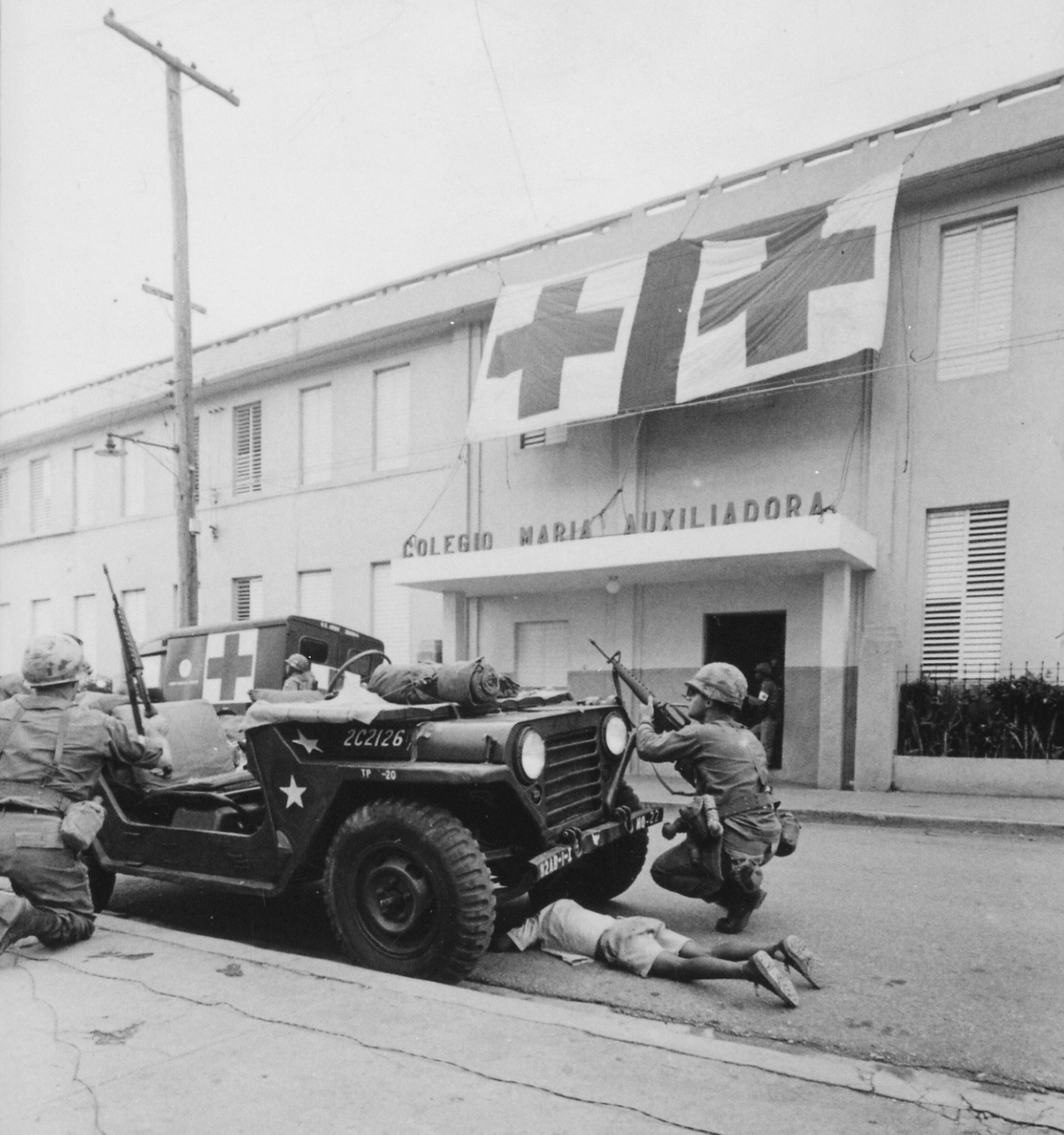
- American soldiers during a firefight while a child takes cover under a jeep in Santo Domingo on May 5, 1965.
Date	April 24 – September 3, 1965 (4 months, 1 week and 3 days)
Location	Santo Domingo, Dominican Republic
Result	Loyalist victory: Ceasefire declared; Formation of the provisional government for new elections; Deposition of Juan Bosch of the presidency ratified; Organization of presidential elections in 1966 under international supervision; Election of Joaquín Balaguer as the new president; Establishment of the Fourth Dominican Republic on July 1, 1966

Belligerents
Loyalist faction; Dominican National Police; Dominican Army; Dominican Air Force; Dominican Navy; United States IAPF: Brazil; Paraguay; Nicaragua; Costa Rica; El Salvador; Honduras	Constitutionalist faction; Dominican Revolutionary Party; Dominican Communist Party; June 14th Revolutionary Movement

Commanders and leaders
(Dominican Republic) Elías Wessin y Wessin (Dominican Republic) Antonio Imbert Barrera (United States) Lyndon B. Johnson (United States) Robert McNamara (United States) Bruce Palmer (United States) Robert H. York (United States) Rathvon M. Tompkins (United States) Ormond R. Simpson	(Dominican Republic) Juan Bosch (Dominican Republic) Francisco Caamaño (Dominican Republic) José Rafael Molina Ureña

Strength
Loyalists: 2,200 regulars 12 AMX-13 light tanks 24 L-60 light tanks 13 Lynx armoured cars 1 frigate 4+ fighters United States: 6,924 Marines (supported by M48 Patton main battle tanks); 12,434 82nd Airborne paratroopers	Constitutionalists: 1,500 regulars 5,000 armed civilians 5+ light tanks

Casualties and losses
Dominican Republic: 500 regulars killed; 325 police killed; 5 light tanks captured; 2 P-51 Mustang fighters shot down; United States: 47 dead (including 9 Marines and 18 paratroopers killed); 283 wounded or injured; 1 M50 Ontos damaged; IAPF: 11 wounded	600 regulars killed unknown armed civilians killed 5 light tanks destroyed 1 cargo ship damaged
- 6,000 Dominican casualties and 350 U.S. casualties
- The Inter-American Peace Force (IAPF) was designed as a peacekeeping force and thus is not considered a war participant.

The Dominican Civil War (Spanish: Guerra Civil Dominicana), also known as the April Revolution (Spanish: Revolución de Abril), took place between April 24 and September 3, 1965, in Santo Domingo, Dominican Republic. It started when civilian and military supporters of the overthrown democratically elected president Juan Bosch ousted the militarily-installed dictator Donald Reid from office. The second coup prompted General Elías Wessin y Wessin to organize elements of the military loyal to the dictator Reid ("loyalists") and launch an armed campaign against the "constitutionalist" rebels.

Allegations of communist support for the rebels led to a United States invasion (codenamed Operation Power Pack), which later became an Organization of American States occupation of the country by the Inter-American Peace Force. Although ostensibly neutral, U.S. civilian and military leaders deployed troops in a way that aided the anti-Bosch forces.

In 1966, Bosch lost the presidential election to Joaquín Balaguer. Foreign troops left later that year.

== Background ==
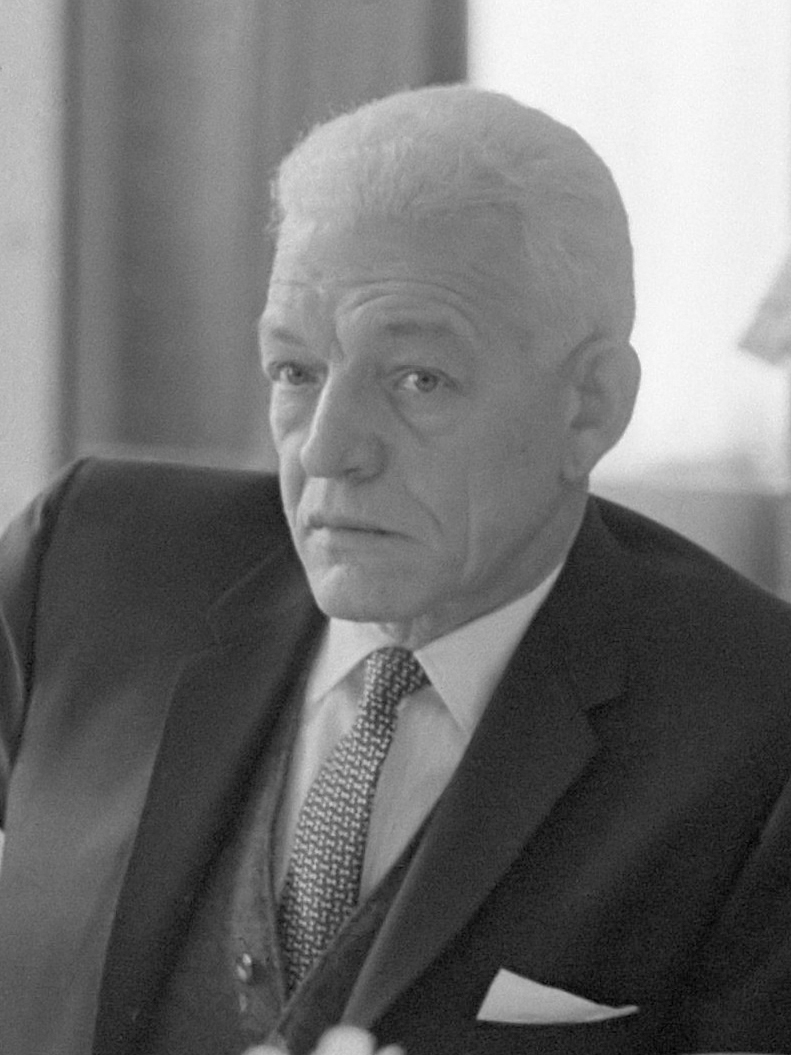
Constitutionalist troops attempted to reinstate overthrown President Juan Emilio Bosch Gaviño into power.

On November 19, 1911, General Luis Tejera led a group of conspirators in an ambush on the horsedrawn carriage of President Ramón Cáceres. During the shootout, Cáceres was killed and Tejera wounded in the leg. In the ensuing power vacuum, General Alfredo Victoria, the commander of the army, seized control and forced the Dominican Congress to elect his uncle, Eladio Victoria, as the new president. The general was widely suspected of bribing the Congress, and his uncle, who took office on February 27, 1912, lacked legitimacy. The former president Horacio Vásquez soon returned from exile to lead his followers, the horacistas, in a popular uprising against the new government.

The result was several years of great political instability and civil war. U.S. mediation by the William Howard Taft and Woodrow Wilson administrations achieved only short respites each time. A political deadlock in 1914 was broken after an ultimatum by Wilson telling Dominicans that unless they chose a president, they would see the United States impose one. A provisional president was chosen, and later that year, relatively-free elections returned the former president (1899–1902) Juan Isidro Jimenes Pereyra to power. To achieve a government that was more broadly supported, Jimenes named opposition individuals to his cabinet. However, that brought no peace and, with his former Secretary of War Desiderio Arias maneuvering to depose him and despite a U.S. offer of military aid against Arias, Jimenes resigned on May 7, 1916.

Wilson thus ordered the United States occupation of the Dominican Republic. The U.S. Marines landed on May 16, 1916, and controlled the country two months later. The U.S. military government, led by Rear Admiral Harry Shepard Knapp, was widely repudiated by Dominicans, with some factions within the country leading guerrilla campaigns against the U.S. forces. The occupation regime kept most Dominican laws and institutions and largely pacified the general population. The occupying government also revived the Dominican economy, reduced the nation's debt, built a road network that finally connected all regions of the country, and created a professional National Guard to replace the warring partisan units.

Vigorous opposition to the occupation continued, nevertheless, and after World War I, it increased in the US as well, where President Warren G. Harding (1921–23), Wilson's successor, worked to put an end to the occupation, as he had promised during his electoral campaign. The U.S. occupation ended in October 1922, and elections were held in March 1924. The victor was the former president (1902–03) Horacio Vásquez Lajara, who had co-operated with the United States. He was inaugurated on July 13, 1924, and the last U.S. forces left in September. Vásquez gave the country six years of stable governance in which political and civil rights were respected and the economy grew strongly in a relatively-peaceful atmosphere.

A rebellion or coup d'état against him broke out in February 1930 in Santiago. Rafael Trujillo secretly cut a deal with the rebel leader Rafael Estrella Ureña. In return for Trujillo letting Estrella take power, Estrella would allow Trujillo to run for president in new elections. As the rebels marched toward Santo Domingo, Vásquez ordered Trujillo to suppress them. However, feigning "neutrality," Trujillo kept his men in barracks, which allowed Estrella's rebels to take the capital virtually unopposed. On March 3, Estrella was proclaimed acting president, with Trujillo confirmed as the head of the police and of the army. As per their agreement, Trujillo became the presidential nominee of the newly formed Patriotic Coalition of Citizens (Spanish: Coalición patriotica de los ciudadanos), with Estrella as his running mate. The other candidates became targets of harassment by the army and withdrew when it became apparent that Trujillo would be the only person who would be allowed to campaign effectively. Ultimately, the Trujillo-Estrella ticket was proclaimed victorious with an implausible 99% of the vote. According to the U.S. ambassador, Trujillo received more votes than there were actual voters.

On May 30, 1961, Trujillo was shot and killed when his blue 1957 Chevrolet Bel Air was ambushed on a road outside the Dominican capital. He was the victim of an ambush plotted by a number of men, such as General Juan Tomás Díaz, Antonio de la Maza, Amado García Guerrero, and General Antonio Imbert Barrera.

The country came under the rule of a military junta until 1963, when democratic elections were organized with U.S. aid. Juan Emilio Bosch Gaviño emerged victorious in the elections, assuming office.

Juan Emilio Bosch Gaviño was the first democratically elected president of the Dominican Republic. Sworn into office on February 27, 1963, he tried to implement a number of social reforms, which caused the anger of the business magnates and members of the army, who initiated a rumor campaign that accused Bosch of being a communist. On September 25, 1963, a group of 25 senior military commanders, led by General Elías Wessin y Wessin, expelled Bosch from the country and installed Donald Reid Cabral as the new president. (Note: From September to December 1963, Emilio de los Santos posed as the nominal president of the country, but Donald Reid Cabral, his vice president, held the real power, as he was the cousin of Juan Bautista Vicini Cabral, the richest man in the post-Trujillo Dominican Republic. On December 28, 1963 de los Santos resigned and Reid Cabral assumed the presidency directly.) Reid failed to gather popular support, and several factions prepared to launch a counter-coup: Constitutionalists under Bosch, a group in the Dominican army under Peña Taveras, supporters of the former Dominican Revolutionary Party leader Nicolás Silfa and plotters siding with Joaquín Balaguer.

== Civil war ==
=== April Revolution ===
A Universal Newsreel about the U.S. invasion.

On April 24, 1965, three junior officers requested a meeting with President Donald Reid Cabral, who rejected the offer after he had received news of a suspected anti-government plot. When Chief of Staff Riviera Cuesta was instead sent to discuss with the officers at the August 16 military camp, he was immediately detained. A group of military constitutionalists and Dominican Revolutionary Party (DRP) supporters then seized the Radio Santo Domingo building and issued calls of sedition while Constitutionalist officers distributed weapons and Molotov cocktails to their civilian comrades. The transmissions prompted the garrison of the February 27 camp and a unit of the Dominican Navy's frogmen to defect. Large numbers of police officers abandoned their positions and changed into civilian clothing.

The following day, Reid appointed General Wessin y Wessin as the new chief of staff. Wessin rallied the government troops, branded them Loyalists, and announced his plans of suppressing the rebellion. At 10:30 a.m., rebels stormed the presidential palace and arrested Reid. Several hours later, four Loyalist P-51 Mustangs bombed the National Palace and other Constitutionalist positions; one plane was shot down by ground troops with a machine gun. A single Loyalist vessel, Mella, on the river Ozama, also bombarded the palace. Fearing that a mob, which had gathered at the palace, would lynch Reid, the rebel commander Francisco Caamaño allowed him to escape, as Reid had already lost the support of the Loyalists. The majority of the DRP leadership fled the capital, and Constitutionalists mobilized a total of 5,000 armed civilians and 1,500 members of the military. On April 26, two P‑51s and two Vampire jets attacked Santo Domingo, strafing with .50‑caliber machine guns and 20 mm cannons, dropping 500‑lb bombs, and firing 5‑inch HVAR rockets. Two Constitutionalist artillery companies were destroyed by these air attacks and accompanying heavy artillery fire.

=== U.S. intervention ===
United States occupation of the Dominican Republic (1965–1966)
- Part of the Dominican Civil War
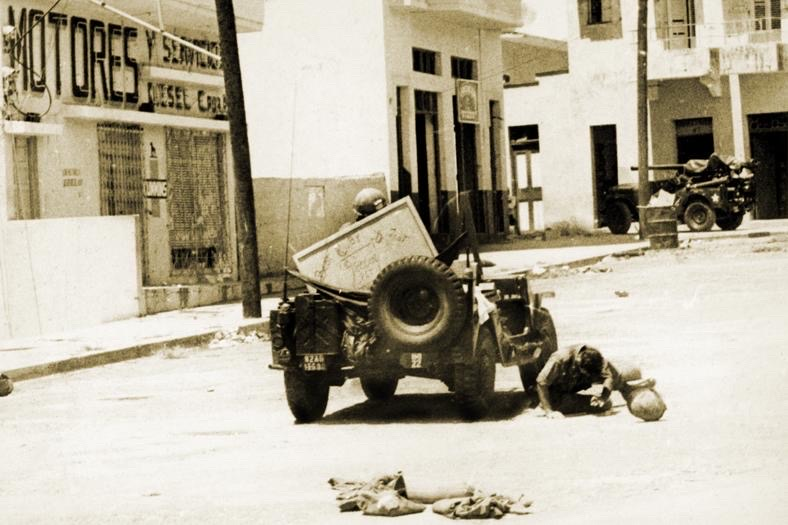
- Wounded American soldier in Santo Domingo, 1965.
Date	28 April 1965 – 21 September 1966 (1 year, 4 months, 3 weeks and 3 days)
Location	Santo Domingo, Dominican Republic
Result	Allied victory

Belligerents
United States (pro-government state intervener); Organization of American States (OAS)	(Dominican Republic) Constitutionalists

Strength
22,500 U.S troops (mostly 82d Airborne Division and 4th Marine Expeditionary Brigade); 1,800 OAS troops	2,000–4,000

Casualties and losses
27 killed 183 wounded (Note: including 6 Brazilians and 5 Paraguayans wounded in action)	77+ killed (Note: In one incident, Marines returned fire on snipers, killing four rebels. Near the presidential palace, paratroopers returned fire, killing six rebels and wounding nine. Americans and Dominicans skirmished several times but fought only one battle, which occurred on June 15–16, 1965, in the Dominican-held Ciudad Nueva area of the city, where the 82nd Airborne Division lost 5 KIA and 36 WIA, while inflicting casualties of 67 KIA and 165 WIA on the Dominican forces.); 174+ wounded

In the meantime, U.S. diplomats in Santo Domingo initiated preparations for evacuating 3,500 U.S. citizens. In the early morning of April 27, a group of 1,176 foreign civilians who had assembled in Hotel Embajador were airlifted to the Bajos de Haina naval facility, where they boarded USS Ruchamkin and USS Wood County, as well as the helicopters of HMM-264, which evacuated them from the island to USS Boxer and USS Raleigh. Later that day, 1,500 Loyalist troops, supported by armored cars and tanks, marched from the San Isidro Air Base, captured Duarte Bridge, and took position on the west bank of the Ozama River. A second force, consisting of 700 soldiers, left San Cristóbal and attacked the western suburbs of Santo Domingo. Wessin y Wessin ordered his armored units to cross the Duarte Bridge into Santo Domingo's center. However, the tanks quickly became bogged down in the narrow streets and were destroyed, abandoned, or captured by armed civilians.

Rebels overran the Fortaleza Ozama police headquarters and took 700 prisoners. On April 28, armed civilians attacked the Villa Consuelo police station and executed all of the police officers who survived the initial skirmish. One U.S. Marine Corps battalion landed in Haina and later moved to Hotel Embajador, where it provided assistance in the upcoming airlifts. During the night, 684 civilians were airlifted to USS Boxer. One US Marine was killed by a rebel sniper during the operation. A Loyalist Vampire jet fired six rockets at a rebel tank and narrowly missed the American embassy. On April 29, the U.S. Ambassador to the Dominican Republic, William Tapley Bennett, who had sent numerous reports to U.S. President Lyndon Johnson, reported that the situation had reached life-threatening proportions for US citizens and that the rebels were communists. Bennett stressed that the U.S. had to act immediately, as the creation of an international coalition would be time-consuming. Contrary to the suggestions of his advisers, Johnson authorized the transformation of evacuation operations into a large-scale military invasion through Operation Power Pack, which was aimed to prevent the development of what he saw as a second Cuban Revolution. It was the first overt U.S. military intervention in Latin America in more than 30 years, although it came on the heels of U.S.-backed coups in Guatemala and Brazil, as well as ongoing covert operations in Cuba.

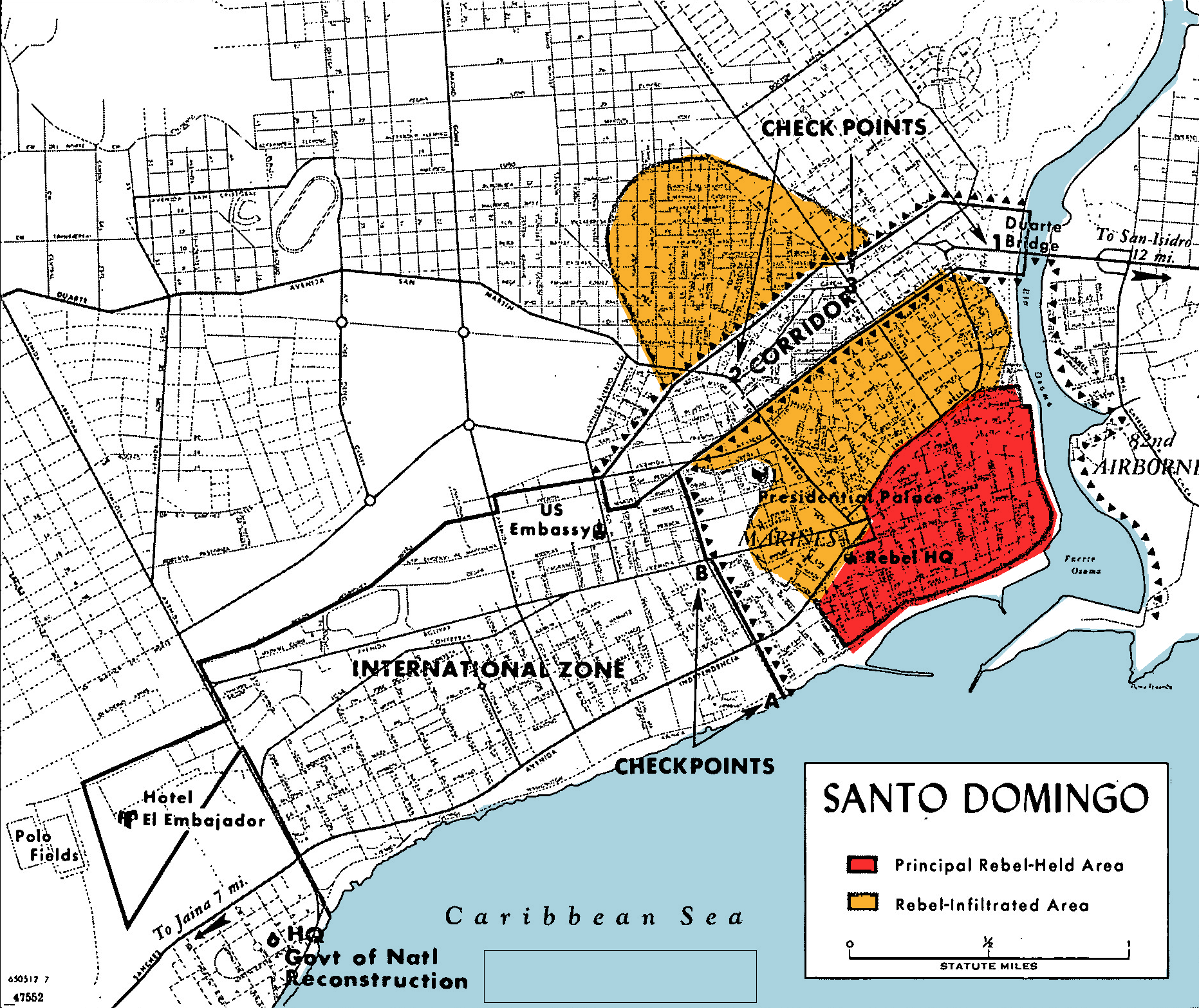
International Security Zone map and rebel-dominated area, 13 May 1965

At 2:16 a.m. on April 30, 1965, the 3rd Brigade of the 82nd Airborne Division landed at the San Isidro Air Base and started the U.S. military intervention in the conflict. During the next couple of hours, two brigade combat teams and heavy equipment were also dispatched. At sunrise the 1st Battalion, 508th Infantry Regiment moved up the San Isidoro highway under the cover of Marine F-4 Phantom jets flying from Puerto Rico, securing a position east of the Duarte bridge. More units of the 82nd Airborne landed and secured the entire east bank of the Ozama River. Rebel positions across the river were destroyed by 105 mm howitzers. U.S. soldiers crossed the bridge and occupied a six-block area on the western side of the Duarte Bridge, but suffered casualties from sniper fire. The 1st Battalion 505th Infantry Regiment remained at the airbase and sent out patrols to the perimeter. A force of 1,700 Marines of the 6th Marine Expeditionary Unit occupied an area containing a number of foreign embassies. The locale was proclaimed an International Security Zone by the Organization of American States (OAS). Earlier in the day, the OAS also issued a resolution calling the combatants to end all hostilities. At 4:30 p.m., representatives of the loyalists, the rebels, and the U.S. military signed a ceasefire that was to take effect at 11:45 p.m. That timing favored the demoralized Loyalists, who had lost control of Ciudad Colonial.

On May 5, the OAS Peace Committee arrived in Santo Domingo, and a second definite ceasefire agreement was signed, which ended the main phase of the civil war. On May 6, Dominican rebels killed four Marines with machine gun fire, wounded another, and captured two others, who were later released. Under the Act of Santo Domingo, the OAS was tasked with overseeing the implementation of the peace deal as well as distributing food and medication through the capital. The treaties failed to prevent some violations such as small-scale firefights and sniper fire. A day later, OAS members established the Inter-American Peace Force (IAPF) with the goal of serving as a peacekeeping formation in the Dominican Republic. The IAPF had 1,748 Brazilian, Paraguayan, Nicaraguan, Costa Rican, Salvadoran and Honduran troops and was headed by Brazilian General Hugo Panasco Alvim, with US Army General Bruce Palmer serving as his deputy commander. General Palmer proposed sending U.S. troops to eliminate the northern rebel sector and shut down the rebel-held radio station, but Washington blocked any offensive operations involving U.S. troops.

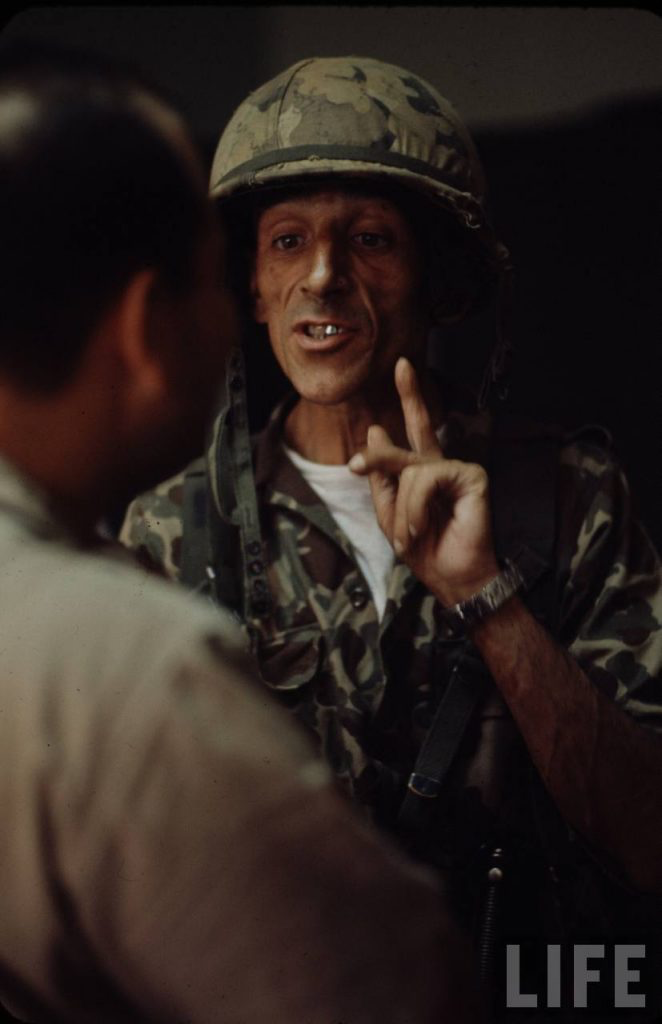
Italian mercenary Illio Capocci during the civil war. He fought with the Constitutionalists and was killed by Loyalist forces on May 19, 1965.

Utilizing Radio Santo Domingo as their primary weapon, the rebels launched a psychological campaign against the United States, the OAS, and the Loyalists. Through numerous outlets, studios, and transmission sites nationwide, they employed Radio Santo Domingo to incite a nationwide rebellion. In response, American forces initiated jamming operations, deploying Army Security Agency (ASA) units on land, air force units in the skies, and naval ships at sea. Additionally, a reinforced company from the army's 7th Special Forces Group, led by Col. Edward Mayer, attacked critical relay sites beyond the capital. Their initial efforts were not effective, however, and rebel broadcasts continued to make their influence felt countrywide.

On May 7, 1965, the Government of National Reconstruction (GNR) was established with Antonio Imbert Barrera as president. On May 13, the GNR launched an air attack on Radio Santo Domingo and its main transmitter sites. One of the planes accidentally strafed U.S. troops, prompting the Americans to return fire and shoot down another P-51 of World War II vintage. The following day, the GNR initiated an offensive against the rebel-held northern sector. They overwhelmed the rebels' initial defense line, seizing control of the majority of the city's industrial sector. By May 21, GNR troops had completed the destruction of the rebel northern zone and captured Radio Santo Domingo, and following talks with Constitutionalist leaders and Presidential Adviser McGeorge Bundy, a ceasefire was in effect by May 25.

== United States withdrawal ==
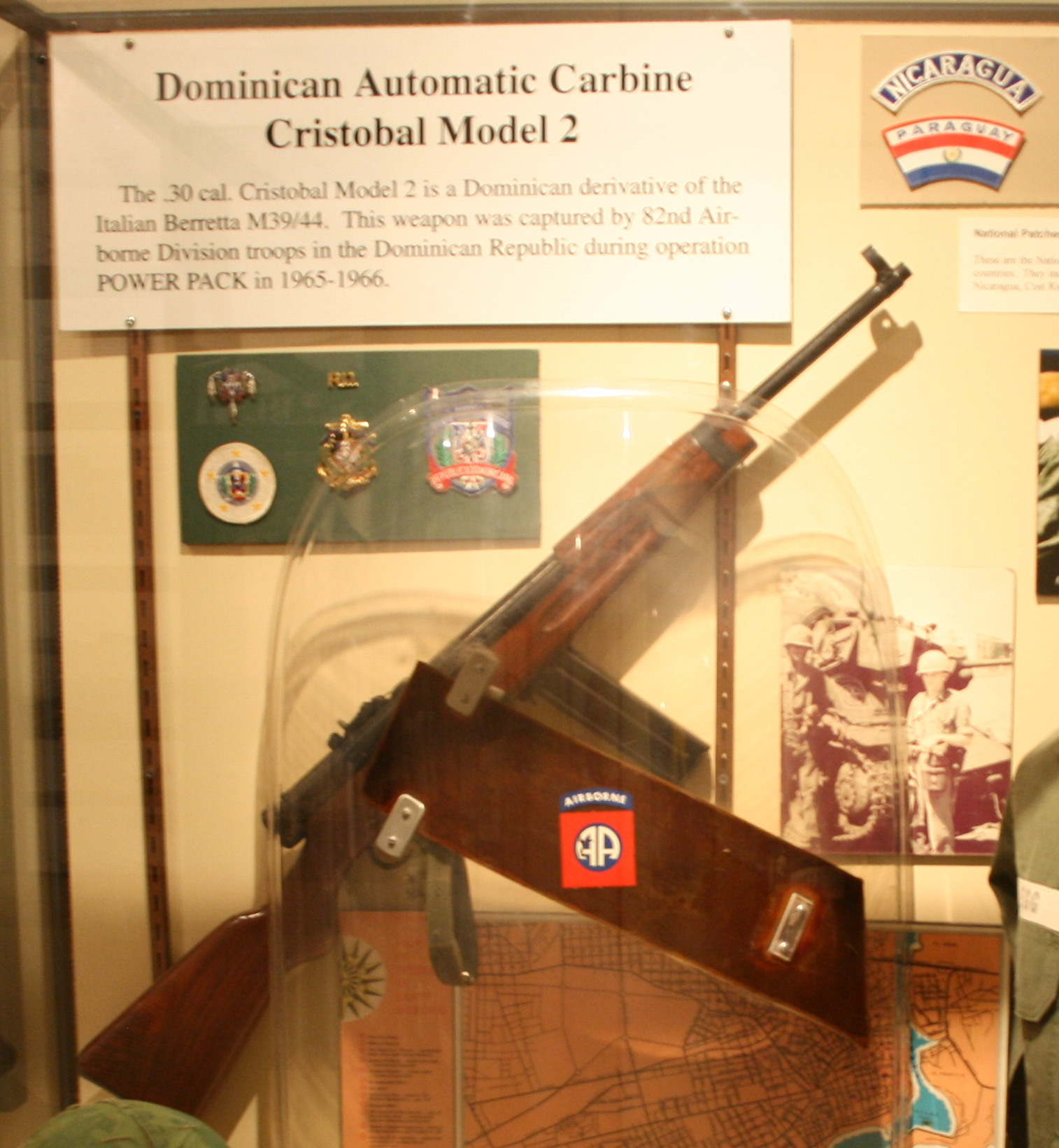
Dominican automatic carbine captured by 82nd Airborne troops during Operation Power Pack

On May 26, 1965, U.S. forces began gradually withdrawing from the island. By June 6, no U.S. Marines remained on the island, leaving elements of the 82nd Airborne as the primary U.S. combat force. The total U.S. troop strength at that time had decreased to about 12,000. On June 15, the Constitutionalists launched a second and final attempt to expand the boundaries of their stronghold. In the bloodiest battle of the intervention, the rebels began their attack on U.S. outposts. Using the greatest firepower yet, they used tear gas grenades, .50-caliber machine guns, 20 mm guns, mortars, rocket launchers, and tank fire. A rebel tank fired on an 82nd Airborne command post, severing a radioman's leg; paratroopers destroyed the tank with a 106-mm recoilless rifle. The 1st battalions of the 505th and 508th Infantry quickly went on the offensive, advancing into a forty-block area, overrunning sandbagged street positions, and pushing four to six blocks into the rebel-held zone. Two days of fighting cost the 82nd Airborne 5 killed and 36 wounded in action. The OAS forces, whose orders were to remain at their defenses, counted five wounded. The Constitutionalists lost 67 killed and 165 wounded; among the dead was André Rivière, a French soldier of fortune.

The civil war formally ended on August 31, 1965, with a ceasefire agreement, followed by the establishment of a provisional government on September 3, 1965. The first postwar elections were held on July 1, 1966, and pitted the conservative Reformist Party candidate, Joaquín Balaguer, against the former president Juan Emilio Bosch Gaviño. Balaguer emerged victorious in the elections after he built his campaign on promises of reconciliation. On September 21, 1966, the last OAS peacekeepers withdrew from the island, which ended the foreign intervention in the conflict.

== See also ==
- United States occupation of the Dominican Republic (1916–24)
- Johnson Doctrine
- United States involvement in regime change
- Latin America–United States relations
- List of United States invasions of Latin American countries
- Foreign interventions by the United States
- United States military casualties of war

== Sources ==
- Palmer, Bruce (2015). Intervention in the Caribbean: The Dominican Crisis of 1965 (ePub version). Lexington, United States: University Press of Kentucky. ISBN 9780813150024.
