= Juan Bosch (politician) =

20th-century Dominican politician and writer (1909 –2001)

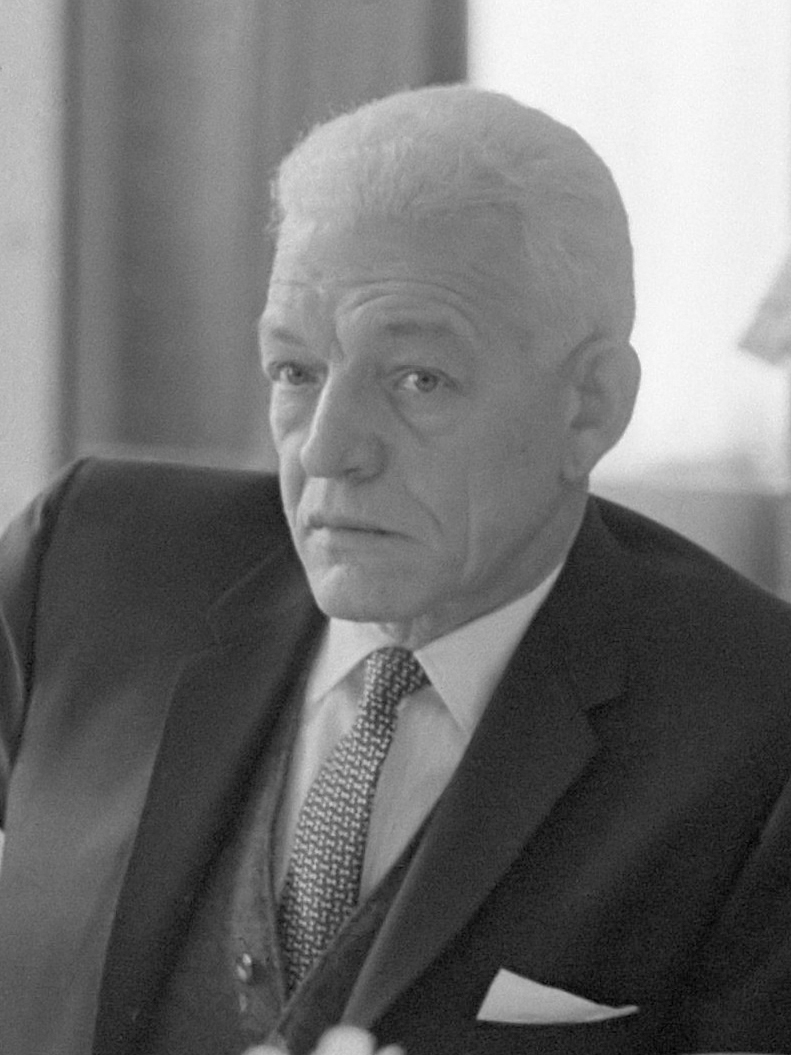
- Bosch in 1963

President of the Dominican Republic
- In office 27 February – 25 September 1963
- Vice President: Armando González Tamayo
- Preceded by: Rafael Filiberto Bonnelly
- Succeeded by: Dominican Provisional Government Junta

Personal details
- Born: 30 June 1909 La Vega, Dominican Republic
- Died: 1 November 2001 (aged 92) Santo Domingo, Dominican Republic
- Party: Revolutionary (1939–73); Liberation (1973–2001)
- Spouse(s): Isabel García (m. 1934–1943?); Carmen Quidiello (m. 1943–2001; his death)
- Nickname: El Profesor (The Teacher)

Juan Emilio Bosch y Gaviño (30 June 1909 – 1 November 2001), also known as El Profesor (Spanish for the Teacher), was a Dominican politician, historian, writer, essayist, educator, and the first democratically elected president of the Dominican Republic for seven months in 1963.

Juan Bosch was a leading opponent against the dictatorial regime of Rafael Trujillo, spending over two decades as the leader of the Dominican opposition while in exile. In 1939, he helped found the Dominican Revolutionary Party (PRD) and returned to the Dominican Republic months after Trujillo's assassination in 1961, winning the first free elections in decades. In 1973, he founded the Dominican Liberation Party (PLD). He is remembered as an honest politician and regarded as one of the most prominent short-story writers in Dominican literature.

== Early life ==
Juan Bosch Gaviño was born in the city of La Vega on 30 June 1909. His father was a Spaniard of Catalan origin, and his mother was a Spaniard Puerto Rican from Juana Diaz, Puerto Rico. He lived the first years of his childhood in a rural community called Río Verde, where he began his primary studies. He did his secondary studies at the San Sebastián de La Vega school, only reaching the third level of high school. In 1924 he moved to Santo Domingo, where he worked in several commercial stores. Later in 1929 he traveled to Spain, Venezuela and some Caribbean islands.

In 1934, he married Isabel García and had two children with her: Leon and Carolina. During Trujillo's dictatorship, Bosch was jailed for his political ideas, being released after several months. In 1938, Bosch managed to leave the country, settling in Puerto Rico.

== Exile ==
By 1939 Bosch had gone to Cuba, where he directed an edition of the completed works of Eugenio María de Hostos, something that defined his patriotic and humanist ideals. In July, with other Dominican expatriates, he founded the Partido Revolucionario Dominicano (PRD), which stood out as the most active front against Trujillo outside the Dominican Republic.

Bosch heavily sympathised with leftist ideas, but he always denied any communist affiliation. He collaborated with the Cuban Revolutionary Party and had an important role in the making of Cuba's 1940 Constitution.

Bosch met his second wife, Carmen Quidiello, a Cuban poet and playwright, in Matanzas in 1941. The couple married in 1943 and had two children, Patricio and Barbara. At the same time, his literary career was ascending, gaining important acknowledgments like the Hernandez Catá Prize in Havana for short stories written by a Latin American author. His works had a deep social content, among them "La Noche Buena de Encarnación Mendoza", "Luis Pié", "The Masters" and "The Indian Manuel Sicuri", all of them described by critics as masterpieces of their sort.

Bosch was one of the main organizers of the abortive Cayo Confites expedition of 1947, in which a military force backed by the Caribbean Legion unsuccessfully attempted to invade the Dominican Republic from Cuba. Bosch fled to Venezuela after the expedition's failure, where he continued his anti-Trujillo campaign. In Cuba, where he returned by requirement of his friends in the Authentic Revolutionary Party, he played a notorious part in the political life of Havana, being recognized as a promoter of social legislation and author of the speech pronounced by President Carlos Prío Socarrás when the body of José Martí was transferred to Santiago de Cuba.

When Fulgencio Batista led a coup d'état against Prío Socarrás and took over the presidency in 1952, Bosch was jailed by Batista's forces. After being liberated, he left Cuba and headed to Costa Rica, where he dedicated his time to pedagogical tasks, and to his activities as leader of the PRD.

Molasses tycoon Jacob Merrill Kaplan earned his fortune primarily through operations in Cuba and the Dominican Republic. The J.M. Kaplan Fund was found in a 1964 congressional investigation to be a conduit for funneling CIA money to Latin America, including through the Institute of International Labor Research (IILR) headed by Norman Thomas, six-time presidential candidate for the Socialist Party of America. These funds were used in Latin America by José Figueres Ferrer, Sacha Volman, and Juan Bosch.

Via the Fund, the CIA gave Figueres money to publish a political journal, Combate, and to found a left-wing school for Latin American opposition leaders. Funds passed from a shell foundation to the Kaplan Fund, next to the IILR, and finally to Figueres and Bosch.

In 1959 the Cuban Revolution took place, led by Fidel Castro, causing a major political, economic and social upheaval in the Caribbean island. Cord Meyer, a CIA official, was chief of International Organizations Division, a CIA-sponsored group for promoting democracy in international groups. He used the contacts with Bosch, Volman, and Figueres for a new purpose – as the United States moved to rally the hemisphere against Cuba's Fidel Castro and Rafael Trujillo, the strongman caudillo who had run the Dominican Republic for 30 years and had become a liability. The United States needed to demonstrate that it opposed all dictators, not just those on the left.

Bosch accurately perceived the process that had begun from those events and wrote a letter to Trujillo, dated 27 February 1961. He told Trujillo that his political role, in historical terms, had concluded in the Dominican Republic.

For over a year, the CIA had been in contact with dissidents inside the Dominican Republic who argued that assassination was the only certain way to remove Trujillo. According to Chester Bowles, the Undersecretary of State, internal Department of State discussions in 1961 on the topic were vigorous. Richard N. Goodwin, Assistant Special Counsel to the President, who had direct contacts with the rebel alliance, argued for intervention against Trujillo. Quoting Bowles directly: "The next morning I learned that in spite of the clear decision against having the dissident group request our assistance Dick Goodwin following the meeting sent a cable to CIA people in the Dominican Republic without checking with State or CIA; indeed, with the protest of the Department of State. The cable directed the CIA people in the Dominican Republic to get this request at any cost. When Allen Dulles found this out the next morning, he withdrew the order. We later discovered it had already been carried out."

== Presidency and opposition ==
In May 1961, the ruler of the Dominican Republic, Rafael Trujillo was assassinated. An internal CIA memorandum states that a 1973 Office of Inspector General investigation into the assassination disclosed "quite extensive Agency involvement with the plotters." The CIA described its role in "changing" the government of the Dominican Republic "as a 'success' in that it assisted in moving the Dominican Republic from a totalitarian dictatorship to a Western-style democracy."

After 23 years in exile, Juan Bosch returned to his homeland months after Trujillo was assassinated. His presence in the national political life, as the Dominican Revolutionary Party presidential candidate, was a fresh change for the Dominicans. His manner of speaking, direct and simple, especially when addressing the lowest classes, appealed to farmers as much as people from the cities. Immediately he was accused by the Church but he threatened to pull out of the election, which caused the Church to retract the accusation; Conservatives also accused him of being a communist. However, in the elections of 20 December 1962, Bosch and his running mate, Armando González Tamayo, won a sweeping victory over Viriato Fiallo of the National Civic Union in what is acknowledged to be the first free election in the country's history.

On 27 February 1963, Bosch was sworn in as president in a ceremony that was attended by important democratic leaders and personalities of the region, like Luis Muñoz governor of the U.S. territory of Puerto Rico and José Figueres of Costa Rica. Bosch immediately launched a deep restructuring of the country. On 29 April, he promulgated a new social democratic constitution. The new document changed the laws in various ways. Among other things, it declared specific labour regulations, and mentioned unions, pregnant women, homeless people, the family, rights for the child and the young, for the farmers, and for illegitimate children.

However, Bosch faced powerful enemies. He moved to break up latifundia, drawing the ire of landowners. The Church thought Bosch was trying to oversecularize the country. Industrialists did not like the new Constitution's guarantees for the working class. The military, who previously enjoyed free rein, felt Bosch put them on too short a leash.

== Coup d'état ==
On 25 September 1963, after only seven months in office, Bosch was overthrown in a coup led by General Elias Wessin y Wessin, General Antonio Imbert Barreras, and other military leaders which established a three-man military junta. Bosch was deported to Guadeloupe on 28 September 1963, but would fly to Puerto Rico on 1 October 1963, where he spent the remainder of his exile.

Less than two years later, growing dissatisfaction generated another military rebellion on 24 April 1965, that demanded Bosch's restoration. The insurgents, commanded by Colonel Francisco Caamaño, removed the junta from power on 28 April. The United States dispatched 42,000 troops to the island in Operation Power Pack during the ensuing civil war in support of the anti-Bosch forces.

An interim government was formed, and elections were fixed for 1 July 1966. Bosch returned to the country and ran as his party's presidential candidate. However, he ran a somewhat muted campaign, fearing for his safety and believing he would be thrown out of office by the military again if he won. He was soundly defeated by Joaquín Balaguer, who garnered 57% of the vote. The last US battalion left in September 1966.

During the last half of the 1960s, Bosch remained a very prolific writer of essays, both political and historical. He published some of his most important works during this time: "Dominican Social Composition", "Brief History of the Oligarchy in Santo Domingo", "From Christopher Columbus to Fidel Castro", and numerous articles of different sorts.

By 1970, Bosch had the intention of reorganizing the PRD and turning its members into active, studious militants of the historical and social reality of the country. His project was not accepted by most of the PRD, most of whose members were turning in a more mainstream social democratic direction. Also, given the military repression, and lack of political equality between the PRD and the official Reformist Party, Bosch abstained from the 1970 elections.

Bosch became studious of Marxist ideology. He described himself as a "Marxist- non Leninist". The differences and contradictions between Bosch and an important sector of the PRD on ideology, as well as the corruption that had started to grow within the party, made him leave the organization in 1973, and thus he founded the Dominican Liberation Party (PLD) on 15 December of that same year. The PLD originally was considerably to the left of Bosch's original party, the Dominican Revolutionary Party which continued to advocate for social democracy within the Socialist International organization.

Later he ran unsuccessfully for president as the PLD candidate in 1978, 1982, 1986, 1990, and 1994. He came closest to winning in 1990, when he lost narrowly in an election marred by a large number of irregularities favouring the Balaguer campaign, and PLD allegations of fraud against the PRD.

After placing third in the 1994 election, Bosch retired from politics at the age of 83.

== Death and legacy ==
Juan Bosch died on 1 November 2001, in Santo Domingo. As a former president, he received the corresponding honors at the National Palace, and was buried in his hometown of La Vega. A metro station in Santo Domingo was named in Bosch's honor in 2009.

His wife, former First Lady Carmen Quidiello, died on 19 December 2020, at the age of 105.

== Bibliography ==
=== Short stories ===
- Camino real
- Cuentos escritos antes del exilio
- Cuentos escritos en el exilio
- Dos pesos de agua
- El Funeral
- Más cuentos escritos en el exilio

=== Novels ===
- La mañosa
- El oro y la paz

=== Biography ===
- David, biografía de un Rey (Librería Dominicana, Santo Domingo, 1963)
  - English translation: David: The Biography of a King (Hawthorn Books, New York, 224 pages, 1965)

=== Essays ===
- Hostos, el sembrador
- Cuba, la isla fascinante
- Judas Iscariote, el calumniado
- Apuntes sobre el arte de escribir cuentos
- Trujillo: causas de una tiranía sin ejemplo
- Simón Bolívar: biografía para escolares
- Crisis de la democracia de América
- Bolívar y la guerra social
- Pentagonismo, sustituto del imperialismo
- Dictadura con respaldo popular
- De Cristóbal Colón a Fidel Castro: el Caribe Frontera Imperial
- Breve historia de la oligarquía en Santo Domingo
- Composición social dominicana
- La revolución haitiana
- De México a Kampuchea
- La guerra de la Restauración en Santo Domingo
- Capitalismo, democracia y liberación nacional
- La fortuna de Trujillo
- La pequeña burguesía en la historia de la Repúblia Dominicana
- Capitalismo tardío en la República Dominicana
- El Estado, sus orígenes y desarrollo
- Póker de espanto en el Caribe
- El PLD, un nuevo partido en América
- Breve historia de los pueblos árabes
- Viaje a los Antipodas

Political offices
Preceded by Rafael Bonnelly	President of the Dominican Republic; February 1963 – September 1963	Succeeded by triumvirate (at first briefly led by Emilio de los Santos and later led by Donald Reid Cabral)
