= 2012 Dominican Republic presidential election =

- 20 May 2012
- Turnout: 70.23% (▼1.13pp)
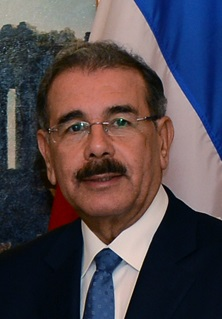

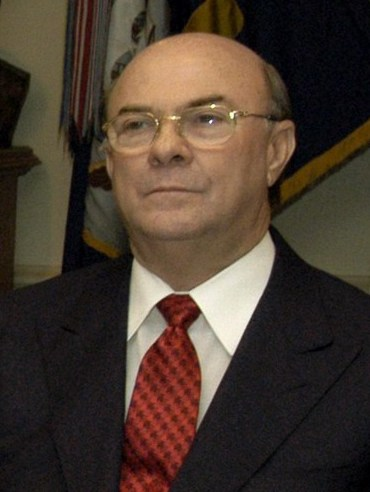
Nominee	Danilo Medina	Hipólito Mejía
Party	PLD	PRD
Running mate	Margarita Cedeño	Luis Abinader
Popular vote	2,323,150	2,129,997
Percentage	51.21%	46.95%
- Results by province
President before election
Leonel Fernández
PLD
President-elect
Danilo Medina
PLD

Presidential elections were held in the Dominican Republic on 20 May 2012. They were the fifth quadrennial elections for the presidency and vice-presidency since 1998, when a change in the electoral law separated the presidential from the congressional and municipal elections.

As specified in the new constitution ratified in January 2010, the presidential elections of 2012 coincided with the election of Overseas Deputies in Dominican expatriate communities. Since 1974 parliamentary and presidential elections had taken place on 16 May every other year. However, the constitutional reform of 2009 stipulated in article 209 that the elections would be held on 20 May 2012 to avoid their falling on a work day. Candidates for the presidency competed for the highest number of votes, with the leader needing more than 50% of valid ballots to avoid a second round.

Danilo Medina of the ruling Dominican Liberation Party was elected president with a majority of votes in the first ballot.

This was the first election to involve participation by Dominican citizens abroad. In addition to voting for the president and vice-president, Dominican expatriates participated in by-elections for seven new seats (within three overseas constituencies) in the Chamber of Deputies.

== Background ==
In 2008 Leonel Fernández of the Dominican Liberation Party defeated candidates Miguel Vargas Maldonado of the Dominican Revolutionary Party; Amable Aristy Castro of the Social Christian Reformist Party; Eduardo Estrella of the Revolutionary Social Democratic Party; Trajano Santana of the Independent Revolutionary Party; Guillermo Moreno of the Movement for Independence, Unity and Change; and Pedro de Jesús Candelier of the Popular Alliance Party in the presidential elections, while the Dominican Liberation Party maintained a considerable majority in both houses of Congress. The main topics of the campaign of 2008 were the issue of reelection, the macroeconomic stability maintained by the Fernández government, and the alleged corruption which dominated the political landscape. The Santo Domingo Metro and other national matters were also important topics, especially during the final months of the campaign.

During Fernández's third presidential term several public works projects were carried out, a second line of the metro was opened, tourism grew, and free-trade zones were expanded. There was a constitutional reform, new judges were appointed to the Supreme Court, and the Electoral and Constitutional Tribunals were created. Several treaties were ratified, including seven bilateral accords with the government of Haiti on the Bolivarian Solidarity Fund to finance projects, border security, commerce, migration, health, the environment, and agriculture, as well as an accord with Colombia on air transport. Also passed was a law granting fiscal amnesty to all employers behind on their payments into the Social Security system; nonetheless, the attempt to apply it in its entirety failed.

In the congressional and municipal elections of 2010, the Dominican Liberation Party won the majority of representatives in both houses of Congress, while the Dominican Revolutionary Party only managed a few seats in the Chamber of Deputies and none in the Senate.

A 2011 poll found that the majority of Dominicans were unhappy with the government. Nevertheless, although many Dominicans believed that Fernández could lead them through the economic difficulties, they showed themselves to be dissatisfied with his program.

The internal crisis of the two main contending parties led to divisions within both of them, unleashing mutual defections among their members. The PRD was afflicted with the most complicated internal conflict. In spite of agreeing to campaign in a civil fashion in a resolution signed by both parties in March 2012, this was not observed and the parties pursued an aggressive campaign strategy.

== Electorate ==
6.5 million Dominican voters were eligible to vote in the 2012 election. There were 14,470 polling places open for the election: 13,865 precincts were located within the Dominican Republic, while an additional 605 precincts were open overseas. Approximately 300,000 expatriates, making up around 5% of the total electorate, were eligible to vote abroad. The election board had set up official precincts for Dominicans voters living in the United States, Belgium, Canada, France, Germany, Italy, the Netherlands, Spain, Panama, Switzerland and Venezuela. More than 100,000 of the eligible voters resided in the U.S. state of New York.

=== Electorate by age and sex ===
Age Range	Women	Men	Total	Percentage
16–29	888,510	865,755	1,754,265	27.0
30–39	747,387	727,760	1,475,147	22.7
40–49	653,423	640,059	1,293,482	19.9
50 or older	1,004,744	975,330	1,980,074	30.4
Total	3,294,064	3,208,904	6,502,968	100

=== Electorate by province ===
Province	Voters	Percentage
Santo Domingo	1,254,526	19.29
Distrito Nacional	775,417	11.92
Santiago	685,874	10.55
San Cristóbal	349,598	5.38
La Vega	282,955	4.35
Duarte	220,061	3.38
Puerto Plata	219,537	3.38
San Pedro de Macorís	190,405	2.93
Espaillat	169,704	2.61
San Juan	169,454	2.61
La Romana	152,090	2.34
Azua	144,268	2.22
Peravia	124,594	1.92
Monseñor Nouel	123,734	1.90
La Altagracia	121,119	1.86
Monte Plata	118,195	1.82
Barahona	114,852	1.77
Sánchez Ramírez	113,196	1.74
Valverde	104,958	1.61
María Trinidad Sánchez	100,644	1.55
Hermanas Mirabal	83,878	1.29
Monte Cristi	76,003	1.77
Bahoruco	65,179	1.00
Samaná	64,340	0.99
Hato Mayor	62,892	0.97
El Seibo	55,909	0.86
Santiago Rodríguez	47,605	0.73
San José de Ocoa	46,538	0.72
Dajabón	46,303	0.71
Elías Piña	40,629	0.62
Independencia	32,460	0.50
Pedernales	17,402	0.27

=== Expatriate electorate ===
Country	Voters	Percentage
United States	223,250	37.9
Spain	62,670	19.1
Lesser Antilles	11,531	3.5
Italy	9,581	2.9
Venezuela	5,848	1.8
Panama	5,439	1.6
Switzerland	4,261	1.3
Canada	2,697	0.8
Netherlands	2,564	0.8
France	520	0.2
Germany	288	0.1

== Political parties ==
A total of 24 political parties were represented on the electoral ballot, including the two large parties and 22 small parties. The small parties are those which do not receive more than 10% of the vote and which are clearly not directly rivaling the main candidates. These parties generally choose to ally themselves with one of the large parties. Thirteen parties were previously rejected by the Central Electoral Commission.

- Dominican Revolutionary Party (PRD)
  Allies:
  - Alternative Democratic Movement (MODA)
  - Revolutionary Social Democratic Party (PRSD)
  - Dominican Humanist Party (PHD)
  - Institutional Democratic Party (PDI)
  - Dominican Social Alliance (ASD)
- Dominican Liberation Party (PLD)
  Allies:
  - Social Christian Reformist Party (PRSC)
  - Institutional Social Democratic Bloc (BIS)
  - Civic Renovation Party (PCR)
  - Christian Democratic Union (UDC)
  - Quisqueyano Christian Democratic Party (PQDC)
  - National Progressive Force (FNP)
  - Dominican Workers' Party (PTD)
  - Christian People's Party (PPC)
  - Popular Democratic Party (PDP)
  - National Unity Party (PUN)
  - Liberal Party of the Dominican Republic (PLRD)
  - Liberal Action Party (PAL)
  - Green Socialist Party (PASOVE)
- Alliance for Democracy (APD)
- Country Alliance (ALPAIS)
- Broad Front (FA)
- Dominicans for Change (DxC)

== Primary elections ==
The Dominican Liberation Party and Dominican Revolutionary Party held primary elections with the following results.

- Dominican Liberation Party
  - Danilo Medina - 323,465 votes (87.65%)
  - José Tomás Pérez - 18,004 votes (4.88%)
  - Francisco Domínguez Brito - 4,988 votes (4.7%)
  - Radhamés Segura - 12,168 votes (3.30%)
- Dominican Revolutionary Party
  - Hipólito Mejía - 494,100 votes (53.30%)
  - Miguel Vargas Maldonado - 432,972 votes (46.70%)

Notas

== Candidates ==
Six candidates ran in the election, with former president Hipólito Mejía of the Dominican Revolutionary Party (PRD) and ex-parliamentarian Danilo Medina of the ruling Dominican Liberation Party (PLD) being considered most likely to win. Mejía and Medina had already faced each other in the 2000 election. The constitution barred incumbent president Leonel Fernández of the PLD from running for a third term.

Candidate	Age	Political organization	Proclamation of candidacy	Vice-presidential candidate
Hipólito Mejía	70	Dominican Revolutionary Party	6 March 2011	Luis Abinader
Danilo Medina	60	Dominican Liberation Party	26 June 2011	Margarita Cedeño
Guillermo Moreno	55	Country Alliance	7 August 2011	Chiqui Vicioso
Eduardo Estrella	59	Dominicans for Change	18 September 2011	Fauntly Garrido
Max Puig	66	Alliance for Democracy	11 August 2011	Luz María Abreu
Julián Serulle	65	Broad Front	5 June 2011	Fidel Santana

== Results ==
=== President ===
Candidate	Party	Votes	%
Danilo Medina	Dominican Liberation Party and allies	2,323,463	51.21
Hipólito Mejía	Dominican Revolutionary Party and allies	2,130,189	46.95
Guillermo Moreno García	Country Alliance	62,296	1.37
Eduardo Estrella	Dominicans for Change	9,343	0.21
Julián Serulle	Broad Front	6,553	0.14
Max Puig	Alliance for Democracy	5,066	0.11
Total		4,536,910	100.00
Valid votes		4,536,910	99.34
Invalid/blank votes		30,142	0.66
Total votes		4,567,052	100.00
Registered voters/turnout		6,502,968	70.23
Source: IFES

=== Overseas deputies ===
Party	Votes	%	Seats
Dominican Revolutionary Party	61,617	44.74	4
Dominican Liberation Party	50,700	36.81	3
Social Christian Reformist Party	11,257	8.17	0
Revolutionary Social Democratic Party	1,950	1.42	0
Social Democratic Institutional Bloc	1,873	1.36	0
Country Alliance	1,838	1.33	0
Dominican Workers' Party	847	0.61	0
Quisqueyano Christian Democratic Party	796	0.58	0
Christian Democratic Union	783	0.57	0
Alternative Democratic Movement	694	0.50	0
Dominicans for Change	652	0.47	0
Institutional Democratic Party	575	0.42	0
Alliance for Democracy	522	0.38	0
National Progressive Force	498	0.36	0
Broad Front	467	0.34	0
Christian People's Party	432	0.31	0
People's Democratic Party	428	0.31	0
Dominican Humanist Party	417	0.30	0
National Unity Party	393	0.29	0
Civic Renovation Party	242	0.18	0
Liberal Party of the Dominican Republic	240	0.17	0
Liberal Action Party	216	0.16	0
Dominican Social Alliance	171	0.12	0
Green Socialist Party	124	0.09	0
Total	137,732	100.00	7
Valid votes	137,732	98.49	
Invalid/blank votes	2,106	1.51	
Total votes	139,838	100.00	
Registered voters/turnout	164,538	84.99	
Source: JCE

==== Deputies elected ====
Constituency	Elected member	Party
1	ALFREDO ANTONIO RODRÍGUEZ AZCONA	Dominican Liberation Party
1	JOSÉ ERNESTO MOREL SANTANA	Dominican Revolutionary Party
1	RUBÉN DARÍO LUNA MARTÍNEZ	Dominican Revolutionary Party
2	ADELIS DE JESÚS OLIVARES ORTEGA	Dominican Revolutionary Party
2	LEVIS SURIEL GÓMEZ	Dominican Liberation Party
3	MARCELO AGUSTÍN MERCEDES MOSCAT	Dominican Revolutionary Party
3	MARCOS GENARO CROSS SÁNCHEZ	Dominican Liberation Party

== Reactions ==
After the PLD declared victory, supporters of Mejía complained about cases of fraud, including vote-buying, and announced to contest the result. Mejía refused to concede to Medina and doubted the result. The PRD representative on the Central Electoral Commission claimed that the official result reflected much fewer votes than Mejía should have had received, and indicated that the head of the commission was a partisan of the PLD. Amid an overall orderly electoral process, there were some reports of adherents of both major parties offering money to voters in exchange for voting for their candidate or for passing their vote cards. Incidents of vote-buying were confirmed by the observers from the Organisation of American States (OAS), headed by Uruguay's ex-president Tabaré Vázquez. However, they considered the cases not sufficient to distort the overall result, and described the election by and large as "successful".
