= 2024 Dominican Republic general election =

- 19 May 2024
- Presidential election
- Turnout: 54.37% (▼0.92 pp)
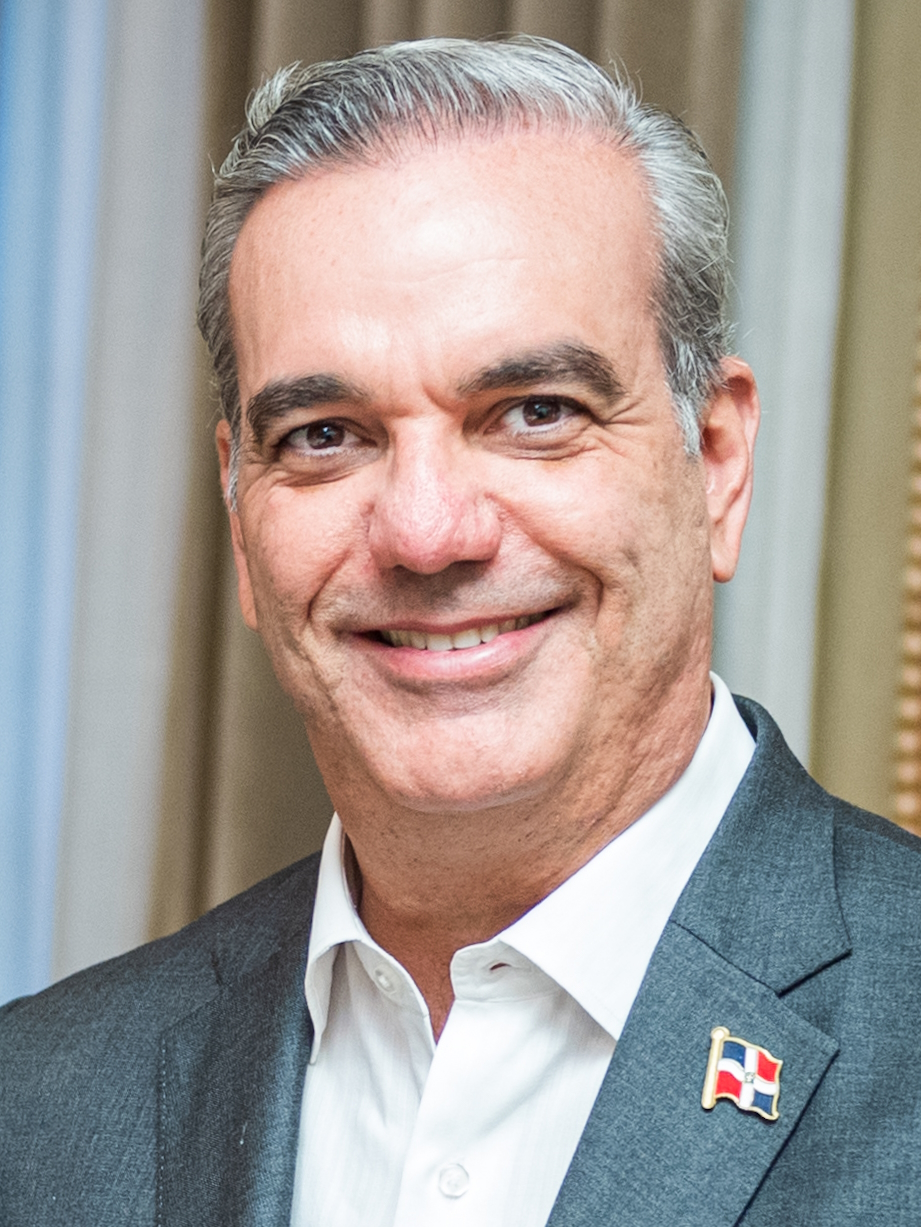

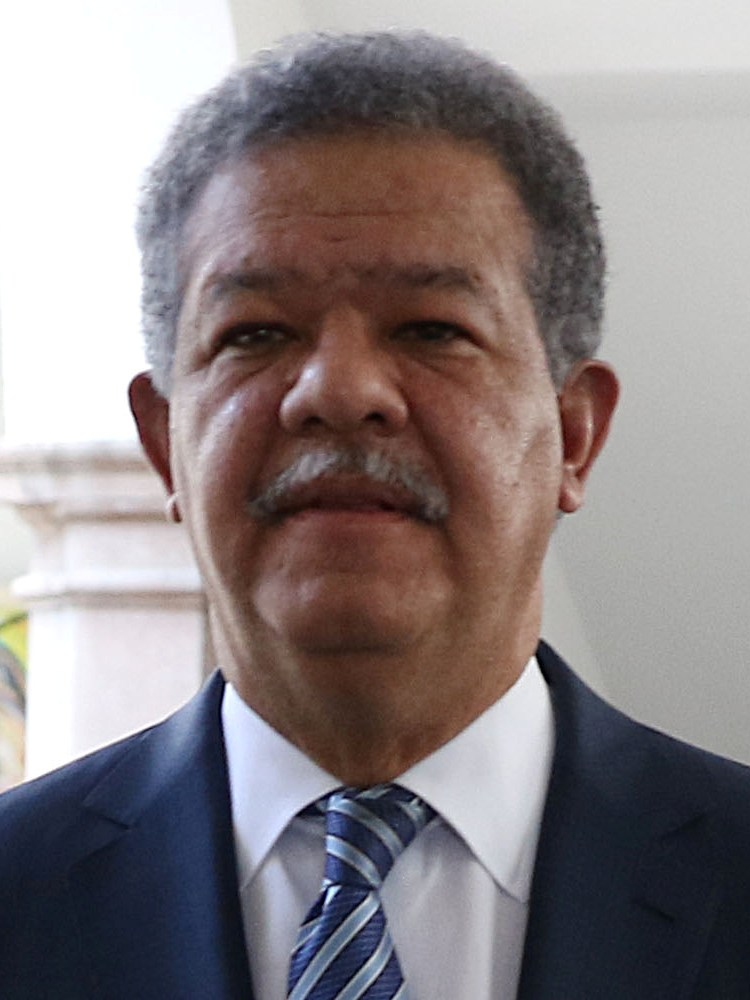

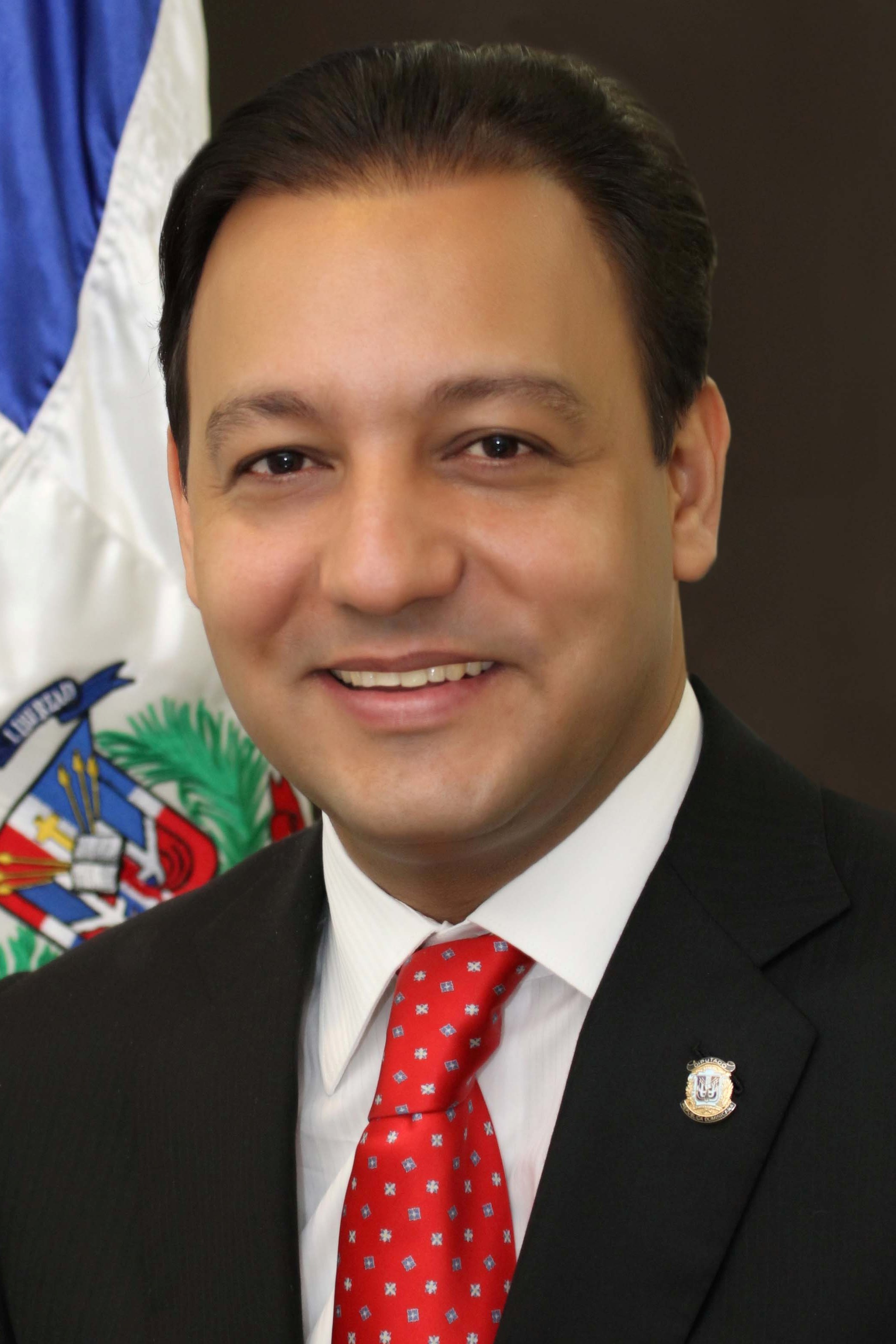
Nominee	Luis Abinader	Leonel Fernández	Abel Martínez
Party	PRM	FP	PLD
Alliance	RDA (Note: Including the PRM, PRSC, ALPAÍS, DxC, PUN, PHD, PCR, PRSD, MODA, PNVC, APD, PP, PLR, PPC, UDC, PAL, PRI, PDP, PNVC, PASOVE, PPG and JS)	JP (Note: Including FP, BIS, PQDC, PSC, FNP and PDI)
Running mate	Raquel Peña	Ingrid Mendóza	Zoraíma Cuello
Popular vote	2,507,297	1,259,427	453,468
Percentage	57.44%	28.85%	10.39%
President before election
Luis Abinader
PRM
Elected President
Luis Abinader
PRM
- Senate
- All 32 seats in the Senate; 17 seats needed for a majority
Party	Leader	Vote %	Seats	+/–
PRM	José Ignacio Paliza	45.54	24	+7
FP	Leonel Fernández	19.35	3	+2
PRSC	Quique Antún	1.42	1	−5
APD	Max Puig	0.54	1	+1
PPG	Antonio Marte	0.43	1	New
PLR	Karina Aristy	0.41	1	+1
PRI	Trajano Santana	0.26	1	+1
This lists parties that won seats. See the complete results below.
President of the Senate before	President of the Senate after
Ricardo De los Santos Polanco; PRM	Ricardo De los Santos Polanco; PRM
- Chamber of Deputies
- All 190 seats in the Chamber of Deputies; 96 seats needed for a majority
Party	Leader	Vote %	Seats	+/–
PRM	José Ignacio Paliza	48.39	134	+48
FP	Leonel Fernández	17.13	27	+24
PLD	Danilo Medina	15.03	12	−63
PRD	Miguel Vargas	2.17	1	−3
PRSC	Quique Antún	1.86	4	−2
DxC	Mateo Espaillat	1.29	2	0
PRSD	Luis Miguel de Camps	0.82	3	+2
PCR	Jorge Zorrilla	0.79	1	0
ALPAÍS	Guillermo Moreno	0.69	1	−1
PLR	Karina Aristy	0.54	1	0
PQDC	Elías Wessin Chávez	0.39	1	0
PSC	Soraya Aquino	0.24	1	New
PNVC	Juan Cohen	0.11	1	+1
This lists parties that won seats. See the complete results below.
President of the Chamber of Deputies before	President of the Chamber of Deputies after
Alfredo Pacheco; PRM	Alfredo Pacheco; PRM
- Central American Parliament
- 20 Dominican Republic seats in the Central American Parliament
Party	Leader	Vote %	Seats	+/–
PRM	José Ignacio Paliza	54.14	12	+1
FP	Leonel Fernández	21.19	4	+4
PLD	Danilo Medina	20.50	4	−4
This lists parties that won seats. See the complete results below.
- Presidential election map
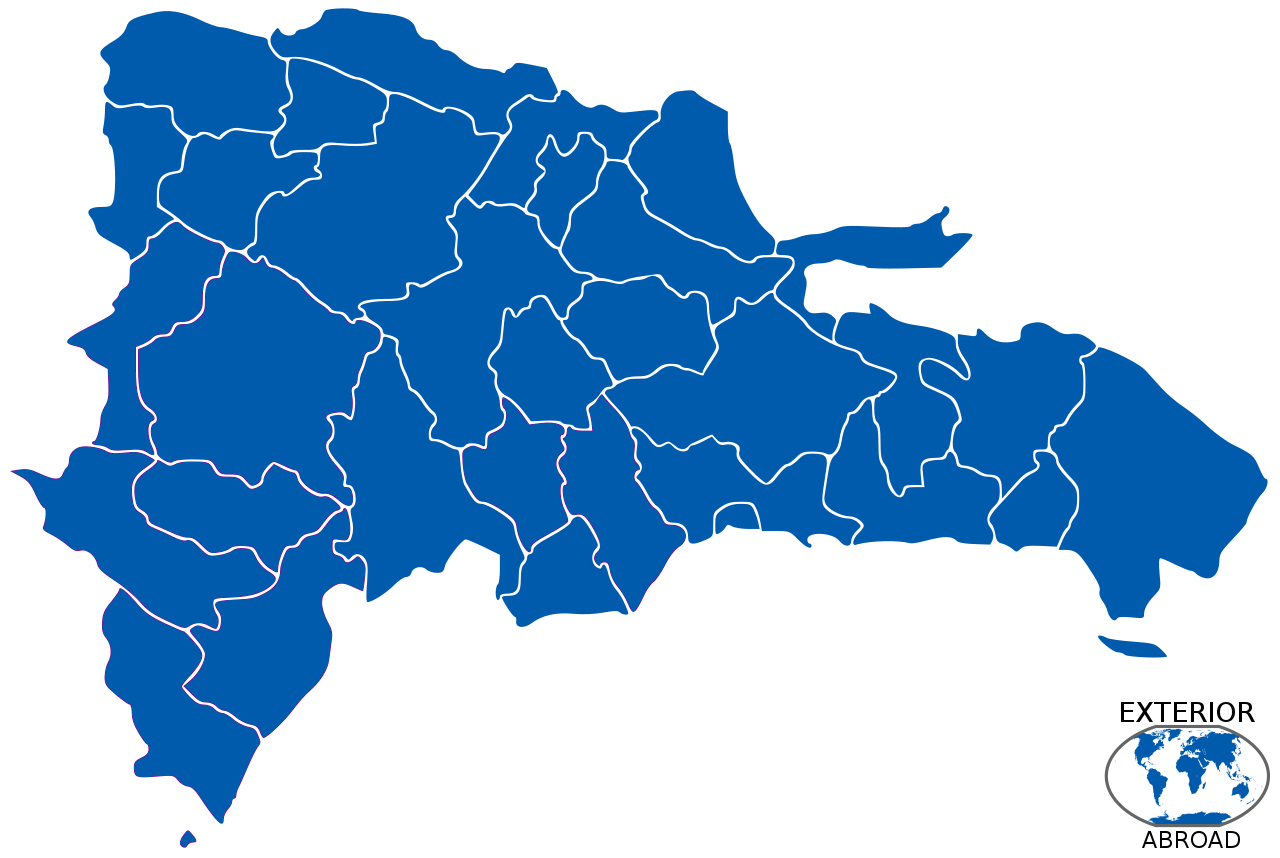
Results by province

General elections were held in the Dominican Republic on 19 May 2024 to elect a president, vice-president, 32 senators, 190 deputies and 20 PARLACEN deputies.

Incumbent President Luis Abinader won re-election to a second term with a majority of the vote in the first round, eliminating the need for a runoff.

== Electoral system ==
The President of the Dominican Republic is elected using the two-round system; if no candidate receives 50% + 1 vote, or more, of the total votes, a second-round runoff is held between the two candidates with the highest votes in the first round.

The 32 members of the Senate are elected from the 31 provinces and the Distrito Nacional using first-past-the-post voting.

The 190 members of the Chamber of Deputies are elected in three groups; 178 are elected by proportional representation from 32 multi-member constituencies based on the 31 provinces and the Distrito Nacional, with the number of seats based on the population of each province. A further seven members are elected by proportional representation by Dominican expatriates in three overseas constituencies, and five seats are allocated at the national level to parties that received at least 1% of the vote nationally, giving preference to those that did not win any of the 178 constituency seats.

The 20 seats in the Central American Parliament are elected by proportional representation.

== Conduct ==
Around eight million people were eligible to vote in this election. Voting began at 07:00 on 19 May and closed at 17:00. The process was described as smooth, apart from small irregularities reported by opposition parties.

== Candidates ==
Party	Presidential candidate	Vice presidential candidate
Partido Revolucionario Moderno (PRM)	Luis Abinader	Raquel Peña
Partido de la Liberación Dominicana (PLD)	Abel Martínez	Zoraima Cuello
Partido Fuerza del Pueblo (FP)	Leonel Fernández	Ingrid Mendoza
Partido Revolucionario Dominicano (PRD)	Miguel Vargas	Joel Díaz Ureña
Frente Amplio (FA)	María Teresa Cabrera	Jesús Díaz Morán
Movimiento Patria para Todos y Todas (MPT)	Fulgencio Severino	Francisca Peguero
Partido Generacion de Servidores (PGS)	Carlos Peña	Nikauly de la Mota
Opción Democrática (OD)	Virginia Antares Rodríguez	Ico Abreu
Partido Esperanza Democratica (PED)	Roque Espaillat	José Ernesto Fadul

== Campaign ==
Among notable issues during the campaign was the effects of the political unrest in Haiti and increased migration from the latter country. During a debate, President Abinader pledged to continue the deportation of illegal immigrants and finish construction of a wall along the border with Haiti. Both Leonel Fernandez and Abel Martínez also supported a harsh stance on migration.

== Opinion polls ==
Pollster	Date(s)	Abinader (PRM)	Martínez (PLD)	Fernandez (FP)
AtlasIntel	6–9 May 2024	65.2%	11.5%	17.3%
Acxiona	5–8 May 2024	67.2%	7.22%	21.5%
Gallup-RCC Media	1–4 May 2024	60%	11.1%	24.6%
Markestrategia	15–17 April 2024	67.9%	7.1%	18.4%
Gallup RCC Media	6–9 March 2024	64%	12%	19%
CID Gallup	27–28 February 2024	59%	13%	27%
RD Elige	20–26 February 2024	52.3%	13%	29%
Acxiona	2–5 February 2024	54%	9%	24%
ACD Media	15–18 January 2024	55.1%	10.4%	26.3%
Centro Económico del Cibao	17–18 December 2023	58.2%	9.9%	22.9%
RD Elige	1–9 December 2023	52.9%	16.9%	28.7%
Greenberg-Diario Libre	15–18 November 2023	49%	17%	29%
Markestrategia	12–14 November 2023	57.6%	10.7%	24.6%
Gallup RCC Media	25–29 October 2023	55.2%	13.5%	27.4%
Consulting Research Group	21–23 September 2023	36.3%	30.9%	20.1%
RD Elige	12–16 September 2023	53.1%	16.6%	27.8%
Markestrategia	26–28 August 2023	54.6%	12.5%	24.8%
Acxiona	1–5 August 2023	53.0%	11.0%	22.0%
Markestrategia	19–21 July 2023	55.8%	13.1%	29.1%
Gallup RCC Media	11–14 June 2023	47.7%	19.0%	28.9%
RD Elige	17–20 May 2023	47.3%	21.5%	27.0%
Sondeos	22–30 April 2023	48%	11.0%	31.0%
Gallup RCC Media	1–5 April 2023	48.5%	18.2%	25.9%
RD Elige	14–18 March 2023	44.8%	27.6%	22.4%
Grupo de Investigaciones Digitales	30 January–3 February 2023	49.9%	21.0%	18.0%
Markestrategia	20–22 January 2023	47.7%	14.8%	27.0%
Acxiona	24–28 November 2022	44.0%	17.0%	23.0%

== Results ==
Preliminary results showed that Abinader had won outright re-election in the first round with around 60% of the vote, while his Modern Revolutionary Party was expected to win a supermajority in the Congress of the Dominican Republic.

=== President ===
Candidate	Running mate	Party	Votes	%
Luis Abinader	Raquel Peña	Modern Revolutionary Party	2,507,297	57.44
Leonel Fernández	Ingrid Mendoza	People's Force	1,259,427	28.85
Abel Martínez	Zoraima Cuello	Dominican Liberation Party	453,468	10.39
Roque Espaillat	José Ernesto Fadul	Democratic Hope Party	59,396	1.36
Carlos Peña	Nikauly de la Mota	Generation of Servants Party	31,566	0.72
Virginia Antares Rodríguez	Ico Abreu	Democratic Choice	25,204	0.58
Miguel Vargas	Joel Díaz Ureña	Dominican Revolutionary Party	19,790	0.45
María Teresa Cabrera	Jesús Díaz Morán	Broad Front	6,255	0.14
Fulgencio Severino	Francisca Peguero	Country Movement for All	2,744	0.06
Total			4,365,147	100.00
Valid votes			4,365,147	98.56
Invalid/blank votes			63,932	1.44
Total votes			4,429,079	100.00
Registered voters/turnout			8,145,548	54.37
Source: JCE

=== Senate ===
The Modern Revolutionary Party won a supermajority in the Senate, seeing their seat total increase from 17 to 24.

Party	Votes	%	Seats	+/–
Modern Revolutionary Party	1,876,246	45.54	24	+7
People's Force	797,059	19.35	3	+2
Dominican Liberation Party	726,833	17.64	0	−6
Dominican Revolutionary Party	105,227	2.55	0	0
Social Christian Reformist Party	58,691	1.42	1	−5
Dominicans for Change	49,940	1.21	0	−1
Social Democratic Institutional Bloc	44,858	1.09	0	−1
National Unity Party	40,056	0.97	0	0
Social Justice	39,762	0.97	0	New
Possible Country	35,993	0.87	0	0
Country Alliance	27,307	0.66	0	0
Generation of Servants	25,097	0.61	0	New
Alliance for Democracy	22,235	0.54	1	+1
Revolutionary Social Democratic Party	21,518	0.52	0	0
Civic Renovation Party	20,405	0.50	0	0
Quisqueyano Christian Democratic Party	20,144	0.49	0	0
Dominican Humanist Party	19,767	0.48	0	0
Democratic Choice	19,043	0.46	0	New
Alternative Democratic Movement	18,961	0.46	0	0
First the People Party	17,631	0.43	1	+1
Liberal Reformist Party	17,018	0.41	1	+1
Broad Front	13,504	0.33	0	0
Democratic Hope Party	12,337	0.30	0	New
Liberal Action Party	10,946	0.27	0	0
Independent Revolutionary Party	10,674	0.26	1	+1
Christian Socialist Party	9,948	0.24	0	New
Christian People's Party	9,404	0.23	0	0
Christian Democratic Union	8,831	0.21	0	0
Institutional Democratic Party	8,180	0.20	0	0
National Progressive Force	7,623	0.19	0	0
Country Movement for All	7,575	0.18	0	New
People's Democratic Party	7,037	0.17	0	0
Green Socialist Party	5,910	0.14	0	New
National Citizen Will Party	4,268	0.10	0	0
Total	4,120,028	100.00	32	0
Valid votes	4,120,028	96.77		
Invalid/blank votes	137,410	3.23		
Total votes	4,257,438	100.00		
Registered voters/turnout	8,145,548	52.27		
Source: JCE

=== Chamber of Deputies ===
The Modern Revolutionary Party won a supermajority in the Chamber of Deputies, the first time a political party achieved this in modern Dominican history.

Party	Votes	%	Seats	+/–
Modern Revolutionary Party	2,065,198	48.39	134	+48
People's Force	731,232	17.13	27	+24
Dominican Liberation Party	641,585	15.03	13	−62
Dominican Revolutionary Party	92,441	2.17	1	−3
Social Christian Reformist Party	79,337	1.86	4	−2
Dominicans for Change	55,093	1.29	2	0
Social Justice	50,855	1.19	0	New
National Unity Party	47,590	1.12	0	0
Possible Country	37,896	0.89	0	0
Revolutionary Social Democratic Party	35,117	0.82	3	+2
Civic Renovation Party	33,774	0.79	1	0
Democratic Choice	31,445	0.74	0	New
Dominican Humanist Party	30,030	0.70	0	−1
Country Alliance	29,608	0.69	1	−1
Alternative Democratic Movement	27,646	0.65	0	0
Social Democratic Institutional Bloc	26,885	0.63	0	−2
First the People Party	25,648	0.60	0	New
Generation of Servants	23,121	0.54	0	New
Liberal Reformist Party	23,113	0.54	1	0
Alliance for Democracy	22,884	0.54	0	−2
Democratic Hope Party	19,579	0.46	0	New
Independent Revolutionary Party	18,578	0.44	0	0
Liberal Action Party	16,582	0.39	0	0
Quisqueyano Christian Democratic Party	16,533	0.39	1	0
Broad Front	13,619	0.32	0	−3
People's Democratic Party	12,458	0.29	0	0
Christian People's Party	11,974	0.28	0	0
Christian Democratic Union	10,608	0.25	0	0
Christian Socialist Party	10,041	0.24	1	+1
Green Socialist Party	9,069	0.21	0	New
Institutional Democratic Party	6,298	0.15	0	0
National Citizen Will Party	4,722	0.11	1	+1
County Movement for All	4,310	0.10	0	New
National Progressive Force	2,885	0.07	0	0
Total	4,267,754	100.00	190	0
Valid votes	4,267,754	96.81		
Invalid/blank votes	140,736	3.19		
Total votes	4,408,490	100.00		
Registered voters/turnout	8,145,548	54.12		
Source: JCE

=== Central American Parliament ===
Party	Votes	%	Seats
Modern Revolutionary Party	2,223,170	54.14	12
People's Force	870,241	21.19	4
Dominican Liberation Party	842,008	20.50	4
Possible Country	35,993	0.88	0
Country Alliance	27,307	0.66	0
Generation of Servants	25,097	0.61	0
Alliance for Democracy	22,235	0.54	0
Revolutionary Social Democratic Party	21,518	0.52	0
Democratic Choice	19,043	0.46	0
Democratic Hope Party	12,337	0.30	0
Country Movement for All	7,575	0.18	0
Total	4,106,524	100.00	20
Registered voters/turnout	8,145,548	–	
Source: JCE (RESOLUCIÓN NO. 42-2024), JCE

== Aftermath ==
Both Leonel Fernandez and Abel Martínez conceded to Abinader shortly after the release of the result. In his victory speech, Abinader said that the "changes that we’ve made are going to be irreversible”, adding that the "best is yet to come".

Re-elected President Abinader, after obtaining a supermajority in both houses, announced a constitutional reform.
