= 2016 Dominican Republic general election =

Election in the Dominican Republic

- 15 May 2016
- Registered: 6,765,245
- Presidential election
- Turnout: 69.60% (▼0.63pp)
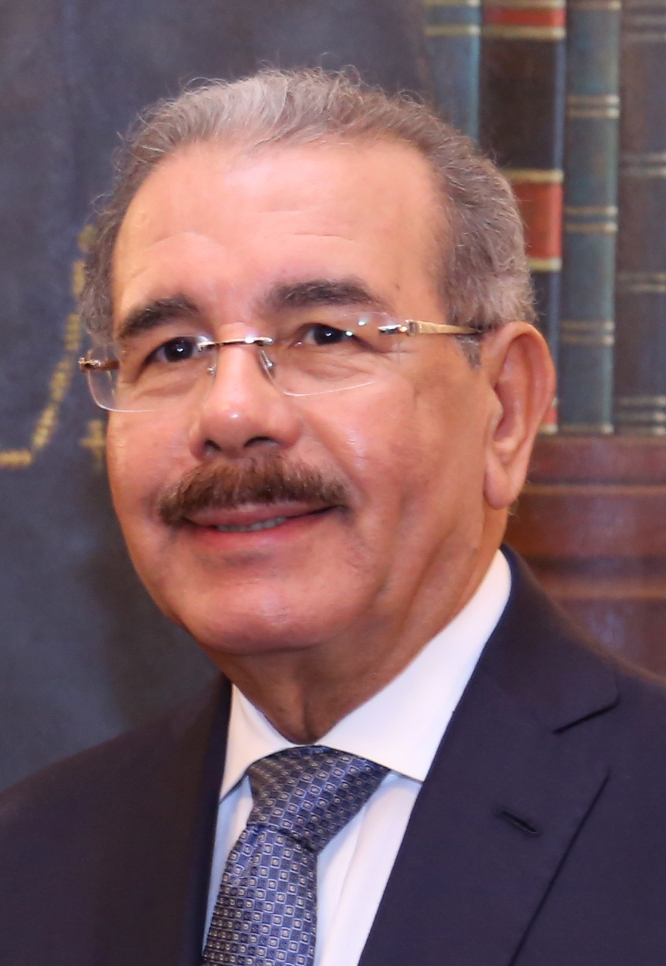

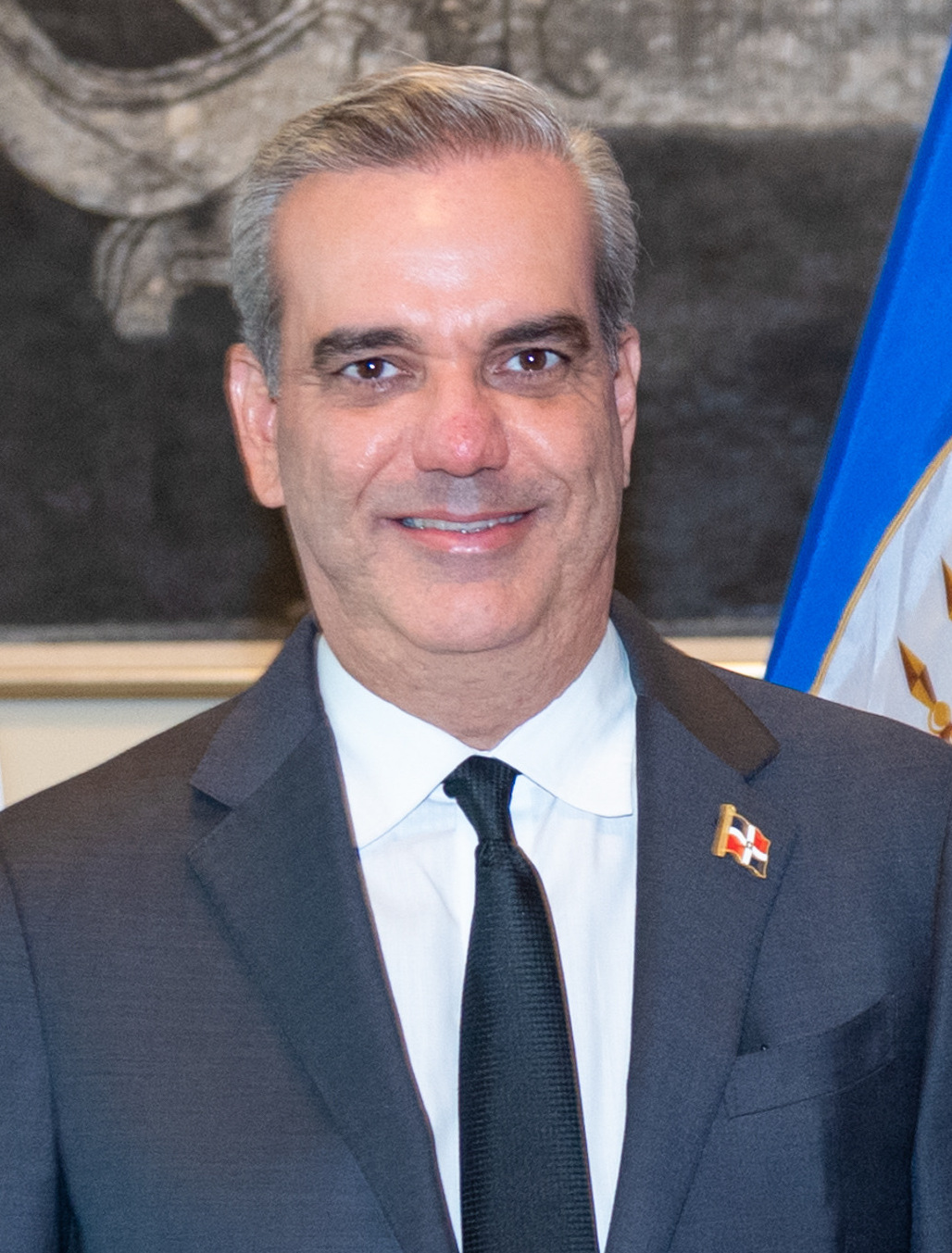
Candidate	Danilo Medina	Luis Abinader
Party	PLD	PRM
Running mate	Margarita Cedeño	Carolina Mejía
Popular vote	2,847,438	1,613,222
Percentage	61.74%	34.98%
- Presidential results by province
President before election
Danilo Medina
PLD
Elected President
Danilo Medina
PLD

General elections were held in Dominican Republic on 15 May 2016 to elect a president, vice-president and the Congress, as well as 20 deputies to the Central American Parliament, municipal councils, mayors and vice mayors. On 15 May 2015 Roberto Rosario, president of the Central Electoral Board, said that there would be about 4,300 seats up for election in the "most complex elections in history".

== Background ==
The previous parliamentary elections were held in 2010, and fresh elections would have usually been due in 2014 as Congress has a four-year term. However, in an effort to revert to the pre-1996 system and synchronize the dates of presidential and parliamentary and local elections in a single electoral year, the congressional term starting in 2010 was exceptionally extended to six years in order for the next congressional and municipal elections to be held alongside the next presidential elections due in 2016.

On 19 April 2015 the political committee of the ruling Dominican Liberation Party decided, without consensus, to amend the constitution to allow a president to be re-elected once, allowing incumbent President Danilo Medina to be presented for re-election, based on his high poll ratings. This led to tensions between party members and leaders, especially amongst supporters of Leonel Fernandez who was a pre-candidate for the elections. There was also an impasse in the Senate and Chamber of Deputies, where senators and representatives close to Fernandez stated that they would not vote in favour of the Act to Call the Revising National Assembly to amend the constitution. After several weeks of internal disputes, the political committee, including Fernandez and Medina, agreed on 28 May to vote for the amendment. The amendment passed the Chamber on June 2.

== Electoral system ==
The president was elected using the two-round system; if no candidate had received more than 50% plus 1 of the vote, a second-round runoff would have been held in June 2016. Presidents are limited to serving two consecutive terms of four years.

In the Congress, the 190 members of the Chamber of Deputies were elected in three groups; 178 were elected using proportional representation from 32 multi-member constituencies based on the 31 provinces and the Distrito Nacional, with the number of seats based on the population of each province. A further seven were elected by proportional representation in a separate constituency for expatriates and five allocated nationally to parties that received at least 1% of the vote, with preference given to those that did not win any of the 178 constituency seats. The 32 members of the Senate were elected from the 31 provinces and the Distrito Nacional using first-past-the-post voting.

== Coalitions ==
The coalition led by the Dominican Liberation Party includes:

- Dominican Revolutionary Party
- Alternative Democratic Movement
- Social Democratic Institutional Bloc
- Civic Renovation Party
- Liberal Reformist Party
- Green Socialist Party
- Christian Democratic Union
- Dominican Workers' Party
- Institutional Democratic Party
- Christian People's Party
- Liberal Party of Action
- People's Democratic Party
- Citizen's Will National Party
- Independent Revolutionary Party

The coalition led by the Modern Revolutionary Party includes:

- Social Christian Reformist Party
- Dominican Humanist Party
- Broad Front
- Dominicans for Change

== Results ==
=== President ===
Candidate	Party	Votes	%
Danilo Medina	Dominican Liberation Party and allies	2,847,438	61.74
Luis Abinader	Modern Revolutionary Party and allies	1,613,222	34.98
Guillermo Moreno García	Country Alliance	84,399	1.83
Elías Wessin	Quisqueyano Christian Democratic Party	20,423	0.44
Pelegrín Castillo	National Progressive Force	16,283	0.35
Minou Tavárez Mirabal	Alliance for Democracy	16,256	0.35
Hatuey de Camps	Revolutionary Social Democratic Party	8,264	0.18
Soraya Aquino	National Unity Party	5,678	0.12
Total		4,611,963	100.00
Valid votes		4,611,963	97.94
Invalid/blank votes		96,783	2.06
Total votes		4,708,746	100.00
Registered voters/turnout		6,765,245	69.60
Source: JCE

=== Congress ===
Party	Votes	%	Seats			
Party	Votes	%	House	+/–	Senate	+/–
Dominican Liberation Party	1,794,325	41.79	106	+10	26	–2
Modern Revolutionary Party	877,101	20.43	42	New	2	New
Social Christian Reformist Party	393,125	9.16	18	+7	1	–3
Dominican Revolutionary Party	336,201	7.83	16	–61	1	+1
National Unity Party	135,866	3.16	0	0	0	0
Alternative Democratic Movement	91,222	2.12	1	0	0	0
Social Democratic Institutional Bloc	90,516	2.11	0	–1	1	+1
Country Alliance	63,073	1.47	1	New	0	New
Quisqueyano Christian Democratic Party	57,786	1.35	1	+1	0	0
Dominican Humanist Party	55,531	1.29	0	0	0	0
Civic Renovation Party	48,689	1.13	0	0	0	0
Broad Front	45,310	1.06	1	0	0	0
Dominicans for Change	38,030	0.89	0	0	0	0
National Progressive Force	37,197	0.87	0	–1	0	0
Liberal Reformist Party	30,503	0.71	3	+3	1	+1
Green Socialist Party	24,823	0.58	0	0	0	0
Christian Democratic Union	23,765	0.55	0	0	0	0
Dominican Workers' Party	21,457	0.50	0	0	0	0
Institutional Democratic Party	20,845	0.49	0	0	0	0
Revolutionary Social Democratic Party	20,323	0.47	0	0	0	0
Christian People's Party	19,374	0.45	1	0	0	0
Alliance for Democracy	18,277	0.43	0	–1	0	0
Liberal Party of Action	16,562	0.39	0	0	0	0
People's Democratic Party	11,988	0.28	0	0	0	0
National Citizen Will Party	10,507	0.24	0	0	0	0
Independent Revolutionary Party	10,262	0.24	0	0	0	0
Present Youth Movement	571	0.01	0	New	0	New
Total	4,293,229	100.00	190	0	32	0
Valid votes	4,293,229	95.67				
Invalid/blank votes	194,516	4.33				
Total votes	4,487,745	100.00				
Registered voters/turnout	6,380,722	70.33				
Source: JCE
