= 2020 Dominican Republic general election =

- 5 July 2020
- Presidential election
- Turnout: 55.29% (▼14.31pp)
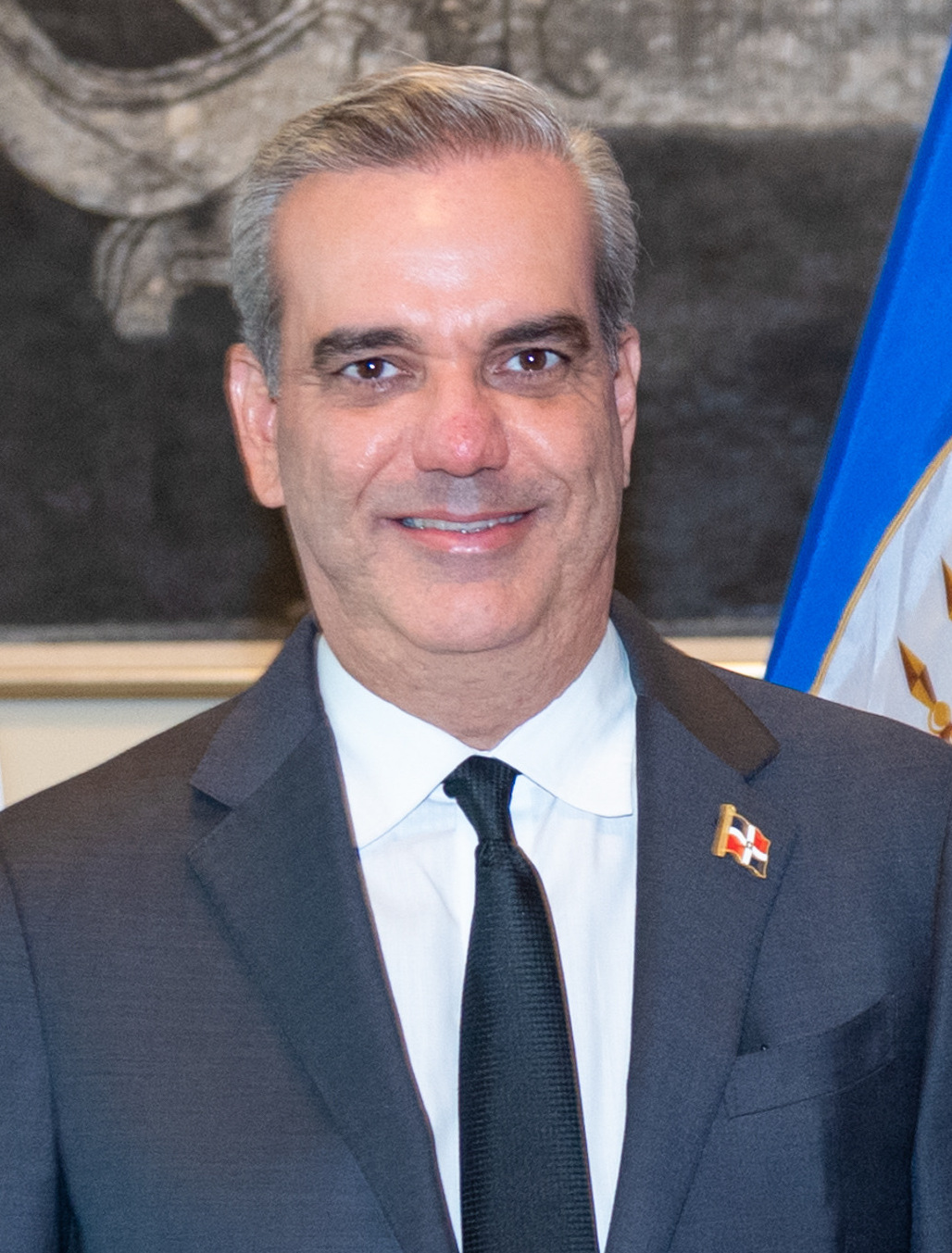

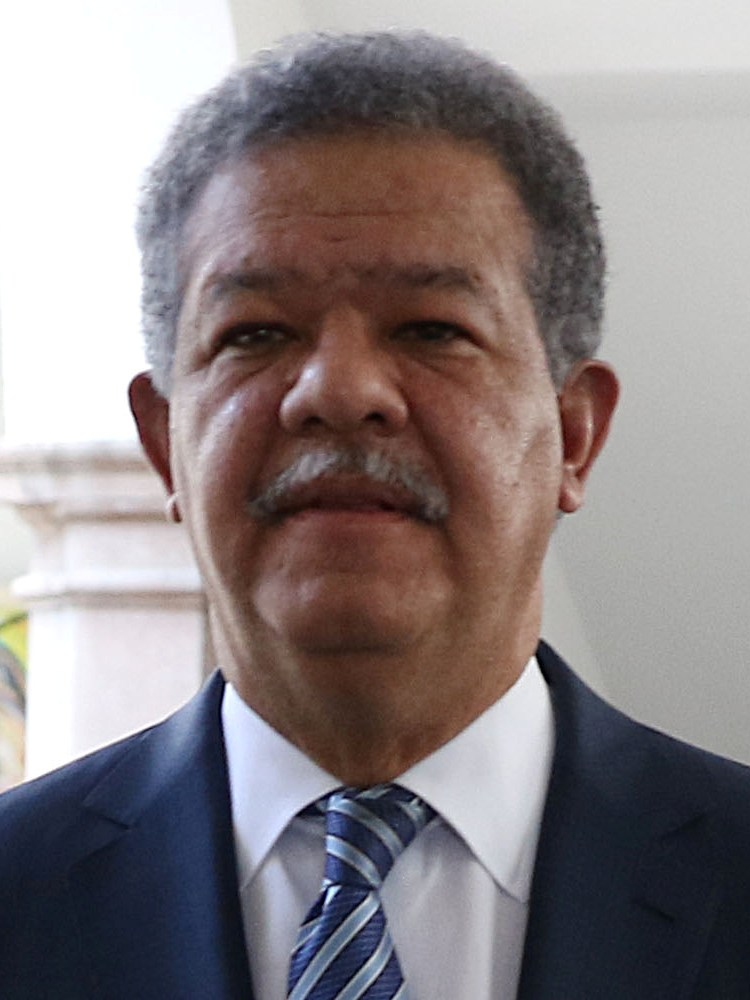
Nominee	Luis Abinader	Gonzalo Castillo	Leonel Fernández
Party	PRM	PLD	FP
Running mate	Raquel Peña	Margarita Cedeño	Sergia de Séliman
Popular vote	2,154,866	1,537,078	365,226
Percentage	52.52%	37.46%	8.90%
- Presidential election results by district
President before election
Danilo Medina
PLD
Elected President
Luis Abinader
PRM

General elections were held in the Dominican Republic on 5 July 2020 to elect a president, vice-president, 32 senators and 190 deputies. They had originally been planned for 17 May, but were postponed due to the coronavirus pandemic. They were the second elections since 1994 in which all positions were elected simultaneously, and the first in Dominican history in which all authorities were elected simultaneously and directly.

Incumbent President Danilo Medina was ineligible to stand for re-election, having served two consecutive terms since 2012. The governing Dominican Liberation Party's 16-year rule ended after Modern Revolutionary Party candidate Luis Abinader received a majority of the vote. Rival candidates Gonzalo Castillo and Leonel Fernández also conceded defeat. The Modern Revolutionary Party also won a majority of seats in the Senate and a plurality in the Chamber of Deputies. The election was a partial realignment, with the Modern Revolutionary Party entering a status as a major party in the country, replacing the Dominican Revolutionary Party, which saw a second consecutive poor election result and had obtained the lowest total vote share and seat count in its history. Abinader was inaugurated on 16 August.

== Electoral system ==
The President of the Dominican Republic is elected using the two-round system; if no candidate receives 50% + 1 vote, or more, of the total votes, a second-round runoff will be held between the two candidates with the highest votes on the first round.

The 32 members of the Senate are elected from the 31 provinces and the Distrito Nacional using first-past-the-post voting.

The 190 members of the Chamber of Deputies are elected in three groups; 178 are elected by proportional representation from 32 multi-member constituencies based on the 31 provinces and the Distrito Nacional, with the number of seats based on the population of each province. A further seven members are elected by proportional representation by Dominican expatriates in 3 overseas constituencies, and five seats are allocated at the national level to parties that received at least 1% of the vote nationally, giving preference to those that did not win any of the 178 constituency seats.

The 20 seats in the Central American Parliament are elected by proportional representation.

== Presidential candidates ==
Party	Presidential candidate	Vice presidential candidate
Dominican Liberation Party (PLD)	Gonzalo Castillo	Margarita Cedeño
Modern Revolutionary Party (PRM)	Luis Abinader	Raquel Peña
Fuerza del Pueblo (FP)	Leonel Fernández	Sergia Elena Mejía
Alianza País (ALPAÍS)	Guillermo Moreno García	Agustín González Morel
National Citizen Will Party (PNVC)	Juan Cohen	Hugo McFarlane Kaluche
Partido Demócrata Institucional (PDI)	Ismael Reyes Cruz	Frank Gene Troncoso Haché

== Opinion polls ==
=== President ===
Pollster	Date(s)	Castillo (PLD)	Abinader (PRM)	Fernandez (FP)	Moreno (ALPAIS)
Centro Económico del Cibao	11–13 Oct 2019	29.7%	43.7%	23.6%	—N/a
Centro Económico del Cibao	3–5 Nov 2019	31%	42.9%	18.4%	1.9%
Centro Economico del Cibao	29 Nov –1 Dec 2019	25.6%	46.6%	24.4%	—N/a
Pool Logistic SRL	1–5 Dec 2019	49%	36%	3.9%	—N/a
Ideame	3–10 Dec 2019	31.8%	47.5%	18.3%	—N/a
ABC Marketing	10–14 Dec 2019	22.6%	47.3%	20.9%	—N/a
Sigma Dos	15–17 Dec 2019	39.9%	35%	8%	—N/a
Mark Penn/Stagwell	8–10 Jan 2020	28%	43%	19%	—N/a
Gallup-RD	16–21 Jan 2020	31.4%	42.2%	15.5%	1.2%
Gallup-Hoy	16–21 Jan 2020	31.7%	44.9%	19.3%	—N/a
CIES International	31 Jan–2 Feb 2020	35%	37%	11%	3%
Greenberg-Diario Libre	21–24 Feb 2020	24%	52%	17%	2%
CIES International	23–25 Feb 2020	28.8%	43.7%	12.6%	6.4%
CIMERAN<	28–29 Feb 2020	25%	52.5%	17.5%	3.5%
Centro Económico del Cibao	28 Feb–5 Mar 2020	21.0%	55.1%	15.6%	—N/a
Sigma Dos	2–7 Apr 2020	38.8%	36.6%	9.6%	—N/a
Horizon Research LLC	7 Apr 2020	23.6%	43.9%	31.2%	—N/a
Global Trend Research	12–15 Apr 2020	22.9%	43.1%	30.4%	0.8%
ASISA	13–19 Apr 2020	20.4%	44%	29.1%	—N/a
JB Consulting Group	14–20 Apr 2020	46.6%	31.1%	3.6%	—N/a
APD Consulting Group	17–20 Apr 2020	24.1%	54.4%	11.8%	4.6%
CIES International	17–20 Apr 2020	33%	39%	9%	4%
Centro Economico del Cibao	18–19 Apr 2020	23.7%	53.4%	7.3%	1%
Polimetrics	22–25 Apr 2020	40.8%	38.3%	9.3%	1.9%
CID Latinoamericana	22–23 Apr 2020	40%	38%	8%	—N/a
New Partners	23–26 Apr 2020	27.4%	52.1%	9.9%	2.1%
Market Reports	25–27 Apr 2020	22.4%	42.8%	31.2%	—N/a
Mercado & Cuantificaciones	27–29 Apr 2020	30.3%	52.3%	12.3%	1.7%
GIDL	26 Apr–1 May 2020	23.2%	41.9%	32.4%	—N/a
Datamarket	1–3 May 2020	26%	46%	21%	2%
Horizon Research LCC	3–7 May 2020	22.8%	41.3%	33.5%	—N/a
Effective Project Communications	4–7 May 2020	29%	49%	16%	3%
Polimetric	4–9 May 2020	40.4%	37.7%	8.8%	—N/a
Centro Economico del Cibao	11–12 May 2020	35.2%	53.9%	9.5%	—N/a
ABC Marketing	13–16 May 2020	26.5%	55.6%	14.5%	—N/a
SISGLO	17–20 May 2020	24.1%	40.6%	33.8%	—N/a
Centro Economico del Cibao	18–19 May 2020	34.6%	53.3%	9.9%	2.2%
Elections & Proyect Corp	20–22 May 2020	21.8%	42.1%	33.9%	—N/a
IDEAME	18–23 May 2020	31.5%	51.8%	14.3%	1%
José Dorín Cabrera Mercadología	21–23 May 2020	46.9%	36.7%	9.5%	2.2%
Mark Penn/Stagwell	20–25 May 2020	37%	39%	10%	—N/a
APD Consulting Group	21–25 May 2020	34.4%	51.6%	11.6%	2.3%
CID Latinoamericana	23–24 May 2020	41%	39%	10%	3%
ASISA	13–19 Apr 2020	20.4%	44%	29.1%	—N/a
Centro Economico del Cibao	25–26 May 2020	34.0%	53.5%	10.3%	2.1%
CIES International	24–27 May 2020	29%	52%	10%	6%
CYGNAL	26 May–2 Jun 2020	28.2%	54.6%	13.9%	3.4%
Mercado & Cuantificaciones	28–30 May 2020	33%	51.3%	11.2%	1.1%
Datamarket	26–30 May 2020	27%	44%	21%	2%
Polimetrics	30–31 May 2020	40.7%	37.5%	8.5%	2.6%
GIDL	1–3 Jun 2020	21.5%	40.7%	33.4%	1.7%
Mercado & Cuantificaciones	2–5 Jun 2020	34.5%	52.1%	8.2%	—N/a
New Partners	2–5 Jun 2020	29.5%	50.7%	11.4%	—N/a
Global Trend Research	4–6 Jun 2020	25.7%	40.3%	30.8%	—N/a
Gavindian Polsters	4–8 Jun 2020	38%	52%	9%	1%
Ideame	5–9 Jun 2020	34.4%	52.5%	10.9%	0.9%
Centro de Innovación y Políticas Públicas	6–9 Jun 2020	36.3%	52.3%	7.7%	1%
CID Latinoamericana	9–11 Jun 2020	43%	44%	9%	1%
Consulting and Field International	9–12 Jun 2020	43%	40%	9%	2%
Sigma Dos	12–14 Jun 2020	43.6%	40.4%	10.1%	1.9%
John Zogby Strategies	12–14 Jun 2020	34%	54%	9%	2%
Datamarket	12–14 Jun 2020	32%	43%	17%	2%
Greenberg-Diario Libre	11–16 Jun 2020	29%	56%	12%	1%
Gallup	12–16 Jun 2020	35.5%	53.7%	8.6%	1.3%
Mercado y Cuantificaciones	15–17 Jun 2020	33.5%	55.8%	7.0%	0.3%
PoliRD	16–18 Jun 2020	45.1%	41.7%	9.8%	1.8%
ABC Marketing	15–20 Jun 2020	32.6%	54.8%	10.4%	—N/a
Market Reports	18–21 Jun 2020	26.2%	40.8%	30.6%	—N/a
Polismetrics	20–25 Jun 2020	42.9%	39.2%	9.6%	1.8%
Emevenca	20–23 Jun 2020	41%	46%	8%	2%
Mark Penn /Stagwell-SIN	16–23 Jun 2020	35%	47%	11%	—N/a
GIDL	21–23 Jun 2020	23.8%	43%	29.7%	1.2%
Centro Economico del Cibao	22–23 Jun 2020	33.4%	55.2%	9.7%	1.7%
NewPartners	24–25 Jun 2020	29%	54%	10%	—N/a

=== Party identification and Congress ===
Pollster	Date(s)	PLD	PRM	FP	PRSC	PRD	ALPAIS	N/A	Others
CIES International	19–22 Sep 2019	31%	33%	—N/a	3.3%	1.2%	4.7%	15.6%	12.2%
Gallup-Hoy	16–21 Jan 2020	37.5%	43.3%	8.5%	—N/a	—N/a	0.1%	7.6%	2.9%
CIES International	23–25 Feb 2020	27.5%	43.6%	10%	3.8%	1.3%	2.5%	11.3%	—N/a
Makert Reports	25–27 Apr 2020	29.1%	34.7%	19.1%	3.6%	2.3%	—N/a	6.8%	4.2%
Datamarket	1–3 May 2020	27%	37%	7%	6%	4%	2%	6%	11%
Effective Project Comunications	4–7 May 2020	32%	44%	8%	6%	4%	1%	2%	3%
José Dorín Cabrera Mercadología	21–23 May 2020	34.2%	23.2%	8.4%	—N/a	—N/a	0.5%	30.1%	3.6%
CID Latinoamericana	23–24 May 2020	45%	38%	6%	—N/a	—N/a	—N/a	—N/a	—N/a
Datamarket	26–30 May 2020	27%	37%	7%	6%	4%	2%	6%	11%
CYGNAL	26 May–2 Jun 2020	26.7%	40.5%	9.5%	—N/a	—N/a	—N/a	—N/a	—N/a
Polimetrics	30–31 May 2020	35.4%	29.9%	8.9%	0.9%	—N/a	—N/a	25.7%	9.2%
CID Latinoamerica	9–11 Jun 2020	43%	40%	7%	1%	2%	1%	5%	1%
Mercados y Cuantificaciones	15–17 Jun 2020	34%	47.8%	5.3%	1.1%	1.1%	0.4%	9.3%	1%
ABC Marketing	15–20 Jun 2020	29.8%	46.7%	12.3%	3.1%	6.0%	—N/a	—N/a	—N/a
Market Reports	18–21 Jun 2020	27.3%	33.2%	22.2%	3.6%	2.3%	—N/a	6.8%	4.6%
GIDL	21–23 Jun 2020	23.7%	34.7%	21.7%	4.2%	1.3%	—N/a	8.2%	—N/a
NewPartners	24–25 Jun 2020	28%	50%	6%	0%	1%	1%	13%	1%

== Conduct ==
It was initially reported that representatives of the Organization of American States (OAS) would arrive to the Dominican Republic on 13 February 2020 to monitor the elections. The general election to elect the President and members of the Dominican Republic parliament, which was postponed from the scheduled 17 May 2020 date due to the COVID-19 pandemic, was later held on 5 July 2020.

Local media reported that the elections proceeded smoothly, except for one incident, when a person was shot inside a polling station after an argument erupted between rival party supporters.

== Results ==
=== President ===
Luis Abinader won the presidential election in the first round, receiving over 50% of the vote. During the election count, the ruling Dominican Liberation Party's candidate Gonzalo Castillo conceded defeat, stating that the official count "shows that there is an irreversible trend and that from now on we have a president-elect... Our congratulations to Mr Luis Abinader." Former President Leonel Fernández, who left the ruling party and ran for the presidency as a member of the People's Force party, also conceded defeat. Abinader was sworn in as President of the Dominican Republic on 16 August 2020.

Candidate	Party	Votes	%
Luis Abinader	Modern Revolutionary Party and allies (Note: Revolutionary Social Democratic Party, Dominican Humanist Party, Alliance for Democracy, País Posible, Broad Front and Dominicans for Change)	2,154,866	52.51
Gonzalo Castillo	Dominican Liberation Party and allies (Note: Alternative Democratic Movement, Christian Democratic Union, Civic Renovation Party, People's Democratic Party, Independent Revolutionary Party and the Dominican Revolutionary Party)	1,537,078	37.46
Leonel Fernández	People's Force and allies (Note: Social Christian Reformist Party, Social Democratic Institutional Bloc, National Unity Party, National Progressive Force and the Quisqueyano Christian Democratic Party)	365,226	8.90
Guillermo Moreno García	Country Alliance	39,458	0.96
Ismael Reyes Cruz	Institutional Democratic Party	3,484	0.08
Juan Cohen	National Citizen Will Party	3,250	0.08
Total		4,103,362	100.00
Valid votes		4,103,362	98.56
Invalid/blank votes		59,943	1.44
Total votes		4,163,305	100.00
Registered voters/turnout		7,529,932	55.29
Source: JCE

=== Senate ===
The Modern Revolutionary Party won an absolute majority in the Senate on their own, seeing their seat total increase by 15, while the ruling Dominican Liberation party lost over 75% of their prior seats.

Party	Votes	%	Seats	+/–
Modern Revolutionary Party	1,768,588	45.24	17	+15
Dominican Liberation Party	1,267,168	32.41	6	–20
People's Force	141,836	3.63	1	New
Social Christian Reformist Party	116,353	2.98	6	+5
Dominican Revolutionary Party	111,476	2.85	0	–1
National Unity Party	55,057	1.41	0	0
Country Alliance	54,209	1.39	0	0
Dominicans for Change	48,365	1.24	1	+1
Social Democratic Institutional Bloc	48,124	1.23	1	0
Civic Renovation Party	36,030	0.92	0	0
Alternative Democratic Movement	27,745	0.71	0	0
Liberal Reformist Party	25,276	0.65	0	–1
Broad Front	24,863	0.64	0	0
Revolutionary Social Democratic Party	23,093	0.59	0	0
Alliance for Democracy	20,868	0.53	0	0
Christian People's Party	18,817	0.48	0	0
Quisqueyano Christian Democratic Party	17,125	0.44	0	0
Dominican Humanist Party	15,963	0.41	0	0
Liberal Action Party	14,537	0.37	0	0
National Progressive Force	14,485	0.37	0	0
Christian Democratic Union	12,392	0.32	0	0
Possible Country	11,136	0.28	0	New
Independent Revolutionary Party	9,628	0.25	0	0
People's Democratic Party	9,568	0.24	0	0
Institutional Democratic Party	8,971	0.23	0	0
National Citizen Will Party	7,651	0.20	0	0
Total	3,909,324	100.00	32	0
Valid votes	3,909,324	97.01		
Invalid/blank votes	120,562	2.99		
Total votes	4,029,886	100.00		
Registered voters/turnout	6,934,053	58.12		
Source: JCE (votes) JCE (seats) Ganadores Elecciones Julio 2020

=== Chamber of Deputies ===
The Modern Revolutionary Party won a plurality of votes and seats, seeing their seat count more than double. The ruling Dominican Liberation Party lost nearly 30% of their prior seats. No party has a majority on their own in the Chamber, meaning alliances or coalitions will need to be made to guarantee the passage of bills. A total of 96 seats is needed for a majority.

Party	Votes	%	Seats	+/–
Modern Revolutionary Party	1,634,860	40.84	86	+44
Dominican Liberation Party	1,261,802	31.52	75	–31
Dominican Revolutionary Party	220,939	5.52	4	–12
People's Force	170,993	4.27	3	New
Social Christian Reformist Party	165,800	4.14	6	–12
Country Alliance	71,899	1.80	2	+1
Dominicans for Change	45,162	1.13	2	+2
Dominican Humanist Party	42,597	1.06	1	+1
Civic Renovation Party	39,589	0.99	1	+1
Social Democratic Institutional Bloc	37,235	0.93	2	+2
Revolutionary Social Democratic Party	33,362	0.83	1	+1
Alternative Democratic Movement	32,723	0.82	0	–1
Broad Front	30,429	0.76	3	+2
National Unity Party	27,600	0.69	0	0
Alliance for Democracy	26,570	0.66	2	+2
Christian People's Party	20,894	0.52	0	–1
Quisqueyano Christian Democratic Party	19,414	0.48	1	0
Christian Democratic Union	18,199	0.45	0	0
Liberal Action Party	17,655	0.44	0	0
Liberal Reformist Party	15,652	0.39	1	–2
Possible Country	15,346	0.38	0	New
National Citizen Will Party	12,517	0.31	0	0
Independent Revolutionary Party	12,368	0.31	0	0
National Progressive Force	10,959	0.27	0	0
People's Democratic Party	10,598	0.26	0	0
Institutional Democratic Party	7,997	0.20	0	0
Total	4,003,159	100.00	190	0
Valid votes	4,003,159	96.34		
Invalid/blank votes	151,946	3.66		
Total votes	4,155,105	100.00		
Registered voters/turnout	7,529,932	55.18		
Source: JCE, JCE
