= Congress of the Dominican Republic =

Bicameral legislature of the Dominican Republic

Congress of the Dominican Republic Congreso de la República Dominicana (Spanish)
- 2nd Ordinary Legislative Session of 2026
- Coat of arms of the Dominican Republic

Type
- Type: Bicameral
- Houses: Senate; Chamber of Deputies
- Established: November 6, 1844; 182 years ago

Leadership
- President of the Senate: Ricardo De Los Santos Polanco (PRM) since 16 August 2023
- President of the Chamber of Deputies: Alfredo Pacheco Osoria (PRM) since 16 August 2020

Structure
- Seats: 222 (Note: 31 senators by province and 1 senator for Distrito Nacional and 178 territorial deputies, 5 national deputies, and 7 overseas deputies.) consisting of: 32 Senators; 190 Deputies
- Senate political groups: Government (28) (PRM and allies): PRM (26); PRSC (1); PPG (1); Opposition (4): FP (3); Independent (1)
- Chamber of Deputies political groups: Government (146) (PRM and allies): PRM (140); PRSC (1); DxC (2); ALPAÍS (1); PCR (1); PLR (1); Opposition (44): FP (28) (FP and allies); PLD (13) (PLD and allies); PRD (1) (PRD and allies); PQDC (1); Independent (1)
- Senate committees: 30
- Chamber of Deputies committees: 52
- Joint committees: 1
- Length of term: 4 years
- Salary: RD$320,000 (Note: The president of the Senate and Chamber of Deputies receives a monthly base salary of RD$400,000.) (monthly)

Elections
- Senate voting system: First past the post
- Chamber of Deputies voting system: Closed list proportional representation, D'Hondt method
- Last Senate election: 19 May 2024
- Last Chamber of Deputies election: 19 May 2024
- Next Senate election: 21 May 2028
- Next Chamber of Deputies election: 21 May 2028

Meeting place
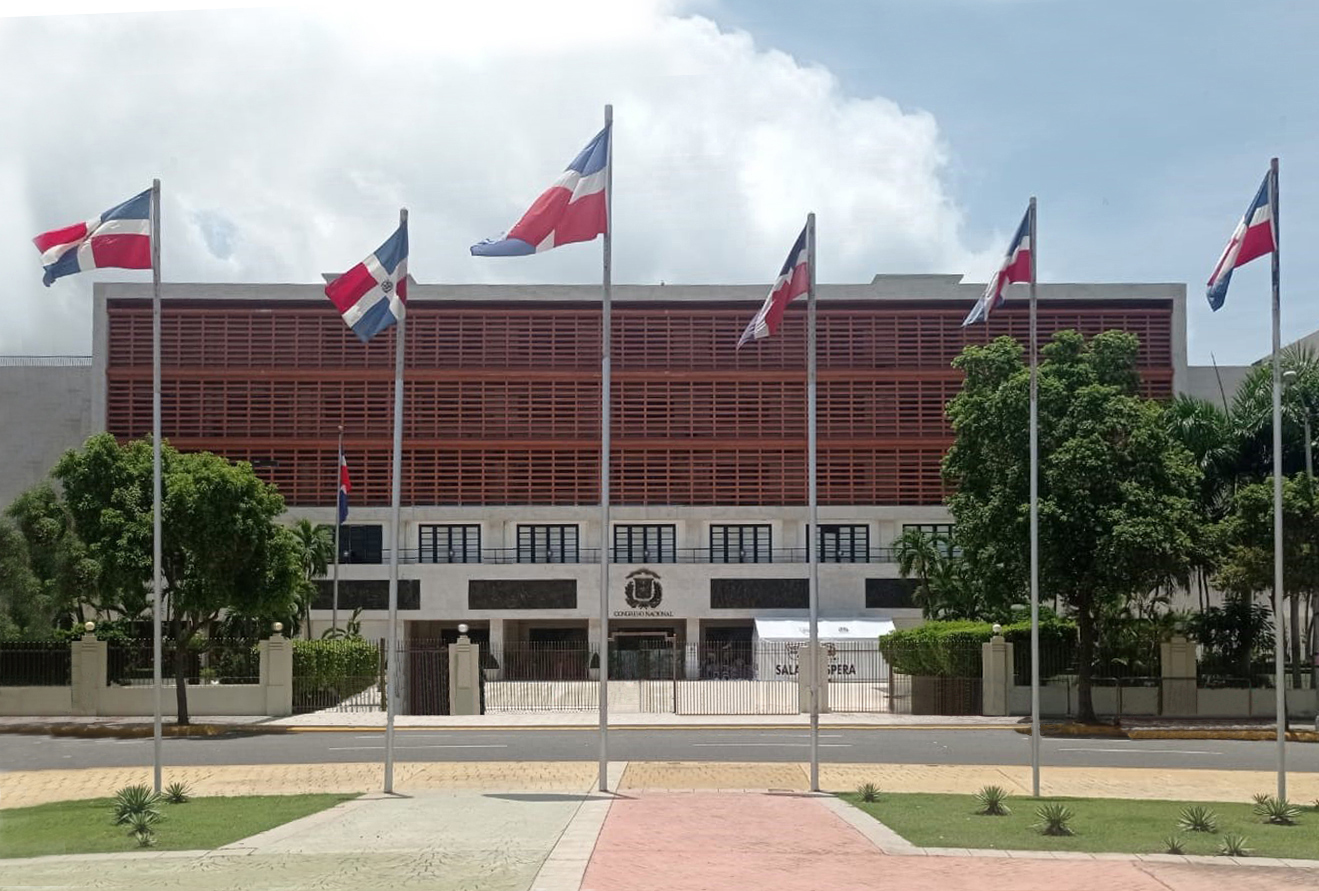
- Palace of the National Congress; Santo Domingo; Dominican Republic (2021)

Website
- www.senadord.gob.do (in Spanish) camaradediputados.gob.do (in Spanish)

Constitution
- Constitution of the Dominican Republic

The Congress of the Dominican Republic (Spanish: Congreso de la República Dominicana) is the bicameral legislature of the government of the Dominican Republic, consisting of two houses, the Senate and the Chamber of Deputies. Both senators and deputies are chosen through direct election. There are no term limits for either chamber.

As provided by the Dominican Constitution, each of the 178 members of the Chamber of Deputies represents a district and serves a four-year term. Chamber seats are apportioned among the states by population. The 32 Senators serve staggered four-year terms. Each province has one senator, regardless of population.

The Constitution vests all legislative power in the Congress. The Chamber and Senate are equal partners in the legislative process (legislation cannot be enacted without the consent of both chambers); however, the Constitution grants each chamber some unique powers. The Senate is empowered to approve treaties and presidential appointments. Revenue-raising bills must originate in the Chamber of Deputies, which also has the sole power of impeachment, while the Senate has the sole power to try impeachment cases.

The Congress meets in the Palace of Congress in Santo Domingo.

The term Congress actually refers to a particular meeting of the national legislature, reckoned according to the terms of representatives. Congressional elections are held in even numbered years divisible by four. Suffrage is universal and compulsory for all Dominican citizens aged over 18 or under that age if married.

== History ==
The Congress of the Dominican Republic was founded after the drafting of the Constitution, on 6 November 1844. In the chapter 2 of this Constitution is mentioned how the legislature would be divided into two legislative bodies called Tribunat (corresponding to the current House of Deputies) and Conservative Council (corresponding to the current Senate). Earlier, deputies and senators were elected by indirect and based on census vote and candidates could only be those with properties.

In 1854, the Constitution was amended to change the name of the Conservative Senate Council. Later, in December of the same year, a new revision to the Constitution was made to merge the two chambers in a Consultant Senate, being the first period in the history of the Dominican Republic in which the legislature was governed by a unicameral Congress. The bicameral system was again replaced in November 1865 after the Restoration of the Republic, separating the Congress in a House of Representatives and House of Representatives.

Between 1866 and 1907, the Dominican Republic is disputed between bicameral and unicameral, eliminating the Senate in the constitutional amendment of 1866, restoring it in 1878, and returning it to eliminate in 1880. The Senate reappeared as house of Congress in the Constitution of 1908, from which the bicameral system remained constant. During the first US intervention, Congress was dissolved not before elected president Francisco Henriquez y Carvajal. After the restoration of national sovereignty, Congress was again restored, and in 1927 the election of legislators were allowed by direct vote.

With the rise of Rafael Leonidas Trujillo to power, the Congress became a cover for his political ambitions. In 1935, Trujillo was appointed by the Congress president for life, instituted on January 11 of each year as the Day of the Benefactor, and renamed the capital city Ciudad Trujillo. In 1941, Congress recognized the civil rights of women, allowing women to vote in the country.

After Trujillo's death, and after deposition of the constitutional government of Juan Bosch in 1963, Congress was dissolved by the Triumvirate. On 25 April 1965 a military group seeking to restore the Constitution of 1963 and replace the president Bosch entered the National Palace and made capitulate to Triumvirate, after which the newly restored Congress was sworn in as provisional president to the President of the Chamber of Deputies Jose Rafael Molina Ureña. However, President Urena had to resign two days later and applied for asylum. At this, the Congress appointed provisional president Francisco Alberto Caamaño Deñó, who took office on May 4 in front of a crowd at Independence Park.

After the second US intervention, and after the new constitutional government elected in 1966, under the presidency of Joaquín Balaguer, Congress made the longest constitutional reform of all constitutional reforms. This Constitution was amended in 1994 to prohibit presidential re-election and separate congressional and presidential elections (which had been held together since the reform of 1927) with 2 years apart.

Congress passed a constitutional amendment in May 2002, to restore the limitation of only 2 consecutive reelections. During the election of President of the Chamber of Deputies on 16 August 2003, there was a shooting inside the room of the legislative chamber.

Later in the constitutional reform of 2010, Congress passed a non-consecutive presidential reelection law, and rejoined the congressional and presidential elections, which are exceptionally extended the term of elected legislators in 2010 from 4 to 6 years until 2016.

=== Reviewing and guiding the executive ===
Congress exercises its review function by means of the Speech of Accountability and inquests. The Speech of Accountability it is the responsibility of the President of the Republic to report annually, before Congress, on the budgetary, financial and management administration that occurred in the previous year, as established in article 128, paragraph 2, subparagraph f) of the Constitution, An explanatory message of the macroeconomic and fiscal projections, expected economic, financial and social results and the main priorities that the government intends to implement under the General State Budget Law approved for the current year. The Constitution also contemplate that Congress should receive reports from the Chamber of Account, the Ministries and the Ombudsman.

=== Inquests ===
The legislative chambers, as well as the permanent and special commissions which they constitute, may invite ministers, vice ministers, directors and other civil servants of the Public Administration, as well as any natural or legal person, to provide pertinent information on matters of Which are empowered.

The reluctance of the persons cited to appear or to render the required declarations, can be sanctioned by the criminal courts of the Republic with the penalty indicated by the current legal provisions for cases of contempt of public authorities, at the request of the corresponding chamber.

To question ministers and vice ministers, the Governor of the Central Bank and the directors or administrators of autonomous and decentralized agencies of the State, as well as those of entities that administer public funds on matters within their competence, when agreed by the majority of members Present, at the request of at least three legislators, as well as to obtain information from other public officials competent in the matter and dependent on the previous ones. If the said official or official does not appear without justifiable cause or their statements are considered unsatisfactory, the chambers, with the vote of two thirds of their members present, may cast a vote of censure against them and recommend their dismissal from the office. President of the Republic or the corresponding hierarchical superior for breach of responsibility.

=== National Assembly and Joint sessions ===
When the Chamber and the Senate celebrate they meetings together is denominated National Assembly, the Assembly it's usually call for the Speech of Accountability and to celebrate the commemorative or protocolary acts.

To a joint session to be declare as National Assembly the plenary most have more than half of the members of each chamber present. Its decisions shall be taken by an absolute majority of votes, except when it is convened to amend the Constitution. The National Assembly or the Joint session of both chambers are governed by its rules of organization and operation. In both cases the presidency will be assume by the President of the Senate; The vice president, the President of the Chamber of Deputies and the secretariat, the secretaries of each chamber.

Its responsibility of the National Assembly:

- To know and decide on constitutional reforms, acting in this case, as a National Revisory Assembly;
- To examine the minutes of election of the President or President and of the Vice-President or Vice-President of the Republic;
- To proclaim to the President and Vice President of the Republic, receive their oath and accept or reject their resignations;
- Exercise the powers conferred by this Constitution and the organic regulation.

== Latest election ==
The latest election for the Congress was in 2024, as part of the general election.

=== Senate ===
The following table shows the results of the senatorial elections held on 19 May 2024, at the beginning of the 2024–2028 legislative period, alongside the current party composition as of November 2026.

Party	Votes	%	Seats (including allies)	+/–	Current seats (November 2026)
Modern Revolutionary Party (PRM)	1,876,246	45.54	24	+6	26
People's Force (FP)	797,059	19.35	3	+2	3
Dominican Liberation Party (PLD)	726,833	17.64	0	−6	–
Dominican Revolutionary Party (PRD)	105,227	2.55	–	–	–
Social Christian Reformist Party (PRSC)	58,691	1.42	1	−4	2
Dominicans for Change (DXC)	49,940	1.21	0	−1	–
Social Democratic Institutional Bloc (BIS)	44,858	1.09	0	−1	–
National Unity Party (PUN)	40,056	0.97	–	–	–
Justice Social Party (JS)	39,762	0.97	–	–	–
Country Possible Party (PP)	35,993	0.87	–	–	–
Alliance for Democracy (APD)	22,235	0.54	1	+1	–
Broad Front (FA)	13,504	0.33	–	–	–
Revolutionary Social Democratic Party (PRSD)	21,518	0.52	–	–	–
Civic Renovation Party (PCR)	20,405	0.50	–	–	–
Quisqueyano Christian Democratic Party (PQDC)	20,144	0.49	–	–	–
Dominican Humanist Party (PHD)	19,767	0.48	–	–	–
Democratic Choice (OD)	19,043	0.46	–	–	–
Alternative Democratic Movement (MODA)	18,961	0.46	–	–	–
People First Party (PPG)	17,631	0.43	1	+1	–
Liberal Reformist Party (PLR)	17,018	0.41	1	+1	–
National Progressive Force (FNP)	7,623	0.18	–	–	–
Esperanza Democrática Party (PED)	12,337	0.30	–	–	–
Liberal Action Party (PAL)	10,946	0.27	–	–	–
Independent Revolutionary Party (PRI)	10,674	0.26	1	+1	–
Christian Socialist Party (PSC)	9,948	0.24	–	–	–
Christian People's Party (PPC)	9,404	0.23	–	–	–
Christian Democratic Union (UDC)	8,831	0.21	–	–	–
Institutional Democratic Party (PDI)	8,180	0.20	–	–	–
Party for All (PPT)	7,575	0.18	–	–	–
People's Democratic Party (PDP)	7,037	0.17	–	–	–
Green Dominican Party (PASOVE)	5,910	0.14	–	–	–
National Citizen Will Party (PNVC)	4,268	0.10	–	–	–
Independent	–	–	–	–	1
Total valid votes	4,120,028	100.00	32	0	32
Invalid votes	137,410	–	–	–	–
Total votes cast	4,257,438	–	–	–	–
Registered voters / turnout	7,281,764	58.47	–	–	–
Note: Seats (including allies) and changes refer to the 2024 election and the 2020–2024 Senate composition. Current seats reflect party affiliation as of November 2026; subsequent changes in affiliation are not changes to the 2024 election results.
Sources: IPU Parline; IPU Parline 2020; Junta Central Electoral; Senate of the Dominican Republic.

=== Chamber of Deputies ===
The following table shows the results of the Chamber of Deputies elections held on 19 May 2024, compared with the previous legislative period (2020–2024).

Party	Votes	%	Seats	+/–
Modern Revolutionary Party (PRM)	1,983,852	48.27	140	+54
People's Force (FP)	704,834	17.15	28	+25
Dominican Liberation Party (PLD)	626,628	15.25	13	−62
Dominican Revolutionary Party (PRD)	86,976	2.12	1	−3
Social Christian Reformist Party (PRSC)	77,968	1.90	1	−5
Dominicans for Change (DXC)	53,445	1.30	2	0
Justice Social Party (JS)	49,976	1.22	0	0
National Unity Party (PUN)	45,373	1.10	0	0
Possible Country (PP)	36,567	0.89	0	0
Revolutionary Social Democratic Party (PRSD)	34,484	0.84	0	−1
Civic Renovation Party (PCR)	32,861	0.80	1	0
Democratic Choice (OD)	30,337	0.74	0	0
Dominican Humanist Party (PHD)	29,391	0.72	0	−1
Alliance for Democracy (ALPAIS)	28,420	0.69	1	−1
Alternative Democratic Movement (MODA)	27,108	0.66	0	0
People First Party (PPG)	25,096	0.61	0	0
Social Democratic Institutional Bloc (BIS)	24,816	0.60	0	−2
Green Social Party (GENS)	22,523	0.55	0	0
Liberal Reformist Party (PLR)	22,349	0.54	1	0
Alliance for Democracy (APD)	21,104	0.51	0	−2
Independent Revolutionary Party (PRI)	17,906	0.44	0	0
Liberal Action Party (PAL)	16,352	0.40	0	0
Quisqueyano Christian Democratic Party (PQDC)	15,977	0.39	1	0
Broad Front (FA)	13,079	0.32	0	−3
Esperanza Democrática Party (PED)	12,941	0.31	0	0
People's Democratic Party (PDP)	11,899	0.29	0	0
Christian People's Party (PPC)	11,405	0.28	0	0
Christian Democratic Union (UDC)	10,340	0.25	0	0
Christian Socialist Party (PSC)	9,802	0.24	0	0
Green Dominican Party (PASOVE)	8,796	0.21	0	0
Institutional Democratic Party (PDI)	6,080	0.15	0	0
National Citizen Will Party (PNVC)	4,455	0.11	0	0
Party for All (PPT)	4,310	0.10	0	0
National Progressive Force (FNP)	2,885	0.07	0	0
Independent	–	–	1	+1
Valid votes	4,110,335	100.00	190	0
Invalid votes	133,695	–	–	–
Total votes cast	4,244,030	–	–	–
Note: Seat changes are calculated against the 2020 election results. Seats are attributed to the electoral affiliation of elected deputies, rather than aggregated coalition totals.
Source: Junta Central Electoral; IPU Parline; Diario Libre.

== See also ==
- Politics of the Dominican Republic
- List of political parties in the Dominican Republic
- List of legislatures by country
