= List of political parties in the Dominican Republic =

This article lists political parties in the Dominican Republic.

The Dominican Republic has a multi-party system, with two or three strong parties and a third party that is electorally successful.

== Parties ==
=== Major parties ===
The PRM, the FP, and the PLD are considered major parties in the Dominican Republic, after the last election.

| Party | Abbr. | Founded | Ideology | Senators | Deputies | Mayors |
|---|---|---|---|---|---|---|
| Modern Revolutionary Party; Partido Revolucionario Moderno | PRM | 2014 | Social democracy | 29 / 32 | 146 / 190 | 122 / 158 |
| People's Force; Fuerza del Pueblo | FP | 2019 | Progressivism | 3 / 32 | 28 / 190 | 6 / 158 |
| Dominican Liberation Party; Partido de la Liberación Dominicana | PLD | 1973 | Progressivism | 0 / 32 | 13 / 190 | 15 / 158 |

=== Congressional parties ===
The parties listed below have at least one seat in either the Senate or the Chamber of Deputies after the 2024 general election.

| Name | Abbr. | Founded | Ideology | Senators | Deputies | Mayors |
|---|---|---|---|---|---|---|
| Democratic Hope Party; Partido Esperanza Democrática | PED | 2015 | Liberal conservatism | | 1 / 190 | |
| Dominicans for Change; Partido de los Dominicanos por el Cambio | DXC | 2010 | Green conservatism | 1 / 32 | 2 / 190 | |
| Social Democratic Institutional Bloc; Bloque Institucional Socialdemócrata | BIS | 1989 | Social democracy | 1 / 32 | 2 / 190 | 1 / 158 |
| Dominican Revolutionary Party; Partido Revolucionario Dominicano | PRD | 1939 | Social liberalism | | 4 / 190 | 3 / 158 |
| Broad Front; Frente Amplio | FA | 1992 | Socialism | | 3 / 190 | |
| Alliance for Democracy; Alianza por la Democracia | APD | 1992 | Progressivism | | 2 / 190 | |
| Country Alliance; Alianza País | ALPAÍS | 2011 | Democratic socialism | | 2 / 190 | |
| Civic Renovation Party; Partido Cívico Renovador | PCR | 2006 | Democratic socialism | | 1 / 190 | |
| Dominican Humanist Party; Partido Humanista Dominicano | PHD | 2006 | Humanism | | 1 / 190 | |
| Liberal Reformist Party; Partido Reformista Liberal | PRL | 1986 | Liberalism | | 1 / 190 | |
| Quisqueyano Christian Democratic Party; Partido Quisqueyano Demócrata Cristiano | PQDC | 2006 | Social conservatism | | 1 / 190 | |
| Revolutionary Social Democratic Party; Partido Revolucionario Social Demócrata | PRSD | 2005 | Social democracy | | 1 / 190 | |
| Democratic Choice; Opción Democrática | OD | 2014 | Social democracy | 0 / 32 | 0 / 190 | 0 / 155 |
| Social Christian Reformist Party; Partido Reformista Social Cristiano | PRSC | 1984 | Liberal conservatism | 1 / 32 | 4 / 190 | 7 / 158 |

=== Local parties ===
The parties listed below are not represented in Congress, but control at least one municipal council.

| Name | Abbr. | Founded | Ideology | Mayors |
|---|---|---|---|---|
| Christian People's Party; Partido Popular Cristiano | PPC | 1981 | Christian left | 1 / 158 |

=== Other parties ===
| Name | Abbr. | Founded | Ideology |
|---|---|---|---|
| Alternative Democratic Movement; Movimiento Democrático Alternativo | MODA | 2007 | Liberal socialism |
| Christian Democratic Union Party; Partido Unión Demócrata Cristiano | UDC | 1998 | Christian democracy |
| Institutional Democratic Party; Partido Democrática Institucionál | PDI | 1986 | Christian democracy |
| National Unity Party; Partido de la Unidád Nacionál | PUN | 2001 | Christian socialism |
| Green Socialist Party; Partido Socialista Verde | PASOVE | 2009 | Ecosocialism |
| National Citizen Will Party; Partido Nacional de la Voluntád Ciudadana | PNVC | 1973 | Social conservatism |
| Popular Democratic Party; Partido Democrático Popular | PDP | 1974 | Right-wing populism |
| Independent Revolutionary Party; Partido Revolucionário Independiente | PRI | 1990 | Neoliberalism |
| National Renaissance Party; Partido Renacentista Nacional | PRN | 1987 | Liberal nationalism |
| Force of the Revolution Party; Partido Fuerza de la Revolucion | FR | 1996 | Marxism |
| Humanist Action Movement; Movimiento Acción Humanista | MAH | 2023 | Secular humanism |
| Green Party for a Democratic Unity; Partido Verde de la Unidad Democrática | PVUD | 1985 | Econationalism |
| Country Movement for All; Movimiento Patria para Tod@s | MPT | 2007 | Left-wing nationalism |
| Servers' Generation Party; Partido Generación de Servidores | GS | 2018 | Christian conservatism |
| Possible Country; Pais Posible | PP | 2017 | Economic liberalism |
| Liberal Action Party; Partido de Acción Liberal | PAL | 2010 | Market liberalism |
| National Progressive Force; Fuerza Nacionál Progresísta | FNP | 1980 | National conservatism |
| International Communist Party; Partido Comunista Internacional | PCI | | Communism |
| Communist Party of Labour; Partido Comunista del Trabajo | PCT | 1980 | Hoxhaism |
| Dominican Popular Movement; Movimiento Popular Dominicano | MPD | 1956 | Maoism |
| Communist Party of the Dominican Republic; Partido Comunista de la República Dominicana | PACOREDO | 1966 | Marxism-Leninism-Maoism |
| Marxist-Leninist Party of the Dominican Republic; Partido Marxista-Leninista de la República Dominicana | PMLRD | | Revolutionary socialism |
| Social Justice Party; Partido Justicia Social | JS | 2024 | Social egalitarianism |
| Christian Socialist Party; Partido Socialista Cristiana | PSC | 2005 | Progressive Christianity |
| Social Liberal Action Party; Partido Acción Social Liberal | PASL | | Social liberalism |
| We Can Party; Partido Podemos | PP | | Populism |
| First the People Party; Partido Primero La Gente | PPG | 2015 | Left-wing populism |
| Fifth Republic Movement; Partido V República | MQR | 2008 | Republicanism |
| Rebel Movement; Movimiento Rebelde | MR | 2010 | Guevarism |
| Movement for a Healthy Republic; Movimiento por una República Sana | MRS | 2010 | Classical radicalism |
| National Hope Party; Partido de la Esperanza Nacional | PEN | 2014 | Labourism |
| Socialist Workers' Movement; Movimiento Socialista de los Trabajadores | MST | | Trotskyism |
| United Left Movement; Movimiento Izquierda Unida | MIU | | Socialism of the 21st century |
| Social Libertarian Cibao; Cibao Libertaria Social | CLS | | Left-libertarianism |
| Popular Revolution Party; Partido Revolucionario Popular | PRP | 2014 | Marxism-Leninism |
| Red Rose Party; Partido Rosa Roja | PRR | 2013 | Social democracy |
| Ancient Dominican Order; Antigua Orden Dominicana | AOD | 2012 | Nativism |
| Women's Democratic Union; Union Democrática de las Mujeres | UDEMU | | Feminism |
| Coalition of Cibao; Coalicion de Cibao | CC | 2018 | Democratic socialism |
| Working Women's Movement; Movimiento de las Mujeres Trabajadoras | MMT | | Progressivism |
| Committee for Unity and the Rights of Women; Comité para la Unidad y los Derechos de la Mujer | CUDEM | | Egalitarianism |
| Secular State in the Dominican Republic; Estado Laico en la República Dominicana | ELRD | | Secularism |
| Workers' Classist Union; Union Clasista de los Trabajadores | UCT | | Workerism |
| Democratic Rescue Movement; Movimiento Rescáte Democrática | MRD | 2024 | Revolutionary nationalism |
| Cool People Party; Partido de la Gente Génial | PGF | 2025 | Liberal feminism |
| Free Fatherland Patria Libre | PALIB | 2023 | Libertarian conservatism |
| Dominicans First Dominicanos Primero | DP | 2026 | Populism |

=== Defunct political parties ===
| Name | Abbr. | Founded | Ideology | Position | Dissolution |
|---|---|---|---|---|---|
| Blue Party; Partido Azúl | PA | 1865 | Liberal democracy | Centre-left to centre-right | 1930 |
| Red Party; Partido Rojo | PR | 1865 | Conservatism | Right-wing to centre-right | 1930 |
| Dominican Party; Partido Dominicano | PD | 1931 | Fascism (Trujilism) | Far-right | 1962 |
| Dominican Communist Party; Partido Comunista Dominicano | PCD | 1944 | Marxism-Leninism | Left-wing | 1996 |
| June 14 Political Rally Movement; Movimiento Agrupación Política 14 de Junio | 1J4 | 1959 | Revolutionary socialism | Far-left to left-wing | 1968 |
| National Action Party; Partido Acción Nacional | PAN | 1962 | National conservatism | Far-right | 1966 |
| Authentic Dominican Revolutionary Party; Partido Revolucionario Dominicano Auténtico | PRDA | 1962 | Democratic socialism | Left-wing | 1966 |
| Dominican Revolutionary Nationalist Party; Partido Nacionalista Revolucionario Dominicano | PNRD | 1963 | Left-wing nationalism | Left-wing | 1966 |
| Dominican Revolutionary Vanguard; Vanguardia Revolucionario Dominicano | VRD | 1963 | Socialism | Left-wing | 1966 |
| Christian Democratic Party; Partido Democristiano | PDC | 1962 | Christian democracy | Centre | 1966 |
| Social Democratic Alliance Party; Partido Alianza Socialdemocratica | PASD | 1962 | Social democracy | Centre-left | 1966 |
| Dominican Social Alliance; Alianza Social Dominicana | ASD | 1963 | Social liberalism | Centre-left | 2014 |
| National Civic Union; Union Cívico Nacional | UCN | 1962 | Liberal Catholicism | Centre | 1990 |
| Evolutionist Liberal Party; Partido Liberal Evolucionista | PLE | 1965 | Conservative liberalism | Centre to centre-right | 1966 |
| Movement for Democratic Integration; Movimiento para la Integración Democrática | MIDA | 1968 | Liberal conservatism | Centre-right | 1980 |
| Anti-Imperialist Patriotic Union; Unión Patriótica Antiimperialista | UPA | 1977 | Socialist patriotism | Far-left | 2004 |
| Dominican Workers' Party; Partido de los Trabajadores Dominicanos | PTD | 1979 | Progressivism | Left-wing to centre-left | 2019 |
| Movement for Socialism; Movimiento para el Socialismo | MS | 1980 | Scientific socialism | Left-wing | 1986 |
| Socialist Bloc; Bloque Socialista | BS | 1979 | Socialism | Left-wing | 1990 |
| Constitutional Action Party; Partido Acción Constitucional | PAC | 1982 | Liberal socialism | Centre-left | 1994 |
| Democratic Unity; Unidad Democrática | UD | 1984 | Radical democracy | Left-wing | 1996 |
| New Alternative Party; Partido Alternativa Nueva | PAN | 1999 | Left-wing populism | Left-wing | 2005 |

== See also ==
- List of political parties by country
