= 2010 Dominican Republic parliamentary election =

Election in the Dominican Republic

Parliamentary elections were held in the Dominican Republic on 16 May 2010 to elect the 32 members of the Senate and 183 members of the Chamber of Deputies. Polls forecasted a victory for the Dominican Liberation Party (PLD) of President Leonel Fernández. Before the election, 96 of the 178 Chamber of Deputies seats and 22 of the 32 Senate seats were controlled by the PLD.

The elections were held alongside local elections in 155 municipalities and elections for 20 seats in the Central American Parliament. The Central American Parliament representatives were being elected for the first time, having previously been appointed to their posts. More than 6 million people were eligible to vote in the election.

== Conduct ==
The election was conducted amidst sporadic violence with an opposition Dominican Revolutionary Party (PRD) supporter being killed and three wounded in a clash between government and opposition supporters in San Cristóbal. The dead man was identified as the bodyguard of a PRD mayoral candidate, who was said to have been shot four times with a submachine gun and died in hospital. One of the injured men was the driver for the present mayor. In addition a PLD leader died on 16 May after being surprised whilst purchasing identity documents. A third person had lost their life on 15 May in clashes between PLD and PRD supporters in Samaná.

Election commission officials and representatives from the PRD and PLD made appeals for calm during the election. President Leonel Fernández said that the violence would not affect the poll results.

An election monitoring mission from the Organization of American States said that it had received complaints of fake or purchased identity documents being used to vote. However, it ratified the election as mostly free and fair.

== Results ==
Party	Votes	%	Seats			
Party	Votes	%	House	+/–	Senate	+/–
Dominican Liberation Party	1,380,601	41.71	93	–3	28	+6
Dominican Revolutionary Party	1,272,536	38.44	73	+13	0	–7
Social Christian Reformist Party	203,729	6.15	11	–11	4	+1
Alternative Democratic Movement	46,630	1.41	1	New	0	New
Alliance for Democracy	46,250	1.40	1	+1	0	0
Social Democratic Institutional Bloc	43,665	1.32	1	+1	0	0
Quisqueyano Christian Democratic Party	37,283	1.13	0	0	0	0
Movement for Independence, Unity and Change	31,584	0.95	1	+1	0	0
Christian Democratic Union	30,267	0.91	0	0	0	0
National Progressive Force	22,678	0.69	1	New	0	New
Revolutionary Social Democratic Party	20,838	0.63	0	0	0	0
Dominican Humanist Party	18,836	0.57	0	0	0	0
Dominican Workers' Party	17,673	0.53	0	0	0	0
Christian People's Party	16,340	0.49	1	+1	0	0
Dominicans for Change	16,045	0.48	0	New	0	New
People's Democratic Party	15,784	0.48	0	0	0	0
National Unity Party	13,925	0.42	0	0	0	0
National Civic Veterans Party	13,308	0.40	0	0	0	0
Liberal Party of the Dominican Republic	13,229	0.40	0	0	0	0
Civic Renovation Party	12,238	0.37	0	New	0	New
Liberal Party of Action	11,422	0.35	0	New	0	New
Institutional Democratic Party	9,741	0.29	0	New	0	New
Independent Revolutionary Party	8,083	0.24	0	0	0	0
Green Socialist Party	6,595	0.20	0	New	0	New
Dominican Social Alliance	560	0.02	0	0	0	0
Green Party of Democratic Unity	542	0.02	0	0	0	0
Total	3,310,382	100.00	183	+5	32	0
Valid votes	3,310,382	95.92				
Invalid/blank votes	140,986	4.08				
Total votes	3,451,368	100.00				
Registered voters/turnout	6,116,397	56.43				
Source: JCE

=== Local elections ===
The PLD had 91 mayors elected of the 155 positions. The PRD and Social Christian Reformist Party won 58 and the Partido Popular Cristiano and the Christian Democratic Union won one apiece. The PRD blamed the 32 single-seat senate constituencies for their poor showing. The single seats led to a lack of proportionality with them failing to take any despite winning 42% of the vote. The PRD increased its overall vote share to 42% whilst the PRSC saw its vote share slump to 2% from 24% in 2002.

The leader of the opposition PRD has alleged fraud and blackmail were carried out by the ruling PLD. It has been alleged that in some constituencies the number of votes cast exceeded the number of registered voters. A press conference in which the PRD were to have presented evidence of fraud was cancelled with no explanation, while leaders of the PRD have called its current party president to step down. The PRD has established a commission to co-ordinate challenges against the results.
