= 2002 Dominican Republic parliamentary election =

Election in the Dominican Republic

Parliamentary elections were held in the Dominican Republic on 16 May 2002. The result was a victory for the opposition Dominican Revolutionary Party-led alliance, which won 73 of the 150 seats in the House of Representatives. Voter turnout was 51.0%.

== Results ==
Party	Votes	%	Seats			
Party	Votes	%	House	+/–	Senate	+/–
PRD–UD–ASD–PRN	963,735	42.21	73	–	29	–
PLD–BIS–APD	657,658	28.80	41	–	1	–
PRSC–PPC	556,431	24.37	36	–	2	–
Independent Revolutionary Party	35,859	1.57	0	New	0	New
Democratic Quisqueyano Party	29,969	1.31	0	–	0	–
FR–MIUCA–PNA	14,148	0.62	0	New	0	New
National Civic Veterans Party	12,310	0.54	0	New	0	New
Christian Democratic Union	4,946	0.22	0	New	0	New
Dominican Workers' Party and allies	2,792	0.12	0	New	0	New
MIUCA–PRN	5,561	0.24	0	0	0	0
National Unity Party	5,561	0.24	0	New	0	New
MISAR	5,561	0.24	0	New	0	New
Total	2,283,409	100.00	150	+1	32	+2
Valid votes	2,283,409	96.28				
Invalid/blank votes	88,182	3.72				
Total votes	2,371,591	100.00				
Registered voters/turnout	4,647,839	51.03				
Source: Nohlen
