= 2006 Dominican Republic parliamentary election =

Election in the Dominican Republic

Parliamentary elections were held in the Dominican Republic on 16 May 2006. They were won by the Progressive Bloc led by the Dominican Liberation Party, which took 96 of the 178 seats in the Chamber of Deputies and 22 of the 32 Senate seats.

== Results ==
Party or alliance		Votes	%	Seats	
Party or alliance		Votes	%	House	Senate
Progressive; Bloc	Dominican Liberation Party	1,394,834	46.45	96	22
Progressive; Bloc	Social Democratic Institutional Bloc	76,044	2.53	0	0
Progressive; Bloc	Alliance for Democracy	46,671	1.55	0	0
Progressive; Bloc	Christian Democratic Union	24,841	0.83	0	0
Progressive; Bloc	Dominican Workers' Party	16,733	0.56	0	0
Progressive; Bloc	Liberal Party of the Dominican Republic	14,224	0.47	0	0
Grand; National; Alliance	Dominican Revolutionary Party	934,500	31.12	60	7
Grand; National; Alliance	Social Christian Reformist Party	328,542	10.94	22	3
Grand; National; Alliance	National Unity Party	34,828	1.16	0	0
Grand; National; Alliance	Quisqueyano Christian Democratic Party	23,933	0.80	0	0
Grand; National; Alliance	Green Party of Democratic Unity	14,690	0.49	0	0
Grand; National; Alliance	National Civic Veterans Party	12,055	0.40	0	0
Grand; National; Alliance	Dominican Social Alliance	6,038	0.20	0	0
Grand; National; Alliance	People's Democratic Party	5,431	0.18	0	0
Grand; National; Alliance	Christian People's Party	4,786	0.16	0	0
Revolutionary Social Democratic Party		45,487	1.51	0	0
Movement for Independence, Unity and Change		8,552	0.28	0	0
Independent Revolutionary Party		5,345	0.18	0	0
National Renaissance Party		2,813	0.09	0	0
Dominican Humanist Party		2,360	0.08	0	0
Total		3,002,707	100.00	178	32
Valid votes		3,003,001	96.20		
Invalid/blank votes		118,664	3.80		
Total votes		3,121,665	100.00		
Registered voters/turnout		5,276,419	59.16		
Source: Election Passport, IPU
