= Sergia Elena de Séliman =

The Honourable Sergia Elena de Séliman
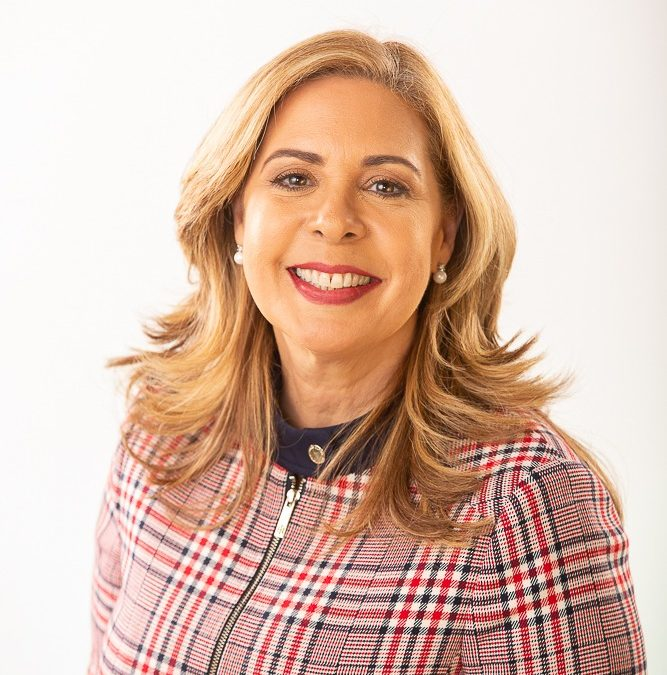
- Sergia Elena de Séliman, 2019

Member of the Monetary Board of the Dominican Republic
- Incumbent
- Assumed office 19 November 2020
- President: Héctor Valdez Albizu

Member of the Central American Parliament for the Dominican Republic
- In office 16 August 2016 – 10 November 2020
- Lieutenant: Carlos Juan Séliman

Personal details
- Born: Sergia Elena Mejía de Peña; 1 October 1963 (age 62) Santo Domingo, Dominican Republic
- Party: Social Christian Reformist Party
- Spouse: Juan Luis Séliman Haza
- Children: 3, including Carlos Juan Séliman (b. 1989)
- Ethnicity: White Dominican
- Website: Sergia Elena de Séliman on Facebook

Sergia Elena de Séliman (née Mejía de Peña; born 1 October 1963) is a politician from the Dominican Republic. Since 19 November 2020 Séliman is a member of the Monetary Board of the Dominican Republic, the entity that oversees the Central Bank of the Dominican Republic and the Superintendency of Banks.

== Biography ==
Séliman was elected in 2016 as a Dominican Republic deputy to the Central American Parliament, while her son Carlos Juan Séliman was her runningmate as vice-deputy. Previously she ran unsuccessfully to deputy for the National District in 2010 and vice-mayor of Santo Domingo in 2006. She also ran in the 2020 Dominican presidential elections as the runningmate of former President and Social Christian Reformist Party’s presidential candidate Leonel Fernández.

On November 16, 2020, President Luis Abinader appointed her as a member of the Monetary Board.
