= Dos mas Dos =

Dos más Dos (literally: "two plus two") is the informal term applied to a demagogic formula, fashioned by the Dominican Revolutionary Party (PRD) political party in Dominican Republic. It is credited to the late party leader José Francisco Peña Gómez.

== Definition ==
It is designed to allow two (or more) same-party members share a particular congressional seat during a single political term, which lasts four years (2+2=4). This is permitted by means of well manipulated Constitutional loopholes orchestrated by the political party who usually holds the executive branch seat (Head of State) and/or has congressional majority (both in upper and lower chambers).

It has been used mostly by the PRD party which coined the term themselves, but it may apply to the other two main Dominican parties.

== Mechanism ==
The Dos más Dos formula works as follows:

1. During primary elections the party does not come to a conclusion as to who is going to be selected to represent the party in the next elections ballot for a particular Senate (or lower representative) chair. This is the result of internal payoffs and/or electoral "sabotage". It can also happen when there's a clear distinction between one candidate with the wealthiest sponsorship and the other who ranks better in the electoral polls.
2. The "salomonic" solution to this mess is to propose that only one should be registered in the official electoral ballot, and the other should wait for the second mid-term.
3. If the party should win the elections for that particular seat, the elected person can run office for only half the time of the elected term.
4. When the time comes, he should willingly retire in lieu of some phony excuse. The most alleged excuse is "health reasons", although some more cynical step down claiming "patriotic" reasons.
5. He should immediately propose to Congress his substitute, which in no surprise, is the party member that "tied" with him in the internal primaries for that spot.
6. The second candidate takes office.

== Flaws ==
- The main flaw to this "private agreement" strategy is that violates a primary Constitutional precept that states that no congressional seat should be held by a person that no voter elected for in the first place.
- Even since its first use, the vast majority of elected members that used the "2+2" formula refuses to give up their chair when due, claiming that it is a Constitutional violation and a flagrant interference.
- It obviously does not allow a public servant to develop and deploy long (or even short) term legislative plans. The only thing that matters to such candidate is to recoup the campaign "investment" made and to exert maximum political "leverage" for personal profit.
- Recently, due to the personal financial success showed by the "2+2", some PRD members are proposing a "1+1+1+1" alternative, which could allow more "compañeros" to savor the good life a public office can bring.
