= Dominican Republic tar scandal =

On September 10, 2020, the Dominican Republic Attorney General received the first case on the former Minister of Public Works and presidential candidate of the Dominican Liberation Party (PLD), Gonzalo Castillo, in the purchase of hot tar for RD$11.5 billion (US$194.9 million).
