= National Renaissance Party =

The National Renaissance Party may refer to:

- National Renaissance Party (United States)
- National Renaissance Party (Dominican Republic)
- National Renaissance Front (Russia), constitutional monarchist party
- National Renaissance Front, former Romanian para-fascist party
