= Gonzalo Castillo =

Gonzalo Castillo may refer to:

- Gonzalo Castillo (politician) (born 1960), Dominican politician
- Gonzalo Castillo (footballer) (born 1990), Uruguayan footballer
