= 1998 Dominican Republic parliamentary election =

Election in the Dominican Republic

Parliamentary elections were held in the Dominican Republic on 16 May 1998. The result was a victory for the opposition Dominican Revolutionary Party-led alliance, which won 83 of the 149 seats in the House of Representatives. Voter turnout was 52.9%.

== Results ==
| Party | Votes | % | Seats | | | |
| Party | Votes | % | House | +/– | Senate | +/– |
|---|---|---|---|---|---|---|
| PRD–UD–PPC–BIS | 1,075,306 | 51.36 | 83 | – | 24 | – |
| Dominican Liberation Party | 654,713 | 31.27 | 49 | +36 | 4 | +3 |
| PRSC–PQD | 351,347 | 16.78 | 17 | – | 2 | – |
| Institutional Democratic Party | 12,320 | 0.59 | 0 | 0 | 0 | 0 |
| Movement of National Reconciliation | 12,320 | 0.59 | 0 | 0 | 0 | 0 |
| Party of the Dominican People | 12,320 | 0.59 | 0 | 0 | 0 | 0 |
| National Renaissance Party | 12,320 | 0.59 | 0 | 0 | 0 | 0 |
| Total | 2,093,686 | 100.00 | 149 | +29 | 30 | 0 |
| Valid votes | 2,093,686 | 95.88 | | | | |
| Invalid/blank votes | 90,021 | 4.12 | | | | |
| Total votes | 2,183,707 | 100.00 | | | | |
| Registered voters/turnout | 4,129,554 | 52.88 | | | | |
Source: Nohlen
