= Partido Popular Cristiano =

Partido Popular Cristiano may refer to:

- Christian People's Party (Dominican Republic)
- Christian People's Party (Peru)
