= Julián Serulle =

Dominican politician and lawyer

Personal details
- Born: June 6, 1946 (age 78); San Francisco de Macoris

Ángel Julián Serulle Ramia (born 6 June 1946 in San Francisco de Macoris) is a Dominican politician and lawyer. Serulle was one of six presidential candidates who contested the 2012 presidential election. He ran for president as a member of the Broad Front.

== Early life ==
Serulle was born the oldest of 13 children to Lebanese and Palestinian immigrants in the Dominican Republic. He was raised Jesuit. He studied in Padre Fantino High School, located in Santo Cerro, La Vega Province.

He did graduate work in law at Sorbonne University in Paris, France.

== Political career ==
In the 1970s, Julián Serulle joined the Dominican Liberation Party (PLD). In 1994 and 1996, he ran for senator but was not elected. He was briefly the director the Dominican Social Security Institute in 1996.

In 2012, he ran for president under the left-wing Broad Front Coalition.
