= Max Puig =

Dominican politician

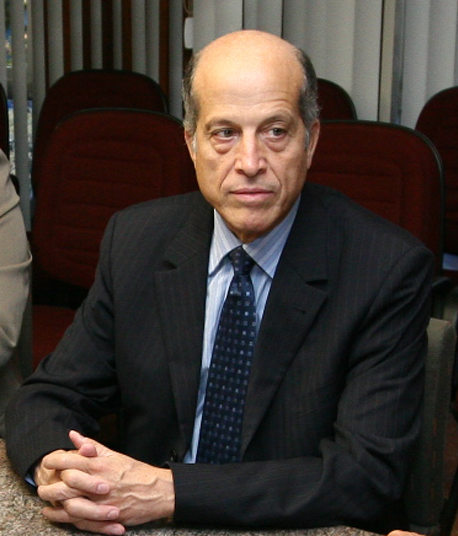

Maximiliano Rabelais Puig Miller (born c. 1946) is a Dominican politician who served as congressman in the 1990s and Minister of Labor and the Environment in the 2000s.

== Early life and family ==
Puig was born in Puerto Plata to Elvia Iluminación Miller Martínez, a renowned teacher, and José Augusto Puig Ortiz, a dissident during the dictatorship of Rafael Trujillo who served as Ambassador to France in the mid-1960s.

By his father, he is descended from José María Arzeno, a 19th-century mayor of Puerto Plata —and the son of an immigrant from Zoagli, then in the Kingdom of Piedmont-Sardinia—, who married Gertrudis Westen, the daughter of a Dutchman and a Haitian mulâtresse. By his mother —whose mother was of Spanish origin, while her father was of African American and Turks and Caicos Islander descent— he is descended from Scipio Beard and Julian Beard, free negroes that migrated to Puerto Plata during the Haitian occupation of Santo Domingo from Missouri, United States.

While living in France, Puig met and married his classmate Elisabeth Buchel, a Frenchwoman; they had 2 children. He has two doctorates, one in Law and other in Political Sciences.

== Political career ==
Puig served as congressman in the 1990s, and as Minister of Labor and Minister of the Environment in the 2000s.

Puig was one of six presidential candidates that contested the 2012 presidential election. Puig ran for president under the Alliance for Democracy (APD) political party.
