= Gonzalo Castillo (politician) =

Dominican politician (born 1960)

Gonzalo Castillo Terrero

Minister of Public Works and Communications
- In office 16 August 2012 – 5 August 2019
- President: Danilo Medina
- Preceded by: Víctor Díaz Rúa
- Succeeded by: Ramón Pepín

Personal details
- Born: 20 November 1960 (age 66) Barahona, Dominican Republic
- Party: Dominican Liberation Party
- Spouse: Silvia López (m. 1984)
- Children: 3
- Education: Instituto Politécnico Loyola

Gonzalo Castillo Terrero (born 20 November 1960) is a Dominican businessman and politician. He was Minister of Public Works and Communications from 2012 to 2019. In July 2019 he sought the Dominican Liberation Party's presidential nomination for the 2020 elections. He won the nomination, but lost the general election to Luis Abinader.

== Biography ==
Gonzalo Castillo Terrero is the second of five brothers from the marriage of Miriam Terrero Samboy from the region of Enriquillo and Gonzalo Castillo Peña, from Baní. He completed his primary studies at the Divina Pastora school in Barahona and later moved to San Cristóbal to do secondary education at the Instituto Politécnico Loyola. There he obtained the title of "Expert in Industrial Electronics" in 1980. Later he studied in Quebec, Canada. In his business career, Castillo Terrero founded his first company in December 1983, dedicated to the sale of technology equipment. In 1992, he founded Helidosa Aviation Group, a company with aero-ambulance services with planes and helicopters, located in the Dominican Republic, which is currently the largest Dominican aviation firm.

=== Political trajectory ===
He started in politics in the Dominican Liberation Party at age 18 in 1979. In 2001 he was elected member of the Central Committee of the PLD.

He has been married since 1984 to Silvia López with whom he has fathered three children: Gonzalo Alexander, Mónica and Silvia Aimée. His brother Ricardo Castillo Terrero is a pilot Colonel of the Dominican Army and Commander of the Quiet City Task Force (CIUTRAN).

== Minister of Public Works and Communications (2012–2019) ==
On 16 August 2012, with decree 454–12, he was sworn into the Cabinet of the President of the Republic Danilo Medina as Minister of Public Works and Communications (MOPC). During his tenure, the Road Assistance service was instituted, through the so-called Military and Police Commission of the Ministry of Public Works, on most of the country's roads and highways.

In addition, it established the DR Road Trust for the management and handling of tolls for highways and roads in the Dominican Republic. It is the first public trust created by the Dominican State, through the Trust Agreement in 2013, between the Ministry of Public Works and Communications (MOPC) and Fiduciaria Reservations, SA, ratified by Resolution number 156 -13 issued by the National Congress.

== Search for the presidential nomination ==
After failing to push for a constitutional reform to enable President Medina to run for a third consecutive term, and having stated on multiple occasions that he would not compete for the presidential nomination, on 30 July 2019, Castillo Terrero announced his intention to appear in the primaries of the PLD. He immediately informed that his campaign manager would be the vice president executive of the CDEEE, Rubén Bichara.

On 10 August, the Central Committee of the Dominican Liberation Party selected him along with 10 other pre-candidates to compete for the presidential candidacy in the primaries to be held on 6 October. The other pre-candidates included: Leonel Fernández, Francisco Domínguez Brito, Reinaldo Pared Pérez, Temístocles Montás, Carlos Amarante Baret, Andrés Navarro García, Maritza Hernández, Manuel Crespo, Radhamés Segura and Melanio Paredes.

Castillo Terrero's rhetoric presented him as wanting to continue the policies of President Medina.

Carlos Amarante Baret and the Secretary General of the PLD, Reinaldo Pared Pérez, on 28 August and 1 September respectively, cited disagreement with the way in which he burst onto the political scene and alleged the abusive use of state resources in his favor. In addition, he was criticized for his lack of political experience and the absence of concrete proposals to address national problems.

On 7 September, he became the unitary pre-candidate for supporters of Danilo Medina by being the favorite in three, and tying for favorite first in one out of four surveys taken. Since then, his main objective has been to obtain the support of the electoral base of the party after the departure of former President Leonel Fernández (who formed People's Force), who has become a secondary opponent after the main opposition candidate Luis Abinader.

== Request for interpellation ==
On 14 March 2017, congressperson Wellington Arnaud asked the Congress of the Republic to interrogate Castillo Terrero (then Minister of Public Works and Communications), regarding the Odebrecht case, to explain the execution of the contracts made with the Brazilian construction company. He assured that in several works there was no evidence of approval of the funds for sinister purposes.

On 23 July 2019, Congressman Fidelio Despradel also requested an interpellation, to explain his participation in six works in which Odebrecht had made irregular disbursements through its bribery department, including Miches-Sabana de La Mar, the expansion of the San Pedro de Macorís highway, the Turístico del Este highway, the Coral highway, the Santiago Ecovía and the Cibao-Sur highway. According to the draft resolution that had been deposited in the Chamber of Deputies, Castillo Terrero made considerable addendums that increased the final cost of the work to favor the construction company in 2013, 2014, 2015, 2016 and 2017.

In June 2019, the International Consortium of Investigative Journalists revealed, through the Época magazine in Brazil, that Odebrecht paid US$39 million in bribes to the Castillo Terrero, as well as to the vice president of the Dominican Corporation of State Electrical Companies (CDEEE), Rubén Bichara, for the construction of the Punta Catalina Thermoelectric Plant.

On 7 August 2019, the Somos Pueblo movement released an 80-page book called "Gonzalazo" that contains information about acts of corruption by Castillo Terrero, and clarified that he would go to the Attorney General's Office to request the investigation into his relationship with shady dealings with Odebrecht and the association of its companies with the Dominican government.

== Arrest ==
In March 2023, Castillo was arrested along Donald Guerrero and José Ramón Peralta on charges of corruption. Later he was held under house arrest and the remaining two politicians were jailed. However, in December 2023, a judge overturned his house arrest but prevented him from travelling abroad.

Political offices
Preceded by Víctor Díaz Rúa	Minister of Public Works and Communications; 2012−2019	Succeeded by Ramón Pepín
Party political offices
Preceded by Danilo Medina	PLD nominee for President of the Dominican Republic; 2020	Most recent
