= National Renaissance Party (Dominican Republic) =

Minor political party in the Dominican Republic

The National Renaissance Party (Spanish: Partido Renacentista Nacional) is a minor political party in the Dominican Republic. It first contested national elections in 1994, when it failed to win a seat. They again failed to win a seat in 1998, whilst their candidate received less than 1% of the vote in the 2000 presidential elections. For the 2002 elections it was part of the victorious Dominican Revolutionary Party-led alliance. It ran alone in the 2006 elections, but received only 0.1% of the national vote, failing to win a seat.
