= Modern Revolutionary Party =

Modern Revolutionary Party Partido Revolucionario Moderno
- Abbreviation: PRM
- Leader: Luis Abinader
- President: Luis Abinader
- Secretary-General: Juan Garrigó Mejía
- Spokesperson: María Mercedes Ortiz Diloné (Senate); Amado Antonio Díaz Jiménez (Chamber of Deputies)
- Vice Presidents: List: 1. Deligne Ascención; 2. Milagros Ortiz Bosch; 3. Eddy Olivares; 4. Nelson Arroyo; 5. Salvador Ramos
- Founder: Luis Abinader & Hipólito Mejía
- Founded: 9 September 2014; 12 years ago
- Split from: Dominican Revolutionary Party
- Preceded by: Dominican Social Alliance
- Headquarters: Avenida 27 de Febrero 200, El Vergel, Santo Domingo, Distrito Nacional, 10107, Dominican Republic
- Newspaper: La Voz Del PRM ("The Voice Of The PRM")
- Student wing: Frente Estudiantil Socialista Democrático (FESD-16) ("Democratic Socialist Student Front")
- Youth wing: Juventud Revolucionaria Moderna (JRM) ("Modern Revolutionary Youth")
- Membership (2026): 1,623,000
- Ideology: Liberalism; Progressivism
- Political position: Centre to centre-left
- Regional affiliation: São Paulo Forum; COPPPAL
- International affiliation: Progressive Alliance
- Colors: Blue and white
- Slogan: Democracia, Desarrollo e Igualdad ("Democracy, Development and Equality")
- Anthem: "Himno del Partido Revolucionario Moderno" "Hymn of Modern Revolutionary Party"
- Chamber of Deputies: 140 / 190
- Senate: 26 / 32
- Mayors: 122 / 155
- Central American Parliament: 12 / 20

Website
- prm.org.do (in Spanish)

The Modern Revolutionary Party (Spanish: Partido Revolucionario Moderno, PRM) is a political party in the Dominican Republic. It emerged after a division within the Dominican Revolutionary Party (PRD). It was recognized on 9 September 2014. The PRM is the legal heir of the Dominican Social Alliance.

The PRM came into power after winning the general election which was held on 5 July 2020. In addition to winning the most seats in both houses of the country's congress, PRM leader Luis Abinader was also elected President of the Dominican Republic and was successfully sworn into office on 16 August 2020.

== Origin and Dominican Social Alliance party ==
The Dominican Social Alliance (Spanish: Alianza Social Dominicana) was a minor political party of the Dominican Republic. It was founded by Rafael Abinader. In 16 May 2006 election, the party was member of the defeated Grand National Alliance. In 2014 it was transformed into a new party, the Modern Revolutionary Party, when most senior leaders of the Dominican Revolutionary Party, widely known as los viejos robles (Spanish for 'the ancient oaks'), followed Luis Abinader and Hipólito Mejía to found a new party.

By 4 August 2014, 34 deputies had confirmed their move from the PRD to the PRM. The PRM participated for the first time in the general elections of 2016, where it led a coalition made up of more than 10 parties.

== Election history ==
=== Presidential elections ===
Election	Party candidate	First Round		Second Round		Result
Election	Party candidate	Votes	%	Votes	%	Result
2016	Luis Abinader	1,613,222	34.98%			Lost ✗
2020	Luis Abinader	2,154,866	52.51%			Elected ✓
2024	Luis Abinader	2,507,297	57.44%			Elected ✓

=== Congressional elections ===
Election	Votes	%	Chamber seats	+/–	Position	Senate seats	+/–	Position
2016	877,101	20.43%	42 / 190	New	2nd	2 / 32	New	2nd
2020	1,634,860	40.84%	86 / 190	▲44	▲1st	17 / 32	▲15	▲1st
2024	2,065,198	48.39%	134 / 190	▲48	1st	24 / 32	▲7	1st
