= Dominican Green Party =

Dominican Green Party Partido Verde Dominicano
- Founded: October 4, 2009
- Ideology: Green politics
- International affiliation: Global Greens (associate)

The Dominican Green Party (Spanish: Partido Verde Dominicano), previously the Green Socialist Party (Spanish: Partido Socialista Verde), is a minor political party of the Dominican Republic. In the 16 May 2006 election, the party was a member of the defeated Grand National Alliance.
