= Broad Front (Dominican Republic) =

Broad Front Frente Amplio
- President: Juan Dionicio Rodríguez Restituyo
- Secretary-General: Heidy Adón Vargas
- Founded: June 14, 1992
- Ideology: Socialism; Progressivism
- Political position: Left-wing
- Regional affiliation: São Paulo Forum
- Chamber of Deputies: 0 / 190
- Senate: 0 / 32

Website
- soyfrenteamplio.com

The Broad Front (Spanish: Frente Amplio), previously named the Movement for Independence, Unity and Change (Spanish: Movimiento Independencia, Unidad y Cambio), is a political formation in the Dominican Republic with a leftist-progressive platform. On the May 16th, 2006 parliamentary election it got 9,735 votes (0.32%), but no seats. In the municipal elections held simultaneously, the group had its best performance in Peralvillo (1,271 votes, 16.36%) and Bayaguana (1,274 votes, 10.27%). Virtudes Álvarez has been its leader for some time.

== Election results ==
=== Presidential elections ===
Election	Candidate	First Round		Second Round		Result
Election	Candidate	Votes	%	Votes	%	Result
1994	Antonio Reynoso	22,548	0.75%	—N/a	—N/a	Lost ✗
1996	Did not contest					
2000	Did not contest					
2004	Did not contest					
2008	Guillermo Moreno García	6,118	0.15%	—N/a	—N/a	Lost ✗
2012	Julián Serulle	6,553	0.14%	—N/a	—N/a	Lost ✗
2016	Elías Wessin	20,423	%0.44	—N/a	—N/a	Lost ✗
2020	Did not contest					
2024	María Teresa Cabrera	6,255	0.14%	—N/a	—N/a	Lost ✗
