= Social Democratic Institutional Bloc =

Minor political party

Social Democratic Institutional Bloc Bloque Institucional Socialdemócrata
- Founded: 1988
- Ideology: Social democracy
- Political position: Center-left to left-wing
- Regional affiliation: São Paulo Forum
- Chamber of Deputies: 1 / 190
- Senate: 0 / 32

Website
- BIS website

The Social Democratic Institutional Bloc (Spanish: Bloque Institucional Socialdemócrata, or BIS) is a political party in the Dominican Republic.

== History ==
Established in 1989, it first contested national elections in 1994 when it was part of a Dominican Revolutionary Party-led alliance that won the Congressional elections. It was again part of the winning PRD bloc in the 1998 elections, before switching its allegiance to the Dominican Liberation Party for the 2002 elections. In the 2006 elections it was part of the victorious Progressive Bloc.

In the 2010 parliamentary elections the party won a seat in the Chamber of Deputies. In the 2016 elections it lost its seat in the House, but won a seat in the Senate. The party retained its Senate seat in the 2020 elections and won two seats in the Chamber.

== See also ==
- Category:Social Democratic Institutional Bloc politicians
