= Alternative Democratic Movement =

Alternative Democratic Movement Movimiento Democratico Alternativo
- Leader: Emilio Rivas
- Founded: 25 November 2007

The Alternative Democratic Movement (Spanish: Movimiento Democrático Alternativo, MODA) is a political party in the Dominican Republic.

== History ==
The party was established on 25 November 2007 by Emilio Rivas. In the 2010 parliamentary elections it won a single seat in the Chamber of Deputies. After increasing its vote share to 2.1%, the party retained its seat in the 2016 elections.
