= National Progressive Force =

Right-wing political party in the Dominican Republic

National Progressive Force Fuerza Nacional Progresista
- Abbreviation: FNP
- Leader: Vinicio Castillo Semán & Pelegrín Castillo
- President: Vincho Castillo
- Founded: July 6, 1980; 46 years ago
- Headquarters: Santo Domingo, Dominican Republic
- Ideology: National conservatism Social conservatism Nationalism
- Political position: Far-right
- National affiliation: Progressive Bloc
- International affiliation: International Democracy Union
- Regional affiliation: Union of Latin American Parties
- Colors: Blue and White
- Chamber of Deputies: 0 / 190
- Senate: 0 / 32
- Mayors: 0 / 155
- Central American Parliament: 0 / 20

Website
- fnp.org.do

The National Progressive Force (Spanish: Fuerza Nacional Progresista, FNP), is a political party in the Dominican Republic, with a self-described centre-right position, although according to some, the policies it defends (mainly on moral and migratory issues) place it on the spectrum as something closer to a party of the far-right.

== History ==
The founding of the FNP on July 6, 1980, with the motto "Peace, Justice, Liberty", by Marino Vinicio Castillo, was regarded by many as a declaration of independence from Joaquín Balaguer. The Party participated in general elections for the first time in 1982, with Castillo as a presidential candidate. Nevertheless, since the FNP had been recognized by the Junta Central Electoral only two months before, its impact was negligible. In 1986, with Castillo running as a presidential candidate for the second time, the FNP gained 6,684 votes, equivalent to 0.32 percent of those registered. In the 1990 elections, Castillo again ran, this time seeking backing from the poor, the peasants, and all Dominican "who hoped for a decent future". To this end, Castillo promised a more even distribution of wealth by way of agricultural reform. For Castillo, this constituted a basic, fundamental structural change. The FNP proposed to more fully integrate the various sectors of Dominican society, to stimulate production, to combat narcotics traffickers, to fight against corruption, and to improve sanitation. These perspectives were not enough to significantly improve the FNP performance over 1986. Since 1996, Castillo has been allied with the PLD and has become a major electoral support during the past two elections of the winning Progressive Bloc.

== 2006 Parliamentary elections ==
In the parliamentary elections of 2006, the FNP had two candidates elected to the Chamber of Deputies:

- Pelegrín Castillo, Distrito Nacional
- José Ricardo Taveras, Santiago

== 2008 Presidential elections ==
In the presidential elections of 2008, the FNP gained 48,554 votes, equivalent to 1.19 percent of those registered.

== 2010 Parliamentary elections ==
In the parliamentary elections of 2010, the FNP just had one candidate elected to the Chamber of Deputies:

- Pelegrín Castillo, Distrito Nacional
