= National Unity Party (Dominican Republic) =

The National Unity Party (Spanish: Partido de Unidad Nacional) is a minor political party in the Dominican Republic. It first contested national elections in 2002, when it received less than 1% of the vote and failed to win a seat. At the 2006 parliamentary election it was part of the defeated Grand National Alliance.
