= Christian Democratic Union (Dominican Republic) =

Political party in the Dominican Republic

The Christian Democratic Union (Spanish: Unión Demócrata Cristiana) is a Christian democratic political party of the Dominican Republic. It first contested national elections in 2002, when it received 0.2% of the vote in the parliamentary elections that year, failing to win a seat. In the 2006 elections it was part of the victorious Progressive Bloc, but again failed to win a seat after receiving only 0.2% of the vote. In the 2010 elections its vote share fell to 0.1%.
