= Civic Renovation Party =

Civic Renovation Party Partido Cívico Renovador
- Abbreviation: PCR
- President: Jorge Radhamés Zorrilla Ozuna
- Secretary-General: Franklin White
- Founder: Jorge Radhamés Zorrilla Ozuna
- Founded: 2006
- Registered: December 16, 2009
- Split from: Social Democratic Institutional Bloc
- Newspaper: El Renovador
- Ideology: Social democracy
- Political position: Centre-left to left-wing
- National affiliation: Progressive Bloc
- Regional affiliation: Parliamentary Group of the Left
- Colors
- Slogan: Renovemos la Patria, con Dios y la Fuerza de la Unión
- Chamber of Deputies: 1 / 190
- Senate: 0 / 32
- Mayors: 0 / 155

Party flag

Website
- www.pcr.org.do

The Civic Renovation Party (Spanish: Partido Cívico Renovador, or PCR) is a political party in the Dominican Republic which was founded in 2006 as the Civic Renovation Movement by Jorge Radhamés Zorrilla Ozuna and a group of social-democratic Dominicans.

The party was recognized by the Junta Central Electoral on December 16, 2009 and participated in the 2012 presidential elections, supporting Dominican Liberation Party candidate Danilo Medina through the Progressive Bloc.

== Principles ==
The Civic Renovation Party is "a political organization built by Dominican men and women with freedom of action, pacts, and alliances, and with a strategic vision towards the consolidation of true democracy. This party conceives democracy as equality in social, political, economic, and educational opportunities."

== Organization ==
The General Statutes outline the party's organization. The National Assembly (or Convention), its executive branch, is governed by the party president of the party. It consists of:

- Members of the National Direction
- The president and secretary of each municipality
- The president of each municipal district
- The president, secretary-general, organizational, electoral, women's and youth secretaries of provincial committees (except the Distrito Nacional)

The Distrito Nacional and the provinces of Santo Domingo and Santiago are each represented by 10 delegates and their president and secretary-general. The National Assembly meets every two years; extraordinary meetings may be called by the president and secretary-general, the Executive Commission, or two-thirds of the National Direction. It approves and modifies party guidelines and the General Statutes, and elects the National Direction and the party's president and secretary-general.

The National Direction consists of the Executive and Political Commissions, the presidents and secretaries-general of the provincial committees, and the presidents of the municipal committees and districts. It elects the Executive Commission (except the party president and secretary-general), national secretaries and regional directors; implements National Assembly policies, and is familiar with Executive Commission reports. The National Direction meets every six months, and extraordinarily meetings may be called by the president and Secretary-General or two-thirds of its members.

The Executive Commission executes and directs policies approved by the National Assembly and National Direction. It consists of the president and vice-presidents, the secretary-general, the undersecretary-general, national secretaries, regional directors, and the presidents of the Distrito Nacional and the provinces of Santo Domingo and Santiago. The commission implements National Direction policies and resolutions and National Assembly policies; directs relationships with other national and international organizations; recommends, approves, and modifies regulations and statutes, and nominates National Direction members. It meets every three months.

The Policy Commission directs policies and resolutions approved by the National Assembly and the National Direction. It consists of nine members: the president, the first vice-president, the secretary-general, the financial and organizational secretaries, the presidents of the Distrito Nacional and the provinces of Santo Domingo and Santiago, and a member appointed by the party president. The Policy Commission determines the number of commissions needed to perform specific tasks; follows up policies, actions, and resolutions approved by the National Direction and the Executive Commission, and elaborates regulations, codes, and procedures to regulate the party's bodies.

== Party flag and anthem ==
The Civic Renovation Party flag has five horizontal stripes: green, symbolizing hope; yellow, symbolizing justice and faith in democracy, and red. The center has a coat of arms: a white hand holding a red flame, symbolizing solidarity with the Dominican nation. The upper part of the coat of arms has the party's acronym (Spanish: PCR) in navy blue. Under the coat of arms is the party's motto: Democracia, Justicia y Solidaridad (Democracy, Justice, and Solidarity). The PCR anthem was written by party president Jorge Radhamés Zorrilla Ozuna to encourage societal development and well-being, regardless of personal religion or beliefs.

== President ==
The president is the party's spokesperson and official representative and presides over the National Assembly, the National Direction, and the Executive Commission. They may convoke the National Direction, Executive Commission, and Political Commission whenever necessary to resolve an urgent situation affecting the country or the PCR. The president presides over every PCR meeting, designates the commission of assessors, convokes extraordinary National Assembly meetings, and administers party income and expenses with the director of finance.

Party founder Jorge Radhamés Zorrilla Ozuna is the current president. A follower of Juan Pablo Duarte, Gregorio Luperón, José Francisco Peña Gómez, and Juan Bosch, Zorrilla Ozuna bases the party's ideology on "serving the country, the people, and every Dominican; rescuing our origins and defending full democracy" and believes strongly that "a country without education, food, health, home, or equality cannot fully develop".

== Progressive Renovator Pact ==
The Dominican Liberation Party (PLD), represented by President Leonel Fernández, Secretary-General Reinaldo Pared Pérez and Danilo Medina, signed the Progressive Renovation Pact with the PCR, represented by President Jorge Radhamés Zorrilla Ozuna and secretary-general Franklin White, on January 8, 2012. The pact, supporting Medina's candidacy for President of the Dominican Republic and Margarita Cedeño for Vice President, was signed with representatives of the PLD's Political Committee, its National Campaign Committee, and the PCR's National Direction. Other participating PLD members were Francisco Javier García, general coordinator of the campaign; Euclides Gutiérrez Félix; Jaime David Fernández Mirabal, Temístocles Montás, Roberto Salcedo, and provincial Senators.
