= Christian People's Party (Dominican Republic) =

Political party in Dominican Republic

The Christian People's Party (Spanish: Partido Popular Cristiano) is a minor political party in the Dominican Republic. It first contested national elections in 1986, when it was part of the Dominican Revolutionary Party-led alliance which lost to the Social Christian Reformist Party coalition. In the 1990 elections it formed an alliance with MIM, but received only 0.4% of the national vote and failed to win a seat. The party did not contest the 1994 elections, but was again part of a Dominican Revolutionary Party-led alliance in the 1998 elections. However, it switched its allegiance to the Social Christian Reformist Party for the 2002 elections. It had a candidate in the 2004 presidential elections, but they received less than 0.5% of the vote. In the 2006 elections it was part of the defeated Grand National Alliance. The party did not contest the 2010 elections.
