= Institutional Democratic Party (Dominican Republic) =

Institutional Democratic Party Partido Demócrata Institucional
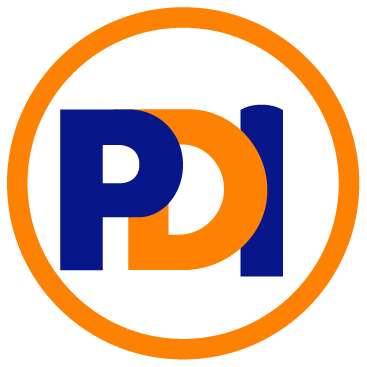
- Abbreviation: PDI
- Founder: Ismael Reyes Cruz
- Founded: 1986
- Ideology: Christian democracy Nationalism

Website
- Official website

The Institutional Democratic Party (Spanish: Partido Demócrata Institucional, PDI) is a minor Christian-democratic and nationalist political party in the Dominican Republic. It was founded in 1986 by Ismael Reyes Cruz.
