= Alliance for Democracy (Dominican Republic) =

Political party in the Dominican Republic

The Alliance for Democracy (Spanish: Alianza por la Democracia, APD) is a political party in the Dominican Republic. It first contested national elections in 2002, when it was part of the defeated Dominican Liberation Party-led alliance. In the 2006 elections it was part of the victorious Progressive Bloc.
