= Quisqueyano Christian Democratic Party =

Quisqueyano Christian Democratic Party Partido Quisqueyano Demócrata Cristiano
- President: Elías Wessin Chávez
- Founded: June 13, 1967
- Headquarters: Calle Uruguay, esquina. Bolívar #51 Santo Domingo
- Ideology: Social conservatism Nationalism; Christian democracy
- Political position: Center-right
- Chamber of Deputies: 1 / 190
- Senate: 0 / 32

Office in Santo Domingo

The Quisqueyano Christian Democratic Party (Spanish: Partido Quisqueyano Demócrata Cristiano) is a minor social-conservative, nationalist, Christian-democratic political party of the Dominican Republic. In the 16 May 2006 election, the party was a member of the defeated Grand National Alliance.
