= Independent Revolutionary Party =

The Independent Revolutionary Party (Spanish: Partido Revolucionario Independiente, PRI) is a minor political party of the Dominican Republic.

The party was founded in 1989 by Jacobo Majluta, who served briefly as President of the Dominican Republic in 1982 and Vice President from 1978 to 1982, as a way to further his political and electoral ambitions. His wife, former first lady Ana Elisa Villanueva, served as the party's vice president.
