= 2020 Dominican Republic protests =

Series of protests in the Dominican Republic

2020 Dominican Republic elections protests
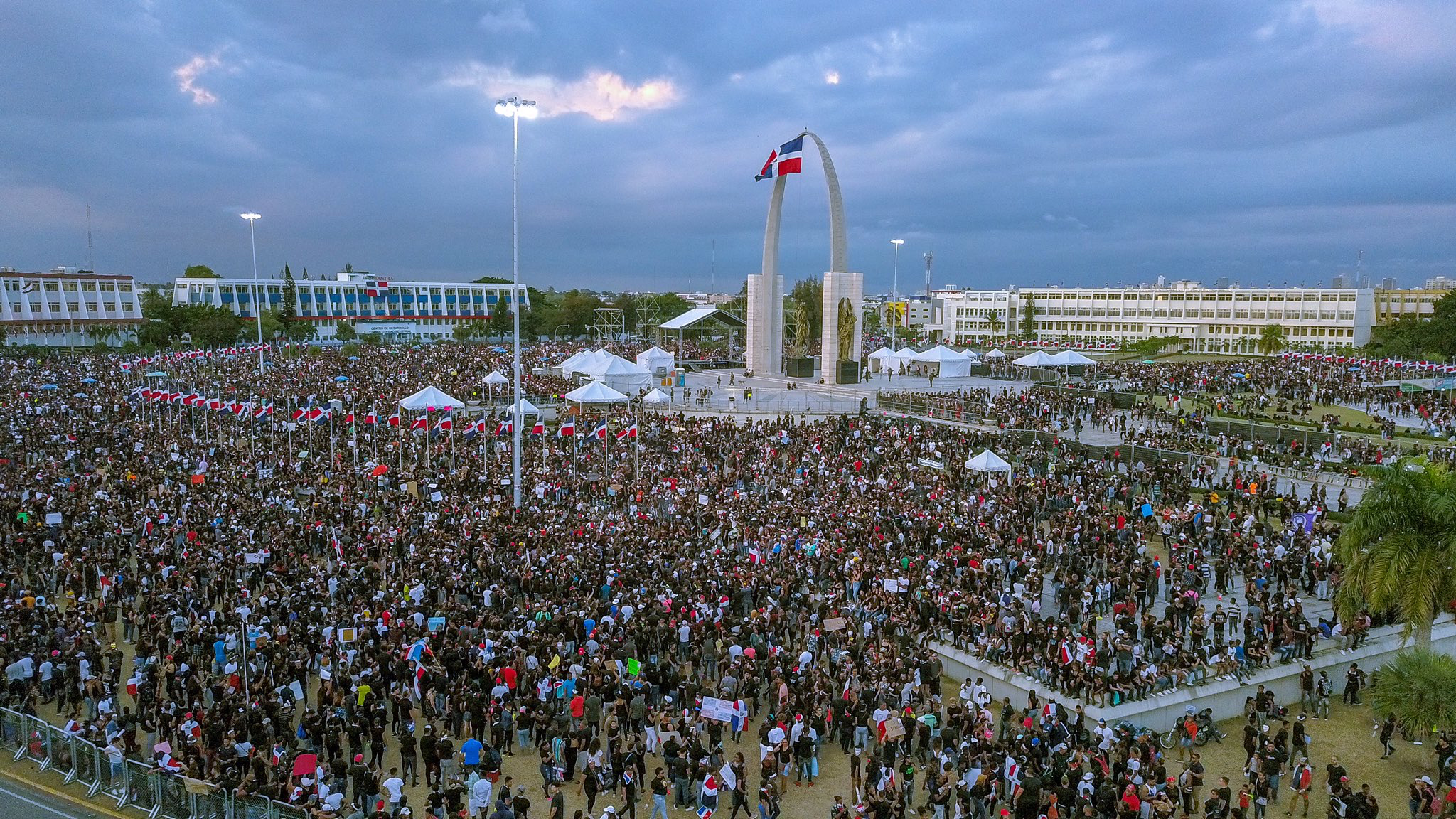
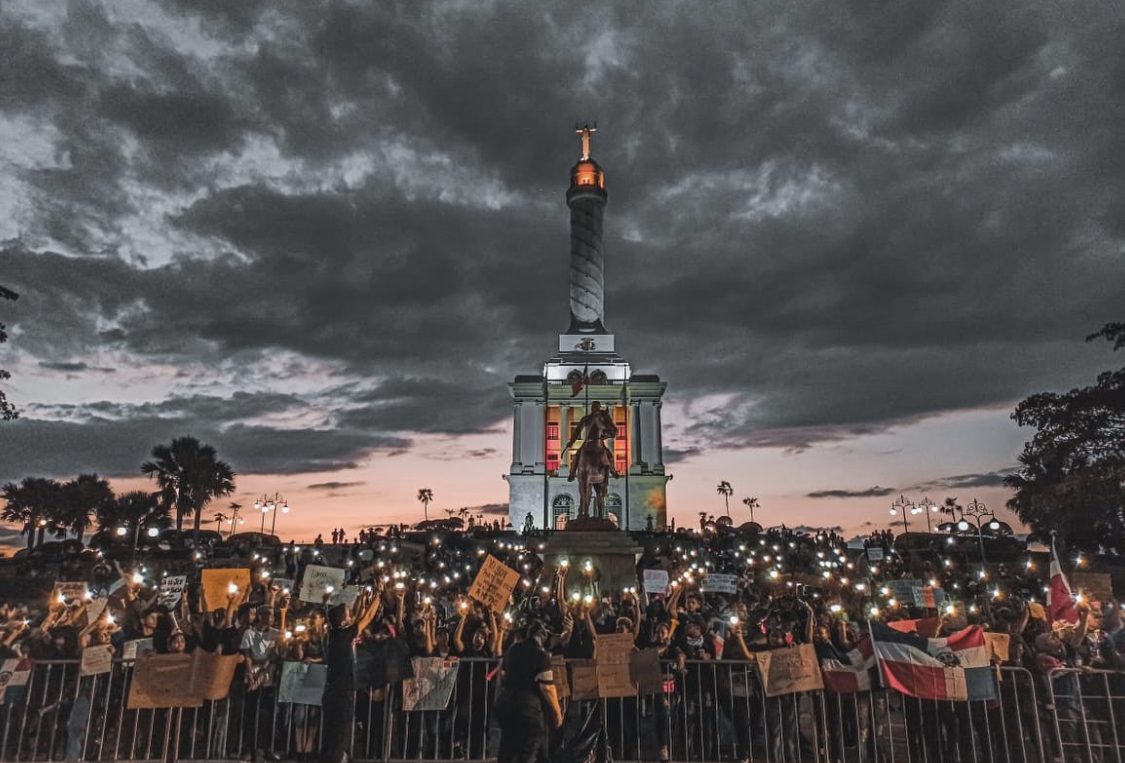
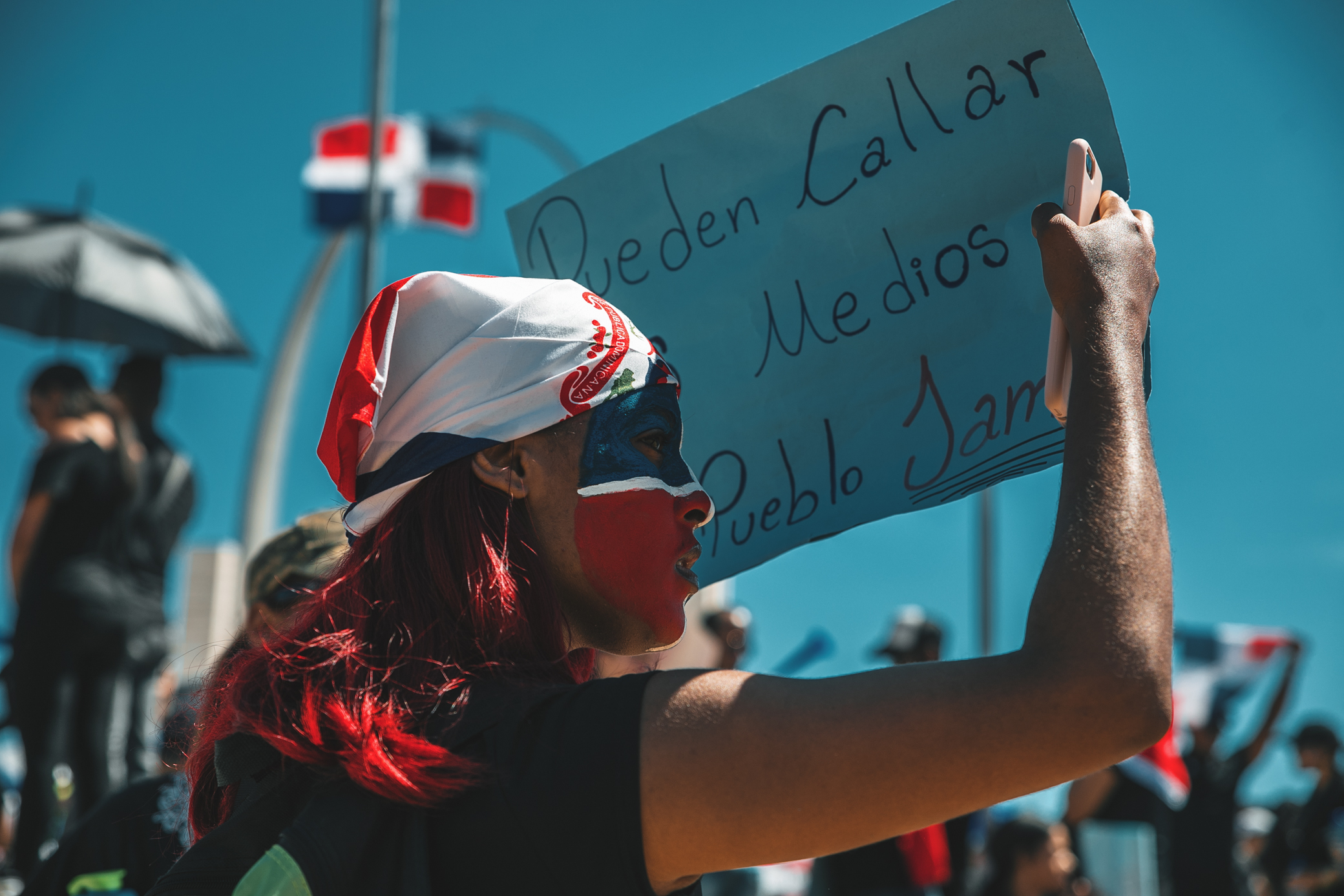
- Graph of the manifestations nationwide. (Top to bottom, left to right): Protesters gathered in Flag Square of Santo Domingo. Protesters in the city of Santiago. Protestor with flag face-paint.
- Date: 16 February 2020 – 12 March 2020
- Location: Dominican Republic
- Caused by: Suspension of the municipal elections of February 2020.; Distrust in the Central Electoral Board.; Electoral fraud accusations due to "vulnerability of electronic voting".
- Goals: Placing the accused to investigate all the criminal acts that occurred before and after the 2020 electoral process, as was done in the prosecution of the accused, together with their respective sanction.; Appointment of an Electoral Procurator by way of citizen political consensus and that is independent of the political organization.; Live broadcast of all the hearings and consultation processes with the delegates of the political parties from here until the end of the electoral period.
- Result: Suspension of the institution's IT director.; Incorporation of the OAS in the investigation on the suspension of the municipal elections.; Integration, independently, of supervisory delegates in the "Monitoring / Accompaniment Commission" before the plenary session of the Central Electoral Board, by the protesting society.; Live broadcast of the vote count, after 5:00 pm on Sunday, March 15, the day of the postponed municipal elections, including the recording by the polling station delegates.; Defeat of the ruling party (PLD) in the presidential and municipal elections.

Casualties
- Deaths: 2

The 2020 protests in the Dominican Republic comprised a series of massive congregations, both in the Dominican Republic and internationally, which took place from Sunday, February 16, to Thursday, March 12, 2020, as a result of the Central Electoral Board suspending municipal elections for the first time in the entire history of national democracy. This decision was due to "errors" presented by electronic voting in the polling stations of 18 municipalities of the country, during the elections, in which around 62% of the votes were concentrated, despite the fact that manual votes, which were also applied in those demarcations, were being carried out without problems.

The suspension of the elections generated discontent that transcended all social sectors. A group of young people, through their social media accounts, called on all Dominicans to congregate in the Plaza de la Bandera, becoming the largest manifestation in the country in recent national history, among those called by civil society. In this way, pressure was sought on the authorities, first of all, so that they resigned, going on to an investigation of what happened, the culprits were punished, and subsequent transparent elections were held.

== Background ==
The night before the municipal elections on Sunday, February 16, several technicians from the Central Electoral Board were working with the automated voting machines trying to fix a few identified issues with the electronic voting machines, but without previously notifying the political delegates. After a meeting that lasted all morning, it was reported that there had been a failure in the ballots of some polling stations, which did not show all the candidates, and it was promised to resolve the problem before seven in the morning, time in which the elections should begin.

The environment prior to the voting was characterized by some isolated acts of violence (which resulted in four injuries), a complaint of proselytism, with the distribution of money and household items, supposedly to benefit the ruling party candidates. Faced with the situation, the president of the Central Electoral Board had called on the parties and their leaders to "remain calm" and asked that they collaborate so that the elections would pass "in peace." A commission of the Modern Revolutionary Party went to the headquarters of the institution of the elections, to denounce that its leaders supposedly were "victims of aggression."

On the other hand, the Parties had been called in an emergency because the information was disseminated that "in some schools where automated voting would be used, the devices had been manipulated by the JCE technicians without the presence of the delegates of the parties". The leaders of the Fuerza del Pueblo party met at 10:00 pm with the members of the observers' mission of the Organization of American States (OAS) due to this situation. The automated vote would be used in 9,757 municipalities of 18 municipalities, specifically those that surpassed 13 candidates for councilors, in which 62% of the votes were concentrated.

The incidents recorded on Saturday, February 15, the day before the municipal elections, occurred in Enriquillo, Barahona and in Castañuelas, Montecristi. In both cases, it was reported that there were clashes between leaders of the Modern Revolutionary Party and the Party of the Dominican Liberation.

== Timeline ==
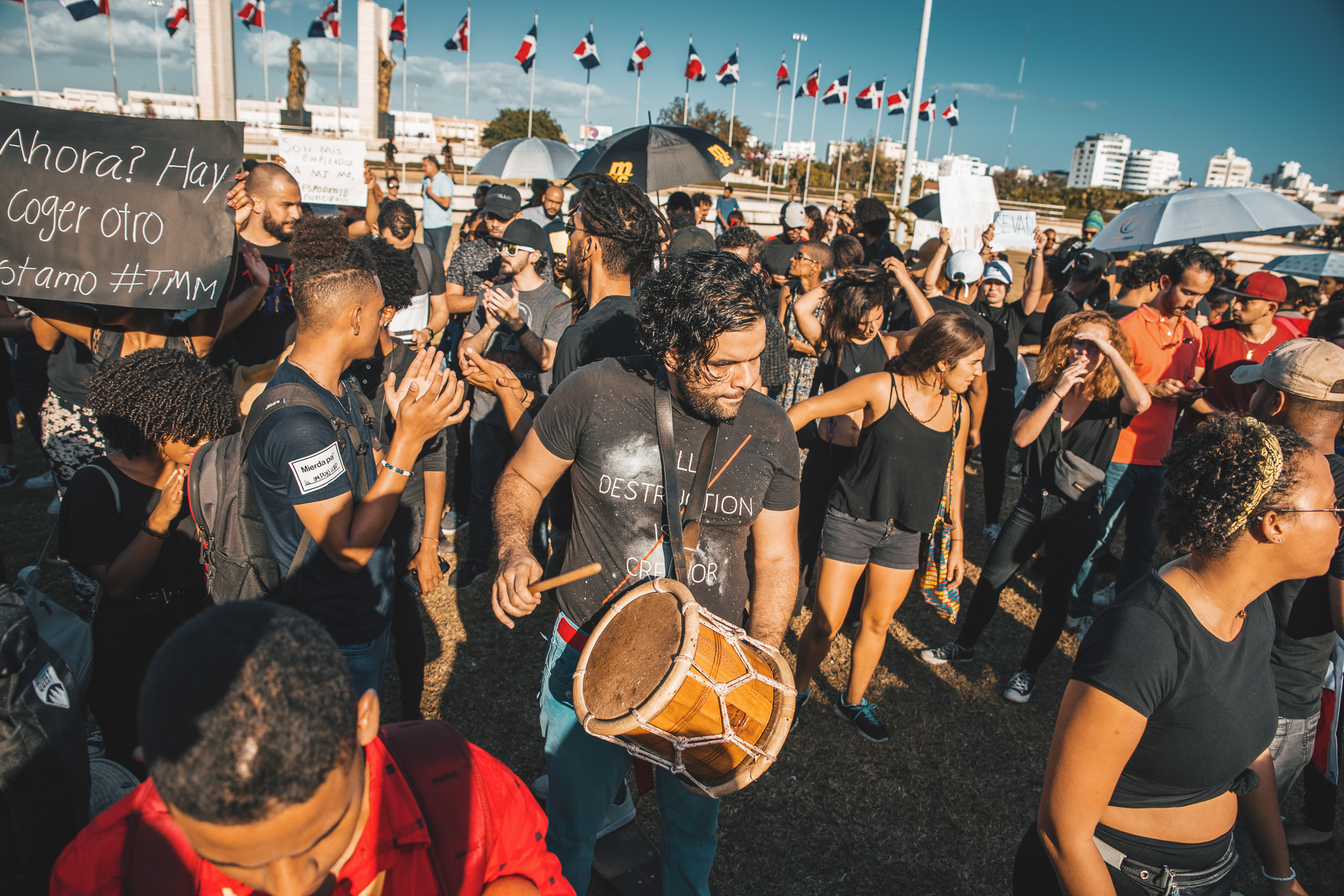
Dominican Republic protests 2020 in Santo Domingo, Plaza de la Bandera.

- February 16
  - Elections scheduled to begin at 6:00 am.
  - Elections delayed to 7:00 am by the Central Electoral Board.
  - The Central Electoral Board halts the election due to massive failures of the electronic voting system.
  - Sadán Terrero, a supporter of mayoral candidate for the Modern Revolutionary Party in the Enriquillo municipality in Barahona, Heriberto Méndez Delgado, was shot while leaving the candidate's home in the early hours of February 16. Earlier on Saturday, Méndez Delgado's home had been subjected to an armed attack by unknown individuals presumed by witnesses to be sympathizers of the ruling Dominican Liberation Party. Terrero died of gunshot wounds en route to a local hospital.
- February 17
  - Yojeiri Cruz, a Dominican Liberation Party local leader, is shot during a fight with a member of the Modern Revolutionary Party at an election polling site located at the Francisco Cabral López school in Guaricano, a neighborhood of Santo Domingo Norte. An altercation erupted between supporters of each party, leading to a shootout in which Cruz was injured. Cruz later died while receiving medical attention at the hospital.
  - The National Business Council urges for an investigation into the suspended elections.
  - The Central Electoral Board reschedules the election for March 15, 2020.
  - The first Protest-In-Black takes place in front of the Central Electoral Board.
  - Protestors demand the resignation of the entire Central Electoral Board.
- February 18
  - Dominican Republic National Police Colonel Ramón Antonio Guzmán Peralta is arrested and charged with sabotaging the election.
  - Claro telecom technician Manuel Antonio Regalado Martinez is arrested and charged with sabotaging the election.
  - The second Protest-In-Black takes place near the Central Electoral Board. Protesters continue to demand the resignation of the entire Central Electoral Board.
- February 19
  - The Dominican Government fires 139 Foreign Ministry officials.
  - Relatives of Claro telecom technician, Manuel Regalado, denounce having bruises after he was arrested by the National Police.
- February 24
  - Former Dominican president Hipolito Mejia proposed Monsignor Agripino Núñez Collado, president of the Economic and Social Council (Dominican Republic) (Spanish: Consejo Económico y Social, CES) as a suitable mediator for the crisis. The CES is a government entity under the Executive branch created during the 2010 reform to the Constitution of the Dominican Republic to promote social dialogue with participation from business sectors, labor representatives, and society at large.
- February 25
  - The Dominican Government increases Dominican National Police and Dominican Army presence in the areas surrounding President Danilo Medina's residence in the Los Cacicazgos neighborhood, which is located near the Flag Square, the main site of the protest in Santo Domingo. Pedestrians and cyclists carrying placards are prohibited from transiting freely on the street, as authorities confiscate and destroy protest signs.
- February 27
  - Thousands gather at the Flag Square to continue the protest on February 27, the same day that Dominican Independence is celebrated. Also scheduled on the same day was President Danilo Medina's State of the Union address to the Congress of the Dominican Republic. Prior to his arrival to the congress chambers, more than 100 senators and members of congress from opposition parties left the building in protest, as they hold the current government responsible for the “grave disturbance to the [country's] institutional and democratic order" represented by the suspended February 16 elections. Alfredo Pacheco, a spokesperson to the Modern Revolutionary Party, in a statement read to the press, also rejected the current government's "constant violations to the Constitution and the law, the suppression of fundamental civil rights, and the permanent transgressions to the principle of impartiality, equity, and transparency of the electoral system".
  - The Economic and Social Council (Dominican Republic) (Spanish: Consejo Económico y Social, CES) offered to mediate a dialogue to resolve the electoral impasse and preserve the country's "political, social, and institutional stability".
- March 2
  - The Industrial Associations Federation president Ramón Porfirio Báez announces the election crisis is beginning to hurt the economy.
  - Former Santo Domingo mayor Roberto Salcedo Sr. resigns from the government and the Dominican Liberation Party.
- March 3
  - The CES is heavily criticized for its intended involvement in the dialogue. According to critics, including members of opposition parties and demonstrators who took to the streets to protest the suspended elections, the CES's very nature as a government entity that operates under the Executive branch of the Dominican government, as well as it stated mission to promote dialogue on “economic, social, and labor matters”, renders it ineligible to lead or mediate a dialogue meant to address electoral and political issues.
- March 4
  - Cacerolazo protests led by demonstrators from various social and political groups erupted on the first day of the dialogue at the site of the meeting and CES headquarters in the administrative building of the Pontificia Universidad Católica Madre y Maestra in Santo Domingo. The meeting was suspended due to the disruption caused by the protests and an internal disagreement between members of the dialogue over the inclusion of a representative of the Dominican Revolutionary Party, whose political alliance with the governing Dominican Liberation Party would have caused an over-representation in a meeting that was meant to provide equal representation for all political movements.
- March 6
  - The CES dialogue continued after an invitation was extended to representatives of the demonstrators to participate in the meeting as an observer and the internal impasse over the PRD's attendance was resolved.
  - A spokesperson who attended the CES meeting on behalf of the protesting groups left the meeting after giving a brief statement in which they rejected the invitation as an observer as insufficiently meaningful. The group also communicated the creation of a national dialogue to take place the same evening in which all citizen groups, political parties, and entities would be allowed to participate.
  - A national dialogue, moderated by psychiatrist Dr. Hector Guerrero Heredia and lawyer Jose Luis Taveras, takes place with representatives from various dissident organizations, demonstrators, social groups, academic institutions, and political parties.
- March 7
  - Despite calls made by representatives of several organizations in the national dialogue held the evening prior to suspend the CES dialogue, the meetings continue to take place. Monsignor Agripino Núñez Collado does not attend the March 7 meeting, citing health issues.

== See also ==
- 2019 Bolivian political crisis
- 2020 Dominican Republic municipal elections
- 2018–19 Haitian protests
- 2003 protests in Dominican Republic
- Gen Z protests
