= 2020 Dominican Republic municipal elections =

Election in the Dominican Republic

Municipal elections were held in the Dominican Republic on February 16, 2020, to elect all local governments officials in the country, including mayors, deputy mayors, aldermen, directors, deputy directors, and voices in municipalities. However, due to countless electoral polling places reporting problems with the electronic voting system within the first few hours of opening the polls, the Central Electoral Board (Spanish: Junta Central Electoral, JCE) decided to suspend the elections. The elections were rescheduled to March 15, 2020.

These would have been the second municipal elections to be held solely and apart from any other electoral process in the country's history and the first since 1968. It is the first time in the country's voting history that elections have been suspended.

After the suspension of the elections, various acts of violence in the province of Santo Domingo took place that left at least two dead and several injured; additionally another person died before the suspension of the election, that is, during the voting.

In the hours following the suspension and for several days after February 16, thousands of Dominicans took to the streets to demand the resignation of the Central Electoral Board.

Initially concentrated at The Flag Square, a monument dedicated to the Dominican flag which is located across the street from the main site of the Central Electoral Board in Santo Domingo de Guzmán, the protests have since extended to other locations across the country, and in cities around the world, led by the Dominican diaspora.

== Electoral system ==
Municipalities in the Dominican Republic are governed by ayuntamientos, which are the basic political institutions in the country. Ayuntamientos have independent legal personality and have two governing bodies, the municipal council, composed of the mayor and a plenary assembly of councillors (the local legislative branch), and the Office of the Mayor, known as Alcaldía, directed by the mayor (the local executive branch). Municipalities are often divided into Municipal Districts, governed by decentralized organs under the municipality known as district councils (Juntas Distritales) composed of a District director (Director distrital) and an assembly of district councillors (vocales).

The city of Santo Domingo de Guzman is contained within the Distrito Nacional, the site of national government, and possesses a special status, as is common in federal nations. However, in practice and for the purposes of local administration, the rules that apply for the country's municipalities also apply for the capital.

Regidores are allocated to municipal councils based on the following scale:

Population	Regidores (councillors)
<25,000	5
25,000-50,000	7
50,000-75,000	9
75,000-100,000	11
>100,001	+1 per each 50,000 inhabitants or fraction greater than 25,000 +1 if total is an even number

District councillors (vocales) are elected at the rate of 3 in Municipal Districts with a population of up to 15,000, and 5, in districts with a population greater than 15,000.

=== Election method ===
The mayor is directly elected by popular vote. For the first time the choice of councilors will feature preferential voting, meaning that when citizens vote for a specific councilor candidate, this vote would be automatically counted towards that candidate's party and also towards the candidate for mayor of that same party. This system differs from previous elections, in which a closed list was used. The allocation of the total number of councilors to be chosen for each party/alliance will be determined by total votes received. This means all votes cast for mayor, for each of the councilors, and for each party/alliance will be added using open list proportional representation and the D'Hondt method. Candidates will be selected based on the position won according to the preference vote. Municipal District officials will be elected the same way.

=== Election system ===
After claims of irregularities with the automated voting system during the Simultaneous Primary in October 2019, the Central Electoral Board decided that this system would only be used in those municipalities whose number of councilors to elect would be eleven or more in addition to the municipality of Mao.

In total, the automated voting system was to be used in 18 municipalities across the country, while the remaining 140 municipalities would use the traditional manual voting system. The Municipal Districts will use the same method as the municipality to which they belong.

For the rescheduled date, the Central Electoral Board eliminated the automated voting option.

== Suspension of elections and national protests ==
In the early hours of February 16, Dominican citizens began approaching their designated sites to vote. Although polling places were scheduled to open nationwide at 7 am, delays began to be reported which led the president of the Central Election Board, Julio César Castaños Guzmán, to ask that citizens “have patience” as he indicated during a press conference at the board's headquarters that some “polling places may experience delays” in starting the electoral process.

At 11:11 am, Castaños Guzmán called for a second press conference to announce that elections would be suspended nationwide due to the widespread failure of the electronic voting system. He said that elections could not continue because the electoral ballot did not load properly in a majority of polling places in which the automated voting system was being used.

Issues with the automated voting system became known to the Central Electoral Board on the evening prior to the elections as the board's technical team was installing the voting machines. The issues were communicated to the Organization of American States, who was participating in the elections as part of a group of international observers, and to delegates from all political parties. The Central Electoral Board's technical team attempted to correct the issues by visiting the affected polling sites after 5PM on February 15 but were unable to correct them. José Ignacio Paliza, opposition leader and president of the Modern Revolutionary Party, was among first to report the technical issues were present as early as the night before the elections in heavily populated provinces and municipalities across the country, such as Puerto Plata, San Pedro, San Francisco de Macorís, San Cristóbal, and Santo Domingo Oeste. Paliza reported that the issues had not been resolved as of 6:10 am on the morning of the elections. Shortly after opening the polls, delegates from several parties began reporting problems at specific polling sites, indicating that the voting equipment failed to load the ballots fully. This meant certain candidate names, primarily of candidates from opposition parties, would not appear at all, making it impossible for their supporters to vote for them.

The automated voting system was to be used in 18 municipalities across the country, representing 62% of all registered voters, as these municipalities have the largest populations, while the remaining 140 municipalities would use the traditional manual voting system for 38% of registered voters.

== Protests ==
=== Dominican Republic ===
Shortly after the Central Electoral Board's announcement, groups of Dominican citizens, outraged with the electoral suspension itself and the lack of information regarding the causes behind the technical failure, took to the streets to protest against the Central Electoral Board. The peaceful protests began in Santo Domingo de Guzman and were initially concentrated at [The Flag Square], a monument dedicated to the Dominican flag which is located across from the main site of the Central Electoral Board. The protests have since extended to other locations across the country, and in cities around the world, led by the Dominican diaspora.

Some of the main issues raised by the protesters were the perceived collaboration between the electoral board and the current government, the use of national funds for the benefit of politicians and their families, and a generalized frustration with political corruption and impunity. Other issues addressed were the poor state of the country's public health and education systems, the privatization of protected areas, crime, and the weakened state of Dominican democracy. A majority of the protesters are young, educated, and represent various social classes. Many have taken to wearing black clothes and covering their faces with masks to protect their identity to avoid retaliation from the government.

Also at issue was the lack of information provided by the Central Electoral Board about the failures and a concern that the incident would not be investigated fully. This dissatisfaction led many protesters to call for the resignation of the current Central Electoral Board.

After the suspension, the Central Electoral Board began taking measures to contain the protests by increasing security around the building's perimeter as early as the morning following the suspended elections, when the first manifestation was expected to take place.

Repression of protesters intensified on Tuesday, as crowds grew larger at The Flag Square. Military agents were deployed to the area to support the National Police and on Tuesday evening, tear gas devices were detonated against the crowd. The move was criticized by the local and international press, the Central Electoral Board, opposition parties, and the government.

Although the country's security forces were quick to distance themselves from the incident, the Minister of Defense, Lieutenant General Ruben Paulio Sem, later confirmed that the tear gas devices were launched by a rogue military agent and were not authorized, as the protest had been organized and peaceful, there was no threatening activity, and the situation did not call for such a response. According to reports, protesters “took the time to pick up litter and clean up the plaza”, putting the trash “into organized trash bags” and have “urged each other to show respect to authorities, particularly local police”.

On February 24, the Dominican Government increased Dominican National Police and Dominican Army presence in the areas surrounding President Danilo Medina's residence in the Los Cacicazgos neighborhood, which is located near the Flag Square, the main site of the protest in Santo Domingo. On February 25, reports surfaced of protest repression, as pedestrians and cyclists carrying placards or wearing black clothes were prohibited from transiting freely on the street. Authorities were reported to have confiscated and destroyed protest signs.

=== Aftermath and investigation ===
After the suspension of the elections, the Central Electoral Board asked outside organizations to audit the voting system and an investigation is in process. The Organization of American States, the International Foundation for Electoral Systems and the Inter-American Union of Electoral Organizations (UNIORE) have agreed to perform an investigation into the elections.

On February 19, 2020, National Police spokesman Frank Félix Durán Mejía said that two individuals, police Col. Ramón Antonio Guzmán Peralta, who had been assigned as security detail to the presidential candidate of one of the opposition parties, Luis Abinader, and Manuel Antonio Regalado, a technician for the Claro telecommunications company, were detained for trying to sabotage the elections. Both individuals were interrogated and have since been released. A third individual alleged to be involved in the incident, Coronel Koji Maruyama, has not been questioned by authorities.

== Election schedule ==
Key dates relating primaries and the general election will be as follows:

Primaries

July 7, 2019	Pre-campaign starts.
August 22, 2019	Nominations for primaries close at 12:00.
October 6, 2019	Last date to hold parties primaries. Simultaneous primaries held on this day.
October 11, 2019	Last date to declare primaries results.
October 16, 2019	Last date to publish candidates names.
October 25, 2019	Last date to register candidates names in the Electoral Board.

General elections

November 3, 2019	Delivery of the Electoral Registry to political parties and programs to be use in counting process.
November 18, 2019	Last date for the Electoral Proclamation.
December 3, 2019	Last date for request of alliances and coalitions.
December 18, 2019	Last date for the presentation of independent candidates.
December 24, 2019	Approval of candidacies; Candidates' names publicised by electoral officers.
February 11, 2020	Facsimile publication of ballots in national circulation media.
February 16, 2020	Polling day — GENERAL MUNICIPAL ORDINARY ELECTIONS. Poll open from 07:00 to 17:00. CANCELLED DUE TO AUTOMATIC VOTING MACHINES FAILURE AND IRREGULARITIES.
March 15, 2020	Polling day — GENERAL MUNICIPAL EXTRAORDINARY ELECTIONS. Poll open from 07:00 to 17:00. Preliminary results will be available as soon as possible afterwards.
March 29, 2020	Official results declared

== Nominations ==
After the process for internal elections during the month of October, on November 8 the electoral campaign was formally opened and the electoral calendar began to run. The parties had to formally register their candidates during the first week of December 2019, each Municipal Electoral Board decided on December 11 on the admission or rejection of all candidacies.

For this election a total of 158 mayors and the same amount of vice mayors will be chosen; 1,164 councillors (regidores) and a similar amount of alternates; 235 directors, same proportion of deputy directors and 735 district councillors (vocales).

Women's quota and Youth quota

After that date, several complaints and legal complaints have been filed against the rejection of candidacies and, above all, changes in the composition of the ballots of the parties in relation to deputies and councilors, especially regarding the changes produced in those with the objective of complying the quota of women and the quota of youth. For this reason, the Central Electoral Board has not yet published the definitive list of candidates. The electoral law establishes a gender quota of no more than 60% and not less than 40%, for any gender, at the congressional and municipal levels, the municipal law previously established that the running mates of mayors and directors should be of the opposite gender.

On December 16, the Superior Electoral Court (Spanish: Tribunal Superior Electoral, TSE) presented a formula and urged that it be the basis as an example of how the woman's quota should be applied fairly, this formula was submitted on the occasion of rejecting the action initiated by Niurka M. Reyes Guzmán (PRM - El Seibo), a former pre-candidate for a deputy, the court understood that her fundamental rights had not been violated because in her demarcation there was only one position submitted to popular election during the primaries. Two days later, the TSE instituted a special and more agile procedure to hear the appeals for amparo and the challenges filed against the decisions of the Electoral Boards, during the first four days (from December 16 to 19) the total files deposited have amounted to 235.

On the other hand, according to the law, 10% of the candidates must be between 18 and 35 years of age, this provision known as the youth quota has not presented the same degree of disagreements or holders in the media, in fact, neither the JCE or the TSE has established any selection method, this is probably because Electoral Laws says its at national level, but the ambiguity of the law based on the levels of election will make the challenges more recurrent in the days to publish the candidates definitive list approaches.

== Opinion polls ==
=== National ===
Fieldwork date	Polling firm/Commissioner	Sample size	PLD	PRM				Others	Don't Know	Lead
15 Mar 2020	2020 extraordinary municipal elections	—	—	—	—	—	—	—	—	—
21–24 Feb 2020	CEC	1,500	27.3	53.2	0.9	0.5	6.3	1.6	–	25.9
16 Feb 2020	Municipal elections suspended on its original polling date due to irregularities with the automated voting system									
4–6 Feb 2020	SigmaDos	1,220	41.7	34.5	3.5	2.2	4.6	0.8	10.1	7.2
31 Jan–3 Feb 2020	CID Latinoamerica	1,203	43.0	35.0	4.0	2.0	6.0	–	–	8.0
18-20 Jan 2020	SigmaDos	1,243	39.5	35.7	–	–	–	–	–	3.8
15 May 2016	2016 municipal elections	—	35.7	24.4	7.8	12,1	0.4 (Note: Based on PTD performance.)	19.32	–	11.3

=== By municipality ===
==== Santo Domingo, DN ====
Fieldwork date	Polling firm/Commissioner	Sample size	Domingo Contreras PLD	Carolina Mejia PRM	Johnny Ventura FP	Others	Don't Know	Lead
15 Mar 2020	2020 extraordinary municipal elections	—	—	—	—	—	—	—
28 Feb-2 Mar 2020	Mark Penn/Stagwell	781	33.0	52.0	6.0	1.0	8.0	19.0
21-24 Feb 2020	Greenberg/Diario Libre	1,029	23.0	32.0	18.0	–	–	9.0
16 Feb 2020	Municipal elections suspended on its original polling date due to irregularities with the automated voting system							
1-3 Feb 2020	CEC	1,200	34.7	48.0	9.4	4.4	2.5	13.3
10-20 Jan 2020	SigmaDos	900	37.1	31.5	13.9	–	–	5.6
15 May 2016	2016 municipal elections	—	37.1 (Note: Includes 7.26% from Progressive Bloc alliance parties. Own party 29.84%)	56.6 (Note: Includes 11.60% from PRSC, 2.13% from DXC, 1.34% from PHD and 1.04% from Frente Amplio.) (Note: Within PRSC lead alliance. Own party 40.57%)	0.1 (Note: Based on PTD performance.) (Note: Part of PLD lead Progressive Bloc.)	6.2	–	19.5

==== Santiago de los Caballeros ====
Fieldwork date	Polling firm/Commissioner	Sample size	PLD	PRM			Others	Don't Know	Lead
15 Mar 2020	2020 extraordinary municipal elections	—	—	—	—	—	—	—	—
4-6 Mar 2020	Herrera, Almonte & Asociados	1,324	62.5	30.2	2.4	1.3	0.3	3.1	32.2
28 Feb-2 Mar 2020	Mark Penn/Stagwell	762	40.0	32.0	2.0	2.0	3.0	21.0	8.0
16 Feb 2020	Municipal elections suspended on its original polling date due to irregularities with the automated voting system								
3-7 Feb 2020	Herrera, Almonte & Asociados	1,307	70.4	22.0	3.9	1.8	0.5	–	48.4
10-20 Jan 2020	SigmaDos	800	64.0	26.3	–	–	–	–	37.7
15 May 2016	2016 municipal elections	—	53.4 (Note: Includes 6.54% from Progressive Bloc alliance parties. Own party 46.89%)	32.3 (Note: Includes 19.61% from PRSC, 0.90% from DXC and 0.72% from PHD. Own party 11.14%) (Note: Part of PRSC lead alliance.)	10.3 (Note: Includes 0.87% from PDI.)	32.3 (Note: Includes 11.14% from PRM, 0.90% from DXC and 0.72% from PHD. Own party 19.61%)	3.9	–	21.0

== Results ==
=== Overall ===
Party	Votes	%
Modern Revolutionary Party	1,432,714	41.71
Dominican Liberation Party	1,129,807	32.89
Dominican Revolutionary Party	143,429	4.18
Social Christian Reformist Party	123,548	3.60
People's Force	118,572	3.45
Dominicans for Change	55,850	1.63
Social Democratic Institutional Bloc	44,957	1.31
Dominican Humanist Party	35,213	1.03
Country Alliance	54,179	1.58
Broad Front	30,691	0.89
Civic Renovation Party	33,533	0.98
Alternative Democratic Movement	24,495	0.71
Liberal Reformist Party	24,004	0.70
Revolutionary Social Democratic Party	27,882	0.81
Alliance for Democracy	25,284	0.74
Liberal Action Party	14,438	0.42
Christian Democratic Union	17,839	0.52
Christian People's Party	15,920	0.46
People's Democratic Party	15,721	0.46
Quisqueyano Christian Democratic Party	10,858	0.32
Pais Possible	12,412	0.36
National Unity Party	7,369	0.21
Independent Revolutionary Party	8,449	0.25
National Progressive Force	7,723	0.22
National Citizen Will Party	6,521	0.19
Dominican Green Party	5,541	0.16
Institutional Democratic Party	4,099	0.12
Independent Movement, Unity and Progress	1,570	0.05
We for When? Political Community Movement	1,592	0.05
Eagle Political Movement	509	0.01
Nigua Independent Movement for Change	92	0.00
Total	3,434,811	100.00
Valid votes	3,434,811	94.85
Invalid/blank votes	186,355	5.15
Total votes	3,621,166	100.00
Registered voters/turnout	8,093,781	44.74
Source: JCE

=== City control ===
The following table lists the mayor changes in provincial capitals, as well as in municipalities of at least 50,000 inhabitants. The inauguration of the new municipal councils took place on April 24, 2020 unless otherwise noted.

Gains for a party are highlighted in that party's color. For official reasons a party gain is based on the party which won the municipality on the last election instead of the outgoing mayor current affiliation, additionally, the incoming mayor listed party depends on the party that lead the alliance (if existed) in that specific location, this means an alliance may have various parties listed as incoming instead of just the national mayor party of that alliance. Outgoing mayors marked with an asterisk (*) are not seeking reelection in 2020.

Municipality	Population	Outgoing mayor	Party	Elected mayor	Party
Santo Domingo	1,402,749	David Collado*	PRM	Carolina Mejía de Garrigó	PRM
Santo Domingo Este	1,035,576	Alfredo Martinez*	PLD	Manuel Jimenez	PRM
Santiago de los Caballeros	1,000,087	Abel Martínez Durán	PLD	Abel Martínez Durán	PLD
Santo Domingo Norte	785,263	Rene Polanco*	PLD	Carlos Guzmán	PLD
Santo Domingo Oeste	742,062	Francisco Peña	PRD	Jose Andujar	PRM
San Felipe de Puerto Plata	330,783	Walter Musa	PLD	Roquelito Garcia	PRM
Salvaleón de Higüey	322,266	Karen Aristy Cedeño	PLD	Rafael Duluc	BIS
Los Alcarrizos	302,102	Danilo Rafael Santos	PRD	Cristian Encarnación	PRM
San Pedro de Macorís	263,077	Ramon Echavarria	PRD	Raymundo Rafael Ortiz	PRM
Concepción de La Vega	253,919	Kelvin Cruz	PRM	Kelvin Cruz	PRM
San Cristóbal	240,705	Jose Nelson Guillen	PLD	Jose Montas	PRM
San Francisco de Macorís	213,906	Antonio Diaz Paulino*	PRM	Siquio Ng de la Rosa	PRM
La Romana	207,784	Jose Ramon Reyes*	PLD	Jose Antonio Adames	PRSC
Moca	186,225	Angel Lopez	PRM	Miguel Guarocuya	PLD
Boca Chica	162,633	Carolina Denis*‡	PCR	Fermin Brito	PLD
San Juan de la Maguana	156,583	Hanoi Sanchez	PRSC	Hanoi Sanchez	PRSC
Cotuí	154,343	Teresa Ynoa Soriano	PLD	Bienvenido Lazala Fabian	PRM
Baní	145,595	Nelson Camilo Landestoy	PRD	Santo Ramirez	PRM
Bonao	142,984	Jose Dario Rodriguez*	PRM	Eberto Núñez	PRM
Bajos de Haina	142,322	Osvaldo Rodriguez Estevez	PRM	Osvaldo Rodriguez Estevez	PRM
Santa Cruz de Barahona	138,470	Noel Octavio Subervi	PRD	Mictor Fernandez de la Cruz	PRM
Azua de Compostela	125,487	Rafael Hidalgo Fernandez	PLD	Ruddy Gonzalez	PRM
San Antonio de Guerra	125,412	Marcia Rosario Torres	PAL	Cesar Rojas	PRM
Santa Cruz de Mao	117,481	Odalis Rodriguez	PRM	Odalis Rodriguez	PRM
Nagua	117,195	Alfredo Rafael Peralta	PRM	Alfredo Rafael Peralta	PRM
Pedro Brand	110,005	Ramon Gomez Abreu	PRD	Wilson Paniagua Encarnacion	PRM
Villa Hermosa	108,563	Freddy Johnson Castillo	PRSC	Favio Antonio Noel	PRM
Villa Altagracia	100,252	Edwin Ferreira*	PRM	Jose Miguel Mendez	PLD
Las Matas de Farfán	92,232	Jose Valenzuela	PRSC	Jose de la Cruz Gonzalez	PLD
Santa Bárbara de Samaná	90,233	Nelson Antonio Nuñez	PRM	Nelson Antonio Nuñez	PRM
Santa Cruz de El Seibo	87,071	Juan Reinaldo Valera*	PRM	Leo Francis Zorrilla Ramos	PRM
Constanza	82,212	Ambiorix Sanchez*	PLD	Juan Agustin Luna Lora	PRM
Tamboril	79,522	Anyolino Germosen	PLD	Anyolino Germosen	PLD
Jarabacoa	78,522	Carlos Jose Sanchez Pineda	PRSC	Yunior Torres Ayala	PRSC
Puñal	77,562	Miguel Rolando Fernandez	MIUP	Jose Enrique Romero	PRM
San José de Ocoa	75,424	Milciades Aneudy Ortiz Sajiun	PRD	Milciades Aneudy Ortiz Sajiun	PLD
Hato Mayor del Rey	73,558	Odalis Encarnacion Vega	PRSC	Amado de la Cruz	PRM
San Víctor	72,320	Leonardo Estrella Guzman*	PLD	Fulgencio Sanchez Jorge	PRM
San Ignacio de Sabaneta	71,217	Willian Rafael Torres	PRD	Felix Alberto Marte Bueno	PRM
Yamasá	69,192	Hermes Rosario Rosario	PLD	Ramon Bisono Rodriguez	PRM
Esperanza	68,522	Ana Jacqueline Peña Sanchez	PRSC	Freddy de Jesus Rodriguez Jimenez	PRM
San José de las Matas	68,212	Roberto Espinal	PLD	Alfredo Reyes	PRSC
Licey al Medio	64,522	Miguel Paulino	PRD	Miguel Paulino	PLD
Salcedo	62,643	Maria Ortiz Dilone	PRD	Maria Ortiz Dilone	PLD
Neiba	62,345	Eliferbo Herasme Diaz*	PRSC	Jose Dario Cepeda	PLD
Monte Plata	60,957	Jesus Antonio Contreras	PLD	Mercedes Herrera Vasquez	PRM
Villa González	59,321	Cesar Alvarez	PRM	Cesar Alvarez	PRM
Jánico	58,521	Hilario Fernandez	PLD	Hilario Fernandez	PLD
Villa Bisonó	55,523	Leonardo Antonio Bueno	PRM	Leonardo Antonio Bueno	PRM
Guayubín	50,251	Cesar Humberto Breton	PRM	Ramon Francisco Toribio	PLD
San Rafael del Yuma	50,023	Francisco Rodriguez Aponte	PRM	Francisco Rodriguez Aponte	PRM
San Fernando de Monte Cristi	47,132	Luis Mendez Reyes	PRD	Rafael Jesus Jerez	PLD
Comendador	43,671	Israel Aquino Montero	PLD	Julio Altagracia Nuñez Perez	PRM
Dajabón	40,687	Miguel Cruz Jimenez*	BIS	Santiago Riveron Arias	PRM
Pedernales	40,513	Luis Manuel Feliz Matos	MODA	Andres Emilio Jimenez Sanchez	PRM
Jimaní	19,263	Fernando Ramon Novas*	PLD	Dionisys Mendez Volquez	PLD

== See also ==
- Timeline of 2020 Dominican Republic Municipal Election Protests
