= Presidential Security Corps (Dominican Republic) =

- Spanish: Cuerpo de Seguridad Presidencial
- Active: 1929 - 2013 (Assistant Corps), 2013 - Present (CUSEP)
- Allegiance: Dominican Republic
- Role: Executive protection
- Size: At least 550 members
- Part of: Ministry of Defense (Dominican Republic)
- Garrison/HQ: Santo Domingo
- Website: Pagina oficial del Cuerpo de Seguridad Presidencial de Republica Dominicana

Commanders
- Current commander: Brigadier General Jimmy Arias Grullón

The Presidential Security Corps (CUSEP, Spanish: Cuerpo de Seguridad Presidencial) is a Specialized Security Corps of the Dominican military responsible for the safety and personal protection of the President of the Dominican Republic, the Vice President, their immediate family members, former Presidents and Vice Presidents, and visiting dignitaries and heads of state. The unit is jointly composed of members of the Dominican armed forces and the National Police.

== History ==
CUSEP was created on June 7, 1929 by direction of then President Horacio Vásquez and was originally given the name of the Assistant Corps (Spanish: Cuerpo Ayudante).

In 1947, the organization was reorganized as the Corps of Military Assistants.

In September of 2013, the Congress of the Dominican Republic again re-organized the Corps under its current name.

== Organization ==
The existence of certain sub-component units within CUSEP have been publicly acknowledged by the Dominican government, including the following.

Unit Identifier	Unit Name (English)	Unit Name (Spanish)
S-1	Directorate of Human Resources	Dirección de Recursos Humanos
S-2	Directorate of Intelligence	Dirección de Inteligencia
S-5	Purchasing and Contracting Department	Departamento de Compras y Contrataciones

The identity and purpose of units S-3 and S-4 are unclear. Additionally, there are known to be units responsible for Public Relations, Psychology, and K-9 operations.

== Authority ==
The Corps derives its current organization, mission, and authorities from Article 56 of the Organic Law of the Armed Forces.

== Embezzlement Accusations ==
On April 24, 2021, the Attorney General of the Dominican Republic and the Special Prosecutor’s Office for the Persecution of Administrative Corruption announced the arrest of General Adan B. Cáceres Silvestre, the chief of CUSEP from 2012 to 2020 under an anti-corruption investigation code-named Operation Coral. General Cáceres is one of 48 individuals charged with involvement in a network which allegedly abused their authority to embezzle over four billion pesos from the Dominican state.
