= Francisco Seixas da Costa =

Portuguese diplomat

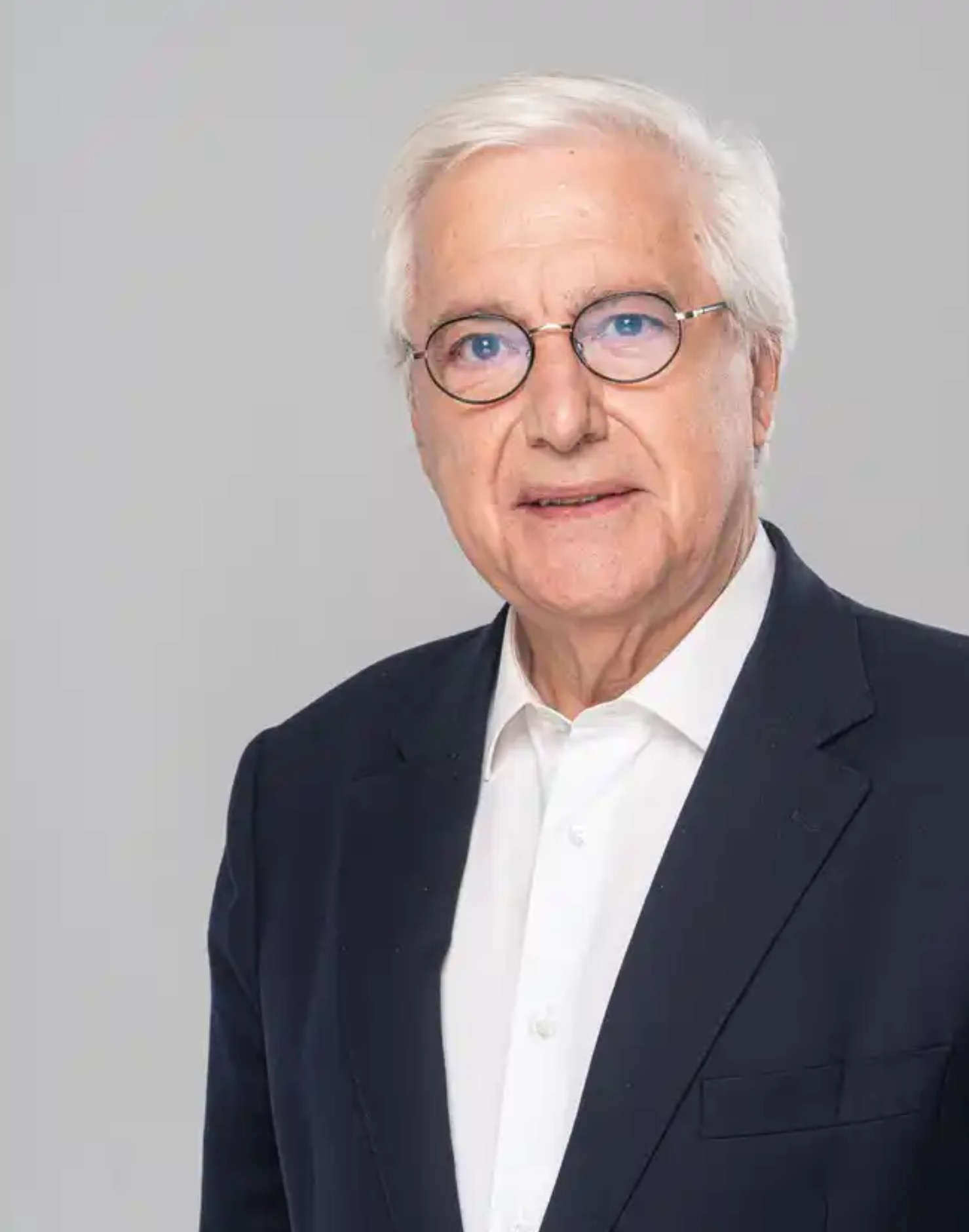
Francisco Seixas da Costa

Francisco Seixas da Costa, GCC, CMG,(Vila Real, 1948) is a retired Portuguese diplomat. He was also a member of two Portuguese governments.

He currently works as a strategic consultant in private sector companies and media commentator on international affairs.

== Early life and education ==
Francisco Seixas da Costa was born in Vila Real, Portugal. He holds a degree in Social and Political Sciences from the University of Lisbon. He started his professional life working in a bank and in an advertising company.

During his compulsory military service, as an army officer, he played an active role in the April 25th Revolution of 1974, serving as an adviser to the National Salvation Junta.

== Diplomatic and political life ==
Francisco Seixas da Costa entered the Portuguese diplomatic service in 1975 and was subsequently posted to the Portuguese embassies in Oslo (1979–1982), Luanda (1982–1986) and London (1990–1994).

Within the Portuguese Ministry of Foreign Affairs, he held various senior positions.

Between 1995 and 2001, he served as Secretary of State for European Affairs in two Portuguese governments headed by António Guterres. In this role, he was Portugal’s chief negotiator for the Treaties of Amsterdam and Nice , chaired the Committee of Ministers of the Schengen Agreement (1997), the EU Internal Market Council (2000) and coordinated the Portuguese Presidency of the European Union in 2000.

He returned to his diplomatic career in 2001, having been appointed as the Permanent Representative Ambassador to the United Nations, in New York (2001–2002). He then served as Vice-President of the Economic and Social Council – ECOSOC (2001), as Chair of the Economic and Financial Committee of the 56th General Assembly) (2001–2002) was elected Vice-President of the 57th General Assembly (2002). At the invitation of Secretary-General Kofi Annan, he joined the board of the UNFIP - United Nation Fund for International Partnerships (2001–2002).

From 2002 to 2013, he successively held the positions of Ambassador and Permanent Representative of Portugal to the Organization for Security and Co-operation in Europe (Vienna, 2002–2004), during the Portuguese presidency of the organization, as Ambassador to Brazil (2004–2008) and as Ambassador to France (2009–2013) concurrently accredited to UNESCO (2012–2013) and Monaco (2010–2013).

He later served as Executive Director of the North–South Centre of the Council of Europe (2013–2014).

== Life after retirement ==
Upon retiring from public service in 2013, Francisco Seixas da Costa joined several leading Portuguese companies, including Jerónimo Martins, Mota‑Engil, EDP Renewables, Tabaqueira–Philip Morris, and Kearney Portugal.

== Current activities ==
Francisco Seixas da Costa is member of the board of directors of Mota-Engil and chairs the supervisory board of Tabaqueira - Phillip Morris Portugal and the advisory board of Kearney Portugal.

He serves as Chairman of the think tank “Club of Lisbon – Global Challenges”.

Since 2020, he has been a member of "Observare", the research center for international relations at the Autonomous University of Lisbon .

Since 2009, he has been writing daily a general-interest blog - "Duas ou Três Coisas".

== Honours ==
=== National ===
- Grand Cross of the Order of Christ (9 June 2004)
- Grand Officer of the Order of Merit (27 April 1993)
- Officer of the Order of Prince Henry (19 April 1986)

=== Foreign ===
- Poland - Commander with Star of the Order of Merit, 22 September 1997
- France - Grand Officer of the National Order of Merit, 29 November 1999
- Romania - Grand Cross of the Order of the Star, 2000
- Greece - Grand Cross of the Order of Honor, 17 March 2000
- Spain, Grand Cross of the Order of Civil Merit, 25 September 2000
- Belgium - Grand Cross of the Order of Leopold II, 9 October 2000
- Brazil - Grand Cross of the National Order of the Southern Cross, 4 December 2008

== Bibliography ==
- Diplomacia Europeia - Instituições, Alargamento e o Futuro da União [European Diplomacy - the institutions, the enlargement and the future of the Union], Lisbon, 2002;
- Uma Segunda Opinião - Notas de Política Externa e Diplomacia [A Second Opinion - Notes on External Policy and Diplomacy], Lisbon, 2006;
- As Vésperas e a Alvorada de Abril [The vespers and the April dawn], Brasília, 2007;
- Tanto Mar? - Portugal, o Brasil e a Europa [So much sea? - Portugal, Brazil and Europe], Brasília, 2008.
- Apontamentos [Notes], Lisbon, 2008.
- A Cidade Imaginária [An Imaginary City], Vila Real, 2021.
- Antes que me esqueça - a diplomacia e a vida [Before I forget - Diplomacy and Life], Lisbon, 2023.

He was co-author of several dozen books on diplomacy and European and international affairs.
