= Economic and Social Council (Dominican Republic) =

Government advisory body

- Consejo Económico y Social

Advisory body overview
- Formed: August 12, 2015; 10 years ago
- Jurisdiction: Dominican Republic Government
- Headquarters: Bolivar Avenue at Abraham Lincoln Avenue, Pontificia Universidad Católica Madre y Maestra Santo Domingo
- Advisory body executive: Monsignor Agripino Núñez Collado, President
- Parent department: Executive Branch of the Government of the Dominican Republic

The Economic and Social Council (Spanish: Consejo Económico y Social, CES) of the Dominican Republic is an advisory entity permanently ascribed to the Executive Branch of the Government of the Dominican Republic. It is responsible for advising the government on economic, social, and labor matters with a goal to construct and strengthen social peace.

The CES coordinates its functions and administrative tasks with the Ministry of Economy, Planning, and Development and is connected to the Ministry of Labor.

The CES is currently composed of a President, a Secretary General, and 41 counsellors representing various business, social, and labor sectors. Although the law requires that there should be an equal number of counsellors (fifteen) from each sector, the CES has twenty five counsellors representing business entities (61%), seven counsellors representing labor and union interests (17%), and nine counsellors representing social groups (22%), including religious entities and private universities.

The counsellors are appointed by their own sectors every four years through an election process with participation from each sector. The President and Secretary General are appointed by the Executive Branch of the Dominican government.

== Headquarters ==
The CES headquarters are located in the main administrative building of the Pontificia Universidad Católica Madre y Maestra in Santo Domingo. The current president of the CES, Monsignor Agripino Núñez Collado, served as rector of the Pontificia Universidad Católica Madre y Maestra until 2014.

== Functions ==
As established in the Constitution, the Council's main responsibilities are to serve as an advisory body to the Executive Branch of the Dominican Republic about economic, social, and labor matters. Law #142-15 further delineates the entity's functions as below:

- Examine and study social, economic, and labor issues that affect Dominican society.
- Examine and study bills of laws related to social, economic, and labor policies that could affect Dominican society upon request of the President of the Dominican Republic, the Ministry of Economy, Planning, and Development, and the Ministry of Labor.
- Seek appropriate agreements through democratic participation of employers, workers, and organizations within society.
- Achieve consensus through social dialogue that allow the incorporation, through social agreements and pacts, of initiatives that encourage economic, social, and labor development.
- Propose legal initiatives to the Executive Branch that are related to economic, social, and labor policies.
- Issue opinions on bills of law and laws, decrees, or ordinances related to the CES and that could affect their organization, competencies, or functions.
- Upon request of the Executive Branch, its ministries, or upon the CES's own initiative, perform research studies that relate to economic, social, and labor policies.
- Regulate the CES's own internal organization and functioning, according to current legislation and in concert with the ministries of Economy, Planning, and Development and Public Administration.
- Create and submit to the Executive Branch a report on the socioeconomic and labor situation of the country within the first forty five (450 days of each calendar year.
- When necessary, issue an opinion on the creation and execution of the annual, multi-year, and complementary budgets which shall be sent to the Council of Ministries by the Economy, Planning, and Development.
- Coordinate all concertation initiatives related to the CES scope of competence.
- Follow up on the fulfillment of validated pacts and agreements within the CES's scope of competence.
- Issue a report at the end of each calendar year on compliance with the social agreements reached and regulations passed that relate to the CES scope of competence.
- Coordinate social participation in the process of monitoring and evaluation of the National Development Strategy, as mandated by relevant laws.
- Promote social oversight, accountability, and compliance with the National Development Strategy.
- Participate in the annual mid-term and term reviews, with regards to progress, achievements, difficulties, and challenges that may arise in the implementation of the National Development Strategy in accordance with the provisions of the law.
- Prepare for elected authorities, within the framework of the medium-term reports of the National Development Strategy and when applicable, conclusions and recommendations on: i) the adoption of new measures and the implementation of actions to correct deviations with respect to the established goals or unforeseen impacts of the policies adopted; ii) objectives and lines of action

== Main bodies ==
=== President ===
The President of the CES is designated by the President of the Dominican Republic for a four-year term that can be renewed consecutively only once. The President is the primary link with the Executive Branch and is responsible for coordinating the work of the CES, convene meetings of the Plenum and the Executive Commission, sign all acts and make public all agreements that are of public interest, and is the official spokesperson for the CES.

=== Plenum ===
The Plenum of the Council is composed of all its members, under the direction of the President and assisted by the Secretary General.

=== Secretary General ===
The Secretary General is responsible for monitoring and providing technical support to the work of the CES and ensuring the administrative management of the CES. During Plenum meetings, the Secretary has a voice, but without vote.

=== Executive Commission ===
The Executive Commission is the management and operations entity of the CES, jointly with the President and Secretary General. It is composed of three members from each sector—business, labor, and social, and are elected by simple majority for a period of two years by the Plenum.

== Members ==
- Monsignor Agripino Núñez Collado, president
- Dr. Iraima Capriles, executive director

Executive Commission

- Monsignor Agripino Núñez Collado, president
- Dr. Iraima Capriles, executive director
- Pedro Brache, counsellor, business sector
- Leonel Castellanos Duarte, counsellor, business sector
- Rafael Abreu, counsellor, labor sector
- Xiomara Guante, counsellor, labor sector
- Rev. Fidel Lorenzo Merán, counsellor, social sector
- Rolando Guzmán, counsellor, social sector

Counsellors – Business sector

- Pedro Brache
- Fermín Acosta
- David Fernandez
- José Manuel Vicente
- Luis Concepción
- Joel Santos
- Federico Domínguez
- Campos de Moya
- Leonel Castellanos Duarte
- Bredyg Disla
- Ramón Báez
- Saúl Abreu
- Lina García
- Marco Cabral
- Iván García
- Marcionilo Castillo
- Miguel Dauhajre
- José Manuel López Valdés
- Francisco Melo
- Julio de Beras
- Ivonne García
- Issaachart Burgos
- Freddy Antonio Díaz
- Alejandro Nouel
- Guillermo Julián

Counsellors – Labor sector

- Rafael Abreu
- Gabriel del Río
- Jacobo Ramos
- Mayra Jiménez
- Manolo Ramírez
- Xiomara Guante
- Wilson Roa

Counsellors – Social sector

- Rev. P. José Joaquín Domínguez
- Rev. Fidel Lorenzo Merán
- Servio Tulio Castaños Guzmán
- Miriam Díaz Santana
- Emma Polanco
- Rolando Guzmán
- Nicanor Soriano
- David Luther
- Roque Feliz

== Controversies ==
=== Punta Catalina Bid Process Investigation ===
In 2017, Dominican president Danilo Medina designated by decree the formation of a special commission, led by the CES, to investigate the bidding process for the construction of the Punta Catalina Coal Thermoelectric Plant. The plant's bidding process and eventual construction was part of a large-scale corruption and bribery scheme coordinated by Brazilian construction company Odebrecht and executed throughout Latin America.

In addition to members of the CES, the investigative commission included members of various business organizations, some with deep links to the government, electric sector experts, media organizations, and religious and labor leaders. The commission was tasked with providing a report to communicate the results of the investigation and provide to the relevant authorities any information that could lead to judicial consequences for those involved in the bribery scheme.

Despite overwhelming evidence of bribery, irregularities, and corruption in the bidding process for the coal plant, the CES's findings, supported by results provided by an independent auditing firm, concluded that overvaluation in the construction of the plant could not be verified and that the bidding process followed Dominican law. The findings that were made public in July 2017, six months after the commission was established, also concluded that the commission was “not competent” to determine whether bribery took place in the bidding process. These findings led to the establishment of national protest movement Green March which demanded transparency and an independent judicial investigation into the Punta Catalina bidding process. Specifically, Green March leaders accused the commission led by CES of contravening the rule of law and assisting with the cover-up of criminal activity on behalf of the presidency of Danilo Medina and against the Dominican people.

Green March protests took place in the Summer of 2017 in several municipalities across the Dominican Republic and in cities around the world, led by the Dominican diaspora.

Opposition parties were also critical of the commission's findings, considering these to be partial towards the government and protective of the interests of Odebrecht. They also indicated that some of the commission's recommendations could not be implemented as they contradicted Dominican law.

Two years later, in July 2019, a member of the CES-led commission revealed that bribery did take place during the approval of Odebrecht’s contract in the Dominican National Congress. According to Persio Maldonado, president of the Dominican Society of Newspapers, these bribery accusations were known to the CES-led commission but were not included in the investigation as they did not fit into the narrow scope, established by presidential decree, which was limited to investigating irregularities in the bidding and construction process.

=== 2020 Elections National Dialogue ===
On February 27, the CES offered to mediate a dialogue to be held in March to resolve the political and electoral crisis that erupted after the suspended municipal elections of February. With this initiative, the CES expressed a wish to help preserve the country's "political, social, and institutional stability" by leading a conversation between the major political parties in the country.

The CES made their intentions to moderate the dialogue public after former Dominican president Hipolito Mejia proposed Monsignor Núñez Collado as a suitable mediator for the crisis.

Shortly after the announcement, the CES was heavily criticized by diverse social sectors and political parties for its intended involvement in the dialogue. According to critics, including members of opposition parties and demonstrators who took to the streets to protest the suspended elections, the CES's very nature as a government entity that operates under the Executive branch of the Dominican government, as well as it stated mission to promote dialogue on “economic, social, and labor matters”, renders it ineligible to lead or mediate a dialogue meant to address electoral and political issues.

Cacerolazo protests led by demonstrators from various social and political groups erupted on March 4, the first day of the dialogue, at the site of the meeting and CES headquarters in the administrative building of the Pontificia Universidad Católica Madre y Maestra in Santo Domingo.

The meeting was suspended due to the disruption caused by the protests and an internal disagreement between members of the dialogue over the inclusion of a representative of the Dominican Revolutionary Party, whose political alliance with the governing Dominican Liberation Party would have caused an over-representation in a meeting that was meant to provide equal representation for all political movements.

The dialogue continued on March 6, after an invitation was extended to representatives of the demonstrators to participate in the meeting as an observer and the internal impasse over the PRD's attendance was resolved. A spokesperson who attended the meeting on behalf of the protesting groups left the meeting after giving a brief statement in which they rejected the invitation as an observer as insufficiently meaningful. The group also communicated the creation of a national dialogue to take place the same evening in which all citizen groups, political parties, and entities would be allowed to participate.

== See also ==
- Ministries of the Dominican Republic
- Politics of the Dominican Republic
