= Armed Forces of the Dominican Republic =

Combined military forces of the Dominican Republic

- Fuerzas Armadas de la República Dominicana (Spanish)
- Emblem of the Dominican Armed Forces

- Banner of the Dominican Armed Forces
- Motto: Todo por la Patria ("All for the homeland")
- Founded: 27 February 1844; 182 years ago
- Current form: 6 November 1944; 81 years ago
- Service branches: Dominican Army; Dominican Navy; Dominican Air Force
- Headquarters: Ministry of Defense Building, Santo Domingo, Dominican Republic
- Website: www.mide.gob.do (in Spanish)

Leadership
- Commander-in-chief: Luis Abinader
- Minister of Defense: Carlos Antonio Fernández Onofre

Personnel
- Active personnel: 89,000
- Reserve personnel: 189,000

Expenditure
- Budget: $1.1 billion (2025)
- Percent of GDP: 0.72% (2024)

Industry
- Foreign suppliers: Belgium; Brazil; Czech Republic; France; Israel; Spain; Sweden; United States; Former: Taiwan

Related articles
- History: Dominican War of Independence; Dominican Restoration War; Dominican Civil War; 2003 invasion of Iraq
- Ranks: Military ranks of the Dominican Republic

The Dominican Armed Forces (Spanish: Fuerzas Armadas Dominicanas), also referred as Armed Forces of the Dominican Republic (Spanish: Fuerzas Armadas de la República Dominicana), are the military forces of the Dominican Republic. These are made up of three branches: the Army, the Navy and the Air Force. The president of the Republic is the commander in chief of the Dominican Armed Forces and the Ministry of Defense of the Dominican Republic (Spanish: Ministerio de Defensa de la República Dominicana) is the chief managing body of the armed forces.

As a Ministry, its origin comes from the Dominican Constitution of 1844, as the Secretary of State for War and Navy. Its ministerial headquarters is located in Santo Domingo, in the Plaza de la Bandera. The primary missions of the Armed Forces of the Dominican Republic are to defend the nation and protect the territorial integrity of the country.

The Army consists of six infantry brigades, an air cavalry squadron and a combat service support brigade. The Air Force operates two main bases, one in southern region near Santo Domingo and one in the northern region of the country, the air force operates approximately 75 aircraft including helicopters. The Navy maintains three ageing vessels which were donated from the United States, around 25 patrol crafts and interceptor boats and two helicopters.

There is a counter-terrorist group formed by members of the three branches. This group is highly trained in counter-terrorism missions. The armed forces participate fully in counter-illegal drug trade efforts, for this task, there is a taskforce known as DEPROSER 24/7 (DEfender, PROteger y SERvir). They also are active in efforts to control contraband and illegal immigration from Haiti to the Dominican Republic and from the Dominican Republic to the United States (via illegal transportation of immigrants to Puerto Rico).

The Drone Unit of the Intelligence Directorate of the Joint Staff (J-2) operates surveillance drones (Hovermast 150, DJI Matrice 210, and DJI Mavic) for border surveillance against illegal crossings from Haiti since 2018.

== History ==
=== War of Independence ===
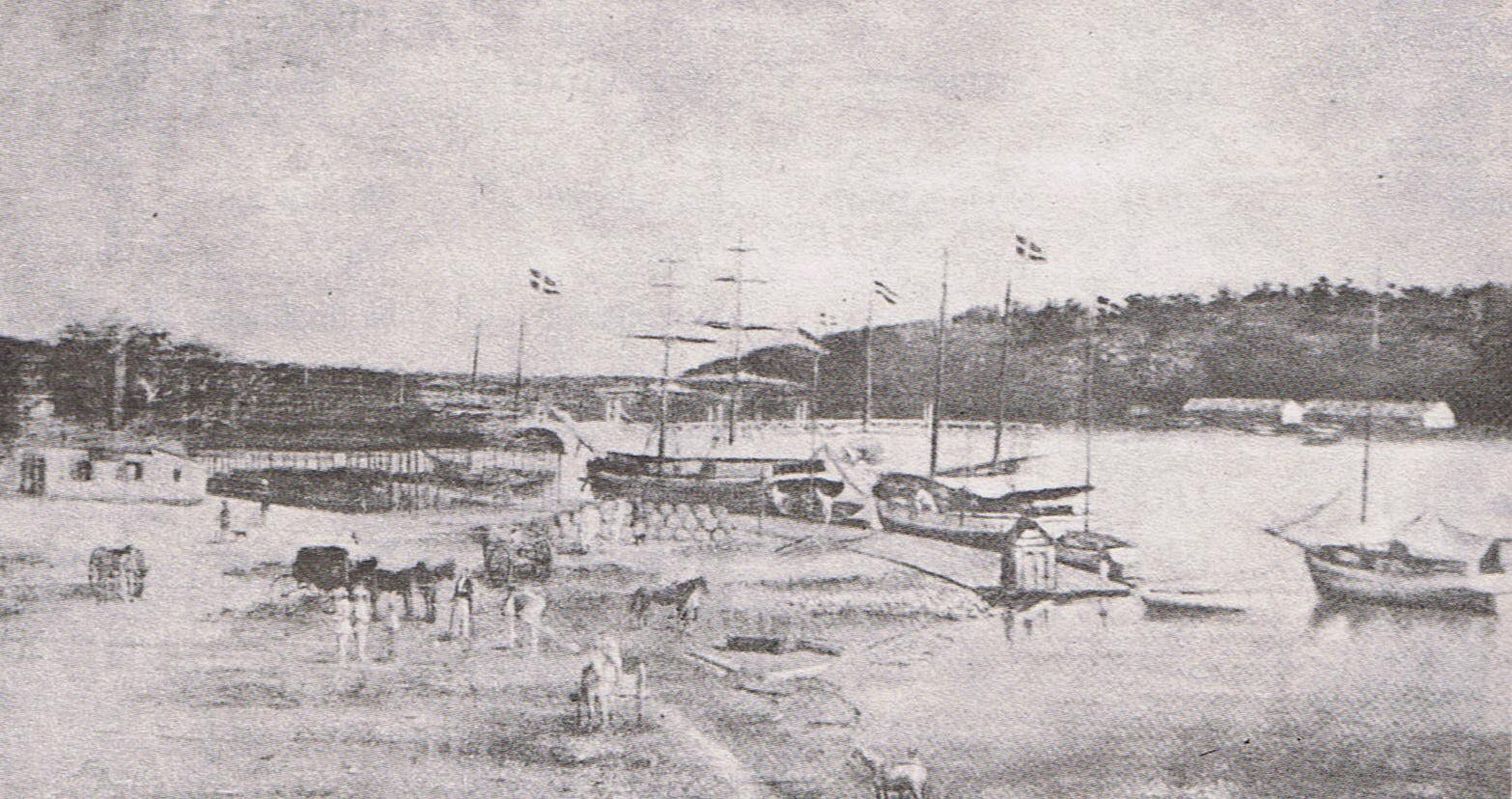
Brigantine Schooners in Santo Domingo circa 1850

Haiti had invaded and occupied the Dominican Republic from 1822 to 1844. The military forces of the First Republic's army comprised about 4,000 soldiers organized into seven line infantry regiments, several loose battalions, 6 cavalry squadrons and 3 artillery brigades. This army was supplemented by the national civic guard militia and the National Naval Armada, which was the original name of the Navy today. In addition to the aforementioned military corps, there were two expeditionary armies. The Southern was led by Pedro and Ramon Santana in Hato Mayor and El Seibo, whereas the Northern Borders expeditionary army was led by Major General Francisco A. Salcedo.

=== 20th century ===
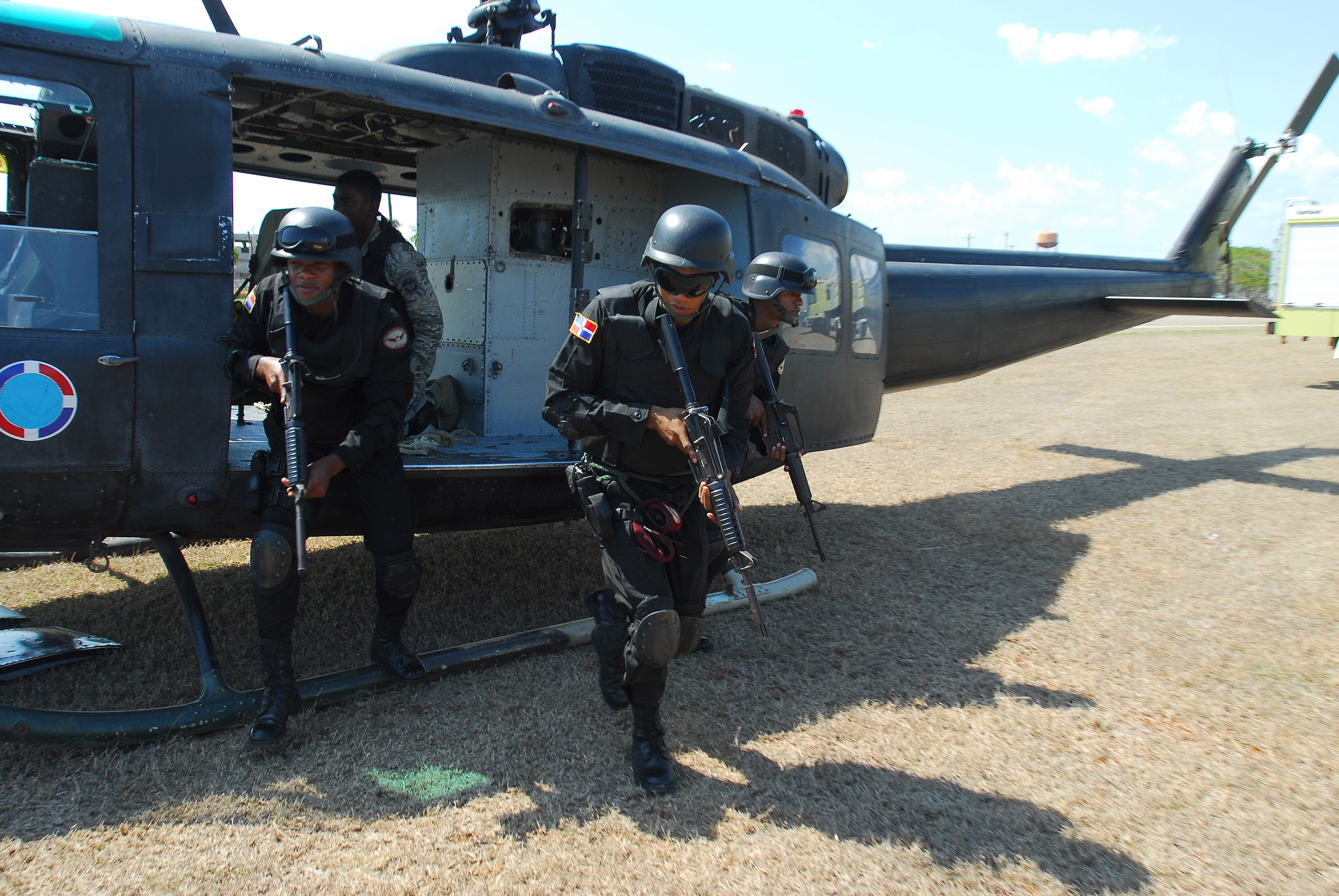
3 Dominican Republic Special Forces operators armed with M4 carbines got out of a Bell UH-1 Iroquois military helicopter in counter-terrorist and counter-illegal drug trade operations

The United States military intervention of 1916 briefly brought about the disappearance of an independent military structure in the Dominican Republic. The military government was headed by Captain William Knapp, who made an interim police force called the Constabulary, which was responsible for maintaining internal order and implementing the provisions of the US government. The purely police function of this body disappeared in 1917, leading to the creation of a National Guard. The National Guard inherited a hierarchical and organizational structure akin to the US Marine Corps, which served as the basis for the modern armed forces. It is made up of three components: one terrestrial, one naval, and one air.

This land component, now called the National Army, inherited its organizational structure from the National Guard organized by the US occupation forces, which operated from April 7, 1917, until June 1921, when it became the Dominican National Police by Executive Order No. 631 of Rear Admiral Thomas Snowden. After the end of the US military occupation in 1924, Horacio Vásquez won the presidential elections of that same year. Among his first decisions was to decree the change of the Dominican National Police to the National Brigade. The name changed again on 17 May 1928 to the National Army.

Due to the demand for presence throughout the country, posts and detachments in different parts of the country were created, with some provinces hosting company-size units to this day. Under President Trujillo, many of these units, posts and detachments became part of the National Police and assisted in, the policing role. So great was the influence that had the National Guard in Dominican society and very particularly among the rural population that even today many Dominican often refer to the Armed Forces, especially the Army, as "The Guard."

The Navy has experienced only two name changes since its inception. It has gradually evolved from a body created for traditional military purposes to a component mainly responsible for enforcing the provisions on navigation, trade and fishing, as well as international treaties.

The Air Force, meanwhile, emerged as an independent component in 1948, under the chairmanship of Generalissimo Rafael L. Trujillo Molina. Trujillo valued the capacity to project military power in the Caribbean and ensured that it was one of the best-equipped air forces in the region in the 1950s. He saw the Air Force as a cornerstone against any invasion or subversion against his dictatorship.

== Components ==
Badge of the Dominican Army

=== Army of the Dominican Republic ===
The Dominican Army was founded in 1844. Its basic strength is concentrated in light infantry, which in general can be said to be well equipped with basic combat rifles and combat equipment for soldiers. The vehicles, both transport and armored, and the artillery and anti-tank pieces that it has in service, are partly in poor condition, obsolete or simply civilian vehicles adapted for military use. Nowadays, tanks and modern armor systems have been included.

Badge of the Dominican Navy

=== Navy of the Dominican Republic ===
The Dominican Navy was founded in 1844 also with the National Independence with 15,000 troops after Haiti had occupied the eastern part of the island for twenty five years. It keeps around 34 ships in operation, mostly coast guards, patrol boats and small speedboats. It also operates dredges, tugboats and patrol boats of height. The Navy has a small air body composed of Bell OH-58 Kiowa utility helicopters.

The Dominican Navy operates two main bases, one in the port of Santo Domingo in the Dominican capital called "Naval Base 27 de Febrero" and another in Bahía de las Calderas, in the province of Peravia, called "Las Calderas Naval Base" in the southern part from the country. It also has presence in the commercial ports of the country, comandancias of ports and is divided into three naval areas that in turn have posts and naval detachments.

Badge of the Dominican Air Force

=== Air Force of the Dominican Republic ===
The Dominican Air Force was founded in 1948 with 20,000 people. It has two main bases: the base area of San Isidro in the South-Central zone of the country near the capital city Santo Domingo; and the other operates jointly in the civil facilities belonging to the Gregorio Luperón International Airport, near the city of Puerto Plata in the North of the Republic. Until August 2009, the possibility of starting military operations from the María Montez airport, in the city of Barahona in the Southwest of the country and from the Punta Cana airport in the extreme east is under study.

It keeps the following fixed-wing aircraft in operation: 8 Embraer EMB 314 Super Tucano, 3 CASA C-212 Aviocar transport; 6 T35B Pilot training; as well as around 25 helicopters such as Bell 206, Bell UH-1 Iroquois, Bell OH-58 Kiowa, Eurocopter Dauphin, OH-6 Cayuse and Sikorsky S-300.

== Specialized Security Corps ==
Specialized Corps for Airport Security and Civil Aviation

The Specialized Security Corps are military security agencies dependent on the Ministry of Defense and they are made up of military and civilian personnel specialized in their different areas of function. Overall their duty is to support state institutions, defend national interests in peace and war, and as force multipliers of the Armed Forces as well as the National Police.

Anti-Terrorist Command of the Dominican Armed Forces

- Antiterrorism Command of the Dominican Armed Forces
- National Intelligence Directorate (DNI)
- Airport Security and Civil Aviation Special Forces (CESAC)
- Specialized Corps of Metro and Cable Car Railway Security (CESMET)
- Specialized Corps of Tourist Security (CESTUR)
- Specialized Corps of Fuel Control and Merchandise Trade (CECCOM)
- Task Force Ciudad Tranquila (FT-CIUTRAN)
- Specialized Port Security Corps (CESEP)
- Presidential Security Corps (CUSEP)
- Specialized Border Security Corps (CESFRONT)
- National Special Corps of Environmental and Parks Protection (SENPA)
- Military and Police Commission of the Ministry of Public Works and Communications (COMIPOL-MOPC)

== Military training and formation ==
The Higher Institute for Defense "General General Juan Pablo Duarte y Diez" (INSUDE) is the agency dependent on the Ministry of Defense of the Dominican Republic and rector of the graduate schools, academies, technical schools, specialized schools for military training and training that constitute the Education System of the Armed Forces, as stipulated in article 205 of Law 139-13 of the Armed Forces. INSUDE was created as the Specialized Institute for Higher Studies of the Armed Forces (IEESFA) by Decree 1110-03 of December 2, 2003 and designated with its current name by decree 38-09 of January 17, 2009.

Military training for officers of the Armed Forces is carried out by institutions specialized in each component. The Batalla de las Carreras Military Academy aims to train future officers of the National Army. The academy grants a bachelor's degree in Military Sciences lasting 4 years and 3 months.

The Naval Academy, whose purpose is to train officers of the Navy, grants a bachelor's degree in Naval Sciences with a duration of 4 years.

The Aerial, whose function is to train Air Force officers, offers a bachelor's degree in Aeronautical Sciences in three independent modalities: Aviator Mention, Infantry Mention and Aeronautical Maintenance Mention, all three with a duration of 4 years.

Military academies
Army Academy

Naval Academy

Aerial Academy

=== Table of ranks ===
Level	Rank	Army	Navy	Air Force
General Officers or Admirals	Lieutenant General or Admiral			
General Officers or Admirals	Major General or Vice Admiral			
General Officers or Admirals	Brigadier General or Rear Admiral			
Senior Officers	Colonel or Captain			
Senior Officers	Lieutenant colonel or Commander			
Senior Officers	Major or Lieutenant Commander			
Junior Officers	Captain or Ship Lieutenant			
Junior Officers	First Lieutenant or Frigate Lieutenant			
Junior Officers	Second Lieutenant or Corvette Lieutenant			
Non-Commissioned Officers	NCO		—	—
Cadet Officers	Cadet or Midshipman			
NCO's and Troop	Sergeant Major			
NCO's and Troop	First sergeant	—	—	
NCO's and Troop	Sergeant of Administration and Accounting		—	
NCO's and Troop	Sergeant	miniaturadeimagen		
NCO's and Troop	Private First Class			
NCO's and Troop	Private or Sailor			

== See also ==
- List of wars involving the Dominican Republic
- History of the Dominican Republic
- Dominican National Police
