= 2003 protests in Dominican Republic =

The 2003 protests in the Dominican Republic consisted of mass protests, rioting, labor unrest, strikes, demonstrations, rallies, marches, and a protest movement in Dominican Republic between July-November 2003, calling for economic reform despite the economic crisis and financial turmoil, one of the main causes of the political uprising. The movement and uprising were calling for the government of Hipólito Mejía to resign amid popular pressure and anti-presidential opposition on the streets.

Gunfire and shootings, clashes with armed groups, and associates with security forces left at least 5 dead in the first wave and 8 dead in the second wave of violent mass demonstrations.

In response to the growing street protests and rising civil disobedience, the government sent reinforcements and deployed troops to quell the mass protests. Protesters threw stones and hurled bricks at the forces, who responded with extreme force. The protesters marched almost daily in the first wave of protests in July-August when 3 were killed and their demands weren’t met.

The protester's main demands were:

- To change the agreement signed by the Government and the International Monetary Fund (IMF)
- To reduce food prices, electricity costs, telephone rates, and fuel prices
- To achieve better wages for all workers--public and private
- To modify the Hydrocarbons Act
- To suspend the payment of foreign debt
- To allocate five percent of the national budget to el Universidad Autónoma de Santo Domingo
- To stop the Free Trade Agreement with the United States
- To have President Hipolito Mejia resign.

The second and deadlier wave of violent demonstrations and opposition-led street protests was in November when strikers were shot at by the security forces by Rubber bullets as anti-government rallies and violent marches calling for reforms and a solution to end the crisis. Protests turned into riots, calling for the resignation of the government. Thousands participated in the daily protests, leading to fatal clashes.

== See also ==
- 2020 Dominican Republic protests
