= Military ranks of the Dominican Republic =

The Military ranks of Dominican Republic are the military insignia used by the Armed Forces of the Dominican Republic.

== Commissioned officer ranks ==
The rank insignia of commissioned officers.

Rank group	General / flag officers			Senior officers			Junior officers
Dominican Army
Dominican Army	Teniente general	Mayor general	General de brigada	Coronel	Teniente coronel	Mayor	Capitán	Primer teniente	Segundo teniente
Dominican Navy
Dominican Navy	Almirante	Vicealmirante	Contralmirante	Capitán de navío	Capitán de fragata	Capitán de corbeta	Teniente de navio	Teniente de fragata	Teniente de corbeta
Dominican Air Force
Dominican Air Force	Teniente general	Mayor general	General de brigada	Coronel	Teniente coronel	Mayor	Capitán	Primer teniente	Segundo teniente
Rank group	General / flag officers			Senior officers			Junior officers

=== Student officer ranks ===
Rank group	4th year	3rd year	2nd year	1st year
Dominican Army
Dominican Army	Cadete 4.º año	Cadete 3.er año	Cadete 2.º año	Cadete 1.er año
Dominican Navy
Dominican Navy	Guardiamarina 4.º año	Guardiamarina 3.er año	Guardiamarina 2.º año	Guardiamarina 1.er año
Dominican Air Force
Dominican Air Force	Cadete 4.º año	Cadete 3.er año	Cadete 2.º año	Cadete 1.er año

== Other ranks ==
The rank insignia of non-commissioned officers and enlisted personnel.

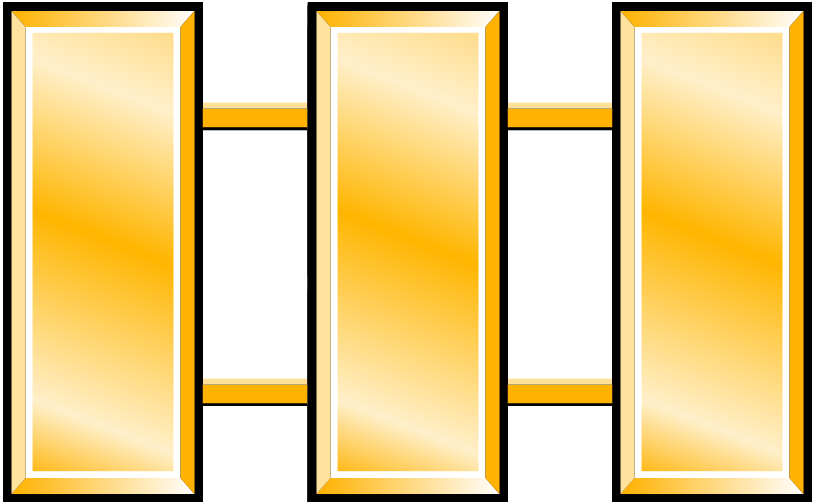
Rank group	Senior NCOs							Junior NCOs	Enlisted
Dominican Army									No insignia
Dominican Army	Sub-teniente tercero	Sub-teniente segundo	Sub-teniente primero	Sargento mayor	Sargento de administracion	Sargento		Cabo	Raso
Dominican Navy
Dominican Navy				Sargentos mayores		Sargentos		Cabos	Marineros especialista
Dominican Air Force
Dominican Air Force				Sargento mayor	Sargento primero	Sargento A/C	Sargento	Cabo	Rasa de primera clase
Rank group	Senior NCOs							Junior NCOs	Enlisted

== Former ranks ==
Rank group	General / flag officers			Senior officers			Junior officers
Dominican Army
Dominican Army	Teniente general	Mayor general	General de brigada	Coronel	Teniente coronel	Mayor	Capitán	Primer teniente	Segundo teniente
