= Politics of the Dominican Republic =

The Dominican Republic is a representative democracy where the president of the Dominican Republic functions as both the head of the government and head of the multi-party system. Executive power is exercised by the government. Legislative power is vested in the bicameral National Congress. The Judiciary is independent of the executive and the legislature.

== Political culture ==
=== Sovereignty ===
With the proclamation of the first constitution in the Dominican Republic on 6 November 1844 in the city of San Cristobal, the Dominican theory of sovereignty, 'independence politics', was formed. The Dominican Republic would remain for the most part republican and representative.

The constitution of San Cristobal established the legislature as superior to the other branches, the judiciary as an independent and the Executive to run the state day-to-day under the oversight of the judiciary and the legislature.

The Congress of the Dominican Republic consists of the Chamber of Deputies and the Senate.

The president of the republic was presented as an impartial public figure that would provide a source of unity to the republic.

== Executive branch ==
The Executive Branch is charged with the daily administration of the state, subject to the oversight of the judicial and legislative branches. The president functions as the head of state, the head of government, and the Commander-in-Chief of the Dominican Armed Forces.

The Dominican Cabinet is responsible for assisting the president in his duty to govern the nation and the president appoints ministers as he sees appropriate.

The president and vice president are elected on the same ticket by popular vote for a four-year term without immediate re-election. After at least one constitutional term, a person who has held the post of president before may run for this office again, according to the last amendment made to the Constitution in 2010. Elections are held in years evenly divisible by four.

The Dominican Constitution takes twenty-seven paragraphs to spell out the president's extensive powers. Among the most important are those that grant him authority over virtually all appointments and removals of public officials, and even popular elected ones; empower him to promulgate the laws passed by Congress; direct him to engage in diplomatic relations; and empower him to command, to deploy, and to make appointments in, the armed forces. The president also has vast emergency powers to suspend basic rights in times of emergency, to defer the legislature, to declare a state of siege, and to rule by decree.

The 1966 Constitution provides for ministers and subcabinet ministers to assist in public administration. These officials must be Dominican citizens, at least twenty-five years of age, with full civil and political rights. The powers of the ministers are determined by law. However, the president is constitutionally responsible for the actions of his ministers. Ministers serve at the president's discretion, and function both as administrators of their ministries and as agents of presidential authority.

=== Military ===
The military consists of about 45,000 active duty personnel. Its principal mission is to defend the nation, but it serves more as an internal security force. The army, twice as large as the other services combined, consists of four infantry brigades and a combat support brigade; the air force operates three flying squadrons; and the navy maintains 30 aging vessels. The Dominican Republic's military is second in size to Cuba's in the Caribbean.

The armed forces participate fully in counter-narcotics efforts. They also are active in efforts to control contraband and illegal immigration from Haiti to the Dominican Republic and from the Dominican Republic to the United States and Puerto Rico.

=== Attorney general ===
See Attorney General of the Republic (Dominican Republic)

The attorney general is appointed by the president. In order to become an attorney general, the individual must be meet the following requirements:

1. They must be Dominican by birth or origin and must be older than 35.
2. Must be able to exercise full political rights
3. Much have a bachelor's degree or higher in law
4. Must be a practices lawyer or a university professor of law for at least 12 years, or have spent the same amount of time as a representative of the Public Ministry or as a judge within the Judicial Power.

== Legislative branch ==
Legislative power is exercised by a bicameral National Congress (Congreso de la República). The upper house is the Senate (Senado) with 32 members, elected for a four-year term in single-seat constituencies. The lower house is the Chamber of Deputies (Cámara de Diputados) with 178 members, elected for a four-year term by proportional representation in accordance to each province, as follows: one deputy is elected for every 50,000 inhabitants plus fraction exceeding 25,000, but never less than two.

Among the attributions of the Senate are the following:

- Studying and approving laws.
- To appoint the president and other members of the Central Electoral Board and their deputies.
- To appoint the members of the Public Accounts Chamber.
- To approve or not the appointment of diplomatic agents made by the Executive.
- To decide on the claims of the Chamber of Deputies against public officers for misconduct or serious faults in the performance of their duties.
- In the event of public accusation, the Senate may only impose the sanction of removal from office. However, the removed officer may be subject to being tried according to the respective statutes, if applicable. For the removal of office, a vote of at least ¾ of all members of the Senate is required.

Congressional and municipal elections are held separately from the presidential elections. Re-election is always possible, without any limitation. The office of senator and deputy are incompatible with any other position or employment at the Public Administration.

== Judicial branch ==
The Judicial Power is charged of administering justice in order to ensure the respect, protection and supervision of rights recognized under the Constitution and laws. Its higher organ is the Supreme Court of Justice, which is composed of 16 judges appointed by the National Council of the Magistracy, an entity created by the constitutional reform of 1994 to ensure the independence of the Judicial Branch.

The National Council of Magistrates is nominated by the three major political parties. It is presided over by the president of the republic, and has the following members:

- The president of the Senate, and a senator chosen by the Senate from a different party than the president of the Senate.
- The president of the Chamber of Deputies, and a deputy chosen by the Chamber of Deputies from a different party than the president of the Chamber of Deputies.
- The current president of the Supreme Court of Justice.
- A judge of the Supreme Court of Justice chosen by this court, which serves as secretary.

The Supreme Court hears appeals from lower courts (as a court of cassation) and chooses members of lower courts. It has sole jurisdiction over actions against the president, designated members of his cabinet, and members of Congress. It has administrative and financial autonomy.

Apart from working as an appeals court for all judgments rendered by judicial courts, the Supreme Court supervises all judges in the Dominican territory. Its judicial and administrative functions may be summarized as follows:

- To decide on appeals as statutorily established.
- To decide as last instance on the matters that are under the jurisdiction of Appeals Courts as court of first instance.
- To decide as only instance on the criminal cases against the President and Vice-president of the Republic, Senators, Deputies, Ministers, Vice-ministers, Supreme Court Judges, Public General Attorney, Judges and General Attorneys of Appeals Courts, State attorneys of the Land Courts and Judges of Administrative Courts.
- To decide as only instance on the constitutionality of laws, at the request of the Executive Power, one of the Presidents of the legislative chambers or an interested party.
- To appoint the judges of the Appeals court, the Land courts, the Courts of First Instance, the Judges of Instruction, the Peace Courts and their deputies, the Administrative-Tax Court and the judges of any other judicial courts created by law, according to the provisions of the Law on Judicial Career.
- To exercise the highest disciplinary authority on all members of the Judicial Power, being able to impose sanctions such as suspension, removal or prison.
- To transfer provisionally or definitively from one jurisdiction to another, as it may deem necessary, the judges of the Appeals Court, the judges of First Instance of the Land Courts, the Judges of Instruction, the Peace Judges and other court judges created by law.
- To create the administrative positions that may be necessary to comply with the attributions granted by the Constitution and laws.
- To appoint all officers and employees of the Judicial Power.
- To determine the wages and other payments of Judges and administrative personnel belonging to the Judicial Power.

== Municipal government and administrative divisions ==
Each of the 31 provinces is headed by a presidentially appointed governor. People-elected mayors and municipal councils administer the National District (Santo Domingo) and the 103 municipal districts.

The Dominican Republic has 31 provinces (provincias) and one National District* (Distrito Nacional): Azua, Baoruco, Barahona, Dajabón, Duarte, El Seibo, Elías Piña, Espaillat, Hato Mayor, Independencia, La Altagracia, La Romana, La Vega, María Trinidad Sánchez, Monseñor Nouel, Monte Cristi, Monte Plata, Pedernales, Peravia, Puerto Plata, Hermanas Mirabal, Samaná, Sánchez Ramírez, San Cristóbal, San José de Ocoa, San Juan, San Pedro de Macorís, Santiago, Santiago Rodríguez, Santo Domingo, Distrito Nacional, and Valverde.

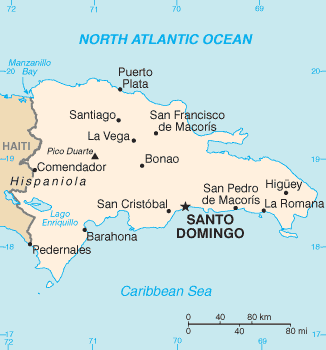
Map of Dominican Republic

Provinces of the Dominican Republic

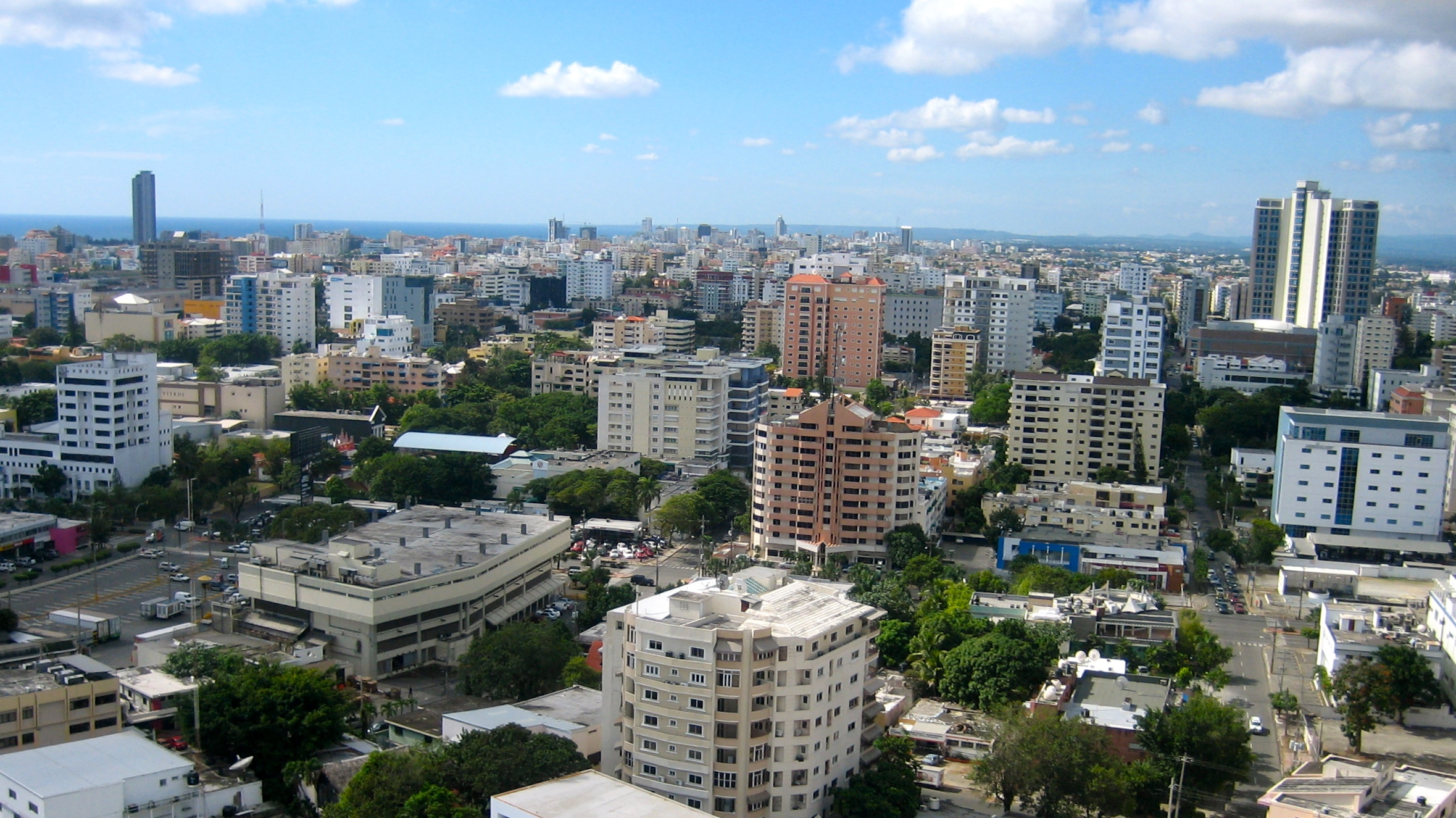
View of Santo Domingo, the capital of the Dominican Republic

Each province is divided into municipalities, of which there are 117 in the country, each of which is divided into smaller territorial units, such as municipal districts, rural areas and villages. There are currently 70 municipal districts in the Dominican Republic. The municipalities and municipal districts consist of an urban area and several rural areas, of which there are 715 in the country. The rural district consists of several places, as today a total of 8,783 in the country. Parajes are the smallest territorial units in the political-administrative department of the Dominican Republic.

== Political history since 1996 ==
The Dominican Republic has a multi-party political system with national elections every four years. In two rounds of presidential elections in 1996, nearly 80% of eligible Dominican voters went to the polls. The leading parties in 1994 were the PRSC, linked to the International Christian Democratic political movement, whose candidate was President Joaquín Balaguer; the PRD, affiliated with the Socialist International, whose candidate was José Francisco Peña Gómez; and the PLD, whose candidate was former President Juan Bosch.

In the 1994 elections, international observers noted many irregularities in the voter lists, and the opposition PRD immediately charged the Central Electoral Board and the PRSC with fraud. A Verification Commission appointed by the Central Electoral Board, however, did not accept the PRD's charges. By all estimates, total disenfranchised voters far exceeded the 22,281-vote margin of victory in favor of President Balaguer on 2 August 1994.

Following an intense period of political activity, the competing political parties signed a Pact for Democracy on 10 August, reducing President Balaguer's term of office from 4 to 2 years, setting early elections, and reforming the constitution. A new Central Electoral Board was named to work on electoral reform. The main candidates in 1996 were Vice President Jacinto Peynado (PRSC), José Francisco Peña Gómez (PRD), and Leonel Fernández (PLD).

Domestic and international observers saw the 1996 election as transparent and fair. After the first round in which Jacinto Peynado (PRSC) was eliminated, the PRSC with Joaquín Balaguer endorsed Leonel Fernández (PLD). Results in the second round, 45 days later on 30 June, were tabulated quickly, and although the victory margin was narrow (1.5%), it was never questioned. The transition from incumbent administration to incoming administration was smooth and ushered in a new, modern era in Dominican political life.

Fernández' political agenda was one of economic and judicial reform. He helped enhance Dominican participation in hemispheric affairs, such as the Organization of American States and the follow-up to the Miami Summit. On 16 May 2000, Hipólito Mejía, the Revolutionary Democratic Party candidate, was elected president in another free and fair election. He defeated Dominican Liberation Party candidate Danilo Medina 49.8% to 24.84%. Former President Balaguer garnered 24.68% of the vote. Mejia entered office on 16 August with four priorities: education reform, economic development, increased agricultural production, and poverty alleviation. Mejía also champions the cause of Central American and Caribbean economic integration and migration, particularly as it relates to Haiti. On 16 May 2004, Leonel Fernández, running for the Dominican Liberation Party, garnered about 57% of the vote. On 16 May 2008, Leonel Fernández, running for the Dominican Liberation Party, garnered about 54% of the vote for a second consecutive term in office.

In 2012, Danilo Medina narrowly won election as president against Hipólito Mejía. An accord with former president Fernandez, ratified by the broad PLD leadership, called for a change in the constitution to allow a second consecutive term as president, but with Leonel Fernandez installed as the head of the PLD pending his turn as candidate for the presidency in 2020. The constitution was changed, and Medina won reelection by a wide margin against Luis Abinader of the Modern Revolutionary Party (PRM).

MejíaIn the runup to the 2020 presidential elections, supporters of President Medina pushed for an additional change to the country's constitution to permit a third term. While Medina himself publicly remained uncommitted to another term, a fierce struggle within the PLD ensued. Following demonstrations outside the congress led by Leonel Fernandez himself, and subsequently pressure from the United States (notably through a public readout of a call from Secretary of State Mike Pompeo), president Medina announced on July 22, 2019, that he would not run again, calling instead for "new blood" (i.e., not supporting ex-president Fernandez). Medina supports former Minister of Public Works Gonzalo Castillo against Fernandez in primaries for the PLD nomination scheduled for October 6. Within the PRM, Abinader is being challenged for the nomination by ex-president Mejía.

== Elections and political parties ==
=== Political parties ===
==== Dominican Revolutionary Party (Partido Revolucionario Dominicano, PRD) ====
The Dominican Revolutionary Party was founded mainly by Juan Bosch, Juan Isidro Jimenes Grullón, and Rafael Mainardi Reyna, among other Trujillo-era exiles on January 21, 1939, in Havana, Cuba. After Trujillo's death, Juan Bosch, running on behalf of the PRD in 1963, became the first democratically elected official in the country's history. The party has won the presidency four times since its founding, having won in 1963, 1978, 1982, and in the 2000 elections. The PRD currently holds one seat in the senate, 57 of 155 mayors, and 16 of the 190 seats in the chamber of deputies. The PRD's main ideology is centre, with certain factions of the party being centre-left and centre-right, although the party has been considered more conservative than the PRD in recent years. The current party leader, who is also the current minister of the department of the interior, is Miguel Vargas Maldonado. The general secretary of the party is Tony Peña Guaba. The Dominican Revolutionary party colors are light blue and white.

==== Dominican Liberation Party (Partido de la Liberación Dominicana, PLD) ====
The PLD was founded by former president Juan Bosch in December 15, 1973. The following year, the party participated in the national elections for the first time. The party had its first national victory in 1996, with Leonel Fernandez becoming the party's first elected president and the 50th president of Dominican Republic overall. The party has been elected into office four times since its founding, having won the presidential elections in 1996, 2004, 2008, and in the 2012 elections. Currently, the PLD has 26 of 32 seats in the senate, 106 out of 155 mayors, and 106 out of 190 in the chamber of deputies. According to the Party's official website, the PLD considers itself to be primarily centre-left, rejecting populism and neoliberalism. The current party leader is former President Danilo Medina Sanchez. The Dominican Liberation Party has yellow and purple as its representative colours.

==== Modern Revolutionary Party ====
The Dominican Revolutionary Party (Spanish: Partido Revolucionario Moderno, PRM) is a political party in the Dominican Republic. Traditionally a left-of-centre party and social democratic in nature, the party has shifted since the 2000s toward the political centre. The party's distinctive color is white. Traditionally, the party has two presidents: the "titular president" and the "acting president" (and actually, a sort of vice-president); until 2010 the presidents and the secretary-general were proscribed to run for any elected office. The party came to power in the 2020 Dominican Republic general election.

=== Elections ===
Presidential elections are held in the Dominican Republic every four years, on the 16 May. The candidate must gain a majority vote of at least 50% plus one to win the presidency in the first round. If none of the candidates obtains such a majority, a second poll will take place 45 days later, at which the population will decide between the two candidates that had the best results during the first poll.

== Political history ==
After many years of dictatorship or corrupt democracy, the regime is believed to have shown some legitimacy after the election in 1996, in which the longtime leader Balaguer lost power to Leonel Fernández. The form of government is a representative democracy with two chambers and president one as head of state, government one and army one. According to the Constitution, the president has great power. Among other things, he can override the laws that Congress brings, and he has the power to repeal all laws and introduce his own by state of emergency.

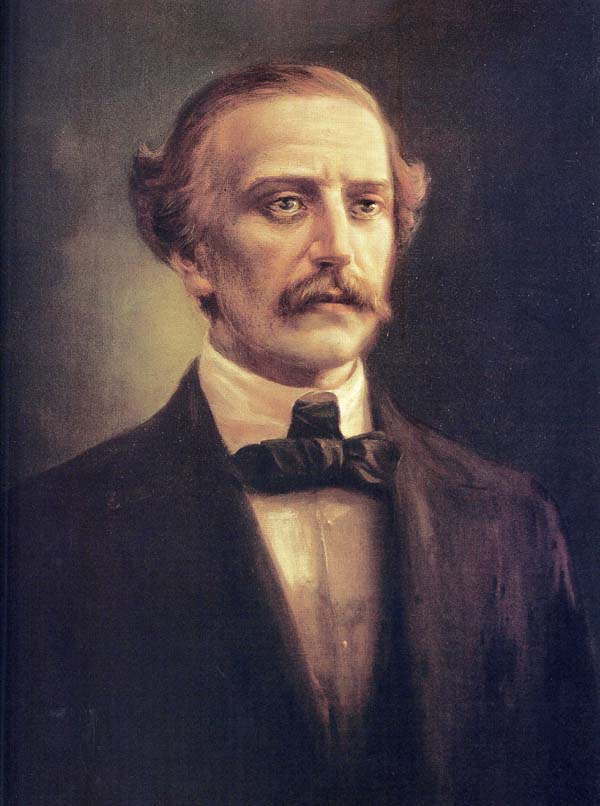
Juan Pablo Duarte, founder of the Dominican Republic. Dominican War of Independence (1844–56)

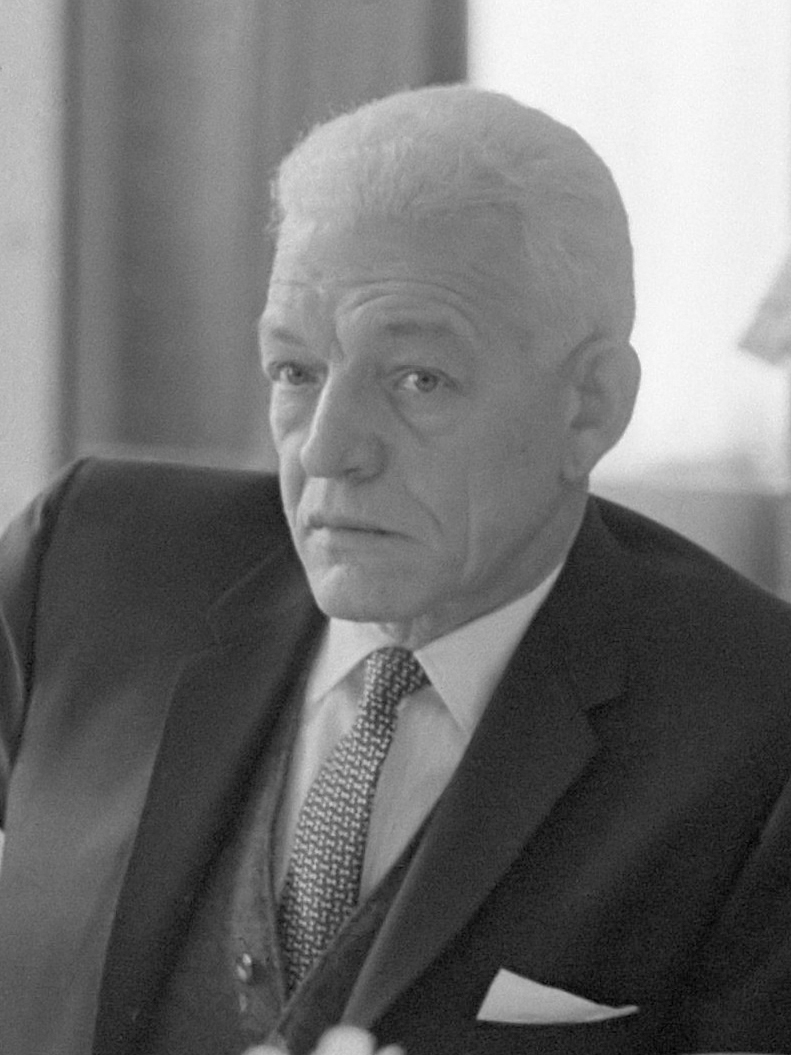
President Juan Bosch, Post-Trujillo (1961–1996). The first democratically elected president after Rafael Trujillo's regime

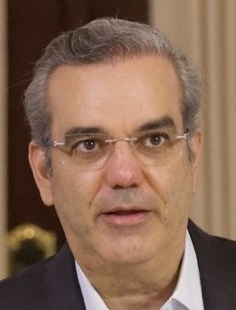
Luis Abinader, the current President of the Dominican Republic since 2020

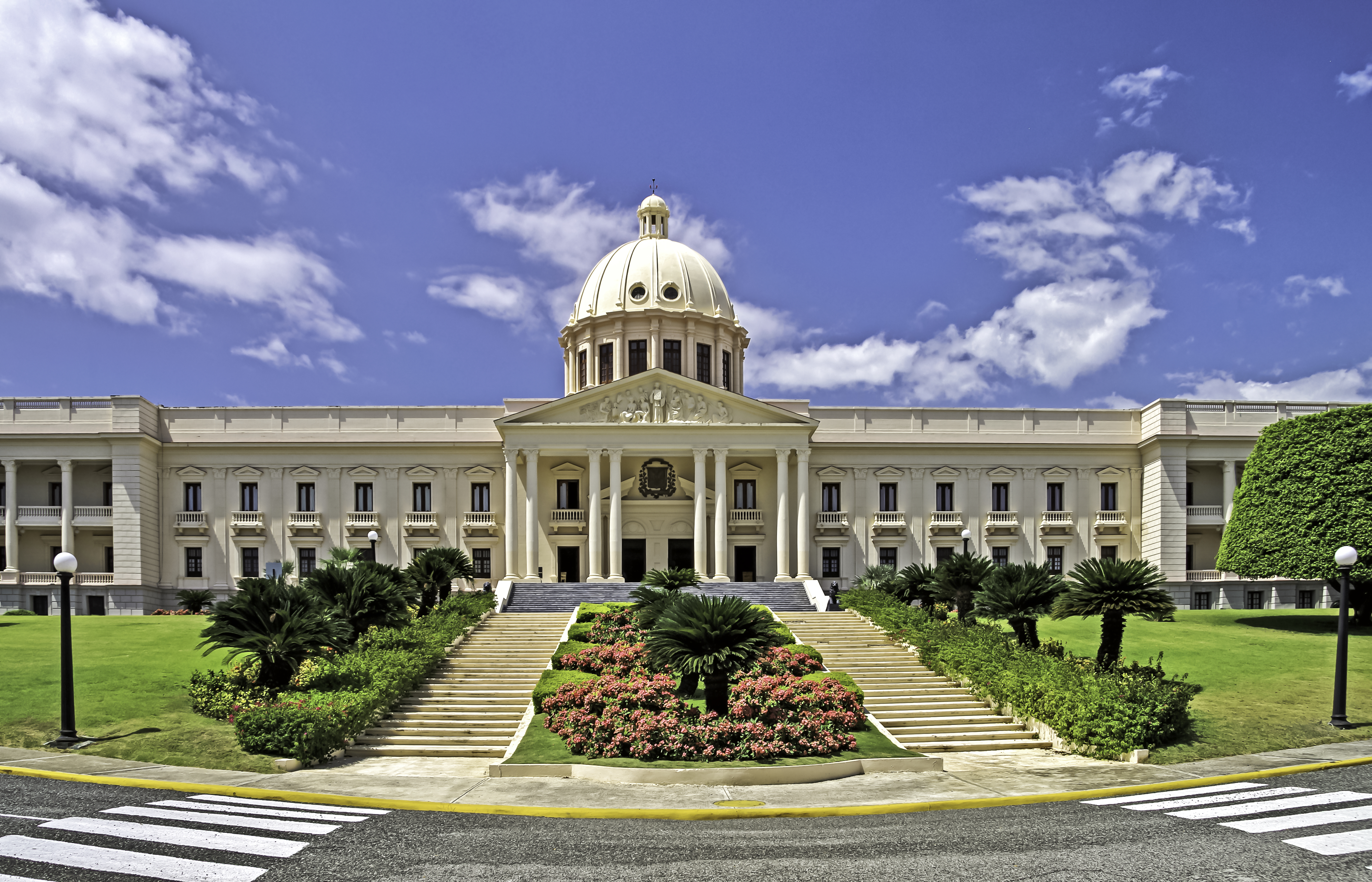
National Palace in Santo Domingo

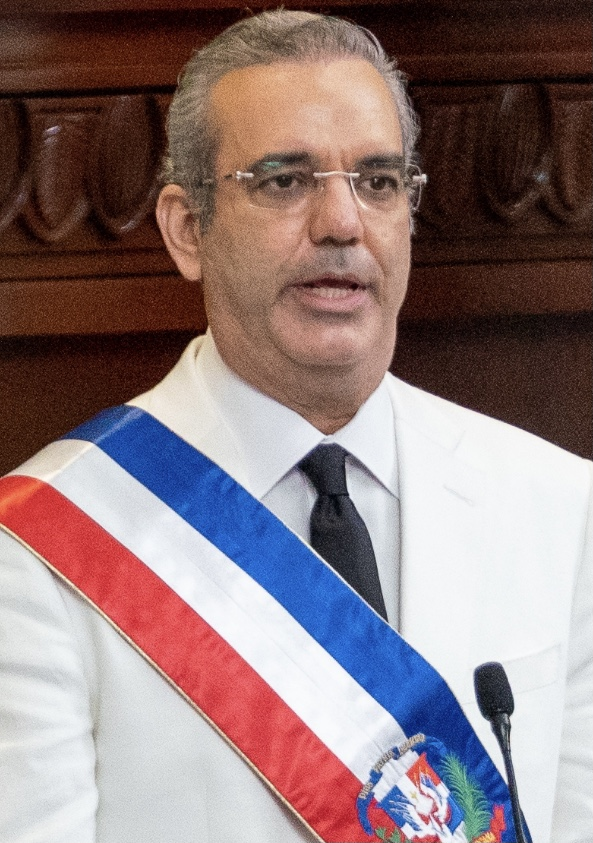
President Luis Abinader

Leonel Fernández and the government are at the center of the political scene. There are three main political parties. Partido Revolucionado Dominicano (PRD), which is socialist, Partido de la Liberación Dominicana (PLD), which is conservative / liberal and Partido Reformista Social Cristiano (PRSC), which is Balaguer's old right - wing party. Leonel Fernández, and his bloc with the mother party PLD have a majority in all chambers. The big task is to restore the conditions as before the recession of 2003-2004, and they are working closely with the World Bank. Tight fiscal policy is pursued and privatizations are implemented.

Relations with the US have improved since Leonel Fernández's accession. Here, the events in Haiti are an important factor. Balaguer, the former president, made himself unpopular in the United States by criticizing U.S. intervention in Haiti. The United States had arranged for Aristide to be deployed, but Balaguer was not happy about that. Leonel Fernández, however, was ready to bury the hatchet and became the first Dominican president to visit Haiti in 70 years. Today, trade with the United States accounts for 87% of the country's trade, so it requires a good relationship between the parties. Leonel Fernández's government has placed the country under great power.

The Dominican Republic has a close relationship with the United States, and has close cultural ties with the Commonwealth of Puerto Rico and other states and jurisdictions in the United States.

The Dominican Republic's relations with neighboring Haiti are strained over mass migration from Haiti to the Dominican Republic, where citizens of the Dominican Republic blame the Haitians for increased crime and other social problems. The Dominican Republic is a regular member of the Organization Internationale de la Francophonie.

The Dominican Republic has a free trade agreement with the United States, Costa Rica, El Salvador, Guatemala, Honduras and Nicaragua through the Dominican Republic-Central America free trade agreement. And an Economic Partnership Agreement with the European Union and the Caribbean Community through the Caribbean Forum.

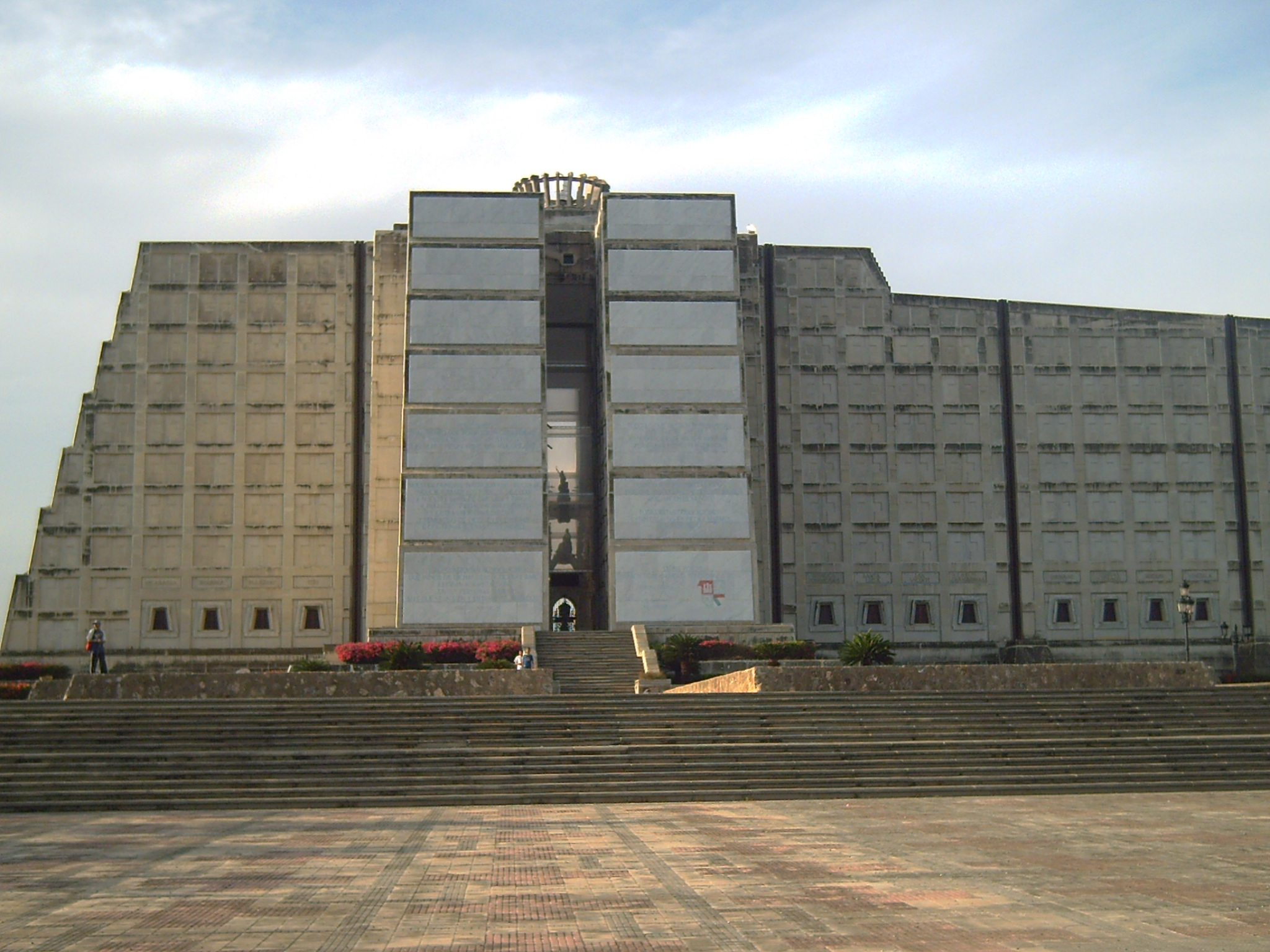
Columbus Lighthouse

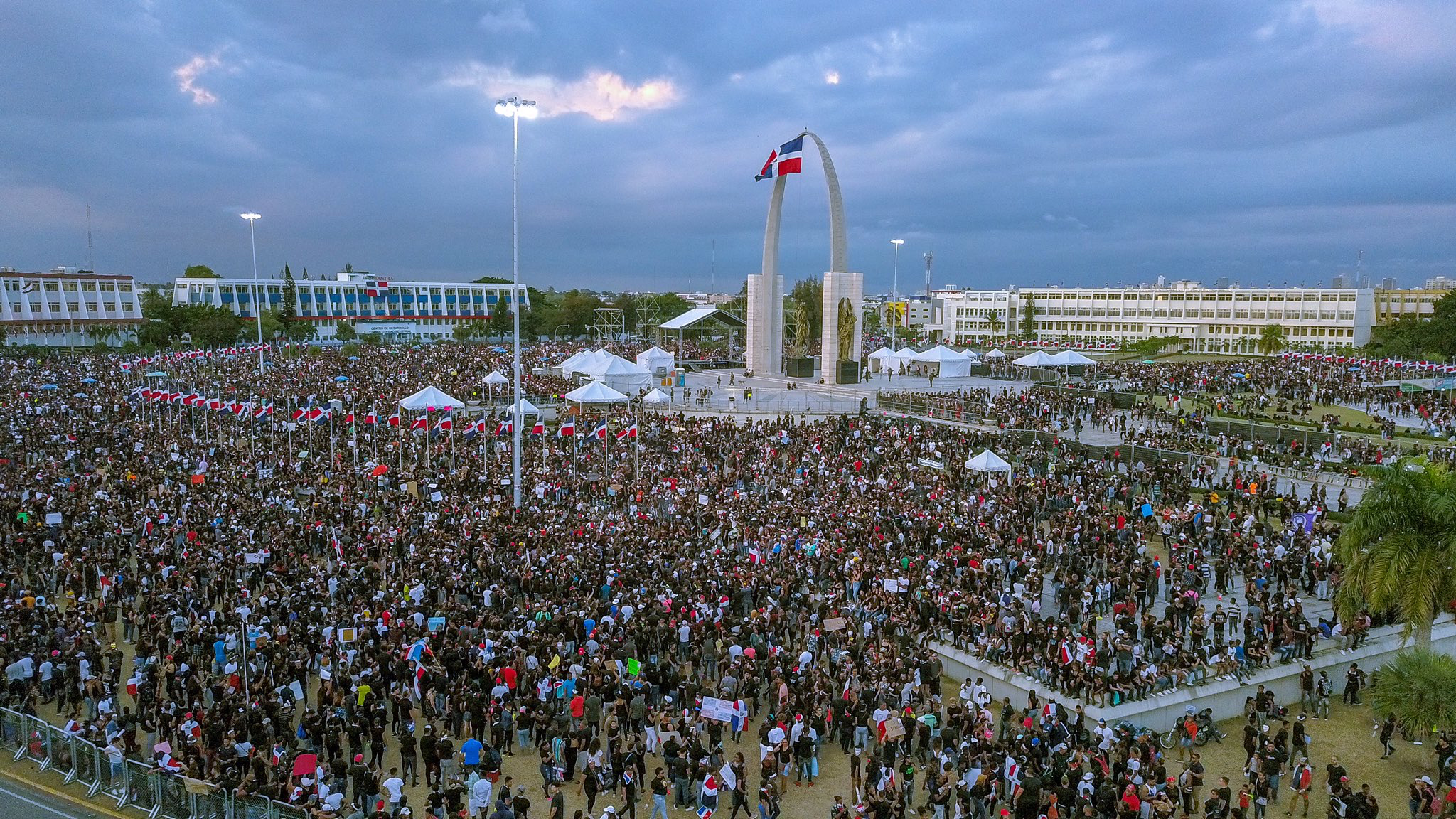
Municipal Elections Protests in the Dominican Republic in 2020 at Plaza de La Bandera, Santo Domingo
