= Agripino Núñez Collado =

Dominican Republic clergyman (1933–2022)

Monsignor Agripino Núñez Collado (9 November 1933 – 22 January 2022) was a Roman Catholic priest and scholar from the Dominican Republic.

== Biography ==
Núñez Collado was born in La Galeta, Sabana Iglesia, and was ordained a priest on 19 March 1959 in Zamora, Spain. He began his academic work at the Pontifical Catholic University Mother and Teacher as teacher after its foundation on 9 September 1962; the next year he was promoted to vice-rector. He served as rector of the university from 1970 to 2014.

Núñez Collado died on 22 January 2022, at the age of 88 from COVID-19.
