= Flag Square of Santo Domingo =

Monument in Dominican Republic

Coordinates: 18.4500°N 69.9750°W

Flag of Square
- Plaza de la Bandera
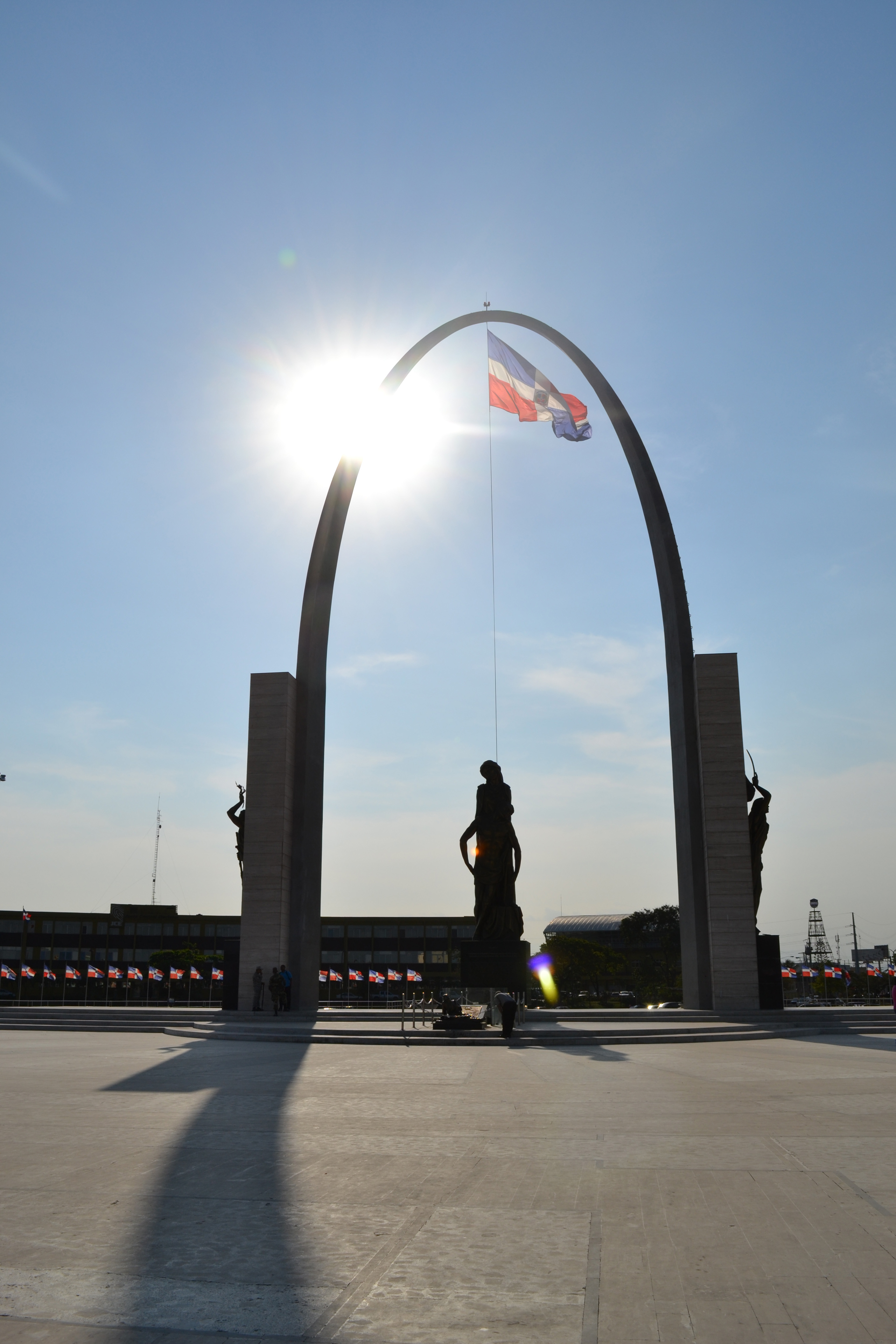
- Interactive map of the Flag of Square area

General information
- Type: Triumphal arch
- Location: Santo Domingo; Dominican Republic
- Inaugurated: 1978
- Renovated: 14 February 1997

The Flag Square, Plaza de la Bandera in Spanish, is the biggest monument dedicated to the Flag of Dominican Republic, is located in one of the busiest areas of the city of Santo Domingo (Dominican Republic), at the intersection of the Avenues February 27 and Gregorio Luperon. It is a patriotic monument seeks to pay tribute to one of the most important national symbols of the nation.

This is made up of representative elements linked to the ideas of Dominican liberators and at the same symbolism that contains the shield of the flag.

The Square is used with many purpose like manifestation and the celebration of any national day like the Dominican Republic Independence Day.

== History ==
The current Flag Square was built in 1978 during the government of Dr. Joaquín Balaguer as the center of a complex of public buildings including the headquarters of Ministry of Defense, the Central Electoral Board, the Institute for Price Stabilization (INESPRE), the Dominican Agrarian Institute (IAD) and the Center for Import and Investment, among others.

In February 1997, President Leonel Fernández reopened the monument after having undergone a remodeling, and renamed Flag Square (Plaza de la Bandera), replacing Independence Square, as it was originally called.

The design of the work was the responsibility of the architect Cristian Martinez and the engineer Andres Gomez Dubriel, who conceived the structure as a Latin cross, which can be clearly seen from the air, and in the center stood a replica of the Arc de Triomphe.

On both sides of the arch they were placed two angels representing the glory and honor, and center, a sculpture symbolizing the motherland, holding the fallen soldier, made by sculptor Juan de Ávalo.

In this Plaza, the January 26, 1979, Pope John Paul II celebrated the first Mass of a Roman Pontiff, held in American land, projecting the square worldwide. In this mass, Pope was facing the original painting of the Virgin of Altagracia, which was taken especially from the Basílica Catedral Nuestra Señora de la Altagracia for the occasion.

== Tomb of the Unknown Dominican Soldier and Flags ==
The tomb of the unknown soldier who died for the freedom of the Dominicans is located in the Square.

Numerous masts in the square marking the perimeter and all of them are hoisted flags of the Dominican Republic are located. In addition, the triumphal arch of the center of the square is also used as single mast because it has a halyard with another flag of the Dominican Republic, it hoisted larger than those in the above waving masts.
