= Dominican Republic National Police =

Dominican National Police Policía Nacional Dominicana
- Dominican National Police Emblem and flag

- Common name: Policía Nacional
- Abbreviation: PN
- Motto: Proteger y servir Serve and protect.

Agency overview
- Formed: March 2, 1936
- Employees: 36,968
- Annual budget: RD$6.744 millions (2024)

Jurisdictional structure
- National agency: Dominican Republic
- Operations jurisdiction: Dominican Republic
- Jurisdiction of the agency.
- General nature: Local civilian police

Operational structure
- Headquarters: Palacio de la Policía Nacional
- Elected officer responsible: Faride Raful.
- Agency executive: Ramón Antonio Guzmán Peralta, Major General
- Parent agency: Ministry of Interior and Police

Notables
- Person: Faride Raful, Head of agency, for policing, national security and immigration matters.

Website
- www.policianacional.gob.do (in Spanish)

The Dominican National Police (Spanish: Policía Nacional Dominicana) is the national police force of the Dominican Republic. It is the largest police force in the Dominican Republic under the control of the Ministry of Interior and Police. Ranks and insignia are similar to those of the Dominican Army.

Its main function is to protect the Dominican nation, enforce the law by constitutional mandate to maintain and guarantee the necessary conditions for public freedoms and rights and to ensure peaceful cohabitation among the population.

== History ==
During the U.S. Occupation of Dominican Republic from 1916 to 1924, the United States Military assisted in creating the Dominican Constabulary Guard (DCG), which acted as national police and defense agency and the forerunner for today's Dominican National Police.

The National Congress of Dominican Republic enacted law 14 on November 5, 1930, which allows the leader of the Dominican Republic to appoint and dismiss municipal (local) heads of police. For the next six years Dominican Republic had various municipal (local) police officers as well as Constabulary Guard. The national police force itself (as the agency it is today) is not officially formed until March 2, 1936, with the congressional passing of decree No. 1523. With the formation of a new national police force, Colonel Miguel A. Roman was appointed as the head of the Dominican National Police. [2]

== Training ==
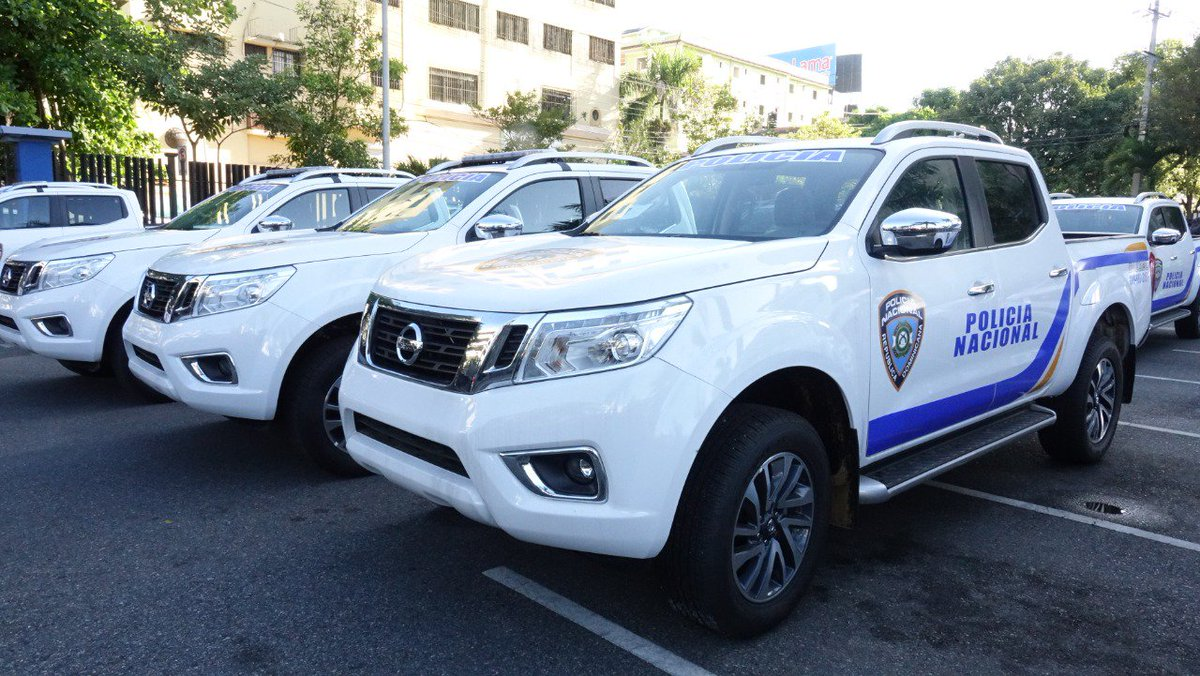
Dominican Republic police pick-up trucks.

On May 17, 1966, a general training school for military and police officers was created in the DR. Two years later on June 20, 1968, the National Police Officer Training School was established in San Cristobal under the surpervision of the school's first director, Eulogio Benito. Later, General Order No. 014-2004 gave the academy the name the "National School of Public Safety" whose motto remains to this day "Education-Discipline-Protection."

In January 1983 a school of Criminal Investigations was created to provide advanced training to police officers who were given the positions of investigators in the National Police Force. The importance of training and education of police officers was recognized early on in the agency and various other "continuing education" and advanced training schools were created in various disciplines for officer in Dominican Republic National Poilice Force that are still in use today.

== Dirección Central de Investigación Criminal (DICRIM) ==
The Organic Law of the National Police, No. 590-16, established the creation of the Dirección Central de Investigación Criminal (DICRIM). This department is primarily responsible for investigating criminal acts committed within the national territory, developing crime prevention strategies, and leading high-impact operations within the criminal sphere.

== Tourism Police (POLITUR) ==
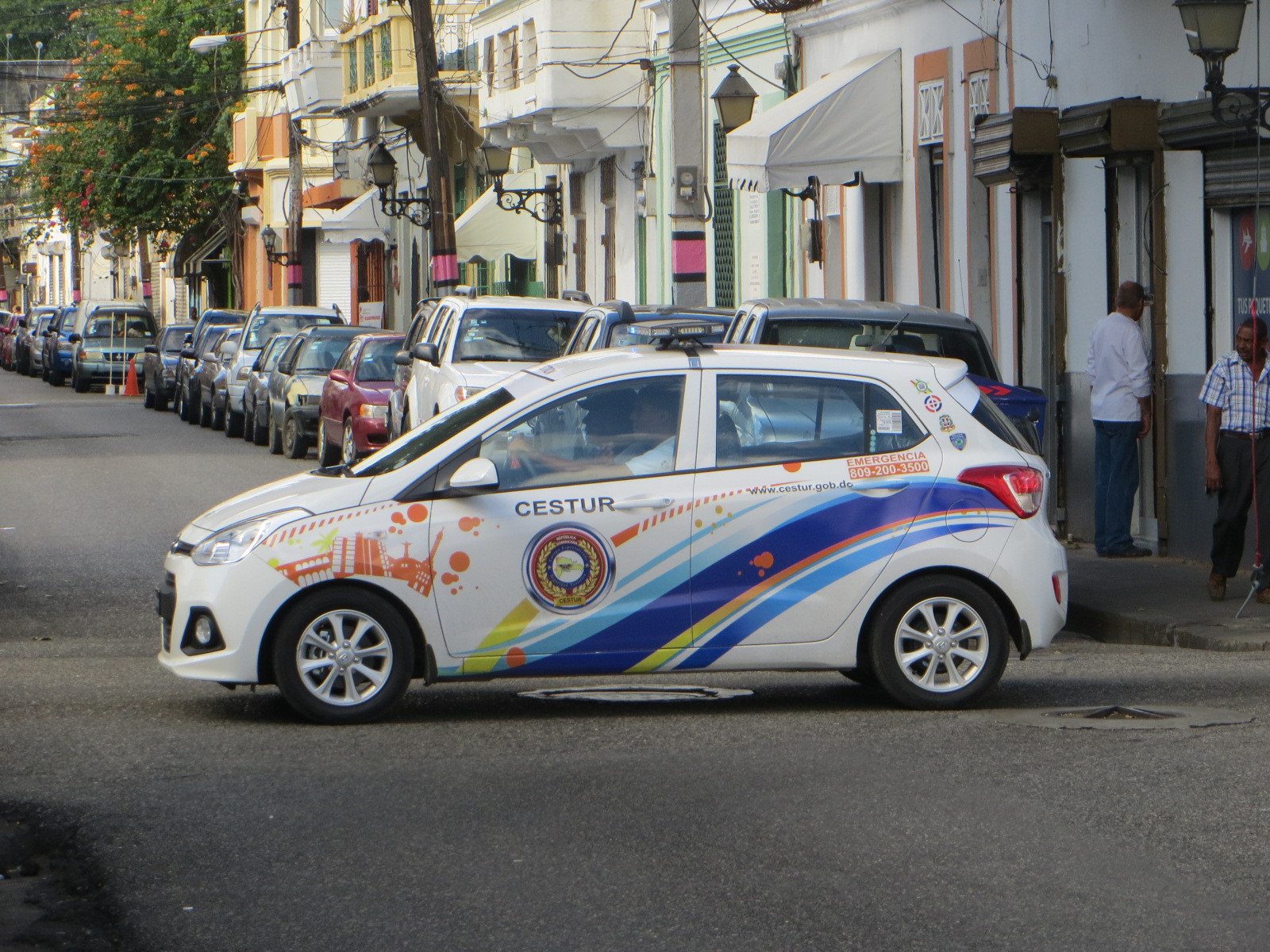
Tourism Security Specialized Corps unit in Santo Domingo.

The National Police force created special unit to police airports and tourism areas in Dominican Republic in 1975, due to the popularity of tourism on the island. It was task with police duties in the tourist areas eventually becoming a separate police force called POLITUR (Policia de Turismo - Tourism Police). POLITUR officers wear white shirts, blue pants, and blue caps to differentiate from the National Police.

In 2013, POLITUR was reorganized as the Cuerpo Especializado de Seguridad Turística (CESTUR). This new organization is a part of the Ministry of Defense, changing it from a civilian police organization to a military one.

== Aircraft inventory ==
The Police operate 3 aircraft.

Aircraft	Origin	Type	Versions	In service	Notes
Bell OH-58 Kiowa	United States	scout helicopter	OH-58A	1	
Eurocopter Ecureuil	France	light utility helicopter	AS-350B	1	
Cessna 172 Skyhawk	United States	utility airplane	Ce172	1	

== Notable staff ==
From 2023 to 2025 the Major General of the National Police was Ramón Antonio Guzmán Peralta.

== See also ==
- Crime in the Dominican Republic
- Law Enforcement in Dominican Republic
