= Government of the Dominican Republic =

Government of the Dominican Republic Gobierno de la República Dominicana (Spanish)
- Coat of arms of the Dominican Republic Logo of the current government of the Dominican Republic
- Polity type: Unitary presidential republic
- Constitution: Constitution of the Dominican Republic

Legislative branch
- Name: Congress of the Dominican Republic
- Type: Bicameral
- Meeting place: Palace of the National Congress
- Upper house
- Name: Senate of the Dominican Republic
- Presiding officer: Ricardo De Los Santos Polanco, President of the Senate
- Appointer: Central Electoral Board via Universal suffrage elections
- Lower house
- Name: Chamber of Deputies of the Dominican Republic
- Presiding officer: Alfredo Pacheco, President of the Chamber of Deputies
- Appointer: Central Electoral Board via Universal suffrage elections

Executive branch
- Head of state and government
- Title: President of the Dominican Republic
- Currently: Luis Abinader
- Appointer: Central Electoral Board via Universal suffrage elections
- Cabinet
- Current cabinet: Cabinet of Luis Abinader
- Leader: President of the Dominican Republic
- Appointer: President of the Dominican Republic
- Headquarters: National Palace
- Ministries: 25

Judicial branch
- Name: Judiciary of the Dominican Republic
- Courts: Supreme Court of the Dominican Republic
- Chief judge: Justiniano Montero Montero

The government of the Dominican Republic (Spanish: Gobierno de la República Dominicana, also known as the Dominican government; Spanish: Gobierno dominicano) is the authority of the Dominican state based on a representative democracy into three branches: the executive, which is exercised by the President and his cabinet; the legislative, which is vested in a bicameral parliamentary body; and an independent judicial system.

== National government ==
=== Executive branch ===
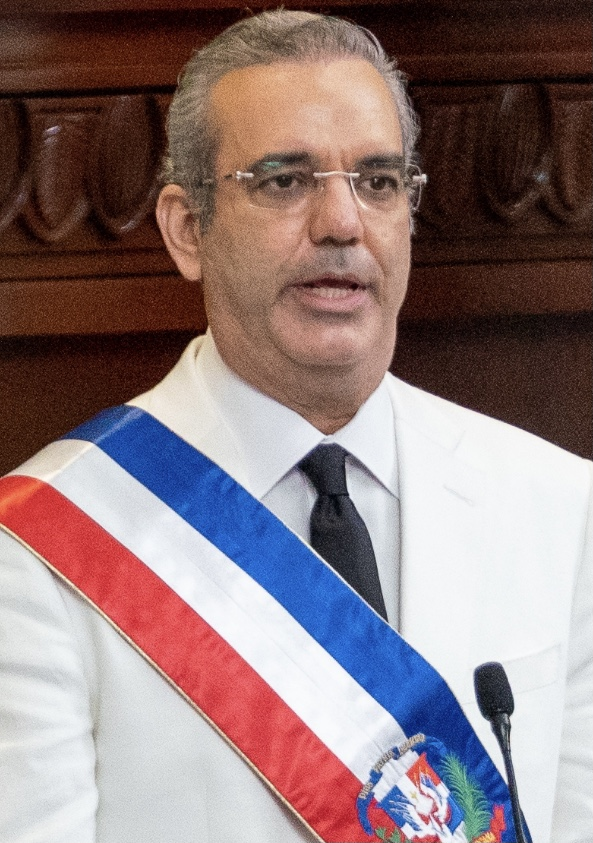
Luis Abinader
54th President

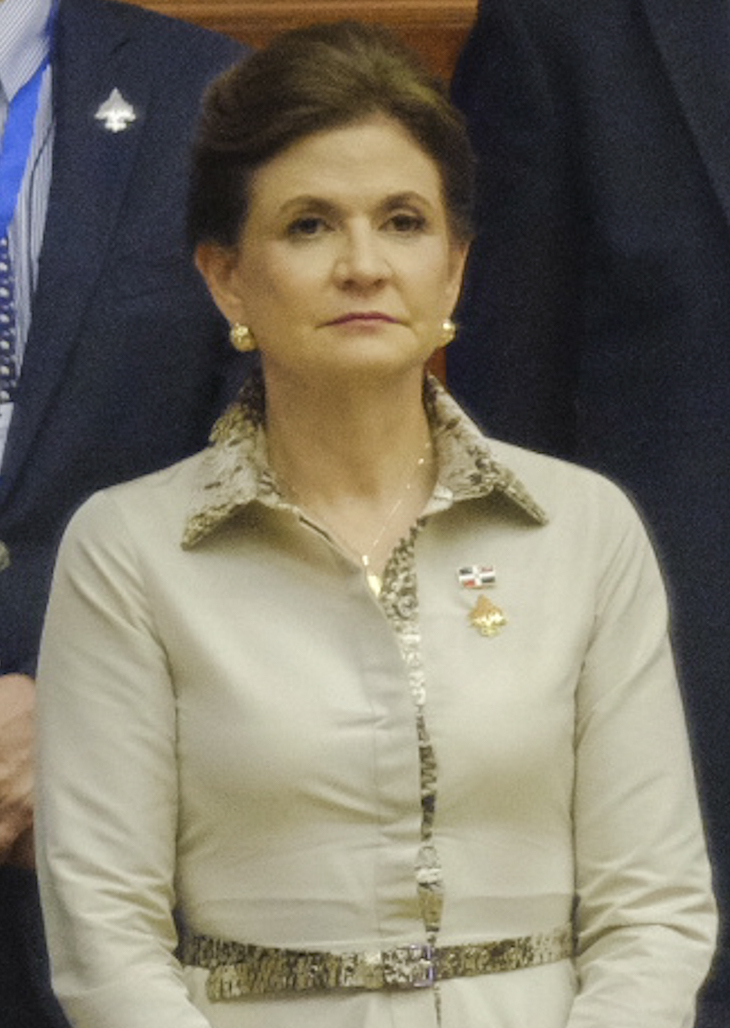
Raquel Peña
40th Vice President

since August 16, 2020

The president and the vice president are elected on the same ticket by popular vote for a four-year term and may serve only two term without immediate re-election. After at least one constitutional term, a person who has held the post of president before may run for this office again, according to the last amendment made to the Dominican Constitution in 2010. The president appoints the Cabinet and the governors of the 31 provinces, and serves as commander-in-chief of the Armed Forces of the Dominican Republic.

The Dominican Constitution takes twenty-seven paragraphs to spell out the president's extensive powers. Among the most important are those that grant him authority over virtually all appointments and removals of public officials, and even popular elected ones; empower him to promulgate the laws passed by Congress; direct him to engage in diplomatic relations; and empower him to command, to deploy, and to make appointments in, the armed forces. The president also has vast emergency powers to suspend basic rights in times of emergency, to defer the legislature, to declare a state of siege, and to rule by decree.

The National Palace is the seat of the executive branch of the Dominican Republic. It houses the offices of the president and the vice president.

National Palace in Santo Domingo

==== Cabinet ====
The Cabinet of the Dominican Republic is nominated and selected by the President of the Dominican Republic and may be removed by the President at any time. Its members head the ministries and other key government offices. The Cabinet is responsible for assisting the president in his duty to govern the nation.

==== Ministries ====
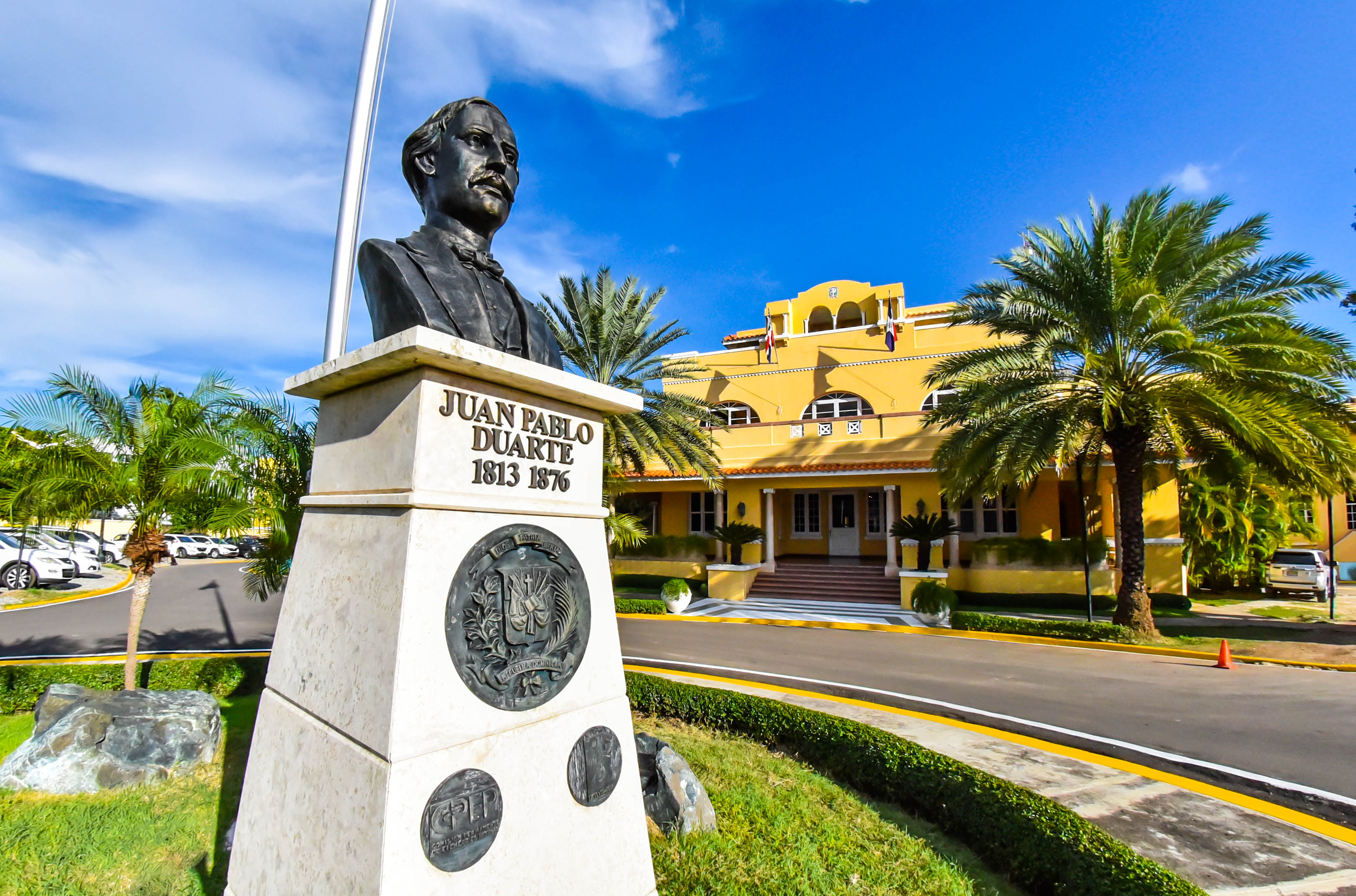
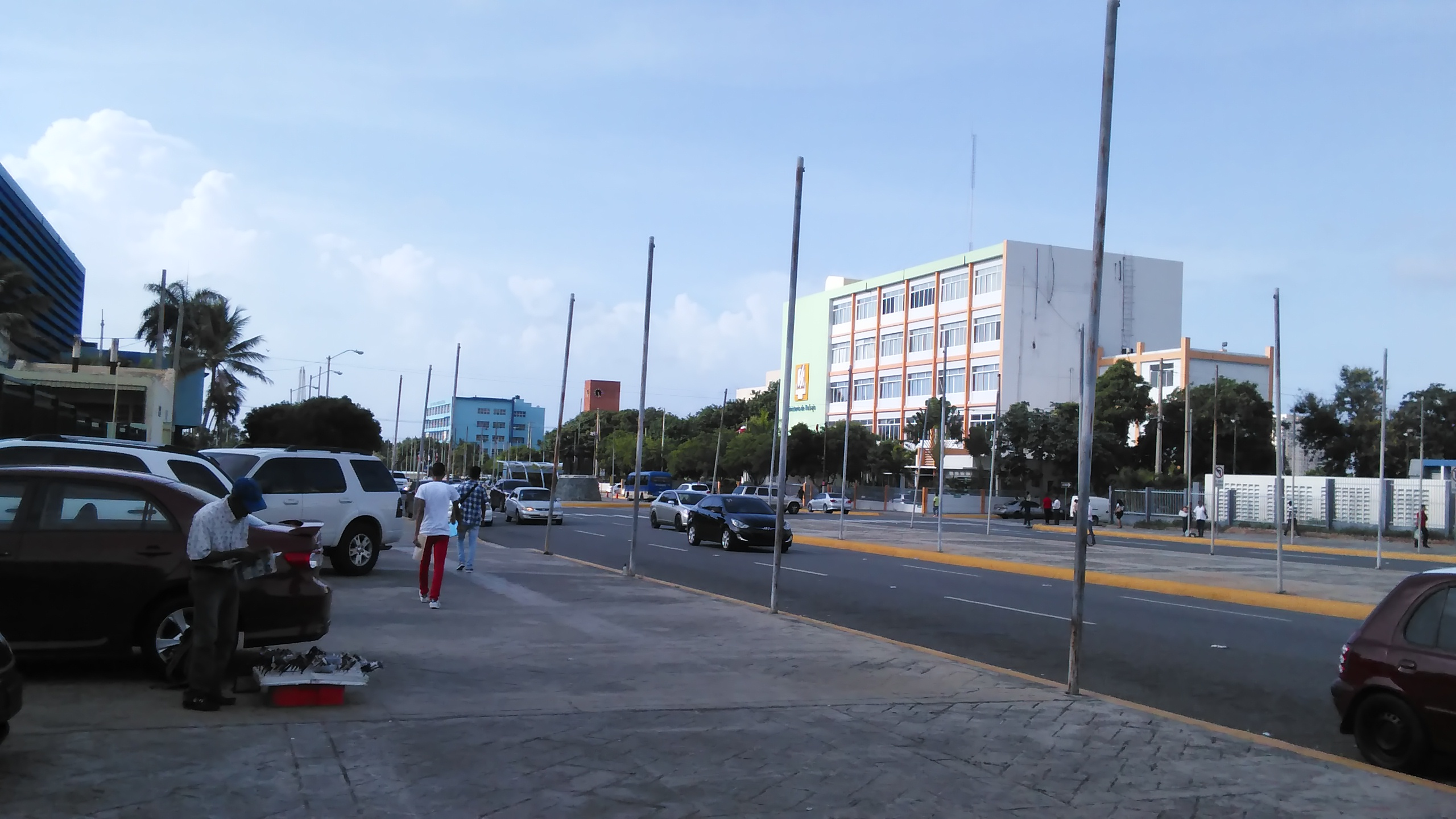
Ministries of the Dominican Republic

The ministries of the Dominican Republic are the primary units of the executive branch of the government of the Dominican Republic. The president appoints ministers as he sees appropriate.

==== Evolution of the government logo ====
2012–2020 (under the presidency of Danilo Medina)

2020–present (under the presidency of Luis Abinader)

=== Legislative branch ===
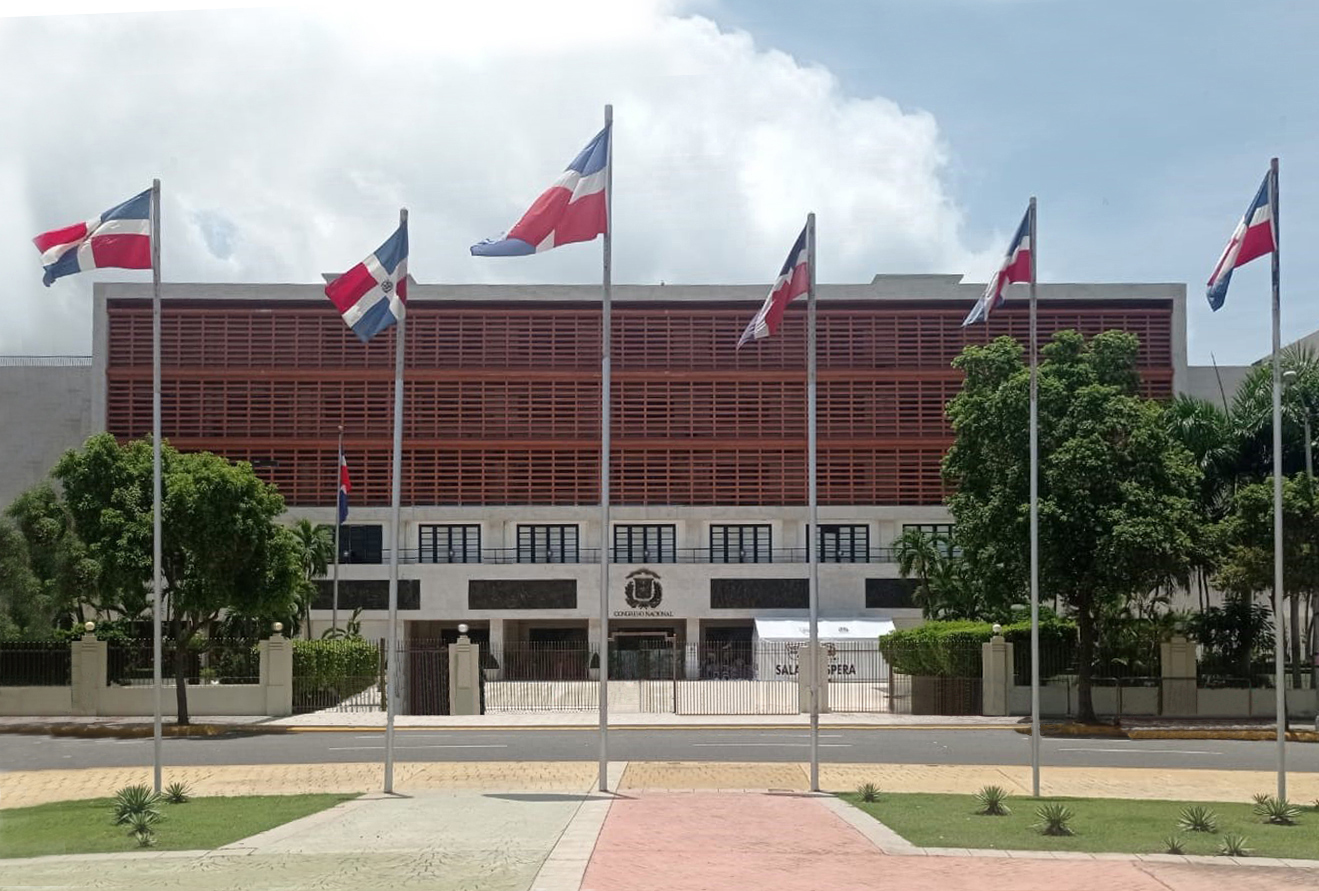
Palace of the National Congress, seat of the legislative branch

Legislative branch is exercised by a bicameral National Congress (Spanish: Congreso de la República). The upper house is the Senate (Spanish: Senado) with 32 members, elected for a four-year term in single-seat constituencies. The lower house is the Chamber of Deputies (Spanish: Cámara de Diputados) with 190 members, elected for a four-year term by proportional representation in accordance to each province, as follows: one deputy is elected for every 50,000 inhabitants plus fraction exceeding 25,000, but never less than two.

Among the attributions of the Senate are the following:

- Studying and approving laws.
- To appoint the president and other members of the Central Electoral Board and their deputies.
- To appoint the members of the Public Accounts Chamber.
- To approve or not the appointment of diplomatic agents made by the Executive.
- To decide on the claims of the Chamber of Deputies against public officers for misconduct or serious faults in the performance of their duties.
- In the event of public accusation, the Senate may only impose the sanction of removal from office. However, the removed officer may be subject to being tried according to the respective statutes, if applicable. For the removal of office, a vote of at least ¾ of all members of the Senate is required.

=== Judicial branch ===
Logo of the Supreme Court of the Dominican Republic (SCJ)

Flag of the Judiciary branch and the Supreme Court of Justice of the Dominican Republic

Escuela Nacional de la Judicatura (ENJ) (English: National Judicial College)

The Judicial branch is charged of administering justice in order to ensure the respect, protection and supervision of rights recognized under the Constitution and laws. Its higher organ is the Supreme Court of Justice, which is composed of 16 judges appointed by the National Council of the Magistracy, an entity created by the constitutional reform of 1994 to ensure the independence of the Judicial branch.

Apart from working as an appeals court for all judgments rendered by judicial courts, the Supreme Court supervises all judges in the Dominican territory. Its judicial and administrative functions may be summarized as follows:

- To decide on appeals as statutorily established.
- To decide as last instance on the matters that are under the jurisdiction of Appeals Courts as court of first instance.
- To decide as only instance on the criminal cases against the President and Vice-president of the Republic, Senators, Deputies, Ministers, Vice-ministers, Supreme Court Judges, Public General Attorney, Judges and General Attorneys of Appeals Courts, State attorneys of the Land Courts and Judges of Administrative Courts.
- To decide as only instance on the constitutionality of laws, at the request of the Executive Power, one of the Presidents of the legislative chambers or an interested party.
- To appoint the judges of the Appeals court, the Land courts, the Courts of First Instance, the Judges of Instruction, the Peace Courts and their deputies, the Administrative-Tax Court and the judges of any other judicial courts created by law, according to the provisions of the Law on Judicial Career.
- To exercise the highest disciplinary authority on all members of the Judicial Power, being able to impose sanctions such as suspension, removal or prison.
- To transfer provisionally or definitively from one jurisdiction to another, as it may deem necessary, the judges of the Appeals Court, the judges of First Instance of the Land Courts, the Judges of Instruction, the Peace Judges and other court judges created by law.
- To create the administrative positions that may be necessary to comply with the attributions granted by the Constitution and laws.
- To appoint all officers and employees of the Judicial Power.
- To determine the wages and other payments of Judges and administrative personnel belonging to the Judicial Power.

== Local government ==
Old logo of Ayuntamiento del Distrito Nacional (ADN) (National District City Council)

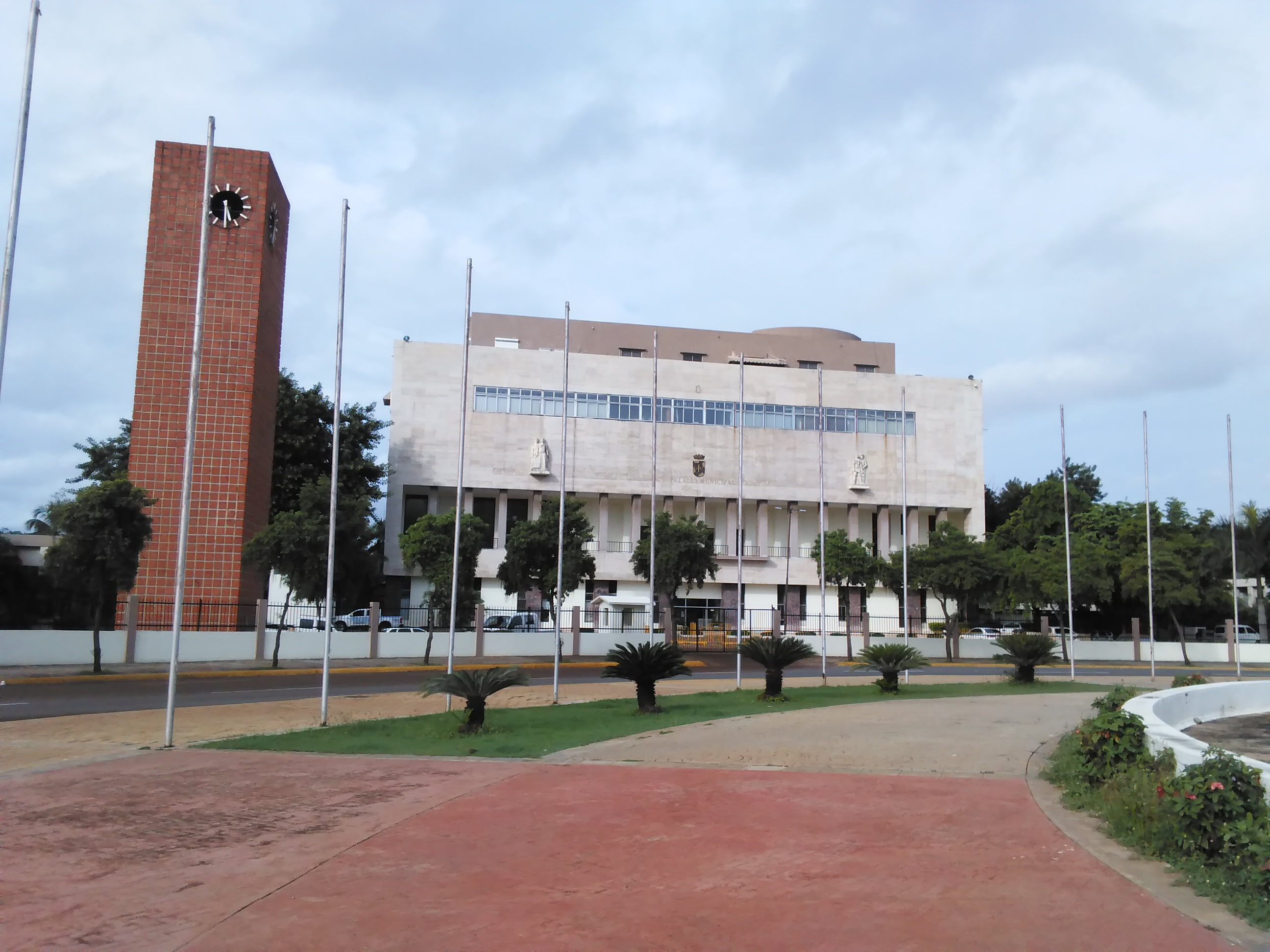
Ayuntamiento del Distrito Nacional (ADN) HQ (National District City Council)

Municipal mayors and council members are elected, and serve four-year terms.

=== Provincial and municipal government ===
There is a governor in every province; there is not a governor in Distrito Nacional, where is the capital of the country. The governors are only representatives of the president.

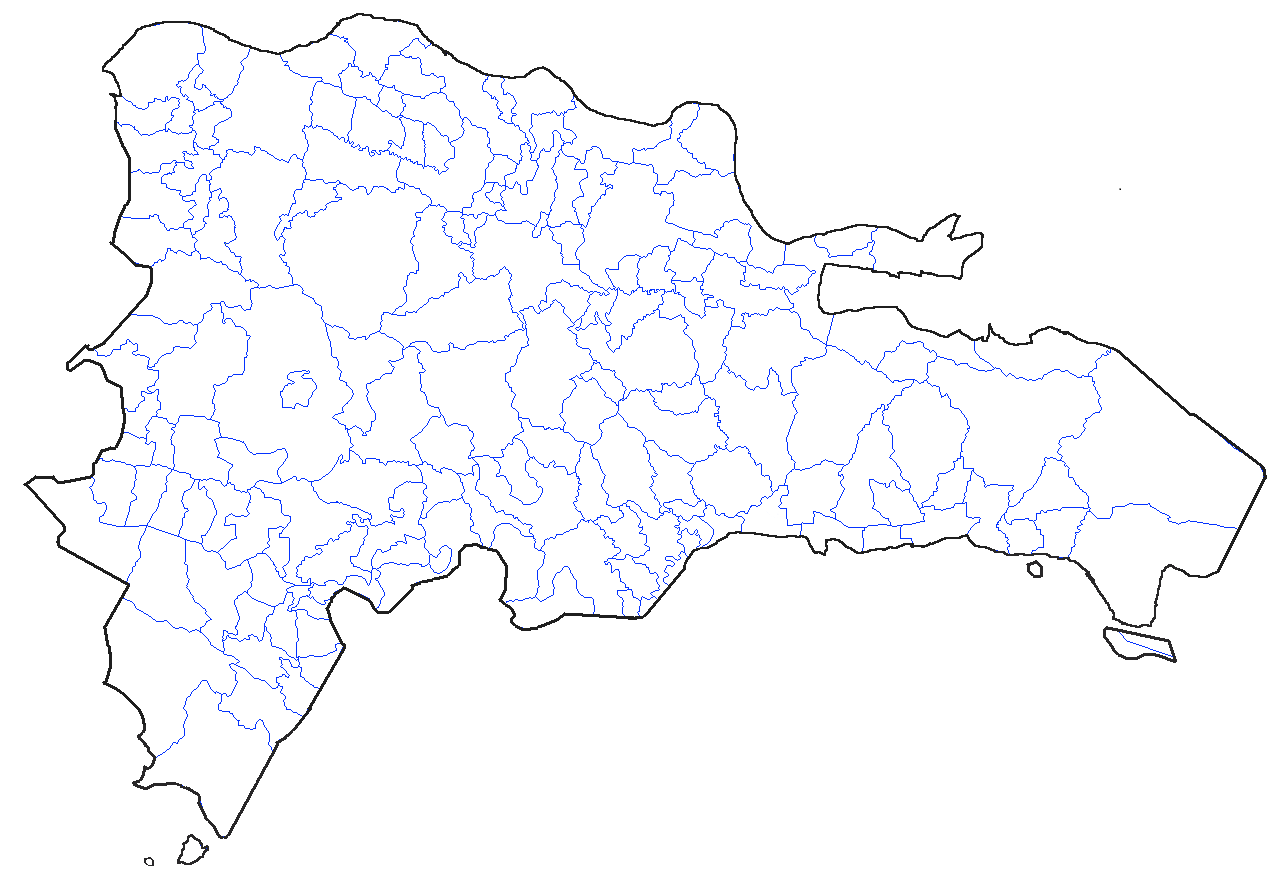
Municipalities of the Dominican Republic

Every province is divided into two or more municipalities (Spanish: municipios, singular municipio); the Distrito Nacional has only one municipality - Santo Domingo.

=== Municipalities ===
There are only two branches in the municipalities: the executive and the legislative. They are elected for four years by the people that lives in the municipality.

The Mayor (Síndico) is the head of the executive branch and the Municipal Council (Ayuntamiento) is the legislative branch.

The rural parts of a municipality are divided into Secciones (singular, Sección; in English, "section"); every Sección has a person which represents the municipal administration.

The Dominican Republic has 158 municipalities (municipios).

=== Municipal districts ===
A municipality can have one municipal district (distrito municipal) or more. A municipal council (Junta Municipal) for such a municipal district is elected by the municipal council of the municipality to which it belongs and not for the people that lives there.

There are 202 municipal districts (distrito municipal) in the Dominican Republic.

== Bodies with constitutional status ==
=== Constitutional Court ===
The Constitutional Court (Spanish: Tribunal Constitucional, TC) is an autonomous constitutional body responsible for guaranteeing the supremacy of the Constitution, defending the constitutional order and protecting fundamental rights. Established by the 2010 Constitution, it is the highest authority in matters of constitutional interpretation and judicial review. Its decisions are final and irrevocable and constitute binding precedents for public authorities and all state institutions, pursuant to Articles 184 and 185 of the Constitution and Law No. 137-11.

=== Central Electoral Board ===
Logo of the Central Electoral Board

The Central Electoral Board (Spanish: Junta Central Electoral, JCE) is an autonomous constitutional body responsible for organizing and directing elections and mechanisms of popular participation in the Dominican Republic. It has legal personality and technical, administrative, budgetary and financial independence. In addition to its electoral responsibilities, it administers the Civil Registry and the National Identity and Electoral Card system. Its constitutional functions are established in Article 212 of the Dominican Constitution.

=== Ombudsman ===
The Ombudsman (Spanish: Defensor del Pueblo) is an independent constitutional authority responsible for safeguarding fundamental rights and collective and diffuse interests. It oversees the actions of public officials and state institutions, as well as private entities providing public services, when their actions or omissions affect constitutionally protected rights. The institution was established by Law No. 19-01 of 2001 and subsequently incorporated into the 2010 Constitution under Articles 190–192, which establish its independence and administrative and budgetary autonomy.

=== Chamber of Accounts ===
The Chamber of Accounts (Spanish: Cámara de Cuentas de la República Dominicana) is the country's supreme external public audit institution. It is responsible for overseeing public finances, administrative processes and state assets. It has legal personality and technical character, with administrative, operational and budgetary autonomy. The institution consists of five members elected by the Senate of the Republic from shortlists submitted by the Chamber of Deputies for a four-year term. Its constitutional status and responsibilities are established in Articles 248–250 of the Dominican Constitution.

== See also ==
- Constitution of the Dominican Republic
- Law of the Dominican Republic
- Politics of the Dominican Republic
- Elections in the Dominican Republic
- List of political parties in the Dominican Republic
