= Country Alliance (Dominican Republic) =

Country Alliance Alianza País
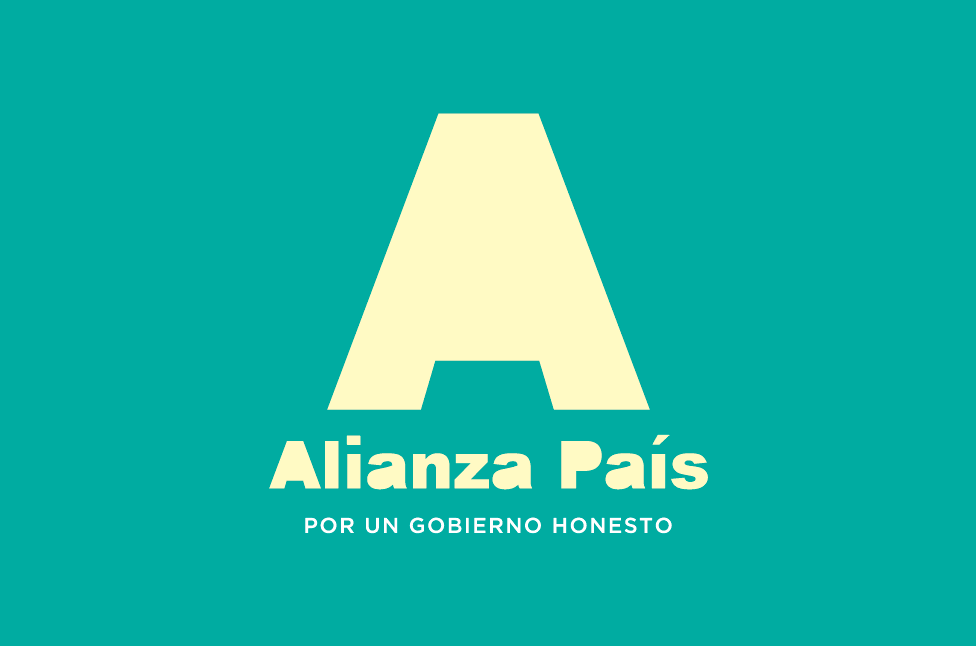
- President: Guillermo Moreno
- Founded: 20 February 2011
- Headquarters: Pasteur Avenue 55, Santo Domingo, Dominican Republic
- Ideology: Democratic socialism
- Political position: Center-left to left-wing
- Continental affiliation: São Paulo Forum
- Colors: Turquoise and Yellow Lemon
- Slogan: ¡Por un gobierno honesto! (For an honest government!)
- Chamber of Deputies: 2 / 190
- Senate: 1 / 32
- Mayors: 3 / 155

Website
- alianzapais.do

The Country Alliance (Spanish: Alianza País, ALPAÍS) is a political party in the Dominican Republic founded in 2011 by Guillermo Moreno and other citizens.

Despite being a recently formed party, it has had a relatively positive acceptance by the population, obtaining in some polls even around 15% sympathy, according to the Greenberg-Diario Libre pollster.

== History ==
=== Origins ===
For the 2008 presidential elections, a group of social, citizen and political organizations, protected under the name of "Citizen Political Volunteer", brought former attorney Guillermo Moreno García and social leader María Teresa Cabrera as candidates for the presidency and vice-presidency for the Movement for Independence, Unity and Change (MIUCA), obtaining 18,136 valid votes (0.44%).

After the results of these elections, on January 21, 2009, the book "Alianza: Una Propuesta de País" authored by Guillermo Moreno was put into circulation, which led to some 22 presentations in the country and abroad, conforming Citizen Support Groups, a process that ended in an assembly in the city of Santiago de los Caballeros on July 19, 2009, with the participation of the different citizen support groups that had been formed throughout the country. There it was decided to take the necessary steps to build an independent and alternative political option.

On October 15, 2009, in a national address, Guillermo Moreno announced the decision to seek recognition of the new political organization that would be called the "Country Alliance". In this way, the Alianza País party was officially founded on February 20, 2011, when its Constituent Assembly Juan Pablo Duarte held, in which its basic ideological definitions were approved, which include the guiding principles, objectives and strategic policies, working methods and their statutory norms. Similarly, it elected the members of its National Steering Committee and its president.

=== Electoral recognition ===
Country Alliance has gone through two recognition processes:

The first process, at the time of its constitution as a party, began on June 6, 2010, when, after 9 months of intense work, the books containing the names and generals of 85,000 citizens who deposit the names and generals of the Central Electoral Board are deposited. They supported the recognition of Country Alliance, organizing themselves by province and municipalities. In addition, the corresponding documentation is deposited for its constitution as a political organization. On February 4, 2011, by resolution No. 03-2011, the plenary of the Central Electoral Board recognized Country Alliance as a political party in accordance with the Constitution of the Dominican Republic and the Electoral Law.

The second process, after losing its jurisdiction before the Central Electoral Board after the 2012 elections, where it obtained 62,290 valid votes (1.37%), began on May 6, 2013, when the necessary documents for recognition were again deposited. This was accompanied by a recognition campaign called the "Campaign for the Million Friends" (CAMILA) in mid-August 2014, to structure a base of support for the 2016 general election. Despite meeting the requirements Formal, and the extensive CAMILA campaign, it was not until September 8, 2015, after more than a year and a half of pressure, that the Central Electoral Board again granted recognition to ALPAÍS.

=== Merger with Democratic Choice ===
As part of the negotiations for the 2020 elections, the party leadership entered into an alliance with the Democratic Choice (OD) party, founded by former deputy Minou Tavárez Mirabal and which had obtained recognition from the Central Electoral Board a few months ago, to carry joint candidacies at the presidential, congressional and municipal levels. For that purpose, both parties had planned to hold joint primary elections to elect their candidates on October 6, 2019. However, due to the requirements of the recently approved Law No. 33–18 on Parties, Groups and Electoral Movements, which requires newly created parties carry their own candidates in their first elections, OD was prevented from participating in the pact. On April 3, 2019, both parties accused the Central Electoral Board of boycotting its internal policy, and desisted from participating in the open primaries organized by said electoral body.

In response to these limitations, and in view of the JCE's refusal to accept joint candidacies, the leaderships of both parties chose to merge their political organizations. The merger pact was signed on July 31, 2019, and accepted by the Central Electoral Board on August 21 under resolution No. 18-19. The official act of the merger was held on August 25, 2019, maintaining Alianza País the longest standing legal personality and having elected authorities.

== Election results ==
Since its founding in 2011, Alianza País has participated in three presidential elections, two congressional elections and two municipal elections. At the presidential level, she has always participated with her own candidate, without alliances with other political parties recognized by the Central Electoral Board, and she has not been able to obtain victory to date. At the congressional level, he obtained his first deputy, Fidelio Despradel, for dragging votes nationally in 2016; as well as its first deputy by direct vote, José Horacio Rodríguez, in 2020. He has made local alliances with the Alliance for Democracy, the Broad Front and the Modern Revolutionary Party for certain congressional and municipal candidates.

=== President ===
Election	Presidential candidate	Vice-presidential candidate	Votes	%
2012	Guillermo Moreno García	Luisa Angélica Sherezada Vicioso	62,290	1.37
2016	Guillermo Moreno García	María Josefa Cantisano Rojas	84,399	1.83
2020	Guillermo Moreno García	Agustín González Morel	39,458	0.96

=== Congress ===
Election	Senate				Chamber			
Election	Votes	%	Seats	+/–	Votes	%	Seats	+/–
2016			1 / 190				0 / 32	
2020	68,662	1.77	1 / 190	Steady	55,422	1.44	2 / 32	▲2

=== Municipal ===
Election	Mayors		Aldermen		Directors		Vocals	
Election	Elected	+/–	Elected	+/–	Elected	+/–	Elected	+/–
2016	0 / 158		3 / 1,164		1 / 234		5 / 730	
2020	3 / 158 (Note: In local alliances with the Modern Revolutionary Party in Los Hidalgos, Rancho Arriba and Santo Domingo Este.)	▲3	1 / 1,164 (Note: In local alliance with the Modern Revolutionary Party in Santo Domingo Este.)	▼2	0 / 234	▼1	0 / 730	▼5

== Ideology ==
The ideological principles of the Country Alliance (also known as "guiding principles") revolve around left-leaning policies and the tendencies of progressivism, although in the Dominican Republic political parties aren't usually identified under a hard and pure ideological line.

These guiding principles are raised in 9 basic points, which are:

- The Equality legal and social of all human beings, without discrimination of social, economic, race, sex, gender, nationality, age, cultural identity, health status, disability, sexual orientation, religion, political or philosophical ideas.
- The democracy participatory and pluralist as the best form of government and social organization known to man.
- The political, economic and social freedom of human beings, especially civil and political freedoms, as a transversal axis for the construction of a new citizenship.
- Social justice, that is, equity and solidarity, as the main engine of economic relations in society.
- The State under a constitutional regimen of rights, guarantees and freedoms in favor of human beings and their coexistence, and against personalism, caudillism, privileges, corruption and impunity
- The legality and the rule of law as fundamental rectors of coexistence between individuals, as well as the relationship between individuals and the State.
- The attachment to the ethics of the rulers and powerful, denying the rupture between ethical principles and political practice.
- Respect for the sovereignty and independence of all foreign powers.
- International relations based on mutual respect, peace, cooperation, and the self-determination of peoples.

As a consequence of these principles, the Alianza País speech is based heavily on criticism of corruption and impunity (hence its motto "For an honest government!"), with respect to environment (especially against open-pit mining and mega-mining), to the inclusion of marginalized groups (mainly women, the elderly and youth) and respect and tolerance towards Haitian Immigrants and LGBT collectives.

In accordance with the objectives of the party, the ultimate goal of Alianza País is the establishment of the Duartian Republic, a concept linked to compliance with the guiding principles mentioned above, as it would have established in its nation project the father of the Dominican homeland Juan Pablo Duarte.

=== Structure and organization ===
Country Alliance has a mass political party structure, whose base of action may be party members, or supporters (also called "friends of Alianza País"). The "friend" has a voice, but no vote, in the decisions of the party.

The Country Alliance structure is composed of three types of organizations. These are backed by the statutory rules of the party, and correspond very diffusely to the functions of the political power of citizens. These three types of organisms are:

- Organisms of political leadership: are responsible for the organizational work, recruitment, promotion and construction of the party. They are the "executive" branch of the party.
  - The territorial nucleus, composed of a number between 7 and 15 members. It is the minimum unit of the party in a neighborhood, urbanization, sector or place.
  - The sectorial nucleus, composed of at least 7 members belonging to the same sector of society (sexual, labor, professional, generational ...).
  - The zonal council, composed of at least three territorial and / or sectorial nuclei. It is the intermediary body between the territorial / sectoral nucleus and the municipal coordination team.
  - A municipal coordination team for each municipality in the country; composed of between 7 and 25 members, who are the general coordinators and / or organizational secretaries of the zonal councils of said municipality.
  - A provincial council for each province of the country and for the National District; integrated by the general coordinators and / or organizational secretaries of the municipal teams of said province (in the case of the National District, by). There is also a council for Dominican communities abroad.
  - The national leadership, formed by the President, the Executive Secretary and the general coordinators of provincial and Distrito Nacional councils, in addition to the coordinators of their national commissions. It is the highest instance of the party at the national level when the National Assembly is not in session. In turn, each member of the national leadership is part of one of the following commissions:
    - The national political commission, made up of the President, the Executive Secretary, and at least 7 members elected by the national leadership. This executive and permanent commission is in charge of representing and directing the party at the national level.
    - The national work commissions, made up of a general coordinator and 15 of the members of the national leadership who do not belong to the political commission. These commissions are in charge of executing the party's internal policy regarding its organization, finances, communication, training and electoral matters.
- Deliberative bodies: they are responsible for decision-making and the construction of party policies. They are the "legislative" branch of the party.
  - The National Assembly, made up of members of the national leadership, and up to 10 representatives from each provincial council, the National District and Dominicans abroad. It meets every 4 years to choose the Party President, as well as to approve the internal rules and statutes of the party. It is the highest body of the party. It requires a minimum quorum of 33% of its members.
  - The Municipal Assemblies, made up of members of the municipal team, and up to 5 members from each territorial / sector nucleus. They meet every year to choose the coordinator of the municipal team, as well as to outline the guidelines of the municipality's work plan.
- Election bodies: they are responsible for choosing the party's candidates for the national elections. They are the "electoral" branch of the party.
  - The National Convention elects the party's presidential candidate.
  - The Provincial and Distrito Nacional Conventions are in charge of choosing the party candidates for senators and deputies for their respective provinces.
  - The Municipal Conventions are in charge of electing the party candidates for mayors and councilors for their respective municipalities, and for municipal directors and members for their respective municipal districts.
