= Guillermo Moreno García =

Dominican lawyer and politician

Guillermo Moreno
- Born: August 15, 1956 (age 70); Sabaneta, Santiago Rodríguez, Dominican Republic
- Education: PUCMM; Diplomatic School of Spain
- Occupations: lawyer and politician
- Political party: Country Alliance
- Opponent: Danilo Medina • Federico Antún Batlle • Vincho Castillo • Luis Abinader • Amable Aristy • Minou Tavárez Mirabal • Juan Cohen
- Spouse: Aura Celeste Fernández
- Children: 2
- Parents: Juan Isidro Moreno (father); Mercedes García Fernández (mother)
- Relatives: Domingo Moreno Jimenes (grandfather)

Guillermo Antonio Moreno García (born August 15, 1956) is a Dominican lawyer and politician, whom served as the District Attorney for the Distrito Nacional during the term 1996–1997. He's the president of the party Country Alliance.

== Early years and family ==
Moreno is the son of the writer and poet Juan Isidro Moreno and Mercedes García Fernández, being the first of seven brothers. His grandfather Domingo Moreno Jimenes was a great writer of the 20th century. He is also ancestral related to the former Dominican presidents Manuel Jimenes and his son Juan Isidro Jimenes.

Guillermo Moreno is a practicing lawyer, graduated from Law Degree at the PUCMM in 1980. In 1987, he obtained the title of Master in International Studies at the Diplomatic School of Spain.

== As a professional ==
His professional experiences include having been a Consultant to the International Program for the Eradication of Child Labor of the International Labour Organization (ILO-IPEC); Consultant to the UNICEF; He is currently coordinator of the Master in Criminal Procedure Law at the Pontificia Universidad Católica de Santiago; Dean of the "School of Law" of the Iberoamerican University (UNIBE); Drafting member of the Official Commission for the Review and Updating of the Code of Criminal Procedure (current Criminal Procedure Code; Co-drafting of the Statute of the Public Ministry; Founding Partner of the Moreno, Rodríguez & Sterling Law Office.

== As a politician ==
In his youth, he joined the movements that fought for respect for human rights, public liberties and democratic values in the 12-year-old government of Joaquín Balaguer.

Guillermo Moreno García was appointed Prosecutor of Santo Domingo, D.N. on August 21, 1996, and remained in office until September 27, 1997.

During his tenure several aspects stand out: A sustained effort to modernize, institutionalize and clean up the Ministry, as well as a determined fight against corruption, political crimes, the preservation of the rule of law against abuses of power.

He was removed a year after the constant pressure he received from the National Palace to vary the course of cases of administrative corruption that reached his office. The trigger for his dismissal was the corruption file in the National Lottery, for which officials from the administration of former President Joaquín Balaguer, businessmen and technicians of that institution were kept in prison.

=== Candidacy for the Presidency of the Dominican Republic ===
In 2007 Moreno is presented as a candidate for the presidency by a group of political forces, local movements, artists, intellectuals and independent citizens.

In 2008, Moreno ran as a candidate for the presidency for the Movement for Independence, Unity and Change (MIUCA), reaching 3% of the total. In 2009, it launched the movement Country Alliance to aspire to the Presidency of the Dominican Republic.

On July 6, 2010, the members of the "Country Alliance" movement submitted to the Central Electoral Board the documentation required for recognition as a political party, with the intention of participating in the presidential elections that they will celebrate in May 2012. On the 16th of the same month, in an interview carried out on the television program El Día, Guillermo Moreno outlined the three main axes under which Country Alliance is articulated: (1) Increase the productive capacity, the generation of employment and the export capacity of the Dominican Republic; (2) Draw up Public Policies that allow the enjoyment and enjoyment of fundamental social rights, especially a quality educational and health system and; (3) Strengthening of the Democratic Institution and the deepening of public and legal security and strengthening of transparency in the Dominican State El Día.

In February 2011, once the party was recognized, the General Electoral Assembly of Country Alliance decided to present it as a candidate for the Presidency of the Republic, being accepted by the Central Electoral Board and thus becoming the first candidate for the 2012 Dominican Republic presidential election.

== As a writer ==
Author and co-author of several publications on legal and political issues, including: Code of Criminal Procedure and Complementary Standards; Studies on Child Labor in Dominican Legislation; Criminal Justice of the Adolescent Person in the DR; Political Parties vs. Citizen Sovereignty; Subvert the Policy; and Political Parties and Democracy in the Dominican Republic. As a writer on legal and political issues, for more than two decades, in various national and foreign print media, the weekly columns stand out: “CPP”, in Diario Libre; "Legal Situation", in the Judicial Gazette Magazine; "Citizenship", in the Revista Ahora and continued in the disappeared weekly "Clave Digital".

In January 2009, he published his book "Alianza: Una Propuesta de País".

== Personal life ==
He is married to Aura Celeste Fernández, with whom he fathered Juan Domingo and Abel Guillermo.
