= Judiciary of the Dominican Republic =

Judiciary flag of the Dominican Republic.

The judiciary is one of the three branches of state that make up the government of the Dominican Republic. Its function is to administer justice, free of charge, to settle disputes between individuals or corporations, private or public, in every type of process, judgment and execution of judgment. They exercise for the courts, including the Supreme Court of the Dominican Republic, and tribunals established by the Constitution and the law.

== Courts ==
The courts are composed of four levels of courts. The Supreme Court of the Dominican Republic is the court of last resort existing in the Republic and is, therefore, the head of the judiciary in the country. The Supreme Court is the final court empowered to administer justice, that means that its judgments cannot be appealed, although they may eventually be reviewed by the same court through the use of re-consideration.

The Dominican Republic Courts of Appeal know, appeals to judgments, in accordance with the law; in the first instance of criminal cases to trial judges or their equivalents; tax attorneys, holders of organs and autonomous and decentralized state, provincial governors, mayors of the National District and the municipalities; and, other matters specified by law.

The Dominican Republic Courts of First Instance known in first grade of all the materials that do not are responsible by law to another court and other matters assigned to them expressly Act manner. There will be the Courts of First Instance or equivalent to the number of judges and territorial jurisdiction determined by law. Courts First Instance of the relevant judicial districts to the National District, Santiago, La Vega, Duarte, Puerto Plata, Barahona, San Juan, San Cristóbal, El Seibo, San Pedro de Macorís, La Romana, Valverde, Espaillat and Monte Cristi they are divided into chambers.

The Dominican Republic Peace Courts are single-judge courts and the judicial pyramid structure are lower-level courts. The law determines the number of Justices of the Peace and their equivalents, powers, territorial jurisdiction and how they will be organized.

=== Other Courts ===
- Special courts of Transits. They are competent to hear offenses for violation of Law no. 241 of December 28, 1967, Transit Vehicle and its amendments.
- Peace Courts for Municipal Affairs. Aware of all violations of laws, ordinances, regulations and municipal resolutions.

== Judges ==
It is understood by appointing judges, their appointment to judicial office for the first time, becoming part of the judicial career, in which case it is called "admission to the judicial career", or the appointment of the judge who, belonging and to that race happens to occupy, by any of the mechanisms regulated by the Law on Judicial Service, in its implementing regulations and the National Judicial College, a different function he occupied, the This is called "provision of judicial office".

=== Supreme Court Judges ===
The judges of the Supreme Court are appointed by the National Council of the Magistracy, in accordance with Article 179 of the Constitution of the Republic and the Organic Law of the National Council of the Magistracy.

When choosing the judges of the Supreme Court, the National Council of the Magistracy have which of them should occupy the presidency and designate a first and second substitute to replace the President in case of absence or disability. The President and his deputies shall exercise these functions for a period of seven years, after which, and after performance evaluation conducted by the National Council of the Magistracy, may be elected for a new period.

In case of vacancy of a judge invested with one of the above stated qualities, the National Council of the Magistracy shall appoint a new judge with equal quality or attribute it to any of the judges of the Supreme Court.

=== Other judges ===
To be appointed judge of the Judiciary, every candidate must undergo a public competitive examination system by joining the National Judicial College to be established by the law and have successfully passed the training program of the school.

== Administration ==
=== Council of the Judiciary Branch ===
According to Art. 2 of the Law 28/11, Organic Council of the Judiciary, it is the constitutional organ of management and discipline of the Judiciary of the Dominican Republic.
