= Country Alliance =

Country Alliance may refer to:

- Australian Federation Party, a political party in Australia formerly known as the Country Alliance
- Country Alliance (Dominican Republic), a political party in the Dominican Republic
- Countryside Alliance, a British organisation
- PAIS Alliance, a political alliance in Ecuador
