= Corte Suprema de Justicia =

Corte Suprema de Justicia, Spanish for Supreme Court of Justice, may refer to:

- Supreme Court of Argentina
- Supreme Court of Bolivia
- Supreme Court of Chile
- Supreme Court of Justice of Colombia
- Supreme Court of Justice of Costa Rica
- Supreme Court of the Dominican Republic
- Supreme Court of El Salvador
- Supreme Court of Justice of Guatemala
- Supreme Court of Honduras
- Supreme Court of Mexico (Mexico)
- Supreme Court of Justice of Paraguay
- Supreme Court of Peru
- Supreme Court of Uruguay
- Supreme Court of Justice of Venezuela
