= National Judicial College (Dominican Republic) =

- Escuela Nacional de la Judicatura (Spanish)
- Type: Academy
- Established: 1998
- Founder: Supreme Court of the Dominican Republic
- Affiliations: National Council of the Magistracy
- Religious affiliation: Catholic
- Budget: DOP 138,021,835.05
- Officer in charge: Executive Director
- Chancellor: Mariano German Mejia
- Dean: Gervasia Valenzuela Sosa
- Location: César Nicolás Penson No.59, Gazcue, Distrito Nacional, Santo Domingo, Dominican Republic
- Language: Spanish; Latin
- Website: http://www.enj.org
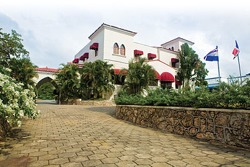

The National Judicial College (Spanish: Escuela Nacional de la Judicatura, ENJ) is the body that is responsible for training and ongoing formation of all servers in the Dominican Judiciary. As an educational institution is recognized by the National Council of Higher Education as a Specialized Institute of Higher Studies.

== Educational model ==
This institution designed its educational model based on the theories of constructivism, where the user is the center of the formation. About user, teacher-student relationships are designed, evaluation and develops educational resources. Under these arrangements the teacher assumes the role of guide, counselor of academic work. The evaluation is characterized by continuous, permanent feedback generated by the input of continuous improvement; educational resources become means of support for the training. School has maintained a permanent link with the national and international legal community as an element that links judges and public defenders with the social reality that must give an answer in the exercise of their functions. Teaching methodology combines presentiality and virtuality, theory and practice.

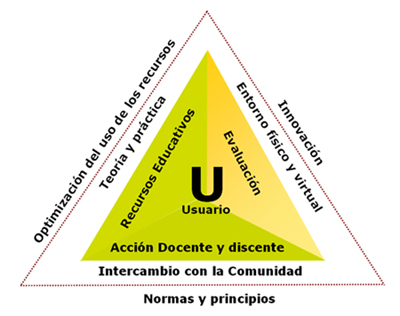
Educational Model

Based on this educational model, they are evaluated and improvements to each of the constituent elements are implemented. Recording and documenting the events identified subject to correction and improvement, giving due systematizing lessons learned and corrective and preventive actions to be taken. The institution makes a difference and imposes its criteria of quality, unique school, with its regulations, its constant innovation process and the proper use of its human, financial and technological resources.

=== Programs ===
- Candidate Training Program. This program is intended to train future system servers administration of justice. Training includes programs Candidate Magistrate, Public Defender, Judicial Research and Social Worker.
- Continuing Education Program. This program ensures the continuous training of all officers of the judiciary (judges and employees). It includes areas of study: Constitutional Law, Private and Administrative Law, Criminal Law, Functional and Integrated Training.

=== Titles ===
- Master of Judicial Law
- Specialization in Expository Writing Argumentative and Judicial Decisions
- Specialization in Public Defender

== History ==
The National Council of Magistracy of the Dominican Republic, appointed in 1997 the Supreme Court, in compliance with what established the Constitution of 1994 and beginning the process of judicial reform. The main challenge at the time, was to assert the independence of the judiciary and promote the development of the system of administration of justice, attached to ethics and law. It was essential the creation of a top training center for judges, since the Supreme Court, as soon as they took office, appointed new judges in courts throughout the country, who needed to be trained according to best practices court.

That was how the February 12, 1998, by resolution of the Plenum of the Supreme Court, was born the School of Magistrates. Later on August 11, 1998, it was enacted Judicial Career Law, which was formally constituted as the National Judicial College, a body under the Dominican Judiciary and with the mission to train civil servants of the judiciary institution .

With no background in the country of training for the training of judges, they proceeded to explore the best practices of Latin American law schools, and establish links with entities and consultants that could help direct the first steps of the school. structure and management, whose servers were selected by public tender was then formed. It was thus, as in 1998 he was selected the first Board, composed of judges Jorge A. Subero Isa, Victor Jose Castellanos, Arelis Ricourt Aníbal Gómez and Claudio Medrano. Likewise, doctors Juan Manuel Pellerano and Babado Diego Torres, the lawyer director Luis Henry Molina; international consultants, national teachers and, later, to aspiring judges.

Fulfilling the purpose for which it was created, the National Judicial College expanded its mission, focusing on contributing to excellence in the system of administration of justice, and it implemented a set of programs designed to meet all training needs of the members of the Judiciary and those who aspired to be part of it. This included cooperation with training and renewal of other players in the justice sector, while it has intent to enrich the national legal acquis and the relationships between the various actors in national legal community internationally.

The scope of work and for 2002, by resolution of the Plenum of the Supreme Court, the School receives the task of training all those who aspire to be part of the Public Defender (the latter was born the same year under the wings of the Supreme Court). This assignment was confirmed by the Law 277-04 created the National Public Defense Service.

Since 2001, the School has formed 13 of aspiring Magistrate, nine groups of aspiring Public Defender, four for Social Worker programs and five for Judicial Research.

== Sharing knowledge ==
At the international level the National Judicial College has developed a significant presence in the field of judicial training. It was the General Secretariat of the Latin American Network of Judicial Schools (RIAEJ) for ten years (2001-2011), currently composed of more than 60 judicial training centers throughout Latin America, among which there are 2 subnets (Schools Network judicial of the Argentine provinces and the Network of judicial Schools States of Mexico).

The RIAEJ is a community liaison for cooperation and mutual support between judicial schools and public centers of judicial training Iberoamérica. The RIAEJ has its origin in the VI Ibero-American Summit of Presidents of Supreme Courts and Supreme Courts of Justice, held in the Canary Islands, Spain, in May 2001. In September of that same year held its first general assembly in Puerto Rico in which the NRA was he chosen unanimously to host the Secretariat of the Network. in its category seat of the secretariat, became responsible for coordinating the work of this and facilitation of its relations with agencies national and international and other related institutions.

Currently the School is board member of the Judicial Training Centre for Central America and the Caribbean (CCJCC) from where starts training for members. Training activities center are aimed at judges, judges, magistrates and judges in the region.
