= Elections in the Dominican Republic =

The Dominican Republic is a unitary state with elected officials at the national and local levels. On a national level, head of state, the President, is elected directly by the people. The national legislature, the Congress of the Republic (Congreso de la República), is divided into two chambers: the Chamber of Deputies and the Senate. There are also elected offices at the local level (municipalities or cities and municipal districts). It is estimated that across the whole country, over four thousand offices are filled in every electoral cycle.

The Dominican Republic has a multi-party system, The Constitution define how elections are held and the eligibility of voters. The law regulates most aspects of the election, including primaries, the running of each electoral college, and the running of national and local elections.

The financing of elections has been a controversial part of it, because private sources make up substantial amounts of campaign contributions, especially in presidential election. Voluntary public funding for candidates have no spending limits. The Central Electoral Board (Spanish: Junta Central Electoral, JCE), created in 1923 is the organism with the responsibility of organization, direction and supervision of the elections. The Superior Electoral Tribunal (Spanish: Tribunal Superior Electoral, TSE), created in 2010, is the competent body to judge and decide on electoral disputes and issues rulings on disputes arising internally in the parties or between them. Both TSE and JCE are autonomous institutions. The Central Electoral Board have technical, administrative, budgetary and financial independence, while the Superior Electoral Tribunal have organizational, administrative and financial independence.

== Voting ==
=== Method ===
The Dominican Republic use a mixed system composed of the three most common methods used worldwide. For presidential election a two-round system is used, where if no candidate receives a required number of votes then there is a runoff between the two candidates with the most votes, for senators election the first-past-the-post system is used, where the highest polling candidate wins the election, and for deputies election the D'Hondt method is used.

=== Eligibility ===
The eligibility of an individual for voting is set out in the constitution. The constitution states that suffrage is a right and a duty of all citizens, and the vote is personal, free, direct and secret, and no one can be obligated or coerced in an exercise of their right to vote or to reveal his decision. Constitution, also, denied the vote to members of the Armed Forces and National Police, and ban all people who have lost or have suspended his citizen rights, like convicted criminals or accused of treason from voting for a fixed period of time or indefinitely. The number of Dominican adults who will be eligible to vote in 2016 elections are projected to be 7.2 million.

=== Voter registration ===
Voter registration in the Dominican Republic is automatic and based on a database of the Civil Registry in charge of the JCE; resident foreigners possess a (Cédula de Identidad y Electoral) "Identity and Electoral Document" (The Dominican Republic ID National Card) which is unique for each individual and never re-used after a person's death. All Dominicans and eligible foreigners are added automatically to the electoral roll of the first election year they are able to vote and placed on the "electoral circumscription" based on their last reported address with the correspondent Circumscription Office of Civil State.

=== Voting equipment ===
At election day, the polling places are public and private schools and other government owned places like sport venues and community socials clubs. At every electoral table (mesa electoral) are place a singular number of voting booth where people can mark they ballots and after that deposit at the ballot box identify with the same letter of the ballot (For 2016 elections it will use 5 different ballots: Ballot A for President and Vice President; Ballot B for Senator; Ballot C for Deputies; Ballot D for Mayor, and E for Councillors.

Additional to the check and firm at the Electoral Roll, all people that vote after receive their ID Card back is marked with an electoral ink mark in the index finger.

== Levels of election ==
=== National elections ===
The Dominican Republic has a full presidential system of government, which means that the executive and legislature branch are totally independent, and they are elected together but separately from local government. Article 209 of the Constitution of the Dominican Republic established that election for the Dominican Republic President and Vice President along with legislative representatives must occur on third Sunday of May, while elections for local governments elections must be elected on third Sunday of February. All of them in the same year, simultaneously every four years.

==== Presidential elections ====
The president and the vice president are elected together in a presidential election. It is a direct election, with the winner being determined by percentage of votes cast by the people. The winner of the election is the candidate with at least 50.1 percent of valid votes. Due to province population difference, it is possible for a candidate to win the most provinces' votes, and lose the nationwide popular vote (receiving fewer votes nationwide than the election winner who, almost always, wins in most popular provinces).

==== Congressional elections ====
Elections to Congress take place every four years. Congress has two chambers. Special elections can occur between if a member dies or resigns during a term, for this case, an internal election is held at the correspondent chamber from a terna presented by the Executive Committee of the winning party.

Congressional elections occur every four years, correlated with presidential elections.

===== Senate elections =====
The Senate has 32 members, elected for a four-year term in single-seat constituencies (1 from each province and the Distrito Nacional).

===== Chamber of Deputies elections =====
The Chamber of Deputies has 195 members, elected for a four-year term in single-seat constituencies. Chamber of Deputies elections are held every four years on the third Sunday of May in leap years. Chamber elections are D'Hondt method elections that elect, as minimum, two Deputies from each of 31 provinces and the National District in concordance with the circumscriptions as is divided the Dominican Republic.

=== Local elections ===
At the local level, cities government positions elections are held in a nationwide modality every four years on the third Sunday of February in leap year, coinciding in a single Election Year with the presidential and congressional elections.

== Schedule ==
=== Election ===
Basic rotation of Dominican Republic general elections (fixed-terms only^{[1]})
Year	2016	2017	2018	2019	2020
Type	General	None	None	None	General
President	Yes	No			Yes
Senate	Yes	No			All 32 Seats
Chamber	Yes	No			All 190 Seats
Municipal	All Seats (159 municipality councils and 224 municipal districts executives and representatives seats)	No			All Seats (Number of councils and municipal districts TBD)
Other local offices and Referendums	Varies from province-to-province depending on the reason of election.				

^{1} This table does not include special elections, which may be held to fill political offices that have become vacant between the regularly scheduled elections.
^{2} The Congressional and Municipal Elections scheduled to be held on May 16, 2014 were merged with the Presidential Elections and rescheduled to be held in a single General election on the third Sunday of May (May 15, 2016) following Constitution modification in 2010. The 2020 Municipal Elections will be separated again and be held on the third Sunday of February while Presidential and Congressional Elections will continue to be held on the third Sunday of May, all for a four-year term. So, by exception the Senators and Deputies elected on May 16, 2010 will be serving for a longer term of six years, until 2016.

=== Inauguration ===
Position	2016	2017	2018	2019	2020
Type	General	None			General
President and Vice president	August 16	None			August 16
National Congress	August 16	None			August 16
Cities and municipalities (Local)	August 16	None			April 24

== See also ==
- Electoral calendar
- Electoral system
