= 2008 Dominican Republic presidential election =

Election in the Dominican Republic

- 16 May 2008
- Turnout: 71.36% (▼1.48pp)
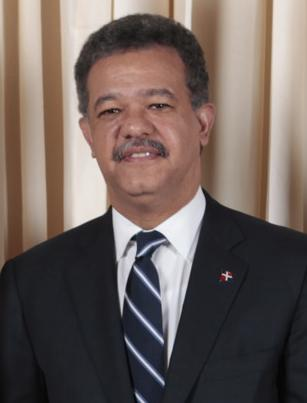

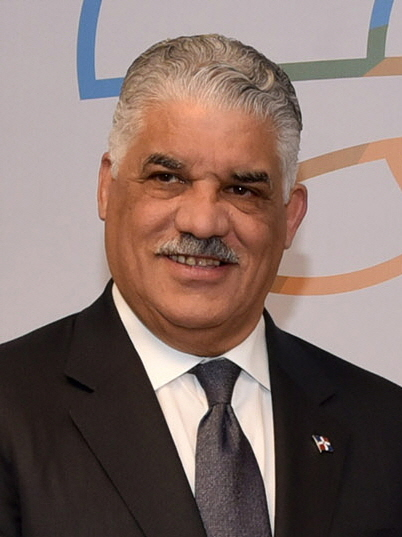
Nominee	Leonel Fernández	Miguel Vargas
Party	PLD	PRD
Popular vote	2,199,734	1,654,066
Percentage	53.83%	40.48%
- Results by province
President before election
Leonel Fernández
PLD
Elected President
Leonel Fernández
PLD

Presidential elections were held in the Dominican Republic on 16 May 2008. The result was a victory for incumbent President Leonel Fernández of the Dominican Liberation Party.

== Opinion polls ==
Pollster	Date	Sample	Fernández	Vargas	Aristy	Estrella
Noxa-Cies	21–26 April 2008	1,600	54%	36%	9%	1%
Noxa-Cies	March 2008		54%	30%	8%	1%
Noxa-Cies	February 2008		45%	31%	13%	2%
Noxa-Cies	20–25 October 2007	1,600	42%	30%	17%	–

== Results ==
Candidate	Party	Votes	%
Leonel Fernández	Dominican Liberation Party	2,199,734	53.83
Miguel Vargas	Dominican Revolutionary Party	1,654,066	40.48
Amable Aristy	Social Christian Reformist Party	187,645	4.59
Eduardo Estrella	Revolutionary Social Democratic Party	19,309	0.47
Guillermo Moreno García	Movement for Independence, Unity and Change	18,136	0.44
Pedro de Jesús Candelier	Popular Alliance Party	6,118	0.15
Trajano Santana	Independent Revolutionary Party	1,533	0.04
Total		4,086,541	100.00
Valid votes		4,086,541	99.34
Invalid/blank votes		27,103	0.66
Total votes		4,113,644	100.00
Registered voters/turnout		5,764,387	71.36
Source: IFES
