= National Palace (Dominican Republic) =

Residence and office of the president of the Dominican Republic

- Palacio Nacional (Spanish)
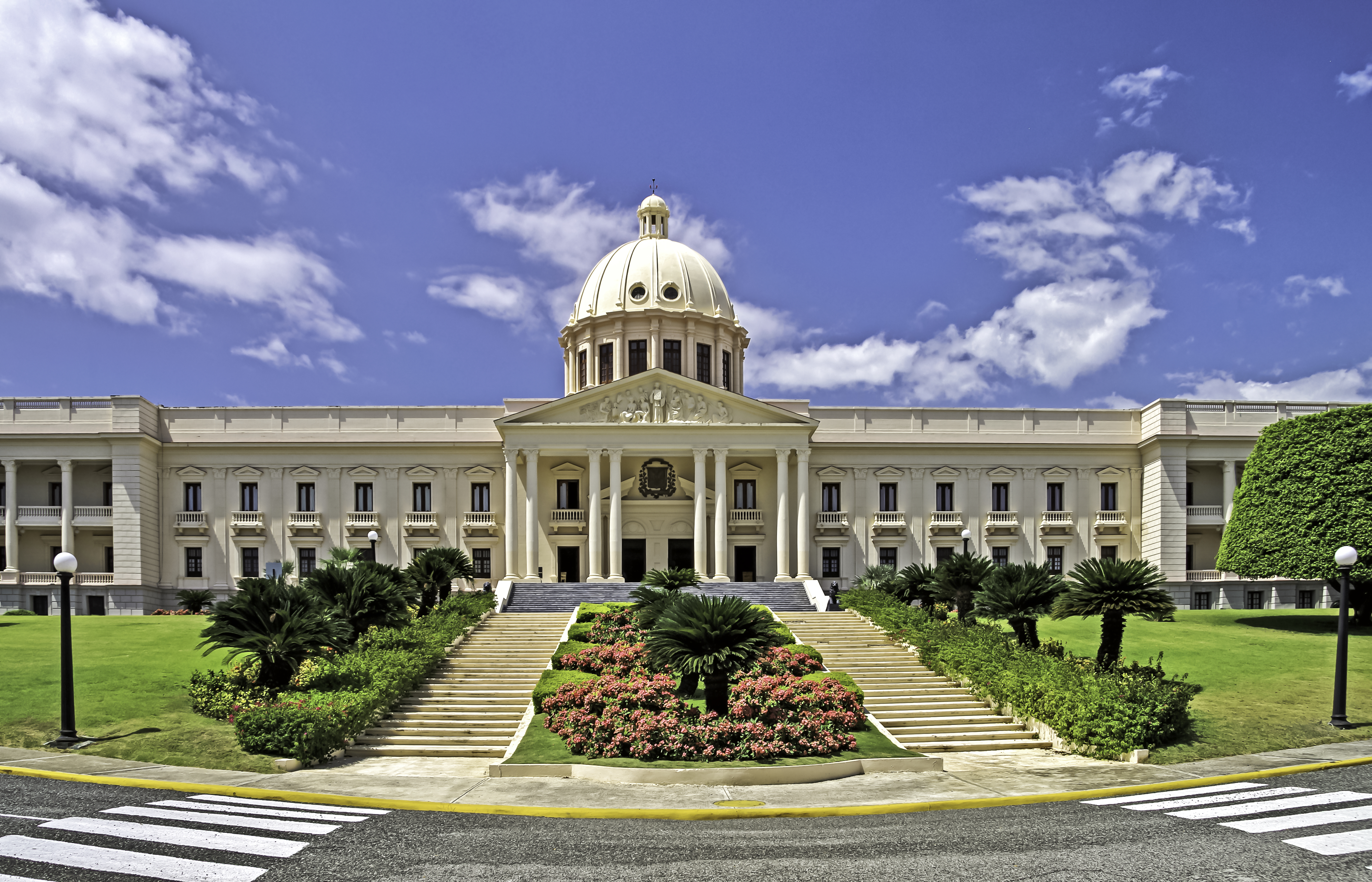
- Main façade (south) of the Palacio Nacional (2016)

General information
- Type: Official residence
- Architectural style: Neoclassical
- Location: Avenida México, esquina Calle Doctor Delgado, Gascue, Santo Domingo, Distrito Nacional, 10205, Dominican Republic
- Coordinates: 18°28′27″N 69°53′52″W
- Construction started: February 27, 1944; 82 years ago
- Completed: August 16, 1947
- Client: President of the Dominican Republic; Vice President of the Dominican Republic; Official headquarters of the Government of the President of the Dominican Republic; Ministry of the Presidency (MINPRE); Administrative Ministry of the Presidency (MAPRE); Directorate of Strategy and Government Communication (DIECOM)
- Owner: Dominican state

Technical details
- Floor area: 18,000 m^{2} (190,000 sq ft)

Design and construction
- Architect: Guido D'Alessandro

Website
- palacionacional.gob.do (in Spanish)

Palacio Nacional (English: National Palace) is a building in Santo Domingo, that houses the offices of the executive branch (presidency and vice presidency) of the Dominican Republic.

== History ==
Designed in a restrained neoclassical style by Italian architect Guido D'Alessandro at the behest of Rafael Trujillo, construction started on February 27, 1944—the centenary of Dominican independence—and was inaugurated on August 16, 1947. Occupying an area of 18,000 square metres and luxuriously appointed throughout, the National Palace is considered one of the most beautiful buildings built in the Dominican Republic.

The building stands on the grounds of the former Presidential Mansion (Mansión Presidencial), built during the United States occupation of the Dominican Republic (1916–1924)

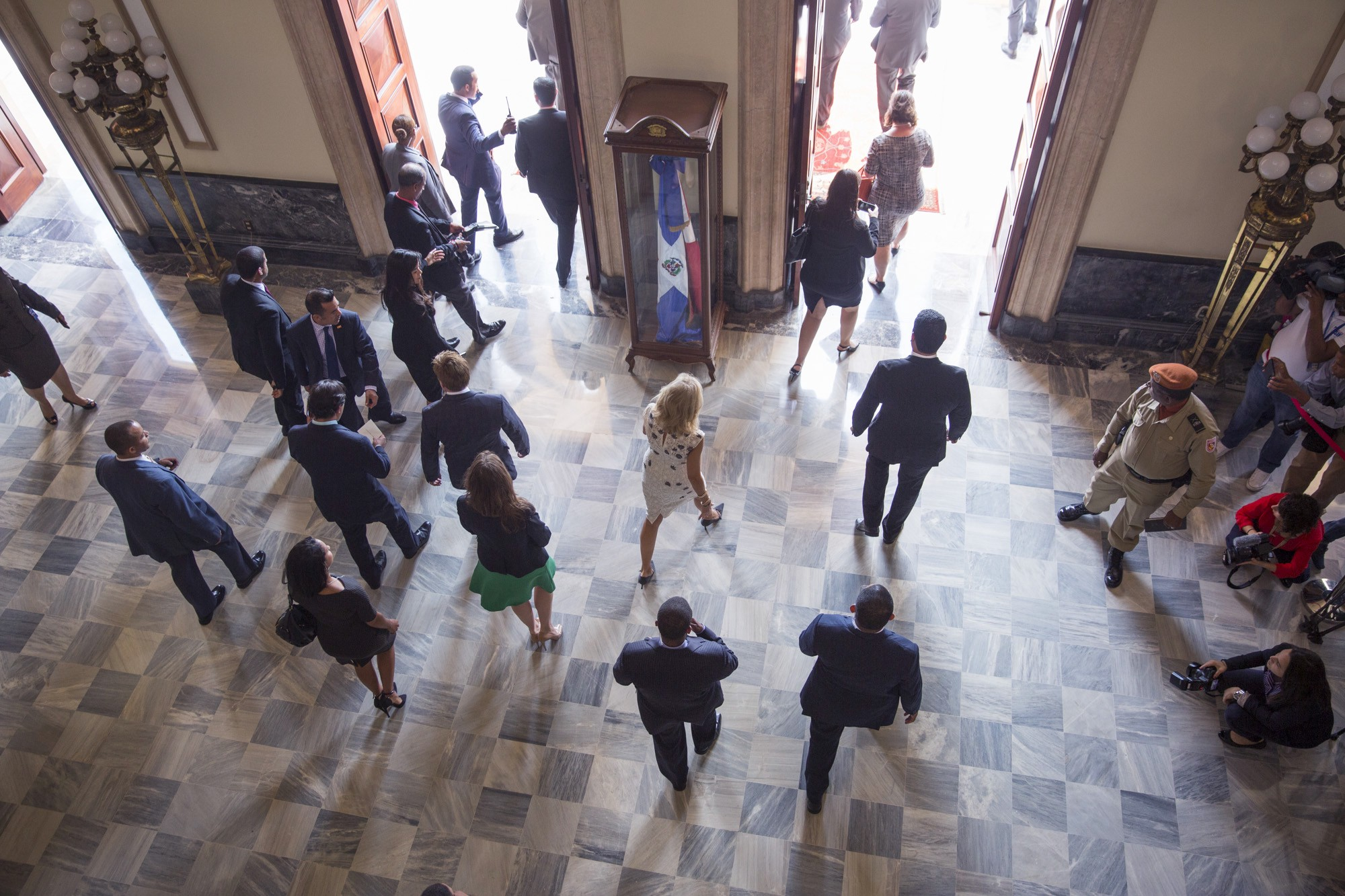
Dominican Republic national palace entrance interior

== In popular culture ==
The Palace and mainly the Hall of the Caryatids was used for the new year's scene in The Godfather Part II where Michael confronts Fredo about his betrayal.
