= Democratic Choice (Dominican Republic) =

Political party in the Dominican Republic

Democratic Choice Opción Democrática
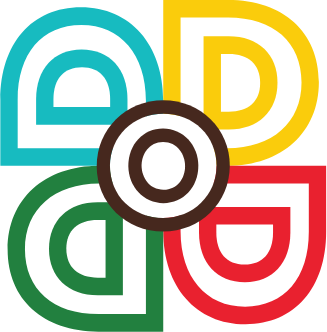
- Abbreviation: OD
- President: José Horacio Rodríguez
- Secretary-General: Miguel Alejandro Martínez
- Vice-President: Alexandra Sued
- Founder: Minou Tavárez Mirabal
- Founded: November 21, 2014; 12 years ago
- Split from: Dominican Liberation Party
- Headquarters: 18°27′22″N 69°57′09″W; Plaza Cupido Realty, Avenida 27 de Febrero 411, El Millón, Santo Domingo, Distrito Nacional, 10142, Dominican Republic
- Youth wing: Guardianes de la Democracia ("Guardians of Democracy")
- Ideology: Social democracy Progressivism; Environmentalism; Democratic socialism Feminism; Secularism
- Political position: Centre-left to left-wing
- Regional affiliation: São Paulo Forum
- Colors: Brown, blue, red, yellow and green
- Slogan: ¡Hagamos que suceda! ("Let's make it happen!")
- Senate: 0 / 32
- Chamber of Deputies: 0 / 190
- Mayors: 0 / 155
- Central American Parliament: 0 / 20

Party flag

Website
- od.org.do (in Spanish)

Headquarters in Santo Domingo (2026)

Democratic Choice (Spanish: Opción Democrática, OD) is a centre-left political party in the Dominican Republic founded in 2014 by Minou Tavárez Mirabal and other volunteers.

== History ==
Democratic Choice was announced in a public letter to the media following Minou Tavárez Mirabal's split from the Dominican Liberation Party in 2014. The party was officially recognized as a political party by the Central Electoral Board in 2018.

== Opción Democrática 2.0 ==
Following the restoration of its legal status, Opción Democrática held its National Convention on October 30, 2022. During this event, the party’s statutes, principles, and Political Leadership comprising party president Minou Tavárez Mirabal, vice president José Horacio Rodríguez, and secretary general Franiel Genao Núñez, along with 16 other national leaders were approved. The elections were conducted in accordance with democratic principles, utilizing a digital voting system that allowed for broad participation both from those present in person and those who chose to vote online thereby ensuring meaningful inclusion for citizens across various geographic locations, both within the country and abroad.

== Ideology ==
The party runs on a broadly progressive agenda emphasizing institution-building, diversity and equality of political participation and improving democracy.

== Election results ==
=== Presidential elections ===
Election	Candidate	Running mate	First Round		Second Round		Result
Election	Candidate	Running mate	Votes	%	Votes	%	Result
2024	Virginia Antares Rodríguez	Ico Abreu	25,204	0.58%	—N/a	—N/a	Lost ✗

=== Congressional elections ===
Year	Votes	%	Chamber seats	+/−	Position	Senate seats	+/−	Position
2020	—	—	1 / 190	New	—	0 / 32	New	—
2024	30,337	0.74%	0 / 190	▼1	—	0 / 32	0	—

=== Central American Parliament elections ===
Year	Votes	%	PARLACEN seats	+/−	Position
2024	19,043	0.46%	0 / 20	New	—
