= List of provincial governors in the Dominican Republic =

The Governors are the Executive authorities of each Dominican Province.

== List of Governors ==
Province	Name	Date Appointed	Party
Azua	Angela Maruja Perez	August 16, 2020	PRM
Bahoruco	Luis Emilio Medina	August 7, 2008	PLD
Barahona	Pedro Peña Rubio	September 10, 2012	PLD
Dajabón	Fiordaliza Caridad Ceballos	September 9, 2012	PLD
Distrito Nacional	Roberto Esmerito Salcedo	April 3, 2002	PLD
Duarte	Miledys Núñez	September 1, 2012	PRD
El Seibo	Jesús Rafael Mejía	September 10, 2012	PLD
Elías Piña	Fernando Fortuna	September 7, 2012	PLD
Espaillat	Andrés Dilonés Ovalles	September 7, 2012	PRD
Hato Mayor	Guadalupe Jáquez	September 27, 2012	PRD
Hermanas Mirabal	Juana Cristina Mateo	August 16, 2020	PLD
Independencia	Vianey Medina	September 2, 2012	PLD
La Altagracia	Lisette Nicasio de Adames	August 16, 2020	PRSC
La Romana	Juan José Santana Medrano	September 10, 2012	PLD
La Vega	Andrés Rodríguez Céspedes	September 16, 2012	PLD
María Trinidad Sánchez	Francisco Peña	September 10, 2012	PLD
Monseñor Nouel	Miguel Ángel Genao	September 9, 2012	PLD
Monte Cristi	vacant	April 8, 2025	vacant
Monte Plata	Andrés Concepción	September 2, 2012	PLD
Pedernales	Angel Odalis Zabala Segura	September 9, 2012	PRD
Peravia	Nelly Mercedes Melo	August 2, 2008	PRD
Puerto Plata	Eridania Llibre	August 24, 2008	PLD
Samaná	Enriquillo Lalane	September 5, 2012	PLD
San Cristóbal	Julio César Díaz	September 21, 2012	PRD
San José de Ocoa	Félix Estrella	September 11, 2012	PLD
San Juan	William de Olio	September 7, 2012	PLD
San Pedro de Macorís	Félix de los Santos	September 8, 2012	PRD
Sánchez Ramírez	Teresa Inoa	September 14, 2012	PLD
Santiago	Aura Toribio de Román	August 23, 2012	PLD
Santiago Rodríguez	Miguel Angel Núñez	September 19, 2012	PRD
Santo Domingo	Juan Frías	September 23, 2012	PRSC
Valverde	Domingo Colón	September 9, 2012	PLD
