= National Identity Card (Dominican Republic) =

Dominican national identity card

Dominican identity card (Cédula de identidad y electoral)
- Dominican identity card since 2026
- Type: Identity card
- Issued by: Dominican Republic: Junta Central Electoral (JCE)
- Purpose: Proof of identity
- Valid in: Dominican Republic
- Eligibility: Dominican citizenship
- Expiration: Adults: 18 Years old Minors: 16 Years old
- Cost: Citizens: Free of charge Foreigners: DOP$3,000~6,000
- Website: jce.gob.do/Servicios-y-Requisitos-de-Cedulacion (in Spanish)

The Dominican national identity card (Spanish: Cédula de Identidad y Electoral or cédula) is a national identity card issued to citizens of the Dominican Republic. The polycarbonate card containing the holder's full name, place of birth, date of birth, nationality, sex, civil status, occupation, polling station, and residential address, as well as a photograph that adheres to ISO/IEC 19794-5. The card can also optionally include the holder's blood type. Formerly, it included the holder's race (until 2014).

Each cédula features an 11-digit number that uniquely identifies the holder on a national level. This number is used as a driver's license number as well as a taxpayer identification number. Private companies also use the cédula number to uniquely identify their customers.

The cédula is issued at Central Electoral Board (Spanish: Junta Central Electoral, JCE) offices nationally and at Cedulación en el Exterior offices internationally. They are issued to all Dominican citizens and legal residents in the country.

== History ==
The Dominican cédula was first issued in 1932 as a result of law number 247. All males who were 16 or older were required to hold a cédula and pay an annual renewal tax under threat of imprisonment. This early cédula was only useful for identification purposes and did not allow its holders to participate in elections. Law 390 made the cédula a legal requirement for all adult women with similar punishments for those who did not renew their cédula on time.

Shortly after the Trujillo dictatorship ended, a new document named the "Registro Electoral" was created with the intent of organizing those who were eligible to vote. The Registro Electoral in combination with the paper cédula continued to be used until 1992, when “la cédula azul” replaced it and combined the two into one document.

In 1998, the JCE introduced a new cédula, replacing the blue cédula with an electronically-backed yellow/brown plastic card.

On 15 January 2014, the JCE announced the specifications for a new cédula that would address many of the security concerns raised over the previous card. The new cédula began being issued in April 2014.

On 16 December 2014, the JCE announced all old cédulas would be revoked on 10 January 2015. Although most governmental organizations ceased accepting the old cédula on the JCE's deadline, the Superintendence of Banks instructed banks to continue accepting the old cédula in combination with a driver's license or passport until 30 June 2015 for existing customers.

As of July 2015, no governmental or private institution in the Dominican Republic accepts the old cédula as a valid form of identification.

Design of the Dominican national ID card from 2013 to 2026.

On 12 April 2026, the Central Electoral Board (JCE) is set to begin the nationwide issuance of the new Dominican Identity and Electoral Card (Cédula)

== Types ==
Design of a non-voting cedula.

Citizens are issued with a yellow cédula de identidad y electoral which indicates their polling station on the reverse. Minors, military personnel, police officers, and foreigners are issued a green cédula de identidad which identifies their inability to vote on the reverse ("NO VOTA") in addition to the reason why they are unable to vote.

Changing cédula types (for example, a civilian enlisting in the military or a minor becoming an adult) does not change the holder's cédula number.

== Technical details ==
The Dominican cédula is printed using a Toppan CP-500 printer using thermal transfer printing at 600ppi. The card's static details (such as its design and serial number) are pre-printed onto the card.

The card's front features the national flag as guilloché art and Juan Pablo Duarte's face as microprint reading "República Dominicana." The card's header is made up of alternating rows of "RÉPUBLICA DOMINICANA" and the card's type (either "CÉDULA DE IDENTIDAD Y ELECTORAL" or "CÉDULA DE IDENTIDAD") printed in microtext. The bottom right corner features an image of the island in optically variable color-changing inks and a semi-transparent version of the cardholder's photo. The card's centre features the Dominican Republic's emblem inside a gulloché printed with invisible ink. The card's top right corner features a hologram of the JCE logo and the Santiago Monumento a los Héroes de la Restauración. Finally, microtext of the cardholder's name is printed under the cardholder's signature.

The card's reverse includes a QR code encoding a GUID identifying the cardholder's details in the JCE's database. Next to the QR code, a Codabar encodes the cardholder's cédula number. A vertical Code128 barcode encodes the card's serial number. The card's serial number's first letter also identifies whether the cardholder is able to vote (N for a non-voting person and V for a voting person). A Machine Readable Zone at the bottom of the card encodes the cardholder's cédula number, birthday, sex, card expiration date, nationality, and names.

Although the JCE's printers are equipped to program contactless smart cards, the card does not contain any integrated circuits.

The cédula number is broken up into three pieces: a series number (3 digits), a document number (7 digits), and a Luhn checksum. Series numbers used to represent the municipality where the cardholder was first issued a cédula but recent cédulas are assigned under the 402 series.
