= Judiciary flag =

Flag for a court or judiciary system

A judiciary flag is the flag that is used in many countries as a symbol of the judiciary or judicial power of government. In some countries it may be for exclusive use of the supreme court or may be extensive to all the judiciary system. The adoption of these flags has been a growing trend among countries in an effort to emphasize the judicial independence.

== List of judiciary flags ==
Flag of the Supreme Court of Bangladesh
(1972)

Flag of the Federal Supreme Court of Brazil (May 27, 1958)

Flag of the Supreme Court of Canada
(March 15, 2021)

Flag of the Judiciary of Chile

Flag of the Judiciary of the Dominican Republic
(February 23, 1998)

Flag of the Judiciary of Guatemala

Flag of the Judiciary of Guyana
(February 21, 2025)

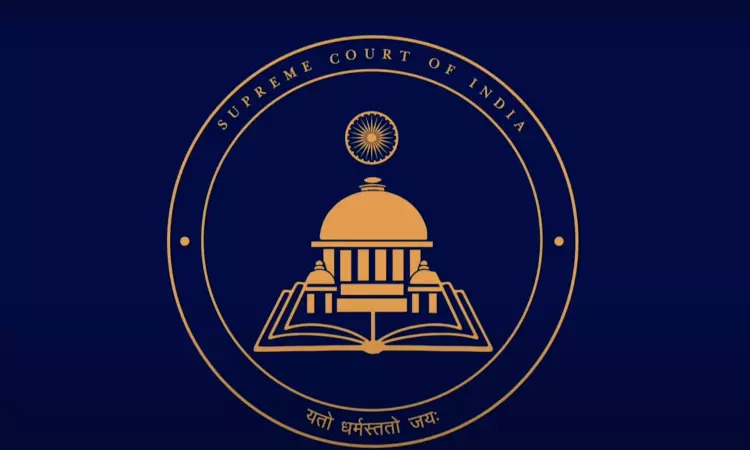
Flag of the Supreme Court of India
(September 1, 2024)

Flag of the Supreme Court of Mexico.

Flag of the Supreme Court of Pakistan (2005)

Flag of the Supreme Court of the Philippines

Flag of the Judiciary of Peru

Flag of the Judiciary of South Africa.

Flag of the Judiciary of South Korea
(August 1978)

Flag of the Supreme Court of the United Kingdom
(October 1, 2009)

Flag of the Supreme Court of the United States
(May 12, 1976)

== See also ==
- Presidential standard
