= National Council of the Magistracy (Dominican Republic) =

The National Council of the Magistracy (Spanish: Consejo Nacional de la Magistratura) is the Dominican constitutional body responsible for appointing judges of the Supreme Court, the Constitutional Court and the Superior Electoral Court of the Dominican Republic.

The NCM is also the organ called to conduct performance evaluations of judges of the Supreme Court.

== History ==
The NCM appears in Dominican Republic for the constitutional amendment of 1994, whose existence is recognized promotion and the late José Francisco Peña Gómez, top leader of the Dominican Revolutionary Party (PRD) as a result of the political crisis of the time.

His skills and integration were altered in the new Dominican constitution of 2010.

== Composition ==
The National Council of the Magistracy is chaired by the President of the Republic.

The rest of its composition is as follows:

- The President of the Senate of the Republic,
- One senator chosen by the Senate belonging to a different party or bloc of parties to the President of the Senate and holding the majority representation of the second;
- The President of the Chamber of Deputies.
- 1 of deputy chosen by the Chamber of Deputies belonging to a different party or bloc of parties to the Speaker of the House of Representatives and holding the majority representation of the second;
- The President of the Supreme Court,
- 1 judge of the Supreme Court, and
- The Attorney General of the Republic.

== Functions ==
With its current characteristics, the Council has assigned the functions belonging to the judiciary system, and the remaining quarter of the chosen legal professionals, academics or members of the Public Ministry.

The National Council of the Magistracy, and designating the judges of the Supreme Court, shall determine which of them will take the chair and appoint a first and second substitute to replace the President in case of absence or disability. The President and his deputies shall exercise these functions for a period of seven years, after which, and after performance evaluation conducted by the National Council of the Magistracy, may be elected for a new period.

In case of vacancy of a judge invested with one of the above stated qualities, the National Council of the Magistracy shall appoint a new judge with equal quality or attribute it to any of the judges of the Supreme Court.

=== Judges of the Supreme Court assessment ===
The judges of the Supreme Court shall be subject to performance evaluation at the end of seven years after his election, by the National Council of the Magistracy. In cases where the NCM decides the relevance of removing a judge from office, it should support their decision on the grounds contained in the law governing the matter.

== Integration ==
=== 1997 call ===
Members of the National Council of the Magistracy (1997)
Name	Position	Party
Leonel Fernández	President of the Republic	PLD
Néstor Contín Aybar	President of the Supreme Court	-
Amadeo Julián	Judge of the Supreme Court	-
Amable Aristy	President of the Senate	PRSC
Milagros Ortiz Bosch	Senator	PRD
Rafael Peguero Méndez	President of the Chamber	PRD
César Féliz Féliz	Deputy	PRSC

=== 2001 Call ===
Members of the National Council of the Magistracy (2001)
Name	Position	Party
Hipólito Mejía	President of the Republic	PRD
Jorge Subero Isa	President of the Supreme Court	-
Víctor José Castellanos Estrella	Judge of the Supreme Court	-
Andrés Bautista	President of the Senate	PRD
José González Espinoza	Senator	PTD
Rafaela Alburquerque	President of the Chamber	PRSC
Alfredo Pacheco	Deputy	PRD

=== 2011 Call ===
Members of the National Council of the Magistracy (2011)
Nome	Position	Party
Leonel Fernández	President of the Republic	PLD
Radhamés Jiménez Peña	Attorney General of the Republic	PLD
Jorge Subero Isa	President of the Supreme Court	PRSC
Víctor José Castellanos Estrella	Judge of the Supreme Court	PLD
Reinaldo Pared Pérez	President of the Senate	PLD
Félix Vásquez	Senator	PRSC
Abel Martínez Durán	President of the Chamber	PLD
Hugo Núñez	Deputy	PRD

=== 2016 Call ===
Members of the National Council of the Magistracy (2016)
Name	Position	Party
Danilo Medina	President of the Republic	PLD
Jean Alain Rodríguez	Attorney General of the Republic	PLD
Mariano Germán Mejía	President of the Supreme Court	PLD
Fran Euclides Soto Sánchez	Judge of the Supreme Court	PLD
Reinaldo Pared Pérez	President of the Senate	PLD
José Ignacio Paliza	Senator	PRM
Lucía Medina	President of the Chamber	PLD
Josefa Castillo	Deputy	PRM
