= Minou Tavárez Mirabal =

Dominican philologist, professor and politician (born 1956)

Minerva Tavárez Mirabal
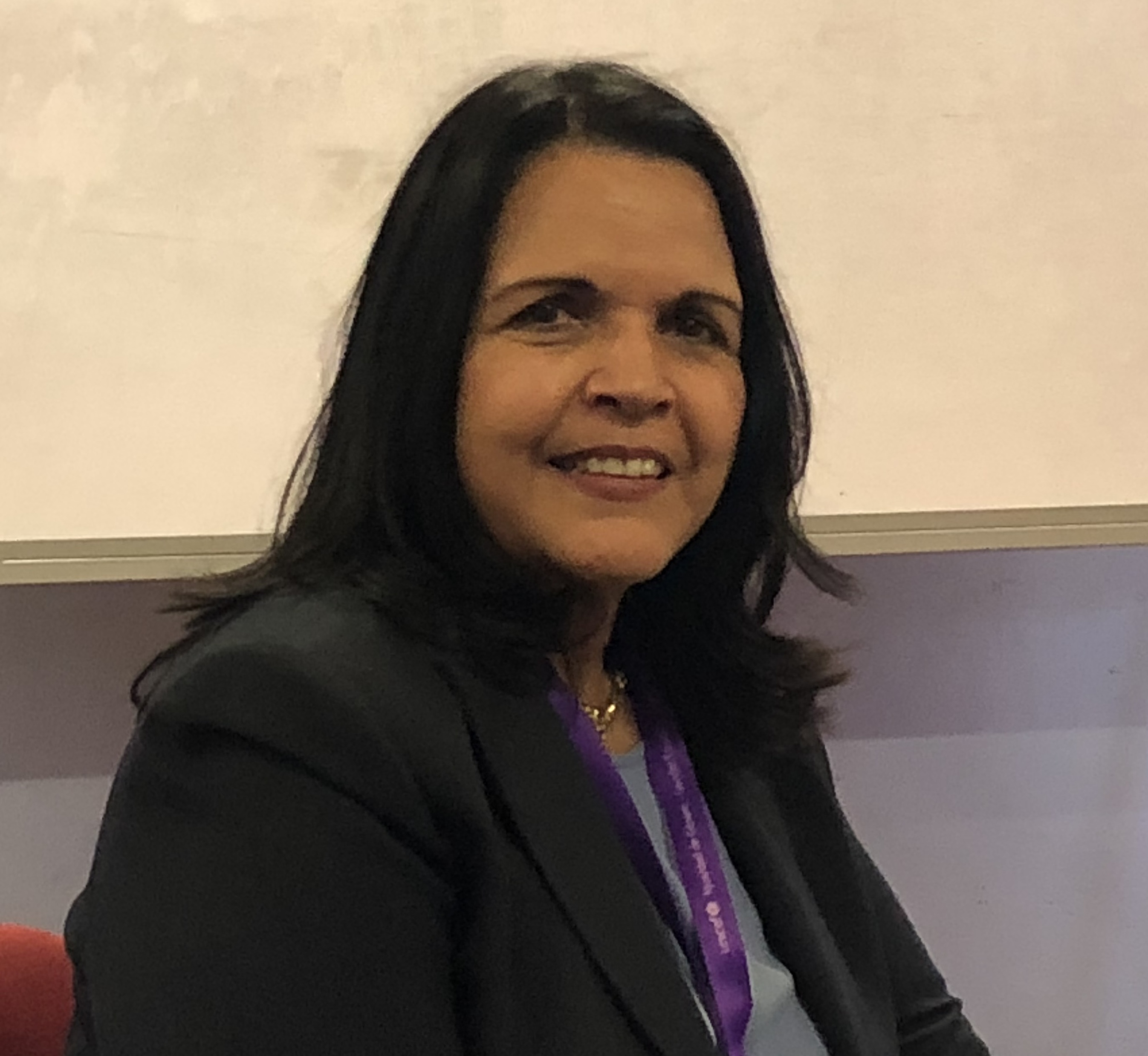
- Tavárez Mirabal in 2018

Representative for National District’s district #1
- In office 16 August 2002 – 16 August 2016 Serving with Alberto Atallah (from 2006 to 2016)

Vice Foreign Minister
- In office 16 August 1996 – 16 August 2000
- President: Leonel Fernández

Board of Directors, Trust Fund Victims ICC
- Incumbent
- Assumed office 1 June 2020
- Preceded by: Felipe Michelini

Personal details
- Born: August 31, 1956 (age 70) Ojo de Agua, Hermanas Mirabal Province, Dominican Republic
- Party: Democratic Choice (2015-present)
- Other political affiliations: Dominican Liberation’s Party (circa 1995–2014)
- Children: Camila Minerva; Manuel Aurelio
- Education: Instituto Universitario de Investigación Ortega y Gasset; University of Havana
- Occupation: Politician; academician
- Profession: Philologist

Minerva Josefina Tavárez Mirabal (born 31 August 1956), known as Minou, is a philologist, professor and politician from the Dominican Republic. Tavárez served as deputy for the National District in the lower House for three terms from 2002 until 2016; she served as deputy minister of foreign affairs from 1996 to 2000.

She was the presidential nominee of both the Alliance for Democracy and Democratic Choice parties for the 2016 Dominican Republic general election.

From 2002 until 2016 she held several directive positions at Parliamentarians for Global Action. She presided the International Council from 2012 until 2014, and until 2016 she was President of the Executive Board.

Since 2019, she is the vice president of the Party Alianza País. She is the co-founder and director of the Memory Museum Mirabal Sisters. She is a member of the Leaders Network of Michelle Bachelet's Foundation Horizonte Ciudadano. In June 2020, Tavarez was elected by the Assembly of States Parties to the International Criminal Court as the Latin American and Caribbean seat holder at the Board of Direction of the Trust Fund for Victims of the crimes under the jurisdiction of the International Criminal Court.

In December 2021, she was re-elected by the Assembly for a second term of 3 years in the GRULAC seat of the Board, and was elected by the Board of Directors as its Chairperson for the period 2021-2024.

== Early life and family ==
Minou is the daughter of Dominican lawyers and activists Manuel Aurelio Tavárez Justo and María Argentina Minerva Mirabal (of the Mirabal Sisters), both founders in 1960 of the clandestine movement 14 June that sought the overthrow of dictator Rafael Trujillo. Her mother and two aunts were assassinated by the dictatorship in 1960, and her father was murdered by the Triumvirate (three-member junta) that overthrew Juan Bosch’s legitimate government in 1963, becoming an orphan at the age of 7 years. Her parents are considered as martyrs and national heroes. She was raised by her aunt Dedé Mirabal, who raised the children of her assassinated sisters. Tavárez is cousin and foster sister of Jaime David Fernández Mirabal, a former vice-president of the Dominican Republic.

== Parliamentary career ==
She was elected Representative to the National Congress for the period 2002-2006, and re-elected in subsequent periods 2006-2010 and 2010-2016. She was President (or Chair) of the Committee on Foreign Affairs and International Cooperation of the House of Representatives, and member of several other committees.

== Government positions ==
She was Vice-Chancellor of the Dominican Republic for the period 1996-2000. In that capacity she coordinated numerous international summits held at the Dominican Republic, including as National Coordinator of the I Summit of Heads of State and Heads of Government of the Caribbean Community in 1998, and General Coordinator of the II Summit of Heads of State and Government of the African, Caribbean and the Pacific Countries in 1999. From 1996 until 1998, she also served as National Coordinator of the Mixed-Bilateral Commission Dominican Republic-Haiti.

Previous to her position as Vice-chancellor, she serves as Coordinator and Rapporteur on Foreign Policy during the National Dialogue held in 1997-1998, and she was the National Coordinator of the Extraordinary Summit of Heads of State and Heads of Government of Central America, held in 1997.

== Opposition party ==
Tavarez was a member of the Central Committee of the Party of Dominican Liberation from 1997 until 2014. In 2015 she founded the Democratic Choice, which she presided since 2015. She was the presidential nominee of both the Alliance for Democracy and Democratic Choice parties for the 2016 Dominican Republic general election. Since 2019, she is the vice president of the Party Alianza País.

== Family tree ==
Ancestors of Minou Tavárez Mirabal

8. Aurelio Tabares Morales
4. Manuel Francisco Tavárez Ramos (1890–1975)
9. Mercedes Ramos (–1841)
2. Manuel Aurelio Tavárez Justo (1931–1963)
10. Rafael Justo
5. Josefina Auristela Justo Rosseau
11. Isabel Rosseau
1. Minerva Josefina Tavárez Mirabal (born 1956)
12. Simeón Mirabal Núñez
6. Enrique Mirabal Fernández (1895–1953)
13. Adela Fernández González
3. María Argentina Minerva Mirabal Reyes (1926–1960)
14. José Miguel Reyes Ovalles
7. Mercedes Reyes Camilo (1898–1981)
15. María de los Ángeles Camilo González
