= Amable Aristy =

Dominican politician and businessman (1949–2022)

The Most Excellent Amable Aristy

President of the Senate of the Dominican Republic
- In office 16 August 1994 – 16 August 1998
- President: Joaquín Balaguer (until 1996); Leonel Fernández (from 1996)
- Preceded by: José Osvaldo Leger Aquino (1993–1994)
- Succeeded by: Ramón Alburquerque Ramírez (1998–2000)

Senator of the Dominican Republic for the Province of La Altagracia
- In office 16 August 1990 – 1999 (resigned)
- Succeeded by: Ramón Sánchez de la Rosa (PRSC)
- In office 10 November 2010 – 16 August 2020
- Preceded by: Germán Castro García (PRSC)
- Succeeded by: Dr. Virgilio Cedano (PRM)
- Majority: Dominican Liberation’s Party

Chairman of the League of Dominican Municipalities
- In office 1999–2010
- Preceded by: Julio Maríñez (PRD)
- Succeeded by: Fidias Aristy (PRSC)

Personal details
- Born: 10 May 1949 El Bonao (Higüey), La Altagracia Province, Dominican Republic
- Died: 4 December 2022 (aged 73) Higüey, La Altagracia Province, Dominican Republic
- Party: Reformist Party, Social Christian Reformist Party
- Spouse: Andrea Cedeño
- Children: Karen Magdalena Aristy, Onavel Andres Aristy, Jenny Aristy, Amable Enrique Aristy
- Parent(s): Luis Aristy, Olivia Castro
- Education: Universidad de la Tercera Edad (Degree in Law)
- Occupation: Politician, businessman
- {{{blank1}}}: US$ 2.5 million RD$ 91.7 million (2010)

Amable Aristy Castro (10 May 1949 – 4 December 2022) was a politician and businessman from the Dominican Republic. He was a senior leader of the Social Christian Reformist Party (PRSC) and was a Senator for the province of La Altagracia. Aristy was the presidential candidate for his party in the 2008 presidential election. Due to the remarkable power and influence that he wielded on his native province, he was known as the "Chieftain of Higüey" ("Spanish: El Cacique de Higüey").

Aristy was elected senator for La Altagracia 7 times in a row: in 1990, 1994, 1998, 2002, 2006, 2010, and 2016. Nevertheless, he was not a senator for all those years as he resigned in the 1998-2002 period and he did not swear in in 2002 and 2006 leaving his senatorship to close friends; while he was chairman of the League of Dominican Municipalities (from 1999 to 2010). In 2010 he was threatened with impeachment and political disqualification if he left his senatorship to a friend again; he left his office in the League to a cousin of his and decided to be sworn in on 10 November 2010, nearly three months after August the 16th, the date marked by the constitution to do so.

Aristy was described as one of the least laborious senators.

Political leader Amable Aristy Castro died on December 4 in Higüey, La Altagracia province, from a cardiac arrest at the age of 73.

According to local sources, he suffered a cardiac arrest at his home, after participating in the inauguration of a shopping mall. He was transferred to the Perozo Clinic, where he was pronounce dead.

Castro was born in the community of El Bonao, Higüey, La Altagracia province, on May 10, 1949. He had been president of the Liberal Reform Party (PRL) since 2015.

He began his political career in the Social Christian Reform Party (PRSC), which he joined in 1976 and for which he was elected twice as a representative and seven times as a senator. He also presented his presidential candidacy for this political party in 2008. He was president of the Senate four times and held the position of general secretary of the Municipal League (LMD) on three occasions.

== Political life ==
Known as “the chief of Higüey”, Aristy Castro had a turbulent political life that began in the 1970s, being elected to public office for the first time in the 1982 elections, occupying a seat in the Chamber of Deputies.

He spent eight years in the Lower House, and from 1990 to 1998 he served as a Senator of the Republic representing the province of La Altagracia.

In 1999, he resigned from the Senate to become general secretary of the Dominican Municipal League (LMD), after an agreement between the PRSC and the Dominican Liberation Party (PLD).

In the 2002 congressional elections, he was again elected as a senator. In that legislative period, he once again assumed the leadership of the LMD, with the support of the Dominican Revolutionary Party (PRD), for which he had to resign from his seat in the Senate again in 2003.

In 2006, he returned to the National Congress as a senator, a post he vacated to return to the LMD, under a support agreement between the PLD and PRD.

Four years later, in 2010, he was elected to the Senate for the PRSC, but two years later he was expelled by the Permanent Presidential Commission of that political party for opposing an alliance with the PLD for the 2012 elections.

After his expulsion from the PRSC, after being one of its main leaders for 36 years, in 2015 he founded the Liberal Reform Party (PRL), a political organization for which he was re-elected senator in an agreement with the PLD to support the re-election of President Danilo Medina.

In November 2019, the PLR continued as an ally of the PLD, with the candidacy of Gonzalo Castillo, but less than a month before the 2020 presidential and congressional elections, it announced its support for Luis Abinader, then presidential candidate for the Modern Revolutionary Party (PRM), while expressing his intention to be re-elected again as a senator.

However, the PRM had its candidate for the Senate for the province of La Altagracia, Virgilio Cedano, who won with 38,403 votes (43.77%) against 25,270 votes (28.80%) achieved by Aristy Castro. Robert de la Cruz, from the PLD, obtained 22,160 votes (25.26%).

Political offices
Preceded by José Osvaldo Leger Aquino	President of the Senate of the Dominican Republic; 1994 – 1998	Succeeded by Ramón Alburquerque Ramírez
Unknown	Senator of the Dominican Republic for the Province of La Altagracia; 1990 – 1999	Succeeded by Ramón Sánchez de la Rosa
Preceded by Julio Maríñez	Secretary General of the Dominican Municipalities League; 1999 – 2010	Succeeded by Fidias Aristy
Vacant Title last held by Germán Castro García	Senator of the Dominican Republic for the Province of La Altagracia; 10 November 2010 – 4 December 2022	Vacant
