= Supreme Court of the Dominican Republic =

Highest court in the Dominican Republic

- Interactive map of Supreme Court of the Dominican Republic
- 18.448°N 69.925°W
- Established: November 6, 1844; 182 years ago
- Jurisdiction: Dominican Republic
- Location: Distrito Nacional, Dominican Republic
- Coordinates: 18.448°N 69.925°W
- Composition method: Elected by the National Council of Magistracy
- Authorised by: Constitution of the Dominican Republic
- Judge term length: 9 years
- Number of positions: 16
- Website: poderjudicial.gob.do (in Spanish)

Chief Justice of the Dominican Republic
- Currently: Justiniano Montero Montero
- Since: November 2026, 10; 3 days' time

The Supreme Court of the Dominican Republic (Spanish: Suprema Corte de Justicia de la República Dominicana, SCJ) is the highest court existing in the Republic and is, therefore, the head of the judiciary in the country.

The Supreme Court is the final court empowered to administer justice, i.e. that its judgments can not be appealed, although they may eventually be reviewed by the same court through the use of re consideration.

It is in the highest place in the Dominican Judicial organization over the Courts of Appeal, Courts of First Instance, Peace Courts and special courts and corresponds super general administrative supervision over all courts of the Republic, except the Superior Electoral Court, and the Constitutional Court. It is headquartered in Santo Domingo, capital of the Republic, in the Palace of the Supreme Court in the center of the heroes, adjacent to the National Congress.

== History ==
=== Colonial times ===
The oldest higher-level court in Dominican history recording is the Royal Audiencia of Santo Domingo, founded in 1511 and composed of a chairman and three Auditors (Judges). Acting as a court of appeal, except in the so-called "Casos de Cortes" in which litigated the Spanish Crown, then constituted in the first instance and then be taken to the Council of the Indies based in Sevilla, with powers of court second grade. Centuries later, in 1776, he was added the post of Regent in order to streamline processes and ensure prompt settlement thereof.

Theoretically the island belongs to France under the Peace of Basel, from 1795 there was created a court of cassation would never know the substance of the cases. This same high court was consecrated by the Haitian Constitution of 1801, which ruled Dominican Republic for a short time. From 1802 and during the Age of France, the Imperial Academy served as a supreme court, with three Spanish and three French judges.

The Constitution of Cadiz again established the Royal Court to hear appeals for annulment of known issues on appeal by a Royal Audience neighbor. In the short-lived government independent of José Núñez de Cáceres, a Superior Court of Justice it was created.

From Haitian rule in 1822 Santo Domingo to have a court of cassation national character instituted by the Haitian Constitution of 1816 to hear appeals submitted to it without avocar the background. From 1826 they began to take effect Haitian codes based on French law, civil, criminal, commercial, civil procedure, criminal instruction. Years after the end of that domination in the country, the Haitian Constitution of 1843, maintained the judicial organization headed by a Court of Cassation, but this constitution was barely known in the Republic by the patriotic coup of February 27, 1844.

=== First Republican Period, 1844–1908 ===
The original Dominican Constitution of 1844 voted in San Cristobal on November 6, 1844, appropriated among other powers of the Supreme Court the power to hear appeals for annulment (appeal) against the judgments given ultimately by the courts of appeal. But he was also attributed by the Organic Judiciary Act of 1845 to hear the merits of the issues last and third instance.

The same Constitution of 1844 gave jurisdiction to the Supreme Court to ensure uniformity of jurisprudence, so that judgments given by the courts and tribunals have acquired the ultimate authority of the judicature could be examined for the purpose of standardizing jurisprudence without this ruling exploited or prejudice to the parties. This provision expressly repeated in all constitutional reforms until 1877.

But the revision of the Constitution in February 1854 abolished the action for annulment and left the Supreme Court as a court of appeal. This situation was maintained all along of the republican life, from 1854 to 1908, when the Supreme Court regained its true function of Court of Cassation. Exceptionally in the reform in Moca in 1858, the Court of Cassation set out to learn about the "breach of formulas or violation of the law," but the counterrevolution led by General Pedro Santana prevented this step forward.

In the period of the Annexation to Spain, 1861–1865, the former Real Audiencia long worked in the colonial era was restored.

With the National Restoration he returned to the same system Court of Appeal as the main function of the Supreme Court.

In the reform of 1877 and until the reform of 1907, over the years was expressly attributed to the Supreme Court the power "to declare what the law, when ever are in collision." Organic Judiciary Act of 1884 provided that the Supreme Court "resolve queries that ask for the lower courts, but not before they make judgments."

In the same year of 1884 definitively were approved and promulgated, translated into Spanish and adapted to our environment, the French codes in civil, commercial, criminal, civil procedure and criminal procedure matters, which since 1845 had ordered his observation throughout the national territory

The number of judges of the Supreme Court has had different amounts over time. In 1844, a chairman and three members. Then at the beginning of the Second Republic, a president and two judges. In the constitution of 1908, seven judges in total. In the Constitution of 1963, nine judges, although by law enacted in 1958 the number rose to 11, but later again reduced to 9. It is currently 16 judges.

Since the reform of 1878 (Article 38) the Supreme Court has the power to take the lead in the formation of laws being referred to judicial affairs. This situation has never been modified since and is currently in force through Article 38 of the 1994 reform.

The reform of 1908 was attributed to primary way to the Supreme Court functions Court of Cassation. To do this the Law of Judicial Organization and Procedure of Cassation on June 2, 1908. Two days later the new Court of Cassation was put into operation was enacted. Three years later a law on appeal, that of 12 April 1911 was voted.

The existence of the death penalty as the capital punishment for defendants who so deserved, led to the full Supreme Court was part of the military commissions under Article 210 of the Constitution of the Republic, were created one in 1847, which ordered the execution of the brothers Jose Joaquin Puello and Gabino, and another in 1848, which was more lenient sentencing to imprisonment in some cases and downloaded to other defendants. Both times were tried for conspiracy to commit crimes against state security.

Given its status as Member of the National Congress Gral. Santiago Perez. accused of the crime of homicide to the detriment of the poet Edward Scanlan, because of the latter committing the alleged crime of adultery with the wife of the defendant, the General was sentenced to the death penalty by the Supreme Court and subsequently executed in 1887.

=== Second Republican Period, 1908–1994 ===
On the occasion of the new powers of the Supreme Court of Justice as Court of Cassation, the Courts of Appeal of Santo Domingo and Santiago de los Caballeros, and soon created after La Vega. Slowly and over time the number of the Parliament was increased to currently reach nine, so that subsequent to the original three successively created the San Cristóbal, San Pedro de Macorís, San Juan de la Maguana, Barahona, San Francisco de Macorís and Monte Cristi.

In 1908 the jurisdiction of the Supreme Court was devoted to "decide in the last resort on the constitutionality of laws, decrees and regulations in all cases that are the subject of legal dispute between parties". The constitutional, but only on laws, it was established in the constitution of 1874, and continued in 1875, but then disappeared in the following reforms. For those days this resource was admitted "as a particular decision, reasonable judgment that redeems the share of responsibility or damage that may befall".

The reform of 1924 extended the constitutional motion and this happens to have the character "concentrate", to be granted by Article 61, paragraph 5: the power to "decide on first and last word on the constitutionality of laws, decrees, resolutions and prejudicial to individual rights enshrined in this Constitution".

But such a formula was eliminated in the next reform of 1927, in order to restore the "fuzzy control", established in 1908, for which first had to be legal dispute and therefore be able to admit the constitutional challenge and not as in 1924 which stated that the appeal was open even in the absence of litigation. From 1927 to 1994 this system of "fuzzy control" remained, is a resource by way of exception.

The reform of 1908 abolished the death penalty because of political crimes. The following 1924 the principle of the inviolability of life was consecrated and discarded forever the death penalty, which was replaced by the penalty of public works by Law No. 64 of 1924 and this in turn was suppressed to make it imprisonment by Law No. 224 of 1984.

The executive presidential vocation of the Supreme Court of Justice has been enshrined in various substantive occasions. In 1878 it was on an interim basis Lic. Jacinto de Castro, President of the Supreme Court. In 1970 to ensure an electoral process it was the owner Mr. Manuel Ramon Ruiz Tejada and in the period 1982 -. 1986 absence of the President and Vice President have died, it was sometimes temporarily Dr. Manuel Berges Chupani.

The Supreme maintained without any interruption the Judicial Gazette founded on August 31, 1910, and appears monthly until today.

During this period numerous amendments to the Civil, Criminal, Commercial, Civil Procedure and Criminal Procedure were made, and new legislation on banking, individual security (bail, habeas corpus, forgiveness conditional instituted the penalty, prison system), work (accidents and loans), social security (retirement, pension, hospital care).

The No. 25-91 Organic Law of the Supreme Court was adopted dividing it the Supreme Court into two chambers: a Civil, Commercial and Labor and a second chamber for Criminal, Administrative and Constitutional, by Article 25 the capacity of President of the Supreme Court devoted to be taken directly on complaint, setting hearing misdemeanor and appointing an examining magistrate for the purpose of investigating criminal case place.

=== Third Republican Period, 1994–1998 ===
The constitutional reform of 1994 is crucial in the institutional life of the Judiciary, to devote himself by Article 63 administrative and budgetary autonomy of this organ of the state, plus the appointment of the Supreme Court by the National Council of Magistracy, chaired by the President of the Republic, or its absence by the Vice President or, failing both by the Attorney General of the Republic and also composed of the President of the Senate and chosen by the Senate who belongs to a different party than President of the Senate; by the President of the Chamber of Deputies and a deputy also chosen by the House that belongs to a different party than the President of the establishment; the President of the Supreme Court and a Judge of the Supreme Court of Justice chosen by her, who will act as Secretary.

When the Supreme Court is designated, it belong to their judges choose the Judges of the Court of Appeal, the Land Court, the Courts of First Instance, the judges, Judges of Tax Litigation and other judges of any other judicial courts created by law and administrative positions necessary for the judiciary to comply fully with its powers and finally all officials and employees who depend on the judiciary, which like all wages and salaries train all judicial and administrative staff.

From 1844 until the 1994 reform, the appointment of all judges of the Judiciary were in charge originally by the Conservative Council and then by the Senate, within the legislative bicameral system or by the consultant Senate, the Legislature or National Congress in the years reigned unicameral system. By Law No. 156-97 the number of judges of the Supreme Court was raised to 16 (sixteen), a President and three cameras identified as First (Civil), Second (Criminal) and Third (Land, Labor, Administrative and Tax Litigation).

The same reform of 1994 restored the "concentrated control" of constitutionality is a function of the Supreme Court, in laws and at the request of the Executive Branch that resource, one of the Presidents of the Chambers or an interested party. This resource ormes erga not close the traditional way of constitutional motion by way of exception, "fuzzy control".

According to the above-mentioned article 63 of the Constitution of 1994 the law would regulate the judicial career and pension scheme of the judges, officials and employees of the court order. Moreover, appropriated judicial functions that are incompatible with other public office or employment except teaching and honorary positions; and it also stated that judges are irremovable, except suspension or dismissal by the Supreme Court, in the manner prescribed by law.

== Composition ==
=== Membership ===
Law 25-91 established that the number of members of the court would be 11 judges, but later the law that sets the number 156–97 in 16 judges, including the Chief Justice was enacted. When the Supreme Court to meet in full the minimum quorum shall be 12 judges. The current number is 17 according to Law 242–11, which establishes a judge without judicial but administrative functions, fixed in the Council of the Judiciary, which is the governing body of the Supreme Court.

=== Election and appointment ===
Judges of the Supreme Court are elected by a special body called the National Council of the Judiciary, with the election of judges of the court its sole attribution. The Council makes nominations for judges of the supreme court. Then call the candidates in order to evaluate the aspects it considers appropriate. Candidacies debugged, we proceed to the election and will be sworn favored by the council and called to this end. In case of death, disability or retirement of a judge of the Supreme Court, the National Judicial Council may meet following the procedures set by the law.

=== Requirements ===
The requirements to be a judge of the Supreme Court are:

- Be Dominican by birth or origin and have more than thirty-five years old;
- Be in full enjoyment of civil and political rights;
- Be degree or a doctorate in law;
- Have exercised for at least twelve years as a lawyer, university teaching of law or have performed, during that time, the functions of judge within the judiciary or the Public Prosecutor. These periods may accumulate.

=== Composition ===
Order	Name	Appointed by	Entry	University
President Judge	Mariano Germán Mejía	National Council of Magistracy	December 22, 2011	UASD
Judge	Julio César Castaños Guzmán	National Council of Magistracy	December 22, 2011	PUCMM
Judge	Jose Alberto Cruceta Almanzar	National Council of Magistracy	December 22, 2011	PUCMM
Judge	Martha Olga García Santamaría*	National Council of Magistracy	December 22, 2011	UASD
Judge	Víctor Joaquín Castellanos Estrella	National Council of Magistracy	December 22, 2011	PUCMM
Judge	Francisco Antonio Jerez Mena	National Council of Magistracy	December 22, 2011	UCE
Judge	Miriam Concepción Germán Brito	National Council of Magistracy	December 22, 2011	PUCMM
Judge	Esther Elisa Agelán Casasnovas	National Council of Magistracy	December 22, 2011	UCE
Judge	Juan Hirohito Reyes Cruz	National Council of Magistracy	December 22, 2011	PUCMM
Judge	Fran Euclides Soto Sánchez	National Council of Magistracy	December 22, 2011	UASD
Judge	Alejandro Moscoso Segarra	National Council of Magistracy	December 22, 2011	UASD
Judge	Manuel Ramón Herrera Carbuccia	National Council of Magistracy	December 22, 2011	PUCMM
Judge	Sara Henríquez Marín	National Council of Magistracy	December 22, 2011	PUCMM
Judge	Robert Placencia Álvarez	National Council of Magistracy	December 22, 2011	UTESA
Judge	Edgar Hernández Mejía	National Council of Magistracy	December 22, 2011	UASD
Judge	Francisco Antonio Ortega Polanco	National Council of Magistracy	August 3, 2012	UNPHU

*the Judge Martha O. Garcia must be retired in 2015*

== Functioning ==
=== Chambers division ===
The Supreme Court is divided into three chambers that will be identified as First Chamber, Second Chamber and the Third Chamber of the Supreme Court. Each chamber shall be composed of five judges, appointed by the full Supreme Court, on a proposal from the latter.

When choosing judges of each chamber, the full Supreme Court, on a proposal from its chairman, shall determine which of them will hold the Presidency of it. In case of absence or disability of the President of a Chamber, perform these functions the judge, a member of the same, the older one, will preside the chamber. However, the President of the Supreme Court, when it deems appropriate, will preside over any such Cameras

Each Chamber may be integrated with three members, and in this case, the decisions must be adopted unanimously. However, when an appeal is known only to three judges may be missed by all the judges members of either chamber, provided that the President of the same issue an Auto, whereby call these judges to join the deliberation and judgment in the case in question. In this case, the decision shall be taken by majority vote.

- The First Chamber shall have jurisdiction to hear and determine appeals that are filed for the first time in Civil and Commercial Matters.
- The Second Chamber shall have jurisdiction to hear and determine appeals in criminal matters, attributed to the Supreme Court, provided they are not of those who know the latter as privileged jurisdiction. Also, the Second Chamber has jurisdiction to hear and determine appeals that are filed for the first time in criminal matters.
- The Third Chamber shall have jurisdiction to hear and determine appeals that are filed for the first time, on land, labor, administrative litigation and tax litigation.
