= Central Electoral Board =

Electoral commission of the Dominican Republic

- Junta Central Electoral (Spanish); JCE
- Logo of the JCE

- Institutional flag

Agency overview
- Formed: April 12, 1923; 103 years ago
- Jurisdiction: Dominican Republic and its offices abroad
- Headquarters: Avenida 27 de Febrero esquina Avenida Luperón, Santo Domingo Oeste, Santo Domingo Province, 11113, Dominican Republic
- Motto: Garantía de Identidad y Democracia ("Guarantee of Identity and Democracy")
- Annual budget: RD$10,870,891,737.00 billion (FY 2026)
- Agency executive: Román Andrés Jáquez Liranzo, President
- Key document: Law No. 20-23 (in Spanish)
- Website: jce.gob.do (in Spanish)

The Central Electoral Board (Spanish: Junta Central Electoral, JCE) of the Dominican Republic is a special body of the government of the Dominican Republic responsible for ensuring a democratic and impartial electoral process, and also administer the civil registry, the marital status of all Dominican citizens. It was created in the year 1923 as part of the negotiations to end the first US intervention, and currently its functions are to organize the presidential, congress and of overseas deputies held on the third Sunday of May of each leap year, and municipal elections held on the third Sunday of February of each leap year.

== History ==
Although there is not much historical material about the Central Electoral Board, it is known that it was created on April 12, 1923, through Law No. 3413, and was incorporated into the Dominican Constitution with article 82 of the 1924 reform. It is currently regulated by article 212 of the 2015 Constitution. It is responsible for organizing the elections of the President of the Republic, senators, Deputies, municipal mayors, the directors of the Municipal Boards and the councilors.

It is also responsible for registering, saving and managing the data of all Dominicans since birth, granting various documents to prove the identification of nationals and citizens. Some of these documents are:

- The birth certificate, with which the father and mother testify to the birth of a child, and in which they also choose their name.
- The ID is an identity document and electoral obtained at the age of 18, and that gives a unique number to each Dominican citizen for identification. There is a minor ID for those nationals who have reached 16 years, this is obtained for university, work and other minor purposes, since until obtaining the official ID can not vote in any election.

== Members (2020–2024) ==
- Román Andrés Jáquez Liranzo, President.
- Rafael Armando Vallejo Santelises, full member.
- Dolores Altagracia Fernández Sánchez, full member.
- Patricia Lorenzo Paniagua, Full Member.
- Samir Rafael Chami Isa, Full Member.

== Past Memberships ==
=== (2010–2016) ===
- Roberto Rosario Márquez, President.
- José Ángel Aquino Rodríguez, full member.
- Rosario Altagracia Graciano de los Santos, full member.
- Eddy de Jesús Olivares Ortega, full member.
- César Francisco Féliz Féliz, Full Member.

=== (2016–2020) ===
- Julio César Castaños Guzmán, President.
- Roberto Saladín Selin, full member.
- Rosario Altagracia Graciano de los Santos, full member.
- Carmen Imbert Brugal, Full Member.
- Henry Mejía Oviedo, Full Member.
