= Hatuey de Camps =

Dominican politician (1947–2016)

President of the Chamber of Deputies of the Dominican Republic
- In office 16 August 1979 – 16 August 1982

Secretary of State (today "Ministro de la Presidencia de la República Dominicana")
- In office 16 August 1982 – 16 August 1986
- President: Salvador Jorge Blanco

Revolutionary Social Democratic Party candidate for President of the Dominican Republic, 2012
- Preceded by: Eduardo Estrella
- Succeeded by: himself

Revolutionary Social Democratic Party candidate for President of the Dominican Republic, 2016
- Preceded by: himself

Personal details
- Born: Hatuey de Camps Jiménez; 29 June 1947 Cotuí, Dominican Republic
- Died: 26 August 2016 (aged 69) Santo Domingo, Dominican Republic
- Party: Revolutionary Social Democratic Party
- Other political affiliations: Dominican Revolutionary Party
- Spouse(s): Cecilia García Castillo (div.); Milagros Germán (div.); Dominique Bluhdorn
- Relations: Miguel Ángel de Camps (father); Charles Bluhdorn (father-in-law)
- Children: 10
- Education: Complutense University of Madrid
- Occupation: Politician; businessman

Hatuey de Camps Jiménez (29 June 1947 – 26 August 2016) was a politician from the Dominican Republic. He served as president of the Lower House of the Congress of the Dominican Republic from 1979 to 1982, and Secretary of State (today Minister of the Presidency) of the Dominican Republic from 1982 to 1986.

== Biography ==
He was born on 29 June 1947, in Cotuí (then in the province of La Vega, at present in the province of Sánchez Ramírez). His father was Miguel Ángel de Camps Cortes, a Dominican politician of Catalan descent, deputy consul-general in Hamburg and ambassador to Nicaragua, landowner, violinist and founding member of the National Symphonic Orchestra. His mother was Orfelina Jiménez Jerez, a teacher.

His first born son is Raul de Camps Narpier, whom he had with the journalist and TV Producer Irene Narpier. In the late seventies he married Dominican actress and singer Cecilia García, with whom had two sons: Hatuey and Luis Miguel de Camps García, afterwards divorced. Then he married television presenter, TV producer and former Miss Dominican Republic 1980 Milagros Germán, with whom he had three children: Milagros Marina, Álvaro Hatuey, and Andreas Salomé de Camps Germán. Germán and De Camps divorced in 1990.

He married for a third time, with the American heiress Dominique Blühdorn, daughter of the Frenchwoman Yvette M. LeMarrec (a native of Paris) and the Austrian investor Karl G. Blühdorn (a native of Vienna), founder of the extinct Gulf and Western, and developer in Dominican Republic of Casa de Campo and Heights of Chavón. With Blühdorn he has fathered four children, three of them triplets: Gabriela Yvette, Charles, Alexandra and Olivia.

De Camps has ten children in total from his three marriages.

He earned a Doctor in Philosophy and Letters from the Universidad Complutense of Madrid in Spain and graduated in economic planning and development, in the Institute for the Development of the Area Iberoamericana (ISDIBER).

=== Politics ===
With the arrival of the Dominican Revolutionary Party (PRD) to the Dominican Republic, he began his political activity. He was one of the most emblematic figures of the PRD.

In April 1965, he founded the Student Revolutionary Front Nationalist (FREN). He matriculated into the Autonomous University of Santo Domingo, enrolled in 1965-66, and there he combined his studies in philosophy with the student fight for a university budget of half a million pesos per month. He became the president of the Federation of Dominican Students, and as president, he pronounced the eulogy at the funeral of the leader and student mate Amín Abel Hasbún murdered during the Twelve Years of Joaquín Balaguer.

Deputy to the National Congress in 1978, he occupied the offices of General Director of Radio-Televisión Dominicana by month and a half in an honorific manner. In 1979 he was elected president (speaker) of the Chamber of Deputies, position that he held until 1982. During his tenure he created the law that forced civil servants to make a sworn statement of goods.

In 1982, he became secretary (minister) of the presidency in the government of the Dr. Salvador Jorge Blanco. He was the organiser of the funeral of Dr. José Francisco Peña Gómez.

=== Departure from the Dominican Revolutionary Party ===
Afterwards of intense contradictions with the then president of the Republic and copartisan Hipólito Mejía, because of De Camps's posture of no reelection, Hatuey in the 2003–2004 called the population to vote for the Devil before Hipólito. This caused more grudges between them.

He was secretary general of the Dominican Revolutionary Party and chairman of the party until 2004. He quit from the PRD since the high leadership, had moved away of the ideals of his historical leader Dr. Peña Gómez. Because of this De Camps established the Revolutionary Social Democratic Party.

== He promoted as deputy ==
- Creation, of the INFOTEP.
- Creation of the provinces of Monte Plata and Monseñor Nouel.

== Presidential candidacy in 2016 ==
De Camps participated in the general elections of 2016 heading the presidential ballot of his Revolutionary Social Democratic Party. Furthermore, he participated in the first presidential debate in the history of the Dominican Republic. He was the only opposition presidential candidate that congratulated Danilo Medina for his victory in the election.

== Health and death ==
In May 2006, it was detected on De Camps an intestinal occlusion attributed to a diverticulitis, reason by which he required an urgent surgery in the Columbia Presbyterian Medical Center of New York. The following month, De Camps revealed that it was excised a cancerous tumor in his colon.

In late 2015 his state of health worsened and De Camps presented a scrawny look. On 25 May 2016, after the general elections, the rumour spread that De Camps had died, a version that was debunked; De Camps was in his residence ailed by a flu. The following day he was confined in a medical clinic as his condition had involved into pneumonia; the next few days he was discharged.

De Camps died at his home in Santo Domingo on 26 August 2016 at the age of 69 from cancer.

Political offices
Preceded by Abraham Bautista Alcántara	President of the Chamber of Deputies of the Dominican Republic; 16 August 1979 – 16 August 1982	Succeeded by Hugo Tolentino Dipp
Government offices
Preceded by missing data	Administrative Minister of the Presidency of the Dominican Republic; 1982 – 1986	Succeeded by missing data
Party political offices
Preceded by Emmanuel Esquea Guerrero	President of the Dominican Revolutionary Party; 1998 – January 2004	Succeeded by Vicente Sánchez Baret
New political party	President of the Revolutionary Social Democratic Party; 2005 – 2016	Succeeded by Luis Felipe Cartagena
