= President of the Chamber of Deputies =

President of the Chamber of Deputies may refer to:

- List of presidents of the Argentine Chamber of Deputies
- List of presidents of the Chamber of Deputies of Bolivia
- President of the Chamber of Deputies (Brazil)
- President of the Chamber of Deputies of Chile
- President of the Chamber of Deputies (Czech Republic)
- President of the Chamber of Deputies of the Dominican Republic
- President of the Chamber of Deputies (Italy)
- List of presidents of the Chamber of Deputies of Luxembourg
- President of the Chamber of Deputies Directive Board, Mexico
- President of the Chamber of Deputies of Romania
- List of presidents of the Chamber of Deputies of Rwanda
- President of the Chamber of Deputies of Tunisia
- List of presidents of the Chamber of Deputies of Uruguay

== See also ==
- Chamber of Deputies
- Category:Chairs of lower houses
