= Hugo Tolentino Dipp =

Dominican Republic writer and politician (1930–2019)

National Deputy
- In office 16 August 2010 – 16 August 2016

Secretary of State of Foreign Affairs
- In office 16 August 2000 – 25 March 2003
- Preceded by: Eduardo Latorre Rodríguez
- Succeeded by: Frank Guerrero Prats

President of the Chamber of Deputies
- In office 16 August 1982 – 16 August 1986
- Preceded by: Hatuey de Camps
- Succeeded by: Fernando Amiama Tió

Deputy for the National District
- In office 16 August 1982 – 16 August 1990

Personal details
- Born: 28 August 1930 Santo Domingo, Dominican Republic
- Died: 15 July 2019 (aged 88)
- Party: Modern Revolutionary Party
- Other political affiliations: Dominican Revolutionary Party
- Education: Universidad Autónoma de Santo Domingo; Universidad Central de Madrid; Université de Paris
- Occupation: Politician; educator; writer

Hugo Tolentino Dipp (28 August 1930 – 15 July 2019) was a Dominican historian, politician, lawyer, educator, former Minister of Foreign Relations and President of the Chamber of Deputies of the Dominican Republic from 1982 to 1986.

== Early life ==
Born on 28 August 1930, the day on which General Rafael Trujillo was sworn in as President of the Dominican Republic, within an upper-class family of mulatto background; his father, Vicente Tolentino Rojas, an intellectual and politician, who was minister and a friend of the recently ousted President Horacio Vásquez, had his residence in the National Palace; his mother, Catar 'Caterina' Dipp Attie, was a Lebanese-born socialité. He did his secondary studies at the High School Eugenio María de Hostos in 1948, later he graduated as Juris Doctor at the University of Santo Domingo in 1953; in addition to another title of Juris Doctor from the Central University of Madrid in 1954 and specializing in Public Law at the University of Paris in 1959 during his exile in Europe.

== Career ==
In 1960 he started as an assistant professor of "History of the West Indies during the nineteenth century" for the University of London, on his return in 1963 to the Dominican Republic was appointed professor at the Universidad Autónoma de Santo Domingo after getting through competition the chair of international law.

From that time he was an important pillar in the academic and administrative reform of that institution, in 1966 he was a member of the Committee on University Reform, in 1968 he was elected Academic Vice President, from 1970 to 1974 he was Professor of Sociology and Dominican Social History, and from 1974–1976 was rector thereof.

He married Evangelista Ligia Bonetti Guerra, sister of businessman José Miguel Bonetti Guerra, with whom he fathered his only begotten Beatriz Micaela, thereafter they divorced. He remarried to Sarah Bermúdez.

== Death ==
Dipp died on 15 July 2019, at the age of 88.

== Literary works ==
- PhD thesis (University of Paris): "Orígenes Histórico-Jurídico de los Estados Dominicano y Haitiano"(1959)
- El Fenómero Racial en Haití y la República Dominicana (1973)
- Significado Histórico de la Fundación de la Ciudad de Santo Domingo de Guzmán
- El Colegio Universitario y el Logro de una Educación Integral en la Universidad Autónoma de Santo Domingo
- Discursos desde la Rectoría
- Perfil Nacionalista de Gregorio Luperón
- La Traición de Pedro Santana
- Papel de la Universidad en la Sociedad Latinoaméricana Contemporánea
- Orígenes del Prejuicio Racial contra el Indio en América
- Raza e Historia en Santo Domingo
- Gregorio Luperón: Biografía Política
- La Reelección de Balaguer: Una Polémica (1977)
- Pasado Presente y Futuro de Nuestra Constitución
- El Congreso, las Leyes y la Participación Ciudadana
- Les Orígenes du Prejugé Racial en Amérique Latíne (1984)
- Historia de la Separación de Poderes en la República Dominicana (1985)
- La Influencia de la Revolución Francesa en la República Dominicana (1989)
- Los Mitos del Quinto Centenario (1992)
- Vocablos (1997)
- Itinerario Histórico de la Gastronomía Dominicana (2007)
- Palabra Nueva (2009)

== Awards and honours ==
- Gran Cruz de la Orden del Libertador San Martín, Argentina
- Comandante de la Orden de la Legión de Honor, Francia
- Gran Cruz Placa de la Orden del Mérito de Duarte, Sánchez y Mella, República Dominicana
- Gran Cruz Placa de Plata de la Orden Heráldica de Cristóbal Colón, República Dominicana
- Gran Cruz de la Orden del Mérito Civil, España
- Orden del Mérito al Servicio Diplomático
- Medalla Geum-gwan (Oro) de la Order of Cultural Merit, República de Corea (Sur)
- Gran Cordón de la Order of Brilliant Star, República de China (Taiwán)
- Gran Cruz Placa de Plata de la Orden Nacional José Matías Delgado, El Salvador
- Gran Cruz Placa de Plata de la Orden Nacional Juan Mora Fernández, Costa Rica
- Gran Oficial de la Order of Ouissam Alaouite, Marruecos
- Gran Cruz de la Orden Nacional al Mérito, Ecuador
- Gran Cruz de la Orden del Príncipe Yaroslav el Sabio, Ucrania
- Gran Cruz de la Orden Nacional Honorato Vásquez, Ecuador
- Gran Cruz de la Orden del Quetzal, Guatemala
- Primera Clase (Gran Cruz) de la Orden Francisco de Miranda, Venezuela
