= Rafaela Alburquerque =

Dominican politician

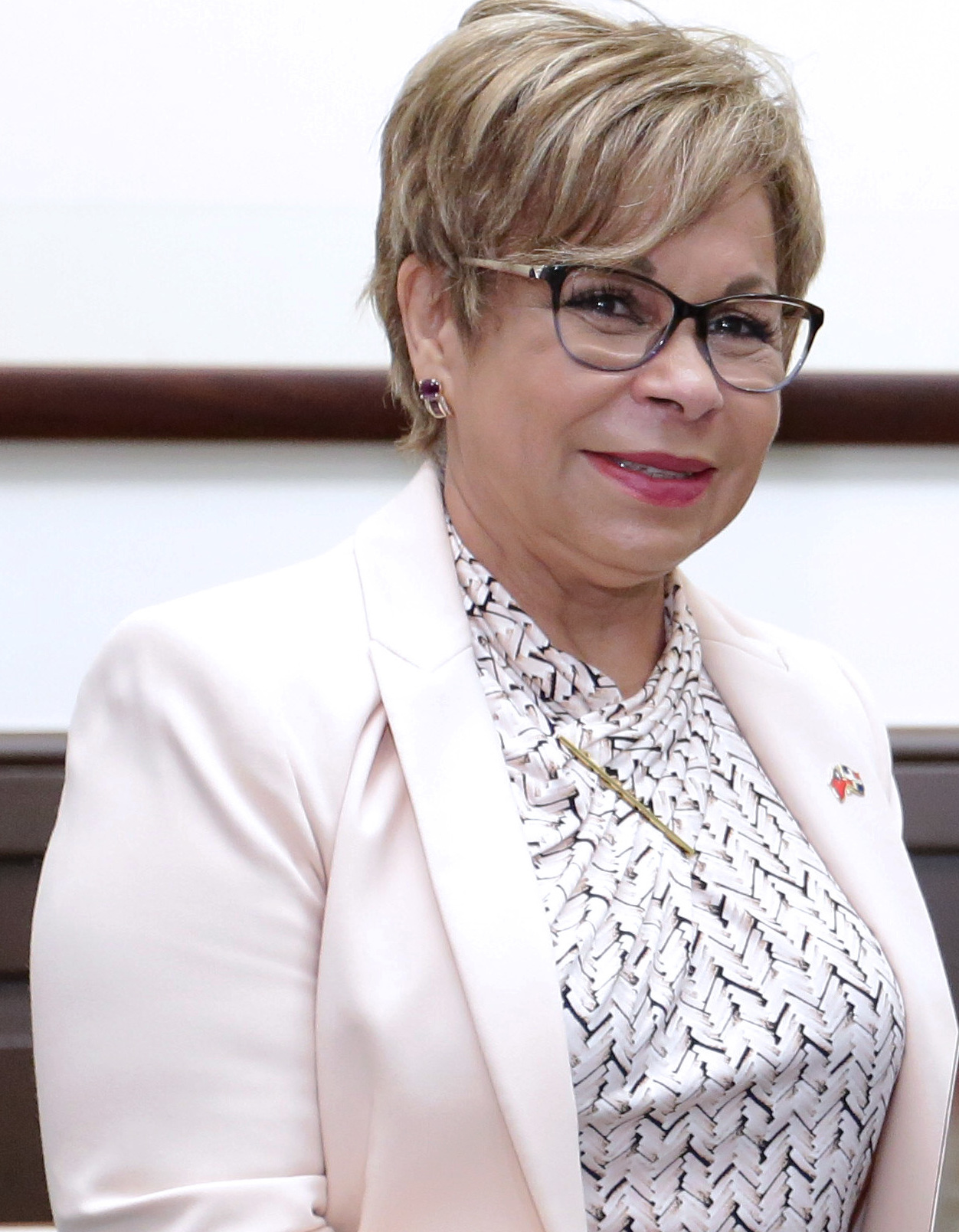

President of the Chamber of Deputies of the Dominican Republic
- In office 1999–2003
- Constituency: San Pedro de Macorís

Ambassador of the Dominican Republic to Taiwan
- In office May 2011 – April 2017

Deputy for the province of San Pedro de Macorís
- Incumbent
- Assumed office 1986

Minister without Portfolio
- In office February 2011 – May 2011

Personal details
- Born: September 19, 1947 (age 78) San José de los Llanos, San Pedro de Macorís, Dominican Republic
- Party: Social Christian Reformist Party (PRSC)
- Education: Universidad Central del Este
- Occupation: Lawyer, diplomat, politician

Rafaela Alburquerque "Lili" de González (born 19 September 1947) is a Dominican lawyer, diplomat, and politician who made history as the first female President of the Chamber of Deputies of the Dominican Republic, serving from 1999 to 2003. As part of the Social Christian Reformist Party (PRSC), she was initially elected as a deputy for San Pedro de Macorís in 1986, becoming the first woman to represent the party in that role. Throughout her career, she has held several significant diplomatic posts, including serving as the Dominican Republic's Ambassador to Taiwan (2011–2017) and as a Consul General in Germany and Belgium. She also faced criticism for simultaneously holding dual public offices and drawing multiple state salaries.

== Early life and education ==
She was born on 19 September 1947 in San José de los Llanos, San Pedro de Macorís, to Claudio Manuel Alburquerque Frías and Isabel Castro. She also earned a doctorate in law from the Universidad Central del Este in 1985.

== Career ==
In 1986, she became the first woman elected to the National Assembly as a deputy for the Social Christian Reformist Party (PRSC), representing San Pedro de Macorís. She had been the Consul General of the Dominican Republic in Antwerp, Belgium (1997-1998) and Hamburg, Germany (1994-1997). She became the first female President of the Chamber of Deputies of the Dominican Republic from 1999 to 2003. She also served as Minister without Portfolio between February and May 2011. Since 15 August 2016, she has been a deputy for the province of San Pedro de Macorís for Social Christian Reformist Party . From May 2011 to April 2017, she served as Ambassador of the Dominican Republic to the Chinese Republic of Taiwan

== Critic of her tenure ==
She was criticized for her dual public roles for 8 months, which led her to earn two salaries from the State.
