= Dominicans for Change =

Dominicans for Change Partido Dominicanos por el Cambio
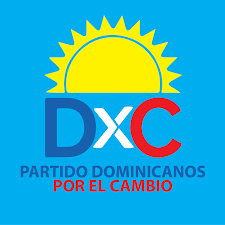
- President: Manuel Oviedo Estrada
- General Secretary: Gilberto Valdez
- Presidium: Mateo Espaillat
- Founder: Eduardo Estrella
- Leader: Eduardo Estrella
- Founded: January 17, 2010
- Ideology: Conservatism; Nationalism; Christian democracy
- Political position: Right-wing
- Colours: Blue
- Chamber of Deputies: 2 / 190
- Senate: 1 / 32
- Mayors: 0 / 155
- Central American Parliament: 0 / 20

Website
- partidodxc.org

Dominicans for Change (Spanish: Partido Dominicanos por el Cambio) is a right-wing political party in the Dominican Republic. Founded in 2010, it is defined in its statutes as conservative, democratic and nationalist, and as protecting the social, cultural, institutional and ecological heritage of the Dominican Republic.

== History ==
The party was established in January 2010 by Eduardo Estrella after he resigned from the Social Christian Reformist Party. It was recognised as a political party by the Central Electoral Board the same month. In the May 2010 parliamentary elections it received 0.48% of the vote, failing to win a seat. The party nominated Eduardo Estrella in the 2012 presidential election. Estrella finished fourth with 0.21% of the vote. It increased its vote share to 0.89% in the 2016 parliamentary elections, but remained seatless.

In the 2020 general elections the party won one seat in the Senate and two in the Chamber of Deputies.
