= President of the Chamber of Deputies of the Dominican Republic =

- Incumbent; Radhamés Camacho since August 16, 2018
- Congress of the Dominican Republic; Chamber of Deputies (Dominican Republic)
- Style: Mr./Mrs. President (Informal and within the Chamber); The Honorable (Formal)
- Type: Presiding officer of one chamber in a bicameral legislature
- Residence: Distrito Nacional
- Seat: Distrito Nacional, Dominican Republic
- Nominator: Anyone who is qualified to be a deputy; in practice member of the Chamber and party leadership.
- Appointer: Chamber of Deputies; Elected by the Chamber, sworn in by the eldest deputy
- Term length: At the Chamber's pleasure; elected at the start of each session, and upon a vacancy
- Constituting instrument: Dominican Constitution
- Formation: November 6, 1844
- First holder: Manuel María Valencia, 1844
- Deputy: The President can delegate to the Chamber's Vice President
- Website: Presidencia

The president of the Chamber of Deputies is the presiding officer of the Chamber of Deputies. The president is simultaneously the chamber's presiding officer, but not the leader of the body's majority party, and the institution's administrative head. Presidents also perform various other administrative and procedural functions, and represent their electoral district. Given these several roles and responsibilities, the president of the chamber usually does not personally preside over debates. That duty is instead delegated to members of the House from the majority party. The president does not regularly participate in floor debates or vote.

The president of the chamber is the vice president of the Dominican Republic National Assemble.

The office of President of the Chamber was established in 1844, although the name is not officially mentioned in the first Dominican constitution. Manuel Maria Valencia served as president of the Congress of Deputies who drafted the constitution. The current president of the chamber is Radhamés Camacho, deputy at-large. He was elected to the office on August 16, 2018.

== See also ==
- List of presidents of the Chamber of Deputies of the Dominican Republic
