= Liberal Reformist Party (Dominican Republic) =

Minor liberal party in the Dominican Republic

Liberal Reformist Party Partido Reformista Liberal
- Abbreviation: PRL
- Founded: 1980s
- Ideology: Liberalism
- Political position: Centre
- Chamber of Deputies: 1 / 190

The Liberal Reformist Party (Spanish: Partido Reformista Liberal or PRL), formerly the Liberal Party of the Dominican Republic (Spanish: Partido Liberal de la República Dominicana or PLRD) is a liberal political party in the Dominican Republic. The party was originally named La Estructura, the name under which it contested the 1986 general elections as part of an alliance with the defeated Dominican Revolutionary Party. For the 1990 elections it changed its allegiance to the victorious Social Christian Reformist Party. For the 2006 elections it was part of the victorious Progressive Bloc.
