= Dharuelly D'Aza =

Dominican medical doctor and politician

Vice President of the Chamber of Deputies of the Dominican Republic
- Incumbent
- Assumed office 16 August 2024
- President: Alfredo Pacheco
- Preceded by: Olfanny Méndez

Personal details
- Party: Modern Revolutionary Party
- Parent: Víctor D’Aza (father)
- Education: Pontificia Universidad Católica Madre y Maestra
- Occupation: Medical doctor Politician

Dharuelly Leany D'Aza Caraballo is a Dominican medical doctor and politician. She has been serving as Vice President of the Chamber of Deputies of the Dominican Republic since 2024.

== Education ==
Dharuelly D'Aza is natural from Santiago Province and is the daughter of also Dominican politician Victor D'Aza. She graduated with a degree in general medicine from Pontificia Universidad Católica Madre y Maestra and has completed specializations in internal medicine, endocrinology, and infertility.

== Career ==
She has built her career at the José María Cabral y Báez Regional University Hospital, where, during the COVID-19 pandemic in the Dominican Republic, from March 2020 to January 2022 D'Aza led the internal medicine team in the COVID-19 isolation unit.

D'Aza ran for Chamber of Deputies in the 2020 election for the Modern Revolutionary Party (PRM) to represent the Santiago Province, but despite receiving 7,000 votes, she was not elected. In the 2024 election, D'Aza ran again and got elected. D'Aza was sworn in as Vice President of the Chamber of Deputies on 16 August 2024 after being elected unanimously by the deputies.

She has worked also as radio presenter, English educator and has also been involved in philanthropist activities.

== Personal life ==
She is married to a doctor, with whom have a daughter.
