= Dominican Humanist Party =

Dominican Humanist Party Partido Humanista Dominicano
- Abbreviation: PHD
- President: Ramón Emilio Goris
- Founded: Pre-2006
- Ideology: Humanism
- Chamber of Deputies: 0 / 190

The Dominican Humanist Party (Spanish: Partido Humanista Dominicano) is a minor humanist political party of the Dominican Republic, without parliamentary representation after the 16 May 2006 election. In 2020, it received 0.84% of the vote in all elections that year. Its presidential candidate was Luis Abinader. The president of the Party, elected in 2021, is Ramón Emilio Goris.
