= Milagros Germán =

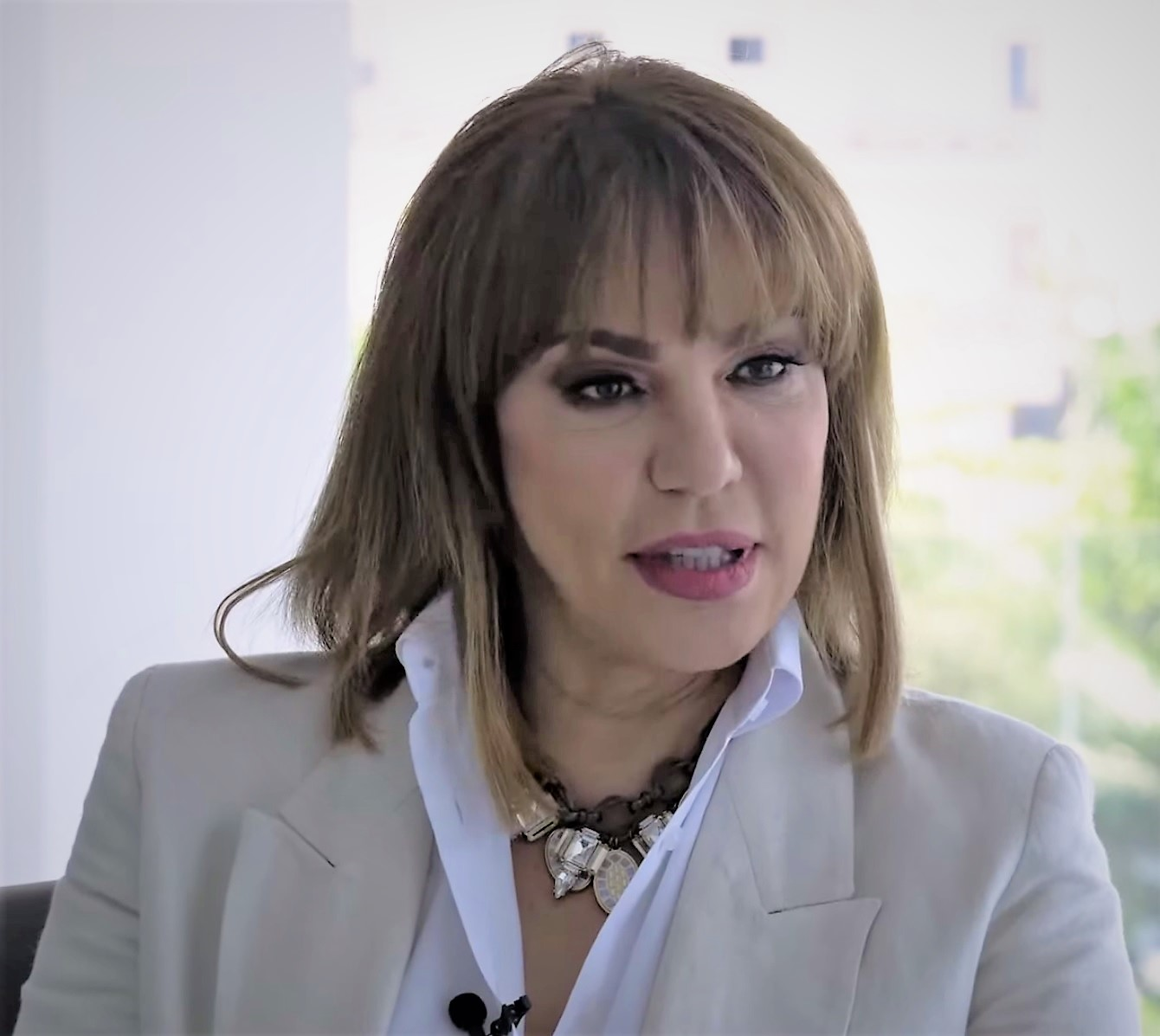
- Germán on La Gran Pregunta in 2019

Minister of Culture of the Dominican Republic
- Incumbent
- Assumed office 6 September 2021
- Preceded by: Carmen Heredia de Guerrero

Spokeswoman for the Presidency of the Dominican Republic
- In office 16 August 2020 – 6 September 2021
- Preceded by: Roberto Rodríguez de Marchena
- Succeeded by: Homero Figueroa

Personal details
- Born: Milagros Germán Olalla; 29 December 1958 (age 67) Province of Distrito Nacional
- Spouse: Hatuey de Camps (div.)
- Occupation: Presenter; producer; singer; actress
- Awards: Soberano Awards

Milagros Germán Olalla (born 29 December 1958) is a Dominican-Armenian actress, tv host, producer and beauty pageant titleholder who the winner of the Miss Dominican Republic 1980 and Miss Reinado Internacional del Cafe 1981 beauty pageants. She hosts her television show called Chévere Nights, along with presenters José Guillermo Cortines and Irving Alberti on Telesistema, channel 11. She is known for her monologues in favor of social causes.

== Personal life ==
Germán married the politician Hatuey de Camps, with whom she had 3 children, Milagros Marina, Álvaro and Andreas.

She is also a survivor of breast cancer, an experience that she has used to help others with the same health issues and promote the prevention of this type of disease.

== Trajectory ==
She started on television with presenter Mariasela Álvarez in 1991, in the program Con los ojos abiertos which was on the air for 4 years. Later, Germán started her own television project, Con Milagros Germán and later, Late at Night with Milagros, which began on the Telecentro television station, by which time Milagros was already a very popular figure.

In 1994, she began working with Freddy Beras Goico, El Gordo, affectionately nicknamed by his audience, on the program Con Freddy y Milagros, which lasted three years on air. While active, it was the most-watched prime-time show.

Then, on September 29, 2003, Germán began her original production Chévere Nights, a primetime television program that became the most-watched tv show on Dominican television for more than 15 years. Artists such as Luis Fonsi, Enrique Iglesias, Julio Iglesias, Paloma San Basilio, Víctor Manuelle, Juan Luis Guerra, Raphael from Spain, Cirque Elóize and personalities such as the first Dominicans who reached the top of Mount Everest, Karim Mella, have paraded through Chévere Nights.

Milagros ventures into the big screen with the film The Curse of Father Cardona, written and directed by Félix Germán and stars Zoe Saldaña and Anthony Alvarez. She has participated as well in international films such as La Fiesta del Chivo and in 2018 in the movie “Qué León” starring Ozuna and Clarissa Molina.

During the electoral campaign of the presidential candidate of the Modern Revolutionary Party (PRM) Luis Abinader, Germán emerged in public opinion as one of the possible candidates to occupy the vice presidency.

It was announced on July 10, 2020 via the Twitter account of the President-elect of the Dominican Republic, Luis Abinader, that Germán will be appointed as Director of Communications and Spokesperson for the Presidency. Germán is the first woman to hold this position.

=== See also ===
- Luis Abinader
- Leonel Fernández
- Danilo Medina
- Luis Almagro
- Adriano Espaillat
- Geovanny Vicente
- Tom Pérez
- Faride Raful
- José Ignacio Paliza
