= Revolutionary Social Democratic Party =

Minor political party

Revolutionary Social Democratic Party Partido Revolucionario Social Demócrata
- Founder: Hatuey De Camps
- Founded: January 21, 2005
- Split from: Dominican Revolutionary Party
- Ideology: Social democracy
- Political position: Center-left
- Regional affiliation: COPPPAL
- Chamber of Deputies: 3 / 190
- Senate: 0 / 32

The Revolutionary Social Democratic Party (Spanish: Partido Revolucionario Social Demócrata) is a minor political party of the Dominican Republic.

The party was formed by Hatuey de Camps, who was expelled from the Dominican Revolutionary Party in 2004.
