= Overseas constituency =

Type of electoral district

Countries with overseas constituencies in their parliaments.

An overseas constituency or overseas electoral district is any electoral district located outside of a nation-state's borders but which is recognized by the state's government as a district for the representation of its expatriate (and, technically, military) residents who live within the territory of another nation-state. Such constituencies are often organized in order to engage expatriate or diaspora voters who retain their citizenship.

The overseas constituency is considered different from intra-party primaries (organized and funded entirely by political parties or political party organizations with overseas offices) held overseas for expatriate voters.

Overseas constituencies may perform their votes at diplomatic embassies and consulates of their home nation-state, through absentee voting or through electronic voting (including Internet voting).

== Instances of government constituencies ==
=== Current ===
Country	Number of overseas seats		Legislature	Notes
Country	No. seats	% of total seats	Legislature	Notes
Algeria	8	1.32%	Parliament	Algeria reserves eight of its 382 parliamentary seats for citizens abroad, many of whom reside in France.
Angola	3	1.36%	National Assembly	Angola has adopted legislation to create three overseas electoral constituencies, but has not yet implemented external voting.
Cape Verde	3	4.17%	National Assembly	Three representatives are elected by the Cabo Verdian diaspora: 1 to represent Cabo Verdians living in Africa, 1 for the Americas, and 1 for Europe and the Rest of the World.
Colombia	1	0.34%	Congress (Chamber of Representatives)	A single seat in the Chamber of Representatives is reserved for Colombians abroad.
Croatia	3	1.99%	Parliament	A single, at-large, multi-member constituency is available for Croatians in the diaspora.
Dominican Republic	7	3.15%	Congress	Seven representatives are elected by the Dominican diaspora: two to represent Dominicans living in the Caribbean and Latin America, two for Europe, and three for Canada and the United States. This became effective in the 2012 Dominican presidential election, when Dominican expatriates could vote in by-elections for the new seats.
Ecuador	6	3.97%	National Assembly	Six representatives are elected by the Ecuadorian diaspora: two to represent Ecuadorians living in Latin America, the Caribbean and Africa; two for the United States and Canada; and two for Europe, Asia and Oceania.
El Salvador	6	10%	Legislative Assembly	The Legislative Assembly of El Salvador approved a constitutional reform in 2026 to create an overseas constituency for the Salvadoran diaspora. See right of Salvadoran expatriates to vote.
France	11	1.19%	Parliament (National Assembly)	In 2010, prior to the 2012 legislative election, the world was divided into eleven single-seat constituencies for French residents overseas to be represented in the National Assembly.
Greece	3	1%	Parliament	Greece introduced 3 overseas constituencies in 2026
Guinea-Bissau	2	1.96%	National People's Assembly	Guinea-Bissau has two overseas constituencies - one for Africa (Senegal, Gambia, Guinea, Cape Verde and Mauritania) and one for Europe (Portugal, Spain, France, Belgium and England).
Italy	12	1.98%	Parliament (Senate and Chamber of Deputies)	Italy has four overseas constituencies, which elect members to both the Senate and Chamber of Deputies.
Lithuania	1	0.71%	Seimas	Lithuania has one overseas constituency since 2020.
North Macedonia	3	2.5%	Assembly	Ahead of the 2011 election Macedonia created three parliamentary seats for its citizens abroad. They were divided into three constituencies comprising Europe/Africa, Americas, and Asia/Oceania.
Mozambique	2	0.8%	Assembly	Mozambique has overseas constituency one for citizens living in the rest of Africa, and one for those in the rest of the world.
Peru	3	1.58%	Congress (Senate and Chamber of Deputies)	One senator out of 60 and two deputies out of 130 are reserved for citizens abroad.
Portugal	4	1.74%	Assembly	Portugal's Assembly of the Republic seats four reserved seats for citizens abroad, two for living in the rest of Europe and the other two for those in the rest of the world.
Romania	6	1.29%	Parliament (Senate and Chamber of Deputies)	Bicameral Parliament consists of the Senate (136 seats, 2 reserved for the diaspora; members serve 4-year terms) and the Chamber of Deputies (329 seats, 17 reserved for non-Hungarian national minorities and 4 for the diaspora; members serve 4-year terms);
Tunisia	18	7.56%	Parliament	Eighteen of the 217 members of the Constituent Assembly of Tunisia (elected in 2011) represent Tunisians abroad. Almost a million Tunisians live abroad, including approximately 500,000 in France. Polling for Tunisians abroad took place in 80 countries around the world. France, Tunisia's former colonial ruler, elected ten representatives; Italy three; Germany one; North America and the rest of Europe two; and other Arab states two.
Ukraine	1	0.22%	Verkhovna Rada	Foreign electoral district of Ukraine

=== Former ===
The Cook Islands established provisions for an overseas parliamentary seat in 1981, but abolished it in 2003.

Taiwan formerly elected 6 representatives representing overseas constituents to the Legislative Yuan from 1947 to 2004. This constituency was merged in the 2008 election with the national at-large multi-member seat which covers all of Taiwan as well as all territory claimed by the Republic of China on the mainland, which is elected using Party-list proportional representation.

=== Expatriate voting in at-large parliamentary elections ===
Some countries which allow for overseas citizens to vote in parliamentary elections also have at-large constituencies in their parliaments, which technically allow for candidates to campaign for votes from, as well as represent, all overseas citizens as well as all domestic citizens simultaneously:

- Israel (All 120 seats in the Knesset): in practice, most overseas Israelis are only allowed to vote on Israeli soil, with voting outside of Israel available to restricted groups of military and diplomatic personnel that are stationed outside of Israel.
- Netherlands (All 150 seats in the House of Representatives)
- Peru (30 seats in the Senate, 50% of the total)
- Philippines (All 24 seats in the Senate, elected through First-past-the-post; 20% of seats in the House of Representatives, elected through Party-list proportional representation with a maximum 3 seats per party)
- Taiwan (34 seats in the Legislative Yuan, elected through party-list proportional representation; however, in practice, overseas Taiwanese are only allowed to vote in presidential elections. Voting is only allowed for overseas citizens who have once had household registration in the “Free Area”, and must be physically present at the polling location on the mainland. There is no provision for absentee voting, but overseas voters may update their voter registration by mail.)
- Thailand: (20% (100 seats) of the House of Representatives)
- Ukraine (50% of the up to 450 seats in the Verkhovna Rada elected through party-list PR): Ukrainian citizens who live abroad are allowed to vote for at-large party lists through the Foreign electoral district of Ukraine. Starting with the Next Ukrainian parliamentary election, citizens abroad will be able to vote for all 450 seats.

=== Issues and criticism ===
The establishment of overseas constituencies has generated concern among some governments over possible infringements over national sovereignty. Notably, the Canadian government of Stephen Harper in 2011 protested at the establishment of such constituencies covering the territory of Canada by France and Tunisia, and publicly declared that voting booths for the upcoming elections for both countries would not be allowed in Canadian territory. However, in 2012, an agreement was reached between the three countries whereby such booths could be located primarily in embassies and consulate offices. Canada was the only nation that opposed being included in the overseas constituencies.

== Instances of political party overseas constituencies ==
=== United Kingdom ===
Conservatives Abroad (CA) is the official political organization and global network of the Conservative Party for British citizens living permanently or temporarily abroad.

Labour International similarly represents overseas Labour Party voters.

The Liberal Democrats has an international branch, Lib Dems Abroad, encompassing some 2,000 party members living outside the UK. Lib Dems Abroad campaigns for improved representation for British citizens living overseas on a wide range of issues.

=== United States ===
Democrats Abroad is an organization which encourages support among U.S. citizens living overseas for the Democratic Party; it has sent a delegation to the Democratic National Convention since 1976 and held its first worldwide party primary in 2008. It is recognized as a "state committee" on par with other statewide committees within U.S. territory.
