= Miss Dominican Republic 1980 =

- Date: April 19, 1979
- Venue: Night Club La Fuente, Hotel Jaragua, Santo Domingo, Dominican Republic
- Broadcaster: Color Vision
- Entrants: 18
- Winner: Milagros Germán; Distrito Nacional

Señorita República Dominicana 1980 was held on April 19, 1979. There were 18 candidates who competed for the national crown. The winner represented the Dominican Republic at the Miss Universe 1980 . The Señorita República Dominicana Mundo entered the Miss World 1980 pageant. The Señorita República Dominicana Internacional would have entered Miss International 1980. The Señorita República Dominicana Café would have entered Reinado Internacional del Café 1980.

== Results ==
Internacional

Final results	Contestant
Señorita República Dominicana 1980	Distrito Nacional - Milagros Germán
Señorita República Dominicana Mundo	Santiago - Patricia Amelia Polanco Alvarez
Señorita República Dominicana Internacional	Distrito Nacional - Laura Fernández
Señorita República Dominicana Café	Puerto Plata - Amelia Gómez
Semi-finalists	Monte Cristi - Nolis Moya; Espaillat - Aurora Marmolejos; Azua - Gloria Pages; Santiago - Isabel Martínez; San Pedro de Macorís - Bettina Morey; Distrito Nacional - Francia Batista

== Delegates ==
- Azua - Gloria Pages Fernández
- Barahona - Sofia Betances Ferreira
- Distrito Nacional - Anna Teresa Marte
- Distrito Nacional - Francia Batista Read
- Distrito Nacional - Laura Fernández
- Distrito Nacional - Matty Rodríguez Guerrero
- Distrito Nacional - Milagros Germán
- Espaillat - Aurora Marmolejos
- Monte Cristi - Nolis Moya
- Puerto Plata - Amelia Gómez
- Puerto Plata - Patricia Ynoa Vega
- San Pedro de Macorís - Bettina Morey Haché
- San Pedro de Macorís - Patty Abud
- Santiago - Ana María Ramírez Bobadilla
- Santiago - Isabel Martínez
- Santiago - Patricia Amelia Polanco Alvarez
- Santiago - Roxanna de los Santos
- Valverde Mao - Miguelina Rosas
