= List of presidents of the Chamber of Deputies of the Dominican Republic =

The president of the Chamber of Deputies of the Dominican Republic is the speaker of the lower chamber of the legislature.

The lower chamber was called Tribunado 1844-1854, then Chamber of Representatives 1854-1878, and Chamber of Deputies since 1878.

== Presidents of Tribunado 1844-1854 ==
Name	Period	Notes
José Joaquín del Monte	1845	
Juan Bautista Lovalace	1846, 1847, 1849	
Francisco Javier Abreu	1846, 1847	
Tomás Bobadilla	1847	
Toribio López Villanueva	1848	
Felix María del Monte	1848, 1849, 1853	
Antonio Gutiérrez	1849	
José Mateo Perdomo	1850, 1851	
Gaspar Hernández	1851, 1852	
Félix Mercenario	1852	
Felipe Perdomo	1852, 1853	
José Román	1853	
Domingo Daniel Pichardo Pró	1854	

== Presidents of the lower chamber called Chamber of Representatives 1854-1878 ==
Name	Period	Notes
Felipe Perdomo	1854	
Pedro Pablo Bonilla	1854	
José Román	1854	
Federico Peralta	1854	
Francisco Javier Abreu	1866	
José del Carmen Reynoso	1866	
Juan Bautista Zafra	1867	
Melitón Valverde	1867	
Emiliano Tejera	1874	
Apolinar de Castro	1875-1876	
Félix Mariano Lluberes	1877	
Manuel de Jesús Galván	1878	
Fernando Arturo de Meriño	1878	
Pedro M. Piñeyro	1878	

== Presidents of the lower chamber called Chamber of Deputies since 1878 ==
Name	Period	Notes
Pedro M. Piñeyro	1879	
Manuel M. Cabral	1879	
Alejandro S. Vicioso	1879	
Manuel Piña Benítez	1879	
Isaías Franco Bidó	1880, 1881, 1896, 1897, 1899	
Domingo A. Rodríguez	1880	
Rafael M. Leyba	1880, 1881	
Alfredo Deetjen	1882, 1883, 1884	
Fernando Arturo de Meriño	1883	
Federico García Pérez	1884, 1885	
Rodolfo R. Boscowitz	1885	
Sebastián E. Valverde	1885	
Alejandro S. Vicioso	1886, 1888	
Juan Francisco Sánchez	1886	
Miguel A. Román	1887	
José M. Arzeno	1887-1888	
Eugenio C. de Marchena	1887	
Enrique Henríquez	1888, 1893	
Sergio Arturo de Moya	1888, 1899	
Pedro María Garrido	1889, 1890, 1891	
Manuel de Jesús Rodríguez	1889	
Luis T. del Castillo	1889, 1890, 1892	
Luis Arturo Bermúdez	1889, 1890, 1891	
Leovigildo Cuello	1889	
Juan M. Molina	1890, 1892	
Mariano Rodríguez Objío	1890	
Federico García Godoy	1891	
Julián Zorrilla	1891	
José E. Santelises	1892	
Hipólito Pierret	1893, 1894, 1896	
Jorge Curiel	1894, 1895	
Pedro A. Bobea	1895	
Carlos T. Nouel	1897, 1898	
Federico Leonte Vásquez Lajara	1897, 1898	
Isidro Mejía	1899	
José Furcy Castellanos	1899, 1903	
Rafael E. Galván	1899	
Rafael Abreu Licairac	1899, 1901, 1902	
José Dubeau	1899	
Emilio Prud’Homme	1900, 1901	
Manuel Ubaldo Gómez	1900, 1903	
José María Cabral y Báez	1901	
Pedro B. Coiscou	1901	
Carlos Morales Languasco	1901	
Juan José Sánchez	1902	
Rafael Justino Castillo	1902	
Manuel Arturo Machado	1903	
Ramón Báez	1903	
José E. Otero Nolasco	1904	
Francisco Richiez Ducoudray	1904	
Alberto Arredondo Miura	1904, 1905, 1906, 1908	
Manuel María Sanabia	1904	
Joaquín Morales Bernal	1904	
Manuel de Jesús Aybar	1905	
Joaquín Salazar	1905	
Israel Alvarez Cabrera	1905	
Ramón O. Lovatón	1906, 1907, 1908	
Manuel de Jesús Viñas	1906	
Octavio Beras	1906	
Agustín Acevedo	1908	
José E. Otero Nolasco	1908	
Octavio Beras	1908-1909	
Agustín Acevedo	1910-1911	
Salvador Otero Nolasco	1912	
Rodolfo Coiscou	1912	
Octavio Beras	1914	
Juan José Sánchez	1914-1915	
Luis Bernard	1915-1916	
Ernesto Bonelli Burgos	1924-1930	
Miguel Ángel Roca	1930-1936	
Daniel Henríquez Velásquez	1936-1937	
Arturo Pellerano Sardá	1937-1940	
Abelardo René Nanita León	1940-1942	
Manuel Arturo Peña Batlle	1942	
Porfirio Herrera Velásquez	1943-1955	
Rafael Francisco Prats Ramírez (Don Pachito)	1955-1956	
Carlos Sánchez y Sánchez	1956-1958	
José Ramón Rodríguez	1958-1961	
Carlos Rafael Goico Morales	1961-1962	
Miguel A. McCabe Aristy	1963	
Rafael R. Molina Ureña	1963	
Patricio Gerardo Badía Lara	1966-1970	
Atilio Antonio Guzmán Fernández	1970-1978	
Abraham Bautista Alcántara	1978-1979	
Hatuey DeCamps Jiménez	1979-1982	
Hugo Tolentino Dipp	1982-1986	
Fernando A. Amiama Tió	1986-1987	
Ramón Edilio Vargas Ortega	1987	
Luis José González Sánchez	1987-1990	
Norge William Botello Fernández	1990-1994	
Danilo Medina Sánchez	1994-1995	
José Ramón 'Monchy' Fadul y Fadul	1995-1996	
Héctor Rafael Peguero Méndez	1996-1999	
Rafaela Alburquerque de González	1999-2003	
Alfredo Pacheco Osoria	2003-2006	
Julio César Valentín Jiminián	2006-2010	
Abel Martínez Durán	2010-2016	
Lucía 'Yomaira' Medina Sánchez	2016–2017	
Rubén Darío Maldonado Díaz	2017–2018	
Radhamés Camacho	2018–2020	
Alfredo Pacheco	2020–	
