= Eduardo Estrella =

Dominican politician (born 1953)

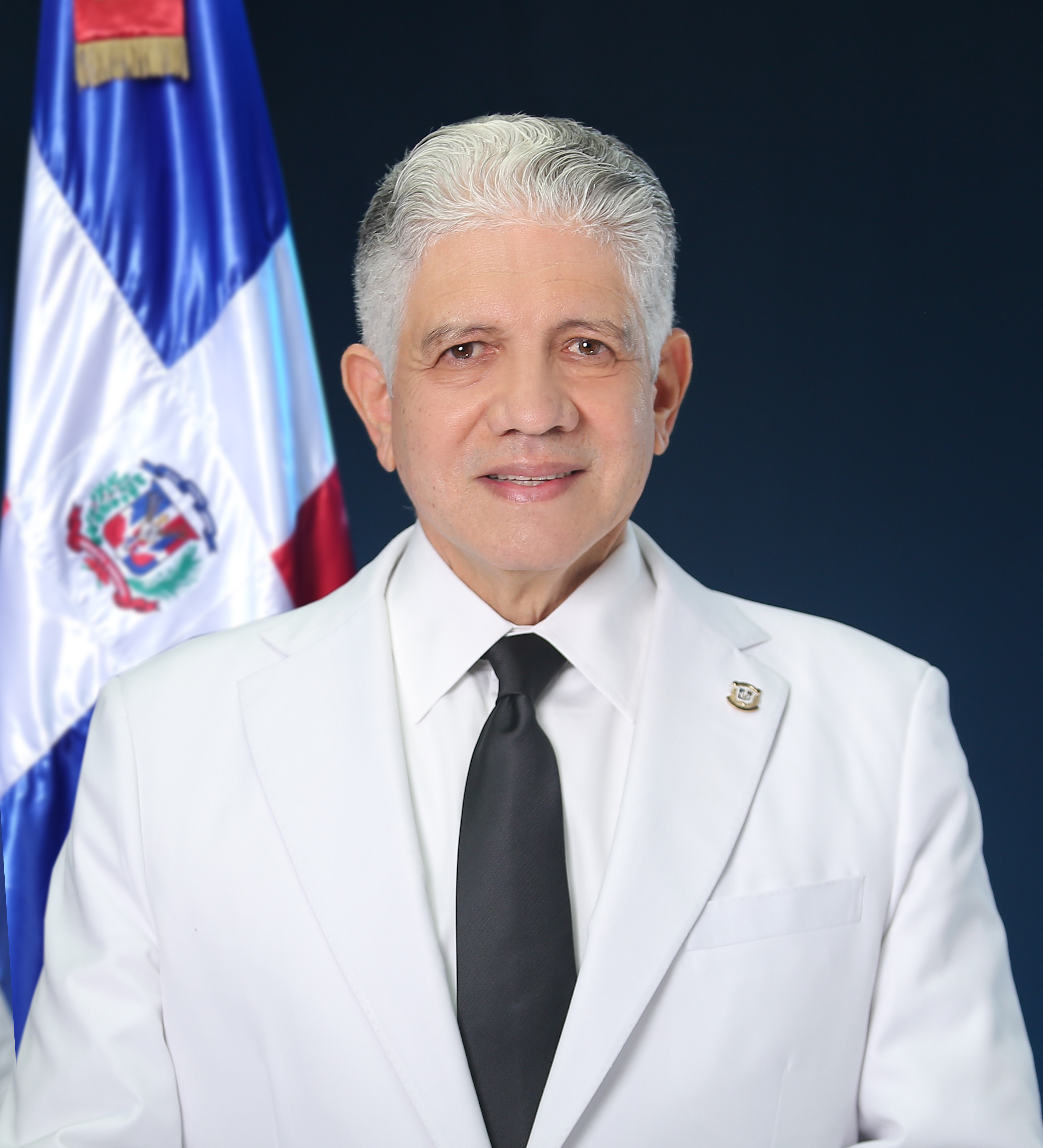
- Official portrait, 2020

President of the Senate of the Dominican Republic
- In office August 16, 2020 – August 16, 2023
- Preceded by: Reinaldo Pared Pérez
- Succeeded by: Ricardo De Los Santos

Member of the Dominican Republic Senate from Santiago Province
- In office August 16, 2020 – August 16, 2024
- Preceded by: Julio Cesar Valentin
- Succeeded by: Daniel Rivera
- In office August 16, 1994 – August 16, 1998
- Succeeded by: José Rafael Abinader

Secretary of State for Public Works and Communications
- In office 1991–1994
- President: Joaquín Balaguer

Executive Director of the National Institute of Water and Sewage
- In office 1990–1991
- President: Joaquín Balaguer

Under Secretary of State for Public Works and Communications
- In office 1986–1990
- President: Joaquín Balaguer

Secretary of Second Class in the Dominican Embassy in Mexico
- In office 1972–1975

President of Dominicanos por el Cambio party
- In office January 10, 2010 – February 07, 2018

Personal details
- Born: 5 June 1953 (age 73) Santo Domingo, Dominican Republic
- Party: Partido Dominicanos por el Cambio
- Spouse: Arelis Cruz de Estrella
- Children: Paula, Mabel and Eduardo Guarionex
- Education: Universidad Nacional Autónoma de México UNAM
- Occupation: Politician, Civil Engineer
- Website: www.eduardoestrella.com.do

Rafael Eduardo Estrella Virella (born June 5, 1953) is a civil engineer and Dominican politician, former senator and president of the Senate of the Dominican Republic from 2020 to 2023. He served as Minister (formerly "Secretary of State") for Public Works and Communications of the Dominican Republic during the second term 1991–94, of President Joaquín Balaguer and also he has served as senator for Santiago from 1994 to 1998, and has been serving again since 2020-2024.

He was the first presidential candidate of the Social Christian Reformist Party after the death of its leader, Dr. Joaquín Balaguer, after being elected in March 2003 as a presidential candidate of that organization. In 2007 he resigned from that organization to build a new party, since Social Christian Reformist Party was attached to the former government of Dominican Liberation Party and what he firmly opposed during the years, thus forming the Dominicans for Change Party, which controlled the presidency from 2004 to 2020. In August 2020, the current ruling government of the Modern Revolutionary Party (PRM) agreed to choose Estrella as Dominican Republic Senate President.

== Early life, education, and political career ==
Rafael Eduardo Estrella Virella was born on June 5, 1953, the son of Mayor General Guarionex Estrella and Mabel Elisa Virella de Estrella and grandson of General Pedro Antonio Estrella (Piro). His siblings are Paula, Mabel, Guarionex and Rosa Margarita. He married Arelis Cruz Estrella and they have three children: Paula Isabel, Eduardo Guarionex and Elisa Mabel. He is also the nephew of the national hero Salvador Estrella Sadhalá. He is married to Arelis Cruz de Estrella and they have three children. In 1961, when Estrella was 8 years old, his father was arrested and tortured under suspicion of complicity in the assassination of dictator Rafael Trujillo. Estrella describes this as the formative event of his youth.

Eduardo Estrella is from the second largest city in the Dominican Republic, Santiago, known as a breeding ground for politicians. He comes from a prominent family that protected opponents of Rafael Trujillo's 1930-61 dictatorship. His father and grandfather were senior military officers, and an uncle was among the conspirators who assassinated Trujillo a group now revered as national heroes.

Eduardo Estrella began his primary education at the Colegio Calasanz de Santo Domingo, continuing at the Colegio de la Salle in the city of Santiago de los Caballeros, which also took place in high school. His university studies were conducted at the Universidad Autónoma de México (UNAM), the United States of Mexico. Estrella graduated from the Autonomous University of Mexico (UNAM) with a civil engineering degree, and PRSC President Balaguer appointed him second secretary at the Dominican Embassy in Mexico City. Estrella returned to the Santiago area and served as president of the Northern Regional Dominican School of Engineers, Architects and Surveyors. Elected as Santiago's senator in 1986, he was appointed by Balaguer as Under Secretary for Public Works and Communications and in 1991 advanced to Secretary of State for Public Works and Communications, a post he held until 1994. Estrella returned to his elected position in the Senate from 1994 to 1998.

Estrella was politicized early and has described himself as a "Reformista at birth" He began his political career at age 19, when Balaguer appointed him as a Second Secretary in the Dominican Embassy in Mexico (Estrella was simultaneously undertaking civil engineering studies at the National Autonomous University (UNAM)). Estrella established a personal relationship with Balaguer after inviting Balaguer to his wedding to Arelis Cruz.

After being elected in the vice-mayor's office in Santiago in 1986, Estrella rose quickly through the Reformista ranks. He appeared as a personal favorite of Balaguer, as indicated by a series of increasingly important positions during the second Balaguer administration, including Undersecretary of Public Works (1986–90), Director of the National Institute for Potable Water and Sewage Treatment (1990–91), and Secretary of State for Public Works (1991–94). He was hand-picked by Balaguer to stand for the Senate seat for the Province of Santiago in 1998, which he won. Opposition political figures speak favorably of his time in the Senate, describing him as a "mediator." He was ultimately appointed to the Party's executive committee.

== Public offices held ==
- Senate of the Dominican Republic from Santiago de los Caballeros for the periods 1994–98 and 2020-2024. In that role actively participated in the adoption of the Law 24-97 Against Domestic Violence, Education 66–97, 352-98 Protection for the Elderly, among others.
- President of the Senate of the Dominican Republic 2020 to 2023.
- Appointed Secretary Second Class in the Dominican Embassy in Mexico in 1972.
- President of the Northern Regional Dominican College of Engineers, Architects and Surveyors, CODIA in 1984–85.
- Elected Trustee Alternate to Santiago de los Caballeros in the 1986–90 period.
- Secretary of State for Public Works and Communications of the President Dr. Joaquín Balaguer during the period 1986–90.
- Executive Director of the National Institute of Water and Wastewater, INAP, 1990–91.
- Secretary of State for Public Works and Communications (SEOPC) in the years 1991–94. Where he made an efficient management, transparent to employees, contractors and the public.

Personally supervising all the works executed and maintenance assistantships across the country. In its management works was awarded to engineers, architects and master builders, without whatever their politics, as remarkable secretary he accomplished many projects such as:

- Built hundreds of schools across the country.
- He ran a national plan to rebuild roads.
- Twin bridge construction Mella, Juan Bosch, Villa Rivas on Yuna River.
- Expansion the airport of Puerto Plata.
- Landing strip construction of Barahona Airport.
- The breakwater and the freight yard of Haina Pier.
- Rebuilt Puerto Manzanillo
- The Avenida del Puerto construction, and Ave. Mexico as well.
- The expansion of the Núñez de Cáceres with the tunnel
- The Republic of Colombia, Santo Domingo;
- The Yapur Dumit avenue and the Yaque River Bridge, Las Carreras Avenue and General Santiago Lopez Ave.
- Gran Teatro del Cibao

He paved hundreds of miles of streets and avenues in the main cities of the national territory, covering every street reconstruction of each of the municipalities in the border region of the country, from Manzanillo to Pedernales. The national plan for construction of housing projects, both apartments as homes, which took place throughout the national territory.

During the renovation of Gregorio Luperón International Airport, Estrella's company completed the project while the airport remained operational. According to construction executive Diego de Moya, the work was finished in less time than proposed by a competing French firm and at a cost approximately 40% lower, reportedly resulting in savings of US$20 million for the Dominican government.

On August 5, 2020, the new ruling PRM party agreed that Estrada should become President of the Senate during a meeting between its elected legislators and the party's senior leadership.

== Held political office ==
- Candidate for President of the Dominican Republic by the Social Christian Reformist Party in the elections of May 2004.
- Candidate for President of the Republic for the 2008 elections by a coalition of the fourth pathway composed of the Social Democratic Revolutionary Party (PRSD), Dominican Humanist (PHD) Organized National Front Movement (FRENO) and Dominican Movement for Change (DxC).
- President and Founder of the Partido Dominicanos por el Cambio - DxC.
- Founding member of the Foundation Dr. Joaquín Balaguer.

== Candidate for President of the Dominican Republic ==
Eduardo Estrella, 2004 presidential candidate for the third-ranked Social Christian Reform Party (PRSC or "Reformistas") and the second-place finisher in the fraud-wracked 2007 PRSC presidential primary, suggested in a July 13 meeting with Charge Bullen and poloff that he had for all intents and purposes left the PRSC. Estrella said his mission now is to launch an independent movement that stresses both morality and political activism - both themes of his unsuccessful primary campaign. The unstated motivation for leaving was his inability to inspire loyalty within the party leadership, combined with his personal distaste for PRSC presidential nominee Amable Aristy Castro. Estrella had slid from prominence over the last several years and there is no evidence to suggest that his departure will split the Party.

As presidential candidate Eduardo Estrella and Dominicans for Change Party support their management proposal government in reducing current expenditure, domestic savings, the rejection of tax policy and external debt, creating jobs, promoting small and medium enterprises, promotion of foreign exchange earnings, reducing cost of living and investment in education, health and housing among others.
