= Chamber of Deputies of the Dominican Republic =

Lower house of the Congress of the Dominican Republic

Chamber of Deputies Cámara de Diputados (Spanish)
- 2nd Ordinary Legislative Session of 2026
- Coat of arms of the Dominican Republic

Type
- Type: Lower house of the Congress of the Dominican Republic

History
- Established: November 6, 1844; 182 years ago
- New session started: 16 August 2026

Leadership
- President: Alfredo Pacheco Osoria (PRM) since 16 August 2020
- Vice President: Dharuelly Leany D'Aza Caraballo (PRM) since 16 August 2024
- Secretaries: Eduviges María Bautista Gomera & Julio Emil Durán Rodríguez (PRM) since 16 August 2025
- Majority Leader: Amado Antonio Díaz Jiménez (PRM) since 24 July 2026
- Minority Leader: José David Báez Reinoso (FP) since 10 August 2026

Structure
- Seats: 190
- Political groups: Government (146) (PRM and allies): PRM (140); PRSC (1); DxC (2); ALPAÍS (1); PCR (1); PLR (1); Opposition (44): FP (28) (FP and allies); PLD (13) (PLD and allies); PRD (1) (PRD and allies); PQDC (1); Independent (1)
- Committees: 52
- Length of term: 4 years
- Salary: RD$320,000 (Note: The president of the Chamber of Deputies receives a monthly base salary of RD$400,000.) (monthly)

Elections
- Voting system: Closed list proportional representation, D'Hondt method
- Last election: 19 May 2024
- Next election: 21 May 2028

Motto
- Somos tu Voz (We Are Your Voice)

Meeting place
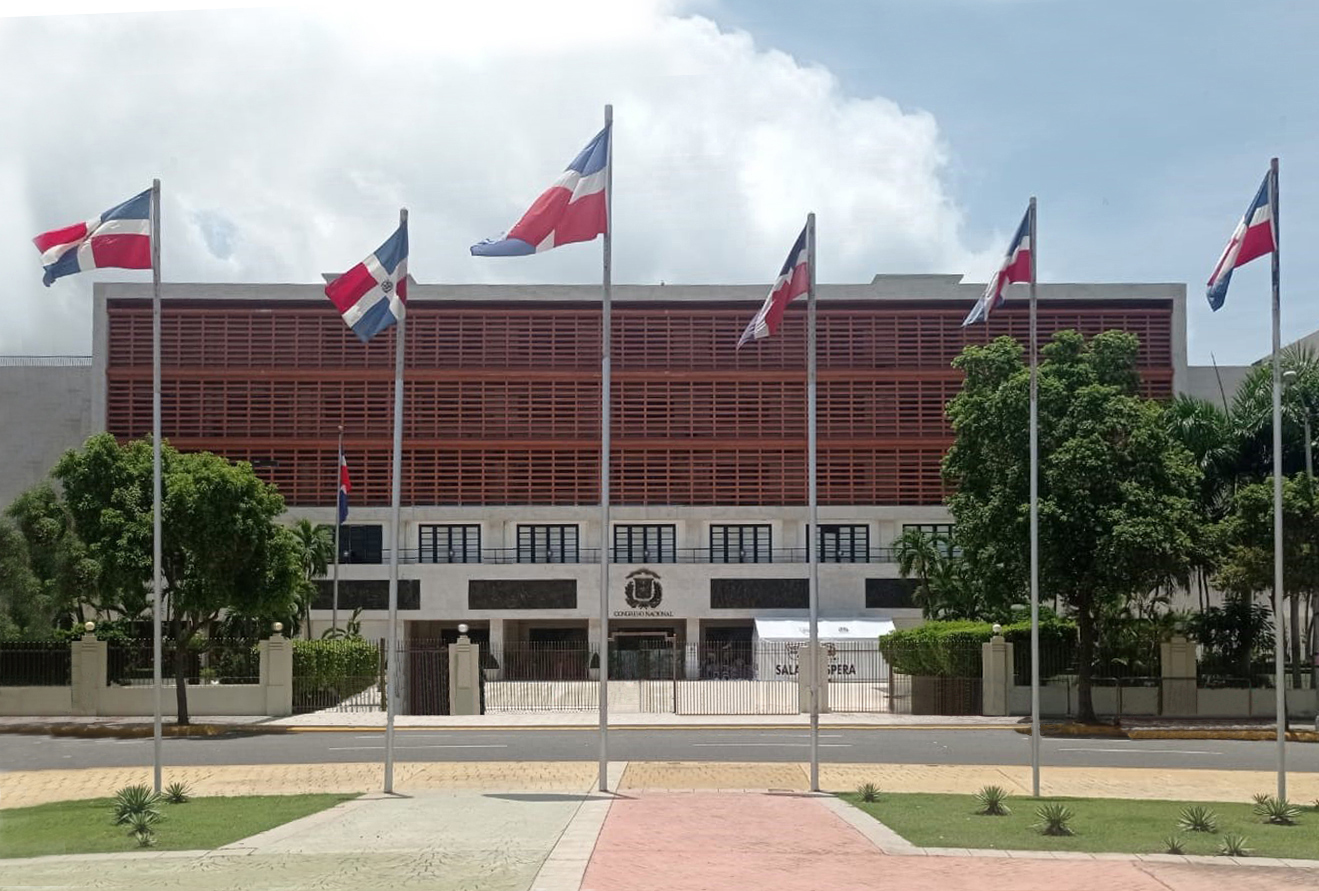
- Palace of the National Congress; Santo Domingo; Dominican Republic (2021)

Website
- camaradediputados.gob.do (in Spanish)

Constitution
- Constitution of the Dominican Republic

Rules
- Reglamento Interno de la Cámara de Diputados - Cámara de Diputados de la República Dominicana (in Spanish)

The Chamber of Deputies (Spanish: Cámara de Diputados) is the lower house of the Congress of the Dominican Republic. Together, it and the Senate comprise the legislature of the Dominican Republic.

The composition and powers of the House are established by Constitution of the Dominican Republic. The Chamber is composed of deputies who are divided in 178 by province, five nationally, and seven overseas.

The Chamber is charged with the passage of national legislation, known as laws, which, after concurrence by the Senate, are sent to the President of the Dominican Republic for consideration. In addition to this basic power, the Chamber has certain exclusive powers of which include the power to initiate all laws related to revenue, the Impeachment of officers elected by popular vote, the Senate or the National Council of the Magistracy who are sent to trial the Senate.

The lower chamber was called Tribunado 1844–1854, then Chamber of Representatives 1854–1878, and Chamber of Deputies since 1878.

== Current composition (2024–2028) ==
On 19 May 2024, deputies were elected, including some by provincial districts, five by national at-large voting, and seven by Overseas Deputies. This list contains the changes that occurred after the election until unknown.

==== Ruling party / Pro-government camp ====
- PRM bloc
  - Modern Revolutionary Party (140)
- PRSC bloc
  - Social Christian Reformist Party (1)
- ALPAÍS–DxC bloc
  - Dominicans for Change (1)
  - Country Alliance (1)
- PLR–PCR bloc
  - Civic Renovation Party (1)
  - Liberal Reformist Party (1)

==== Opposition ====
- FP bloc
  - People's Force (28)
- PLD bloc
  - Dominican Liberation Party (13)
- PQDC–PRD bloc
  - Dominican Revolutionary Party (1)
  - Quisqueyano Christian Democratic Party (1)

Deputy	Party	Electoral list	Province	Circumscription
Alfredo Pacheco Osoria	PRM	PRM	Distrito Nacional	2
Carlos Sánchez Quezada	PRM	PRM	Distrito Nacional	3
Charles Noel Mariotti Paz	PLD	PLD	Distrito Nacional	1
Chavely Melina Sánchez Taveras	PRM	PRM	Distrito Nacional	3
Eliazer Matos Féliz	PRM	PRM	Distrito Nacional	1
Fanny Selinés Méndez Simonó	FP	FP	Distrito Nacional	1
Francisca Trinidad Jaque Aponte	PRM	PRM	Distrito Nacional	3
Gustavo Antonio Sánchez García	PLD	PLD	Distrito Nacional	3
Jose Manuel Caraballo Gomez	PRM	PRM	Distrito Nacional	1
Liz Adriana Mieses Díaz	PRM	PRM	Distrito Nacional	1
Manuel de Jesús Núñez Guerrero	PRM	PRM	Distrito Nacional	2
Maribel Altagracia Almánzar de Ogando	PRM	PRM	Distrito Nacional	2
Rafael Anibal Diaz Rodriguez	PRM	PRM	Distrito Nacional	2
Rafael Tobías Crespo Pérez	FP	FP	Distrito Nacional	2
Ramón Antonio Bueno Patiño	PRM	PRM	Distrito Nacional	2
Sergio Moya de la Cruz	PRM	PRM	Distrito Nacional	3
Vicente Arturo Sánchez Henríquez	PRM	PRM	Distrito Nacional	1
Yuderka Yvelisse de la Rosa Guerrero	FP	FP	Distrito Nacional	3
Ángela Maruja Gregorina Pérez Díaz	PRM	PRM	Azua	Not applicable
Brenda Mercedes Ogando Campos	PRM	PRM	Azua	Not applicable
Julio Cesar Beltre Mendez	PRM	PRM	Azua	Not applicable
Nurca Nieves Luciano Jiménez de Galván	FP	FP	Azua	Not applicable
Juan Bolívar Cuevas Davis	PRM	PRM	Baoruco	Not applicable
Olfanny Yuverka Méndez Matos	PRM	PRM	Baoruco	Not applicable
Aquiles Leonel Ledesma Alcántara	PRM	PRM	Barahona	Not applicable
José del Carmen Montero Arias	PRM	PRM	Barahona	Not applicable
Sara Penélope Féliz Díaz	PRM	PRM	Barahona	Not applicable
Adelso de Jesús Ruben Contreras	PRM	PRM	Dajabón	Not applicable
Daritza Felicidad Zapata Díaz	PRM	PRM	Dajabón	Not applicable
Dorina Yajaira Rodríguez Salazar	PRM	PRM	Duarte	Not applicable
Jeovanny Ventura Rivera	PRM	PRM	Duarte	Not applicable
José Luis Rodríguez Hiciano	PRM	PRM	Duarte	Not applicable
Luis Tomás Marte Santos	PRM	PRM	Duarte	Not applicable
Nicolás Hidalgo Almánzar	PRM	PRM	Duarte	Not applicable
Faustina Guerrero Cabrera	PRM	PRM	El Seibo	Not applicable
Valerio Leonardo Palacio	PRM	PRM	El Seibo	Not applicable
Luis Enrique Castillo Ogando	PRM	PRM	Elías Piña	Not applicable
Millys Johanna Martínez Morillo	PRM	PRM	Elías Piña	Not applicable
José Miguel Ferreiras Torres	PRM	PRM	Espaillat	Not applicable
Marleni Altagracia Jiménez Muñoz	PRM	PRM	Espaillat	Not applicable
Robinson Antonio Santos Rodríguez	PRM	PRM	Espaillat	Not applicable
Shirley Antonia López Féliz	PRM	PRM	Espaillat	Not applicable
Carmen Ligia Barceló González	PRM	PRM	Hato Mayor	Not applicable
Héctor Fodil Rosa Mercedes	PRM	PRM	Hato Mayor	Not applicable
Félix Santiago Hiciano Almánzar	PRM	PRM	Hermanas Mirabal	Not applicable
Lourdes de Jesús Vélez	PRM	PRM	Hermanas Mirabal	Not applicable
Hermes Evangelina José Méndez de Méndez	PRM	PRM	Independencia	Not applicable
Llanelis Matos Cuevas	PRM	PRM	Independencia	Not applicable
Ángel del Rosario Robles	PRM	PRM	La Altagracia	Not applicable
Carmen Aurelia de la Rosa Pérez	PRM	PRM	La Altagracia	Not applicable
Francisco Rodolfo Villegas Pérez	PRM	PRM	La Altagracia	Not applicable
Jorge Leonardo Tavárez Valdez	FP	FP	La Altagracia	Not applicable
Onavel Andrés Aristy Cedeño	PLR	PRM	La Altagracia	Not applicable
Carlos de Pérez Juan	FP	FP	La Romana	Not applicable
Eugenio Cedeño Areché	PRM	PRM	La Romana	Not applicable
Jacqueline Fernández Brito	PRM	PRM	La Romana	Not applicable
Wandy Modesto Batista Gómez	PRM	PRM	La Romana	Not applicable
Carolin Mercedes de la Cruz	PRM	PRM	La Vega	1
Elpidio Infante Galán	PRM	PRM	La Vega	1
Gabriela María Abreu Santos	PRM	PRM	La Vega	2
Gilda Mercedes Moronta Guzmán	FP	FP	La Vega	1
José Luis Abreu Veloz	PRM	PRM	La Vega	1
Rogelio Alfonso Genao Lanza	Independent	PRM	La Vega	2
Vilma Hortencia Morillo Vásquez	PRM	PRM	La Vega	1
Jesús Stalin Vásquez Marte	PRM	PRM	María Trinidad Sánchez	Not applicable
Jorge Hugo Cavoli Balbuena	PRM	PRM	María Trinidad Sánchez	Not applicable
Sonia Núñez Espino	PRM	PRM	María Trinidad Sánchez	Not applicable
José Antonio Fabián Beltré	FP	FP	Monseñor Nouel	Not applicable
Nolberto Ortiz de la Cruz	PRM	PRM	Monseñor Nouel	Not applicable
Orlando Antonio Martínez Peña	PRM	PRM	Monseñor Nouel	Not applicable
Jhonatan Rabel Contreras del Orbe	PRM	PRM	Monte Plata	Not applicable
Oscar Adolfo Morel Figueroa	PLD	PLD	Monte Plata	Not applicable
Román de Jesús Vargas	PRM	PRM	Monte Plata	Not applicable
Johanny Margarita Martínez Gómez	PRM	PRM	Monte Cristi	Not applicable
Rosendy Joel Polanco Polanco	PRM	PRM	Monte Cristi	Not applicable
Mery Antonia Mercado García de Contreras	PRM	PRM	Pedernales	Not applicable
Rafael Antonio Pérez Gómez	PRM	FP	Pedernales	Not applicable
Carmen Leida Escarfuller Morel de Melo	PRM	PRM	Peravia	Not applicable
Luis Alcides Báez	PRM	PRM	Peravia	Not applicable
Willy Enrique Sánchez González	PRM	PRM	Peravia	Not applicable
Fiordaliza Estévez Castillo	PRSC	PRM	Puerto Plata	2
Heidy María Musa Kunhardt	PLD	PLD	Puerto Plata	1
Jhonny de Jesús Medina Santos	PRM	PRM	Puerto Plata	1
Juan Agustín Medina Santos	PRM	PRM	Puerto Plata	2
Julio Emil Durán Rodríguez	PRM	PRM	Puerto Plata	1
Lidia Esther Pérez de Taveras	PRM	PRM	Puerto Plata	1
Carmen Lidia Williams Benjamín	PRM	PRM	Samaná	Not applicable
Cecilio García Javier	PRM	PRM	Samaná	Not applicable
Ana Miledy Cuevas	PRM	PRM	San Cristóbal	1
Antonio Brito Rodríguez	FP	FP	San Cristóbal	3
Francisco Javier Paulino	PRM	PRM	San Cristóbal	2
German Martínez Araujo	FP	FP	San Cristóbal	2
Gregoria Monserrat Santana Silfa	PRM	PRM	San Cristóbal	1
Jacqueline Montero	PRM	PRM	San Cristóbal	3
Margarita Tejeda de la Rosa	PRM	PRM	San Cristóbal	3
Nelson Saulo Vega Báez	PLD	PLD	San Cristóbal	2
Otoniel Tejeda Martínez	PRM	PRM	San Cristóbal	2
Ydenia Doñé Tiburcio	PLD	PLD	San Cristóbal	1
Ángel María Sánchez Pujols	PRM	PRM	San José de Ocoa	Not applicable
Elida Yalis Soto Mordán	PRM	PRM	San José de Ocoa	Not applicable
Carlos Morillo Valdez	PRM	PRM	San Juan	Not applicable
Elvira Corporán de los Santos de Lebrón	PRM	PRM	San Juan	Not applicable
Franklin Ramírez de los Santos	PRM	PRM	San Juan	Not applicable
Mélido Mercedes Castillo	FP	FP	San Juan	Not applicable
Alcibíades Tavárez de la Cruz	FP	FP	San Pedro de Macorís	Not applicable
Carlixta Carolina Paula de la Cruz	PRM	PRM	San Pedro de Macorís	Not applicable
Jacobo Ramos Crispín	PRM	PRM	San Pedro de Macorís	Not applicable
Luis Gómez Benzo	PRM	PRM	San Pedro de Macorís	Not applicable
Miguel Arredondo Quezada	PRM	PRM	San Pedro de Macorís	Not applicable
Caty Díaz Abreu	PRM	PRM	Sánchez Ramírez	Not applicable
José Alberto Jiménez Santos	FP	PRD	Sánchez Ramírez	Not applicable
Sadoky Duarte Suárez	PRM	PRM	Sánchez Ramírez	Not applicable
Brailyn Miguel Vargas Núñez	PLD	PLD	Santiago	3
Braulio de Jesús Espinal Tavárez	PDC	PRM	Santiago	2
Deisy Emelda Díaz Salcedo	PRM	PRM	Santiago	1
Dharuelly Leany D´Aza Caraballo	PRM	PRM	Santiago	1
Dilenia Altagracia Santos Muñoz	PRM	PRM	Santiago	3
Estamy Rafaela Colón Tatis	PRM	PRM	Santiago	1
Félix Michell Rodríguez Morel	FP	FP	Santiago	3
Francisco Alberto Díaz García	PRM	PRM	Santiago	2
Gregorio Domínguez Domínguez	PRM	PRM	Santiago	3
José David Báez Reinoso	FP	FP	Santiago	1
Llaniris del Carmen Espinal Cabrera	PRM	FP	Santiago	2
Mateo Evangelista Espaillat Tavárez	PDC	PRM	Santiago	1
Mirna Josefina López Francisco de Matos	PRM	PRM	Santiago	2
Nelsa Shoraya Suárez Ariza	PRM	PRM	Santiago	3
Nelson Rafael Marmolejos Gil	PRM	PRM	Santiago	3
Ramón Mayobanex Martínez Durán	PLD	PLD	Santiago	1
Robinson de Jesús Díaz Mejía	PRM	PRM	Santiago	1
Juana Ramona Castillo	PRM	PRM	Santiago Rodríguez	Not applicable
Nicolás Tolentino López Mercado	PRM	PRM	Santiago Rodríguez	Not applicable
Abelardo Antonio Rutinel Arzeno	PRM	PRM	Santo Domingo	1
Aldoneris Rafael Adón Duarte	PRM	PRM	Santo Domingo	5
Alexander Javier Cuevas	PRM	PRM	Santo Domingo	5
Altagracia de los Santos	PRM	PRM	Santo Domingo	3
Amado Antonio Díaz Jiménez	PRM	PRM	Santo Domingo	1
Ana Adalgiza del Carmen Abreu Polanco	PRM	PRM	Santo Domingo	1
Anny Veleissy Mambrú Rodríguez	PRM	PRM	Santo Domingo	1
Bolívar Ernesto Valera Ariza	PRM	PRM	Santo Domingo	2
Carlos Alberto Pérez Hernández	FP	FP	Santo Domingo	6
Carlos José Gil Rodríguez	FP	PLD	Santo Domingo	3
Damarys Vásquez Castillo	PLD	PLD	Santo Domingo	6
Dellys Dumidia Féliz Rodríguez	PRM	PRM	Santo Domingo	2
Diómedes Omar Rojas	PRM	PRM	Santo Domingo	6
Domingo Eusebio de León Mascarós	FP	FP	Santo Domingo	5
Eduviges María Bautista Gomera	PRM	PRM	Santo Domingo	4
Enriqueta Rojas Javier	FP	FP	Santo Domingo	6
Eudy Maldonado de la Cruz	FP	FP	Santo Domingo	6
Félix Manuel Encarnación Montero	PRM	PRM	Santo Domingo	4
Franklin Martínez	PLD	PLD	Santo Domingo	3
Heriberto Aracena Montilla	FP	FP	Santo Domingo	3
Ignacio Aracena	PRM	PRM	Santo Domingo	4
Indhira Shary de Jesús de Morla	PRM	PRM	Santo Domingo	4
Jesús Manuel Sánchez Martínez	PRM	PRM	Santo Domingo	5
Jheyson Amir García Castillo	PRM	PRM	Santo Domingo	3
José Moisés Ortiz López	PRM	PRM	Santo Domingo	3
Juan Carlos Echavarría Milané	PLD	PLD	Santo Domingo	1
Juan José Rojas Franco	PRM	PRM	Santo Domingo	3
Junior Muñoz Olivo	PRM	PRM	Santo Domingo	6
Kinsberly Taveras Duarte	PRM	PRM	Santo Domingo	5
Lucila Leonarda de León Martínez	PRM	PRM	Santo Domingo	6
María Elisa Suárez Alcalá	PRM	PRM	Santo Domingo	3
Melvin Alexis Lara Melo	PRM	PRM	Santo Domingo	6
Miguel Alberto Bogaert Marra	PRM	PRM	Santo Domingo	4
Miguel Eduardo Espinal Muñoz	FP	FP	Santo Domingo	4
Minerva Claudel Frías Ogando	PRM	PRM	Santo Domingo	2
Patricia Alexandra Núñez Rivera	PRM	PRM	Santo Domingo	6
Pedro Julio Alcántara	PRM	PRM	Santo Domingo	3
Rafael Augusto Castillo Casado	FP	FP	Santo Domingo	2
Rafaela González González	FP	FP	Santo Domingo	5
Tayluma Monserrat Calderón Fortuna	FP	FP	Santo Domingo	3
Víctor Virgilio Jiménez	FP	FP	Santo Domingo	4
Yancarlos Simanca Ferreras	PRM	PRM	Santo Domingo	3
Ycelmary Brito O´Neal	FP	FP	Santo Domingo	1
José Altagracia Valenzuela Arias	PRM	PRM	Valverde	Not applicable
María de los Ángeles Rodríguez Bonseñor	PRM	PRM	Valverde	Not applicable
Rubén Darío Peñaló Torres	PRM	PRM	Valverde	Not applicable
Danilo Darío Díaz Vizcaíno	PLD	PLD	At-large	Not applicable
Elías Wessin Chávez	PQDC	FP	At-large	Not applicable
Jorge Manuel Zorrilla González	PCR	PCR	At-large	Not applicable
Ramón Antonio Raposo Rodríguez	PRD	PRD	At-large	Not applicable
Adelis de Jesús Olivares Ortega	PRM	PRM	Overseas constituency	2
Angélica Natividad Novas Sierra	PRM	PRM	Overseas constituency	3
Cirilo Ustasio Moronta Then	PRM	PRM	Overseas constituency	1
Edward Enrique Cruz Asunción	PRM	PRM	Overseas constituency	2
Julio César López Peña	PRM	PRM	Overseas constituency	3
Kenia Felicia Bidó Parra de Dell´Aquila	PRM	PRM	Overseas constituency	1
Norberto Rodríguez Vásquez	PRM	PRM	Overseas constituency	1

== Composition (2020–2024) ==
Deputy	Party	Electoral List	Province	Constituency
JOSÉ HORACIO; RODRÍGUEZ GRULLÓN	OD	ALPAÍS	Distrito Nacional	1
OMAR LEONEL; FERNÁNDEZ DOMÍNGUEZ	FP	PRSC	Distrito Nacional	1
SANDRA HERMINIA; ABINADER SUERO DE PRIETO	PLD	PLD	Distrito Nacional	1
ISABEL JACQUELINE; ORTIZ FLORES	PLD	PLD	Distrito Nacional	1
ORLANDO SALVADOR; JORGE VILLEGAS	PRM	PRM	Distrito Nacional	1
ELIAZER; MATOS FÉLIZ	PRM	PRM	Distrito Nacional	1
LOURDES JOSEFINA; AYBAR DIONISIO	FP	PLD	Distrito Nacional	2
RAFAEL TOBÍAS; CRESPO PÉREZ	FP	PLD	Distrito Nacional	2
RAFAEL ANÍBAL; DÍAZ RODRÍGUEZ	PRM	PRM	Distrito Nacional	2
JESÚS BIENVENIDO; OGANDO GIL	PRM	PRM	Distrito Nacional	2
ALFREDO; PACHECO OSORIA	PRM	PRM	Distrito Nacional	2
YUDERKA YVELISSE; DE LA ROSA GUERRERO	FP	PRSC	Distrito Nacional	3
MANUEL ELPIDIO; BÁEZ MEJÍA	PLD	PLD	Distrito Nacional	3
GUSTAVO ANTONIO; SÁNCHEZ GARCÍA	PLD	PLD	Distrito Nacional	3
CARLOS; SÁNCHEZ QUEZADA	PLD	PLD	Distrito Nacional	3
RAMÓN ANTONIO; BUENO PATIÑO	PRM	PRM	Distrito Nacional	3
JOSÉ MIGUEL; CABRERA	PRM	PRM	Distrito Nacional	3
SERGIO; MOYA DE LA CRUZ	PRM	PRM	Distrito Nacional	3
JULIO ALBERTO; BRITO PEÑA	PLD	PLD	Azua	-
LUIS ANTONIO; VARGAS RAMÍREZ	PLD	PLD	Azua	-
BRENDA MERCEDES; OGANDO CAMPOS	PRM	PRM	Azua	-
CARLOS ALBERTO; RAMÍREZ FILPO	PRM	PRM	Azua	-
RAFAEL; CUEVAS JIMÉNEZ	PLD	PLD	Bahoruco	-
OLFANNY YUVERKA; MÉNDEZ MATOS	RSD	PRM	Bahoruco	-
MANUEL MIGUEL; FLORIÁN TERRERO	DHP	DHP	Barahona	-
RUDY MARÍA; MÉNDEZ	PLD	PLD	Barahona	-
MOISÉS; AYALA PÉREZ	PRM	DHP	Barahona	-
SONIA; AGÜERO MORALES	PLD	PLD	Dajabón	-
DARÍO DE JESÚS; ZAPATA ESTÉVEZ	PRM	PRM	Dajabón	-
YENRRY MANUEL; ACOSTA OVALLE	PLD	PLD	Duarte	-
LUPE; NÚÑEZ ROSARIO	PLD	PLD	Duarte	-
NICOLÁS; HIDALGO ALMÁNZAR	PRM	PRM	Duarte	-
JOSÉ LUIS; RODRÍGUEZ HICIANO	PRM	PRM	Duarte	-
DORINA YAJAIRA; RODRÍGUEZ SALAZAR	PRM	PRM	Duarte	-
GERARDO ALFREDO; CASANOVA JIMÉNEZ	PLD	PLD	El Seibo	-
FAUSTINA; GUERRERO CABRERA	PRM	PRM	El Seibo	-
JUAN ALBERTO; AQUINO MONTERO	PLD	PLD	Elías Piña	-
ISRAEL PORFIRIO BIENVENIDO; MAÑÓN ALCÁNTARA	PRM	PRM	Elías Piña	-
CARLOS MARÍA; GARCÍA GÓMEZ	FP	PLD	Espaillat	-
CARLOS ALBERTO; AMARANTE GARCÍA	PLD	PLD	Espaillat	-
JOSÉ MIGUEL; FERREIRAS TORRES	PRM	PRM	Espaillat	-
JEFRY JOSÉ; GRULLÓN LUGO	PRM	PRM	Espaillat	-
SAURY ANTONIO; MOTA RAMÍREZ	PRD	PRD	Hato Mayor	-
SANTIAGO; VILORIO LIZARDO	PRM	PRM	Hato Mayor	-
CHARLENE; CANAÁN CABRERA	FP	PLD	Hermanas Mirabal	-
FÉLIX SANTIAGO; HICIANO ALMÁNZAR	PRM	PRM	Hermanas Mirabal	-
GADDIS ENRIQUE; CORPORÁN SEGURA	PLD	CPP	Independencia	-
LLANELIS; MATOS CUEVAS	PRM	PRM	Independencia	-
FRANCISCO ANTONIO; SOLIMÁN RIJO	APD	APD	La Altagracia	-
FRANCISCO RODOLFO; VILLEGAS PÉREZ	APD	APD	La Altagracia	-
HAMLET AMADO; SÁNCHEZ MELO	FP	PLD	La Altagracia	-
JUAN JULIO; CAMPOS VENTURA	PLD	PLD	La Altagracia	-
AIDA NILSA; LÓPEZ REYNA DE CEBALLOS	PLR	PLR	La Altagracia	-
EDUARD ALEXIS; ESPIRITUSANTO CASTILLO	FP	SDIB	La Romana	-
PLUTARCO; PÉREZ	PLD	PLD	La Romana	-
EUGENIO; CEDEÑO ARECHE	PRM	PRM	La Romana	-
PEDRO TOMÁS; BOTELLO SOLIMÁN	PRSC	PRSC	La Romana	-
ROSA AMALIA; PILARTE LÓPEZ	PDC	PRM	La Vega	1
ÁNGEL TEÓFILO; ESTÉVEZ ESTÉVEZ	PLD	PLD	La Vega	1
JOSÉ RAFAEL; HERNÁNDEZ PORTES	PLD	PLD	La Vega	1
AGUSTÍN; BURGOS TEJADA	PRM	PRM	La Vega	1
JOSÉ DAVID; PÉREZ REYES	PRM	PRM	La Vega	1
CARLOS MÁXIMO; MEJÍA ABREU	PLD	PLD	La Vega	2
ROGELIO ALFONSO; GENAO LANZA	PRSC	PRM	La Vega	2
PRISCILA CELVIA; D’OLEO AGÜERO	PLD	PLD	María Trinidad Sánchez	-
JORGE HUGO; CAVOLI BALBUENA	PRM	PRM	María Trinidad Sánchez	-
NAPOLEÓN; LÓPEZ RODRÍGUEZ	PRM	PRM	María Trinidad Sánchez	-
MARÍA MERCEDES; FERNÁNDEZ CRUZ	PLD	PLD	Monseñor Nouel	-
ORLANDO ANTONIO; MARTÍNEZ PEÑA	PRM	PRM	Monseñor Nouel	-
NOLBERTO; ORTIZ DE LA CRUZ	PRM	PRM	Monseñor Nouel	-
RAFAEL ANTONIO; ABEL LORA	PLD	PLD	Monte Cristi	-
ROSENDY JOEL; POLANCO POLANCO	PRM	PRM	Monte Cristi	-
JUAN; SUAZO MARTE	PLD	PLD	Monte Plata	-
PEDRO ANTONIO; TINEO NÚÑEZ	PRM	PRM	Monte Plata	-
ROMÁN DE JESÚS; VARGAS	PRM	PRM	Monte Plata	-
HÉCTOR DARÍO; FÉLIZ FÉLIZ	PRD	PRD	Pedernales	-
EDIRDA YOALIS; DE OLEO PEÑA	PRM	PRM	Pedernales	-
ANA MERCEDES; RODRÍGUEZ DE AGUASVIVAS	PLD	PLD	Peravia	-
LUIS; ALCIDES BÁEZ	PRM	PRM	Peravia	-
JULITO; FULCAR ENCARNACIÓN	PRM	PRM	Peravia	-
IVANNIA; RIVERA NÚÑEZ	FP	PLD	Puerto Plata	1
FÉLIX ANTONIO; CASTILLO RODRÍGUEZ	PLD	PLD	Puerto Plata	1
JULIO EMÍL; DURÁN RODRÍGUEZ	PRM	PRM	Puerto Plata	1
JHONNY DE JESÚS; MEDINA SANTOS	PRM	PRM	Puerto Plata	1
RAMÓN ALBERTO; DORREJO CALVO	PLD	PLD	Puerto Plata	2
JUAN AGUSTÍN; MEDINA SANTOS	PRM	PRM	Puerto Plata	2
DANNY RAFAEL; GUZMÁN ROSARIO	PLD	PLD	Samaná	-
RAMÓN ANÍBAL; OLEA MEJÍA	PRM	PRM	Samaná	-
YDENIA; DOÑÉ TIBURCIO	PLD	PLD	San Cristóbal	1
EDDY OSCAR; MONTÁS GUERRERO	PLD	PLD	San Cristóbal	1
DIONISIO; DE LA ROSA RODRÍGUEZ	PRM	PRM	San Cristóbal	1
GUSTAVO; LARA SALAZAR	PRM	PRM	San Cristóbal	1
MANUEL ANTONIO; DÍAZ SANTOS	PLD	PLD	San Cristóbal	2
FRANCISCO JAVIER; PAULINO	PRM	PRM	San Cristóbal	2
OTONIEL; TEJEDA MARTÍNEZ	PRM	PRM	San Cristóbal	2
TULIO; JIMÉNEZ DÍAZ	PLD	PLD	San Cristóbal	3
FRANK JUNIOR; GUERRERO MATEO	PRM	PRM	San Cristóbal	3
MARGARITA; TEJEDA DE LA ROSA	PRM	PRM	San Cristóbal	3
JOSEFA ALTAGRACIA; MEJÍA MACEA	FP	PLD	San José de Ocoa	-
ALTAGRACIA YARELYS; ENCARNACIÓN GERÓNIMO	PRM	PRM	San José de Ocoa	-
NIDIO; ENCARNACIÓN SANTIAGO	BF	BF	San Juan	-
FRANKLIN; RAMÍREZ DE LOS SANTOS	BF	BF	San Juan	-
MÉLIDO; MERCEDES CASTILLO	FP	PLD	San Juan	-
FABIANA; TAPIA VALENZUELA	PLD	PLD	San Juan	-
PEDRO CÉSAR; MOTA PACHECO	PLD	PLD	San Pedro de Macorís	-
FIOR DALIZA; PEGUERO VARELA	PRD	PRD	San Pedro de Macorís	-
LUIS; GÓMEZ BENZO	PRM	PRM	San Pedro de Macorís	-
CARLIXTA CAROLINA; PAULA DE LA CRUZ	PRM	PRM	San Pedro de Macorís	-
RAFAELA; ALBURQUERQUE DE GONZÁLEZ	PRSC	PLD	San Pedro de Macorís	-
VERÓNICA MARÍA; CONTRERAS DE JESÚS	PLD	PLD	Sánchez Ramírez	-
GERALDO ANTONIO; CONCEPCIÓN VARGAS	PRM	PRM	Sánchez Ramírez	-
SADOKY; DUARTE SUÁREZ	PRM	PRM	Sánchez Ramírez	-
MATEO EVANGELISTA; ESPAILLAT TAVÁREZ	PDC	PRM	Santiago	1
RAMÓN MAYOBANEX; MARTÍNEZ DURÁN	PLD	PLD	Santiago	1
HÉCTOR BIENVENIDO; RAMÍREZ BIDÓ	PLD	PLD	Santiago	1
VÍCTOR VALDEMAR; SUÁREZ DÍAZ	PLD	PLD	Santiago	1
LEONARDO ALFONSO; AGUILERA QUIJANO	PRM	PRM	Santiago	1
GREGORIO; DOMÍNGUEZ DOMÍNGUEZ	PRM	PRM	Santiago	1
MIGUEL ANDRÉS; GUTIÉRREZ DÍAZ	PRM	PRM	Santiago	1
MÁXIMO; CASTRO	PRSC	PRSC	Santiago	1
ROSA HILDA; GENAO DÍAZ	PLD	PLD	Santiago	2
JOSÉ BENEDICTO; HERNÁNDEZ TEJADA	PLD	PLD	Santiago	2
FRANCISCO ALBERTO; DÍAZ GARCÍA	PRM	PRM	Santiago	2
BRAULIO DE JESÚS; ESPINAL TAVÁREZ	PRSC	PRSC	Santiago	2
FÉLIX MICHELL; RODRÍGUEZ MOREL	FP	PLD	Santiago	3
VÍCTOR MANUEL; FADUL LANTIGUA	PLD	PLD	Santiago	3
MAGDA ALINA ALTAGRACIA; RODRÍGUEZ AZCONA	PLD	PLD	Santiago	3
LUIS RENÉ; FERNÁNDEZ TAVÁREZ	PRM	PRM	Santiago	3
NELSON RAFAEL; MARMOLEJOS GIL	PRM	PRM	Santiago	3
NELSA SHORAYA; SUÁREZ ARIZA	PRM	PRM	Santiago	3
ESTEBAN ANTONIO; CRUZ	PLD	PLD	Santiago Rodríguez	-
NICOLÁS TOLENTINO; LÓPEZ MERCADO	PRM	PRM	Santiago Rodríguez	-
YCELMARY; BRITO O’NEAL	FP	FP	Santo Domingo	1
JUAN CARLOS; ECHAVARRÍA MILANÉ	PLD	PLD	Santo Domingo	1
LUIS MANUEL; HENRÍQUEZ BEATO	PLD	PLD	Santo Domingo	1
GILBERTO ANTONIO; BALBUENA ARIAS	PRM	PRM	Santo Domingo	1
ANA ADALGIZA; DEL CARMEN ABREU POLANCO	PRM	PRM	Santo Domingo	1
AMADO ANTONIO; DÍAZ JIMÉNEZ	PRM	PRM	Santo Domingo	1
RAFAEL AUGUSTO; CASTILLO CASADO	PLD	PLD	Santo Domingo	2
BOLÍVAR ERNESTO; VALERA ARIZA	PLD	PLD	Santo Domingo	2
CARLOS HIGINIO; DE JESÚS VERAS	PRM	PRM	Santo Domingo	2
JOSÉ FRANCISCO A. A. SANTANA SURIEL	PRM	PRM	Santo Domingo	2
HERIBERTO; ARACENA MONTILLA	FP	FP	Santo Domingo	3
JUAN JOSÉ; ROJAS FRANCO	DHP	PRM	Santo Domingo	3
YSABEL; DE LA CRUZ JAVIER	PLD	PLD	Santo Domingo	3
CARLOS JOSÉ; GIL RODRÍGUEZ	PLD	PLD	Santo Domingo	3
EDUARDO; HIDALGO ABREU	PLD	PLD	Santo Domingo	3
FRANKLIN; MARTÍNEZ	PLD	PLD	Santo Domingo	3
PEDRO JULIO; ALCÁNTARA	PRM	PRM	Santo Domingo	3
ALEXIS ISAAC; JIMÉNEZ GONZÁLEZ	PRM	PRM	Santo Domingo	3
JOSÉ MOISÉS; ORTIZ LÓPEZ	PRM	PRM	Santo Domingo	3
DULCE MERCEDES; QUIÑONES	PRM	PRM	Santo Domingo	3
MARÍA ELISA; SUÁREZ ALCALÁ	PRM	PLD	Santo Domingo	3
MIGUEL ALBERTO; BOGAERT MARRA	SDIB	FP	Santo Domingo	4
AQUILINO; SERRATA UCETA	FP	PLD	Santo Domingo	4
ANA MARÍA; PEÑA RAPOSO	PLD	PLD	Santo Domingo	4
IGNACIO; ARACENA	PRM	PRM	Santo Domingo	4
ELÍAS; BÁEZ DE LOS SANTOS	PRM	PRM	Santo Domingo	4
EDUVIGES MARÍA; BAUTISTA GOMERA	PRM	PRM	Santo Domingo	4
LUIS RAFAEL; SÁNCHEZ ROSARIO	PRM	PRM	Santo Domingo	4
DOMINGO EUSEBIO; DE LEÓN MASCARO	PLD	PLD	Santo Domingo	5
JESÚS; MARTÍNEZ ALBERTY	PLD	PLD	Santo Domingo	5
GETRUDE; RAMÍREZ CABRAL	PLD	PLD	Santo Domingo	5
ALEXÁNDER JAVIER; CUEVAS	PRM	PRM	Santo Domingo	5
CÉSAR SANTIAGO; RUTINEL DOMÍNGUEZ	PRM	PRM	Santo Domingo	5
JESÚS MANUEL; SÁNCHEZ MARTÍNEZ	PRM	PRM	Santo Domingo	5
RUBÉN DARÍO; MALDONADO DÍAZ	FP	FP	Santo Domingo	6
ENRIQUETA; ROJAS JAVIER	FP	PLD	Santo Domingo	6
EMMANUEL; MORALES PAULINO	PLD	PLD	Santo Domingo	6
SÓCRATES; PÉREZ LORENZO	PLD	PLD	Santo Domingo	6
DAMARYS; VÁSQUEZ CASTILLO	PLD	PLD	Santo Domingo	6
BETTY; GERÓNIMO SANTANA	PRM	PRM	Santo Domingo	6
MELVIN ALEXIS; LARA MELO	PRM	PRM	Santo Domingo	6
DIÓMEDES OMAR; ROJAS	PRM	PRM	Santo Domingo	6
LUCRECIA; SANTANA LEYBA	PRM	PRM	Santo Domingo	6
DOLORES EMILIA; FERMÍN BELTRÁN DE DURÁN	PLD	PLD	Valverde	-
JOSÉ FRANCISCO; LÓPEZ CHÁVEZ	PRM	PRM	Valverde	-
GUSTAVO ADOLFO; RODRÍGUEZ ESPINA	PRM	PRM	Valverde	-
KENIA FELICIA; BIDÓ PARRA DE DELL’AQUILA	PRM	PRM	Overseas Deputy, Electoral District 1	1
SERVIA AUGUSTA; FAMILIA ECHABARRÍA	PRM	PRM	Overseas Deputy, Electoral District 1	1
NORBERTO; RODRÍGUEZ VÁSQUEZ	PRM	PRM	Overseas Deputy, Electoral District 1	1
RAMÓN MARÍA; CEBALLO MARTES	PRM	PRM	Overseas Deputy, Electoral District 2	2
ADELIS DE JESÚS; OLIVARES ORTEGA	PRM	PRM	Overseas Deputy, Electoral District 2	2
LILY GERMANIA; FLORENTINO ROSARIO	PRM	PRM	Overseas Deputy, Electoral District 3	3
JULIO CÉSAR; LÓPEZ PEÑA	PRM	PRM	Overseas Deputy, Electoral District 3	3
PEDRO ANTONIO; MARTÍNEZ MORONTA	ALPAÍS	PRM	At-large	-
JUAN DIONICIO; RODRÍGUEZ RESTITUYO	BF	DHP	At-large	-
MIGUEL ÁNGEL; DE LOS SANTOS FIGUEROA	PCR	PCR	At-large	-
RADHAMÉS; CAMACHO CUEVAS	PLD	PLD	At-large	-
ELÍAS; WESSIN CHÁVEZ	PQDC	PRSC	At-large	-

== Party strengths in the Chamber of Deputies ==
The following table shows the composition of the Chamber of Deputies at the start of the most recent legislative periods by Electoral List (this list excludes the National Deputies and the Overseas Deputies for the elections before 2016)

Party	1998	2002	2006	2010	2016	2020	2024
Dominican Revolutionary Party (PRD)	83	74	60	73	0	3	1
Dominican Liberation Party (PLD)	49	41	96	102	127	75	13
Modern Revolutionary Party (PRM)	–	–	–	–	47	90	134
Social Christian Reformist Party (PRSC)	17	35	22	3	13	6	4
Institutional Social Democratic Bloc (BIS)	0	0	0	0	1	1	0
Quisqueyano Christian Democratic Party (PQDC)	0	0	0	0	1	0	1
Country Alliance (ALPAÍS)	–	–	–	–	1	2	1
People's Force (FP)	–	–	–	–	–	4	27
Broad Front (FA)	–	–	–	–	–	3	0
Alliance for Democracy (APD)	–	–	–	–	–	2	0
Revolutionary Social Democratic Party (PRSD)	–	–	0	0	0	0	3
Christian People's Party (PPC)	–	–	–	–	–	1	0
Liberal Reformist Party (PLR)	–	–	–	–	–	1	1
Civic Renovation Party (PCR)	–	–	–	–	–	1	1
Dominican Humanist Party (PHD)	–	–	–	–	–	1	0
Dominicans for Change (DXC)	–	–	–	0	0	0	2
National Citizen Will Party (PNVC)	0	0	0	0	0	0	1
Christian Socialist Party (PSC)	–	–	–	–	–	–	1
Total	149	150	178	178	190	190	190

The following table shows the composition of the Chamber of Deputies at the start of the most recent legislative period (2020–2024) by individual party (this list includes the National Deputies and the Overseas Deputies)

Party	Seats
Modern Revolutionary Party (PRM)	86
Dominican Liberation Party (PLD)	66
Social Christian Reformist Party (PRSC)	5
Dominican Revolutionary Party (PRD)	3
Broad Front (FA)	3
People's Force (FP)	15
Country Alliance (ALPAIS)	2
Alliance for Democracy (APD)	2
Social Democratic Institutional Bloc (BIS)	1
Dominicans for Change (DXC)	2
Civic Renovation Party (PCR)	1
Dominican Humanist Party (PHD)	1
Liberal Reformist Party (PLR)	1
Quisqueyano Christian Democratic Party (PQDC)	1
Revolutionary Social Democratic Party (PRSD)	1
Total	190

The following table shows the composition of the Chamber of Deputies at the start of the legislative period 2016–2020 by individual party (this list includes the National Deputies and the Overseas Deputies)

Party	Seats
Dominican Liberation Party (PLD)	106
Modern Revolutionary Party (PRM)	43
Social Christian Reformist Party (PRSC)	17
Dominican Revolutionary Party (PRD)	16
Liberal Reformist Party (PLR)	3
Country Alliance (ALPAIS)	1
Broad Front (FA)	1
Alternative Democratic Movement (MODA)	1
Christian People's Party (PPC)	1
Quisqueyano Christian Democratic Party (PQDC)	1
Total	190

The following table shows the composition of the Chamber of Deputies at the start of the legislative period 2010–2016 by individual party (this list includes the National Deputies and the Overseas Deputies)

Party	Seats
Dominican Liberation Party (PLD)	96
Dominican Revolutionary Party (PRD)	77
Social Christian Reformist Party (PRSC)	11
National Progressive Force (FNP)	1
Christian People's Party (PPC)	1
Alternative Democratic Movement (MODA)	1*
Institutional Social Democratic Bloc (BIS)	1
Movement for Independence, Unity and Change (MIUCA)	1
Alliance for Democracy (APD)	1
Total	190

- In 2010, the deputy Virgilio Meran Valenzuela win his seat like a member of MODA, but due to personal political changes, the web page of the Chamber of Deputies of the Dominican Republic, list him like a PRD deputy. Moreover, the page not list MODA as a political party with some legislative representative.

== See also ==
- List of political parties in the Dominican Republic
- List of presidents of the Chamber of Deputies of the Dominican Republic
- Politics of the Dominican Republic
- Senate of the Dominican Republic
