= Ministry of Foreign Affairs (Dominican Republic) =

Government ministry of the Dominican Republic

Ministry of Foreign Affairs of the Dominican Republic
- Ministerio de Relaciones Exteriores de la República Dominicana (Spanish); MIREX
- Coat of arms of the Dominican Republic

- Current logo

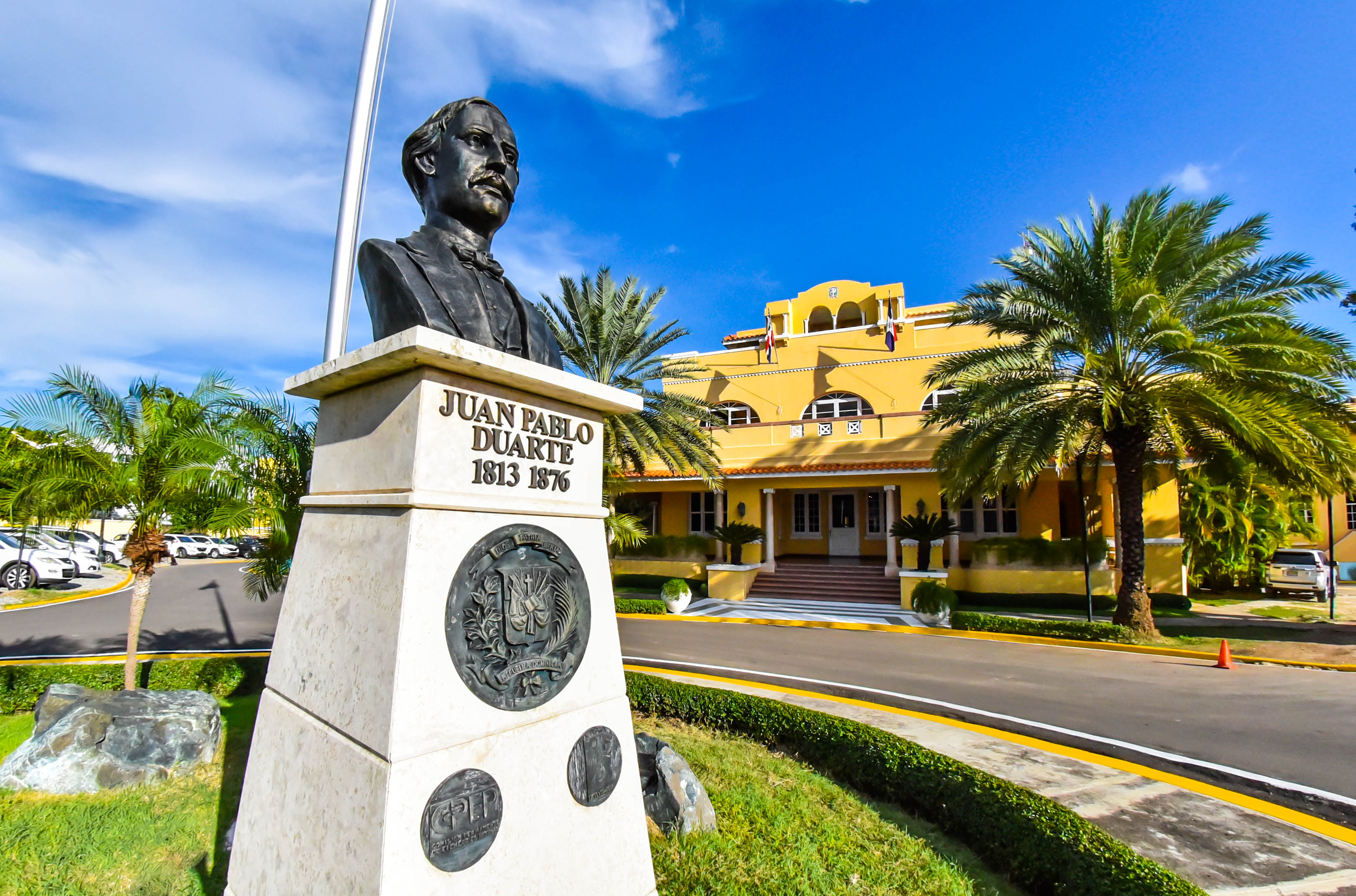
- Estancia San Geronimo, Ministry of Foreign Affairs of the Dominican Republic Headquarters (2016)

Agency overview
- Formed: April 4, 1874; 152 years ago
- Preceding agency: Secretary of State of Foreign Affairs (1874–2010)
- Type: Ministry; Ministry of Foreign Affairs; Ministries of the Dominican Republic
- Jurisdiction: Dominican Republic and its diplomatic missions
- Headquarters: 18°27′17″N 69°55′08″W Estancia San Geronimo, Avenida Independencia 752, Ciudad Universitaria, Santo Domingo, Distrito Nacional, 10103, Dominican Republic
- Employees: 2,294 (July 2026)
- Annual budget: RD$15,186,213,375.00 billion (FY 2026); RD$8,261,136,983.55 billion (2021)
- Minister responsible: Víctor "Ito" Bisonó, Minister of Foreign Affairs
- Deputy Ministers responsible: Francisco Caraballo Núñez, Deputy Minister of Bilateral Foreign Policy; Rubén Arturo Silié Valdez, Deputy Minister for Multilateral Foreign Policy; Vilma Inmaculada Arbaje de Contreras, Deputy Minister of Economic Affairs and International Cooperation; Opinio Díaz Vargas, Deputy Minister of Consular and Migration Affairs; Celinés Toribio, Deputy Minister for Dominican Communities Abroad; Ramón Antonio Pérez Fermín, Deputy Minister for Foreign Service Management and Operations
- Parent agency: Executive branch of the Government of the Dominican Republic
- Child agencies: See dependent agencies; See list of diplomatic missions
- Key document: Law No. 630-16 (in Spanish)
- Website: mirex.gob.do (in Spanish and English)

The Ministry of Foreign Affairs of the Dominican Republic (Spanish: Ministerio de Relaciones Exteriores de la República Dominicana, MIREX) also known as the Chancellery (Spanish: Cancillería), is the government institution in charge of foreign affairs. It's responsible of coordinating the foreign policy of the Dominican Republic along the President, in accordance with Article 128 of the Dominican Constitution.

It was created on 1874 as the Secretary of State of Foreign Affairs (Spanish: Secretaría de Estado de Relaciones Exteriores). Its headquarters are located at Santo Domingo.

The person in charge of the Ministry of Foreign Affairs is the Minister of Foreign Affairs, also known domestically as the Chancellor (Spanish: Canciller). Its current Minister is Víctor "Ito" Bisonó, since August 16, 2026.

== History ==
Since the early days of the Dominican Republic, the foreign affairs focused on securing a protectorate with a foreign power, be it Spain, France or United Kingdom. This led to president Pedro Santana signing the annexation of the Dominican Republic to Spain in 1861, becoming once again a Spanish colony.

It is during the Second Republic that the Secretary of State of Foreign Affairs (Spanish: Secretaría de Estado de Relaciones Exteriores) is created on 1874. During this period, some of the most distinguished men of the time were in charge of Dominican diplomacy, such as Ulises Espaillat, Pedro Francisco Bonó, Manuel de Jesús Galván, among others.

The Second Republic saw the interference of the United States into the politics and economy of the Dominican Republic. During the presidency of Ramón Cáceres, Dominican Customs were under direct supervision of the United States. The political instability of the time led to the United States occupation of the Dominican Republic between 1916 and 1924.

The Third Republic was characterized by the dictatorship of Rafael Trujillo. The Chancellery was under the control of the regime. The dictator himself occupied the position of Chancellor in 1938 and 1953.

In 1945, the Dominican Republic was one of the founding members of the United Nations. Ambassador Minerva Bernardino, first female diplomat of the Dominican Republic, signed the Charter of the United Nations in name of the country. It is also one of the founding members of the Organization of American States since 1948.

During the Fourth Republic, the country has been more actively involved in foreign affairs, particularly within the Caribbean region.

With the 2010 Constitutional reform, the office became the Ministry of Foreign Affairs (Spanish: Ministerio de Relaciones Exteriores) with Decree no. 56–10.

== Internal structure ==
As all other Ministries of the Dominican Republic, the Ministry of Foreign Affairs is subdivided into viceministries. These are:

- Viceministry of Bilateral Foreign Policy
- Viceministry of Multilateral Foreign Policy
- Viceministry of Economic Matters and International Cooperation
- Viceministry of Consular Matters and Migration
- Viceministry of Dominican Communities Abroad

Other offices of lower rank are:

- State Ceremonial and Protocol Office
- Specialized Diplomacy Office
- Borders and Limits Office
- Special Passport Department

== Dependent agencies ==
Some offices with a special link with the Ministry are:

- General Passport Office (DGP) (Spanish: Dirección General de Pasaportes)
- National Council for Borders (CNF) (Spanish: Consejo Nacional de Fronteras)
- Institute of Dominicans Abroad (INDEX) (Spanish: Instituto de Dominicanos y Dominicanas en el Exterior)
- Institute Dr. Eduardo Latorre Rodríguez of Higher Education on Diplomatic and Consular Training (INESDYC) (Spanish: Instituto de Educación Superior en Formación Diplomática y Consular Dr. Eduardo Latorre Rodríguez)

== List of ambassadors of the Dominican Republic ==
Reference.

- List of ambassadors of the Dominican Republic to Chile
- List of ambassadors of the Dominican Republic to China
- List of ambassadors of the Dominican Republic to Peru
- List of ambassadors of the Dominican Republic to the United States
- List of ambassadors of the Dominican Republic to the Holy See

== Evolution of the ministry's logo ==
2012–2020 (under the presidency of Danilo Medina)

2020–present (under the presidency of Luis Abinader)

== See also ==
- Foreign relations of the Dominican Republic
- List of diplomatic missions of the Dominican Republic
- List of diplomatic missions in the Dominican Republic
- Visa policy of the Dominican Republic
- Visa requirements for Dominican Republic citizens
- Dominican Republic passport
