= Dominican Republic passport =

Passport issued to Dominican Republic citizens

Dominican passport; Pasaporte dominicano
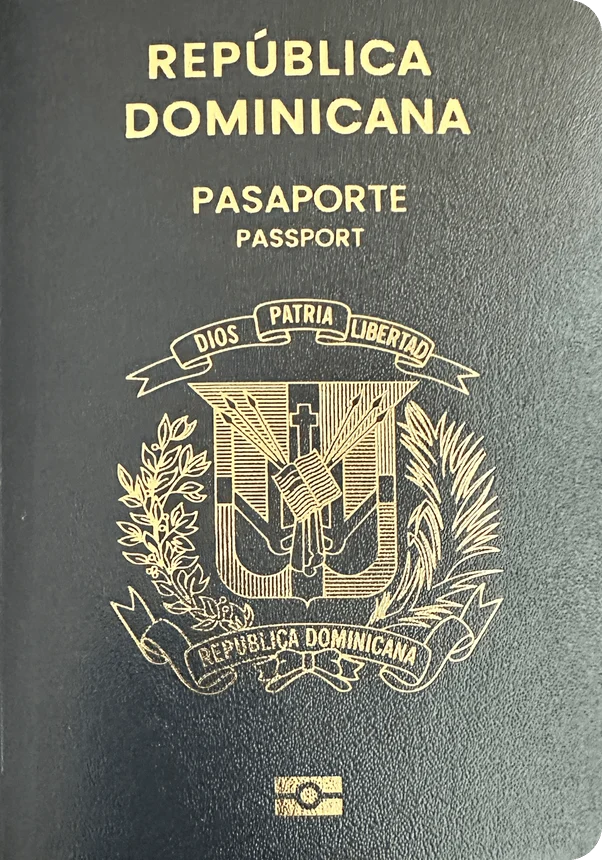
- Front cover of a current Dominican Republic biometric passport since 2026 (with chip)

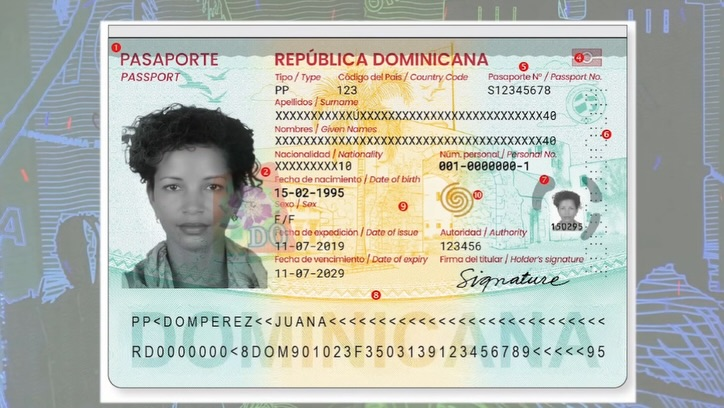
- The polycarbonate biodata page of the current Dominican Republic biometric passport
- Type: Passport
- Issued by: Dominican Republic: Dirección General de Pasaportes (DGP) (English: General Passport Office); Abroad: Embassies, Consulates General, Honorary Consulates and Honorary Vice-Consulates of the Dominican Republic
- First issued: 1848 (first version); 1934 (standard); 1997 (machine-readable passport); February 2026 (biometric passports)
- In circulation: 3.4 millions (2026)
- Purpose: Identification & travel document
- Valid in: All Countries
- Eligibility: Dominican Republic citizenship
- Expiration: Valid for 10 years for adults and 5 years for minors under the age of 18, from the date of issuance
- Cost: List: (Dominican Republic) Dirección General de Pasaportes (DGP): (English: General Passport Office); RD$6,700 (≈ US$109.16, October 2026) (normal adults); RD$6,700 (≈ US$109.16, October 2026) (normal minors); RD$10,700 (≈ US$174.40, October 2026) (VIP adults); RD$10,700 (≈ US$174.40, October 2026) (VIP minors)
- Website: www.pasaportes.gob.do (in Spanish) servicios360.mirex.gob.do/pasaportes-diplomaticos-y-u-oficiales/ (for dominican diplomats & officials)

The Dominican Republic (Dominican) passport (Spanish: Pasaporte dominicano) are issued to citizens of the Dominican Republic to travel outside the country and for identification. Along with Cuba and Haiti, the Dominican Republic passport is considered one of the weakest passports in Latin America for traveling as according to the 2026 Henley Passport Index, holders of a Dominican Republic passport are only able to visit 73 (of 196) countries without a visa, ranking it 67th globally in terms of global travel freedom (tied with Lesotho).

The Dominican Republic has transitioned to a biometric passport in 2026.

== History ==
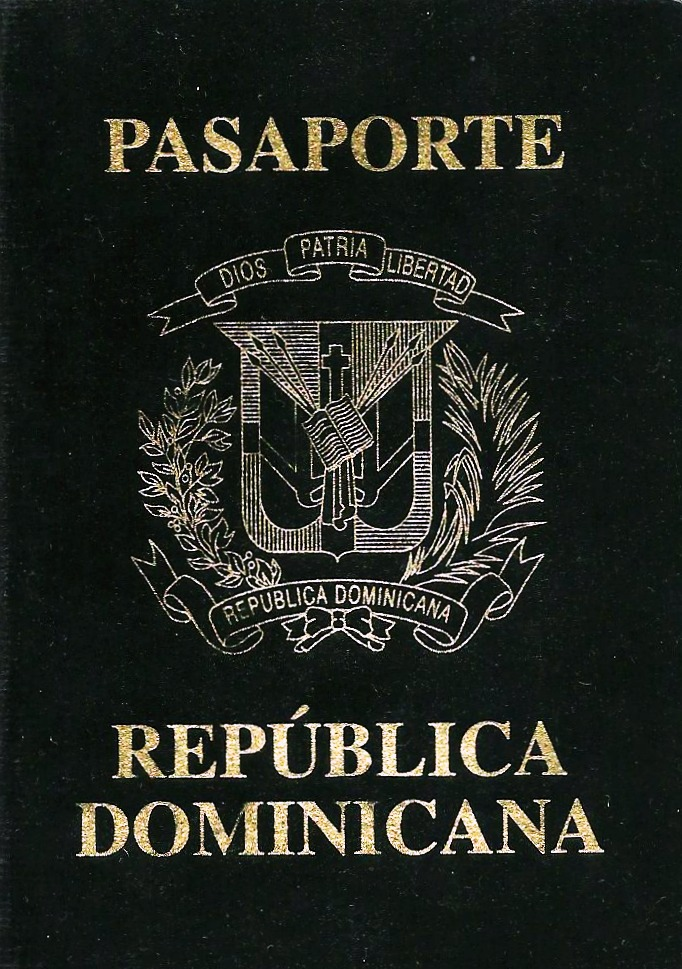
Older version of the Dominican Republic Passport

Dominican Republic passports were originally black until 2019, where they would become dark blue. In 2026, The Dominican Republic would officially roll out biometric passports for the first time.

== Physical appearance ==
Dominican Republic passports are dark blue, with the Dominican Republic Coat of Arms in the center of the passport, and the name of the country "República Dominicana" written on the top. The word "Pasaporte" is printed below the country name with the English version printed under it.

=== Data page ===
Every passport contains a biographical information page and a signature page.

- Photo of passport holder
- Type
- Country Code (DOM)
- Passport no.
- Surnames
- Given names
- Nationality
- Date of birth
- Sex
- Date of issue
- Date of expiry
- Fingerprint

=== Languages ===
The 2026 version of the Dominican Republic passport is mainly printed in Spanish, which is the country's official language. Key data fields such as Passport, Surname, Given Names, and Nationality are also printed in English and French.

=== Passport message ===
Passport messages are found in almost every passport, as they are used to identity the bearer of a citizen of the issuing country, and to be given necessary transit, assistance, and protection.

in Spanish:

El Gobierno de República Dominicana solicita a las autoridades nacionales e internacionales brindar al titular de este documento, las facilidades para su normal tránsito, asistencia, y proteccion necesaria, asi como las debidas consideraciones en los casos que asi lo ameriten.

in English:

The Government of the Dominican Republic requests all national and foreign authorities to provide the holder of this document with the necessary facilities for normal transit, assistance, and necessary protection, as well as due consideration in cases where it is warranted.

in French:

Le Gouvernement de la République Dominicaine demande aux autorités nationales et étrangères de fournir au titularie de ce document les facilites necessaries au transit normal, l'assistance et la protection, ainsi que la considération qui lui est due dans les cas où cela est justifié.

and in Portuguese:

O Governo da República Dominicana solicita ás autoridades nacionais e internacionais que proporcionem ao titular deste documento as facilidades necessárias para o trânsito normal, assistência e proteção indispensaveis, bem como as devidas considerações nos casos em que se justifique.

== Visa requirements ==
As of October 2026, Dominican Republic citizens had visa-free or visa on arrival access to 73 countries and territories, ranking the Dominican Republic passport 67th (tied with Lesotho) in terms of travel freedom, according to the Henley visa restrictions index.

== See also ==
- Visa requirements for Dominican Republic citizens
- Dominican Republic nationality law
- Dominicana passport information on PRADO
- National Identity Card (Cédula)
- List of passports
