= List of ambassadors of the Dominican Republic to China =

Coordinates: 25.117230°N 121.524103°E

Ambassador of the Dominican Republic to the People's Republic of China
- Embajador de la República Dominicana en la República Popular China
- Coat of arms of the Dominican Republic

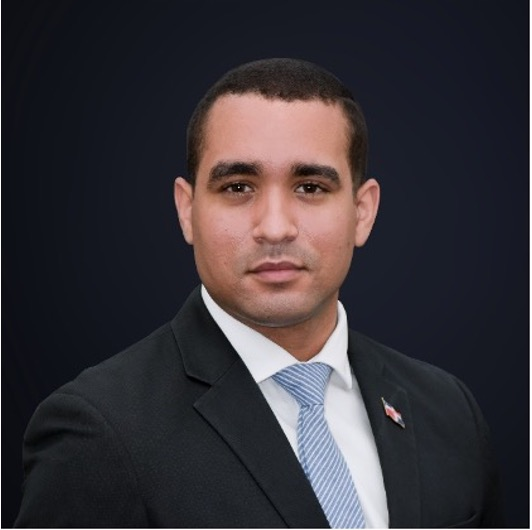
- Incumbent; José Julio Gómez since February 5, 2025
- Ministry of Foreign Affairs of the Dominican Republic; Embassy of the Dominican Republic in the People's Republic of China
- Style: His/Her Excellency (formal); Mr./Madam Ambassador (informal)
- Type: Head of mission
- Reports to: Minister of Foreign Affairs of the Dominican Republic
- Residence: Beijing
- Seat: Embassy of the Dominican Republic in the People's Republic of China
- Nominator: President of the Dominican Republic
- Appointer: President of the Dominican Republic; with Senate advice and consent
- Term length: At the pleasure of the president
- Inaugural holder: Leonte Guzmán Sánchez
- Formation: October 8, 1946 (80 years ago)
- Salary: US$5,000 (monthly)
- Website: chn.mirex.gob.do

The Ambassador of the Dominican Republic to the People's Republic of China is the official representative of the government in Santo Domingo to the government in Beijing.

- In July 2004, Taiwan was assured by the Dominican Republic that it would not switch its diplomatic recognition from Taipei to Beijing, even though it had established business ties with China.
- When Leonel Fernández was president-elect, he told Taiwan's ambassador that the new government will continue to recognize Taiwan.
- China opened a commercial liaison office in the Dominican Republic, but the long-standing friendship between Taiwan and the Dominican Republic will remain unchanged, but the D.R. will have commercial ties with China.

== List of representatives ==
| Diplomatic agrément/Diplomatic accreditation | Ambassador | Observations | List of presidents of the Dominican Republic | List of premiers of the Republic of China | Term end |
|---|---|---|---|---|---|
| 1946 | Leonte Guzmán Sánchez | Dominican Republic In March, 1947 Huang Yun-ssu was appointed Minister to the Dominican Republic. The Dominican Minister to China, Dr. Leonte Guzmán Sanchez, arrived in China and presented his credentials in October, 1946. 1952 El licenciado Leonte 'Guzmán Sánchez, Enviado Extraordinario y Ministro Plenipotenciario de la República en China, queda nombrado Enviado Extraordinario y Ministro Plenipotenciario de la República en el Japón. | Rafael Leónidas Trujillo Molina | Chiang Kai-shek | |
| 1964 | Jose Villanueva Garmendia | (1920-1987) Sep 16, 1971 - El Embajador de la República Dominicana, JOSE VILLANUEVA 20 — Jose Villanueva, outgoing Dominican ambassador to the Republic of China, left for his new post in Israel. | Donald Reid Cabral | Yen Chia-kan | 1971 |
| 1971 | Adolfo Rafael Camarena | Embajador de la República Dominicana Adolfo R. Camarena y el Embajador de la República Dominicana en Taipei, Adolfo Rafael | Joaquín Balaguer | Yen Chia-kan | 1979 |
| 1982 | Tancredo Anselmo Duluc | | Salvador Jorge Blanco | Sun Yun-suan | |
| 1983 | Francisco Anselmo Guzman Acosta | | Salvador Jorge Blanco | Sun Yun-suan | |
| September 16, 1984 | Oscar Félix Peguero Hermida | | Salvador Jorge Blanco | Yu Kuo-hwa | |
| 1986 | José Manuel López Balaguer | | Salvador Jorge Blanco | Yu Kuo-hwa | September 1990 |
| October 1990 | Juan Julio Morales Rosa | | Joaquín Balaguer | Hau Pei-tsun | |
| March 1992 | Ciro Amaury Dargam Cruz | | Joaquín Balaguer | Hau Pei-tsun | |
| December 1994 | Leonardo Matos Berrido | | Joaquín Balaguer | Lien Chan | March 1997 |
| April 1997 | Víctor Manuel Sánchez Peña | | Leonel Fernández | Lien Chan | October 2000 |
| December 2000 | Miguel Angel Hernández Núñez | Dec 16, 2000 - Miguel Angel Hernández Núñez, nuevo embajador de República Dominicana, presentó copias de sus cartas credenciales a Tien Hung-mao, | Hipólito Mejía | Tang Fei | April 2003 |
| April 2003 | Carlos J. Guzman | | Leonel Fernández | Yu Shyi-kun | October 2004 |
| October 2004 | Victor Manuel Sanchez Pena | | Leonel Fernández | Yu Shyi-kun | June 2011 |
| July 2011 | Rafaela Alburquerque | Rafaela Alburquerque: 12.04.2017 - Tsai Ing-wen extended the invitation to Danilo Medina through the outgoing Dominican Republic ambassador to Taiwan, Rafaela Albuquerque, | Danilo Medina | Mao Chi-kuo | April 2017 |
| July 2017 | José Miguel Ángel Soto Jiménez | commercial liaison office in Beijing | Danilo Medina | Lin Chuan | May 2018 |
| May 1, 2018 | | The governments in Santo Domingo and Beijing established diplomatic relations. | Danilo Medina | Li Keqiang | August 2018 |
| September 10, 2018 | Leonte Guzmán Sánchez | | Danilo Medina | Li Keqiang | August 2018 |

- Dominican Republic–Taiwan relations
- China–Dominican Republic relations
