= List of ambassadors of the Dominican Republic to Chile =

Ambassador of the Dominican Republic to the Republic of Chile
- Embajador de la República Dominicana en la República de Chile
- Coat of arms of the Dominican Republic

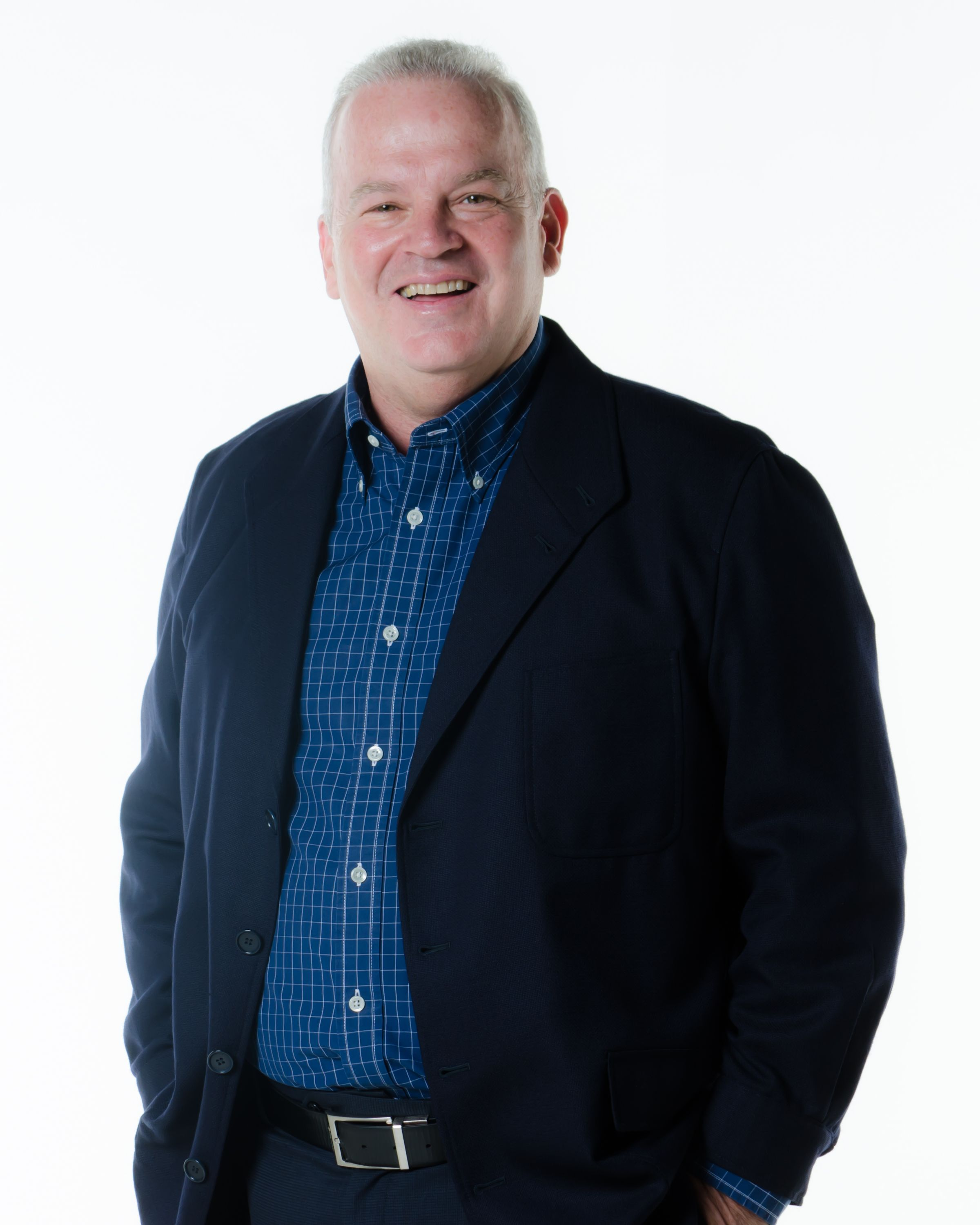
- Incumbent; Juan Cohen since December 23, 2024
- Ministry of Foreign Affairs of the Dominican Republic; Embassy of the Dominican Republic in Chile
- Style: His/Her Excellency (formal); Mr./Madam Ambassador (informal)
- Type: Head of mission
- Reports to: Minister of Foreign Affairs of the Dominican Republic
- Residence: Candelaria Goyenechea 4153, Vitacura, Santiago de Chile
- Seat: Embassy of the Dominican Republic in Chile
- Nominator: President of the Dominican Republic
- Appointer: President of the Dominican Republic; with Senate advice and consent
- Term length: At the pleasure of the president
- Salary: US$5,000 (monthly)
- Website: chl.mirex.gob.do

The Ambassador of the Dominican Republic to the Republic of Chile is in charge of the Dominican Republic's diplomatic mission to Chile.

The ambassador's residence is on Candelaria Goyenechea 4153, Vitacura in Santiago de Chile.

The current Ambassador, Juan Cohen, was appointed in December 23, 2024.

== List of ambassadors ==
This list is incomplete.

- Patricio Badía Lara (1994–?)
- Miguel Angel Velazquez Mainardi (2004–2005) (died in office)
- Cesar Medina (2005–2008)
- Pablo Arturo Maríñez (2009–2023)
