= Juan Cohen =

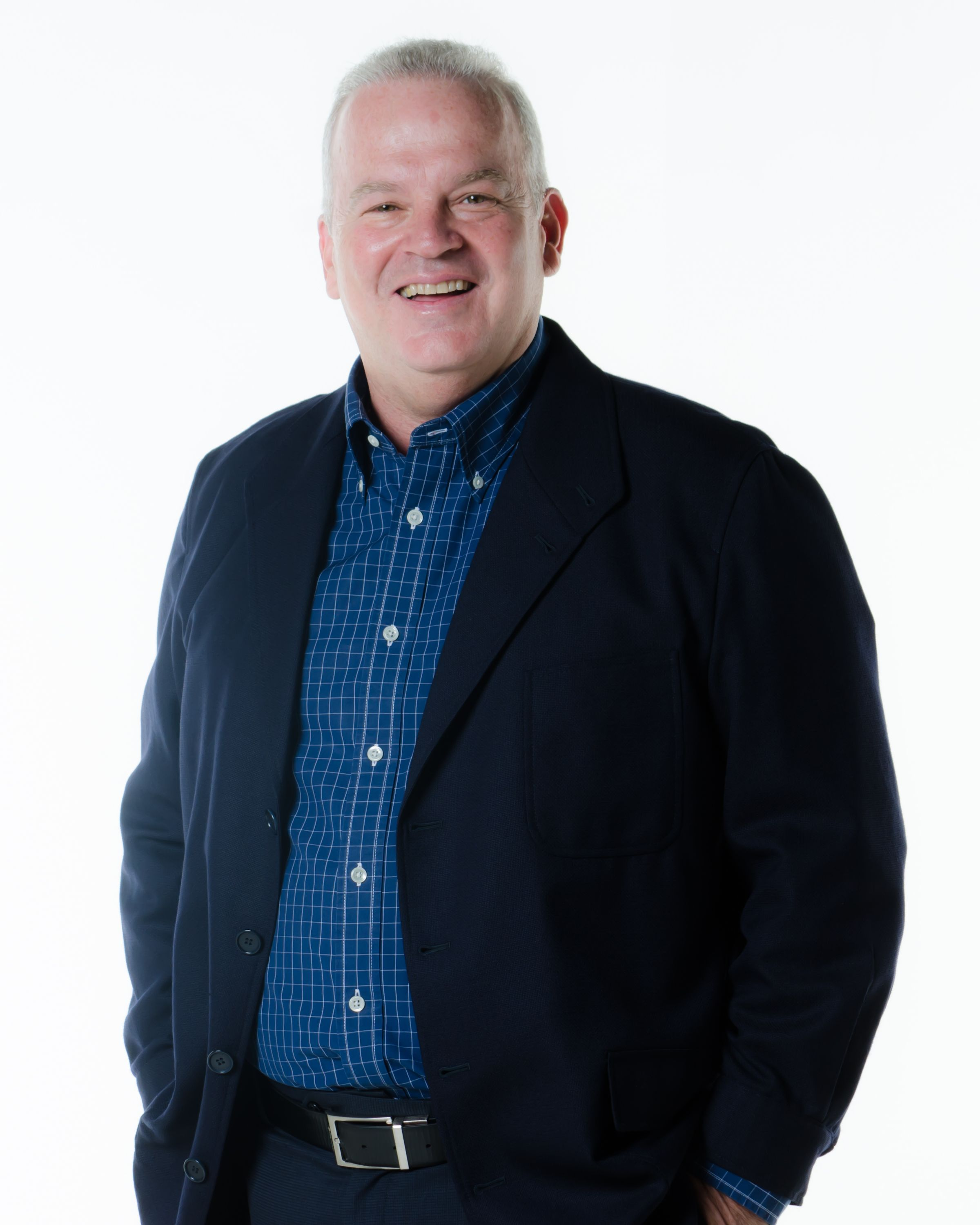

Ambassador of the Dominican Republic to the Republic of Chile
- Incumbent
- Assumed office December 23, 2024
- President: Luis Abinader
- Preceded by: Fausto Liz Quiñones

Member of the Central American Parliament
- In office 2010–2016

Personal details
- Born: 14 June 1960 (age 66) Santo Domingo, Dominican Republic
- Party: National Citizen Will Party (PNVC)
- Spouse: María Edelmira Marmolejos Jaar
- Parents: Juan Cohen Brea (father); Elsa Sander Gómez (mother)
- Education: Universidad Nacional Pedro Henríquez Ureña; Harvard University; Hult International Business School
- Occupation: Politician; businessman
- Profession: Economist

Juan Alberto Cohen Sander (14 June 1960,) is a Dominican economist, politician, businessman, and member of parliament. He was a presidential candidate of the Dominican Republic by the National Citizen Will Party (PNVC) for the general election 2016.

== Early life and education ==
Cohen was born on 14 June 1960 in Santo Domingo, Dominican Republic. He studied economics at Pedro Henríquez Ureña University. He earned a Master of Economics at the Pontifical Catholic University Mother and Teacher and studied political science at the University Pedro Henríquez Ureña.

He completed postgraduate degrees in finance at Hult International Business School (then known as Arthur D. Little School of Management) and business management at Harvard University.

== Career ==
Cohen served as president of the Commission of Tourism and deputy of the Central American Parliament from 2010–2016. In 2014, he was reelected as president of the National Citizen Will Party (PNVC) and in March 2015, was elected presidential candidate by the PNVC, in the XXXVII National Assembly Extraordinary.

== Additional affiliations ==
From 2008-2014, Cohen served as president of the Dominican Federation of Golf, where he executed important contributions to the development of golf in the Dominican Republic (2008–2014). He has also handled important media in the Dominican Republic.

== Personal life ==
Since 1985, Cohen has been married to María Marmolejos, with whom he has 3 children: Manuel Alberto, Juan Alberto and María de Dios.
