= Visa requirements for Dominican Republic citizens =

Administrative entry restrictions

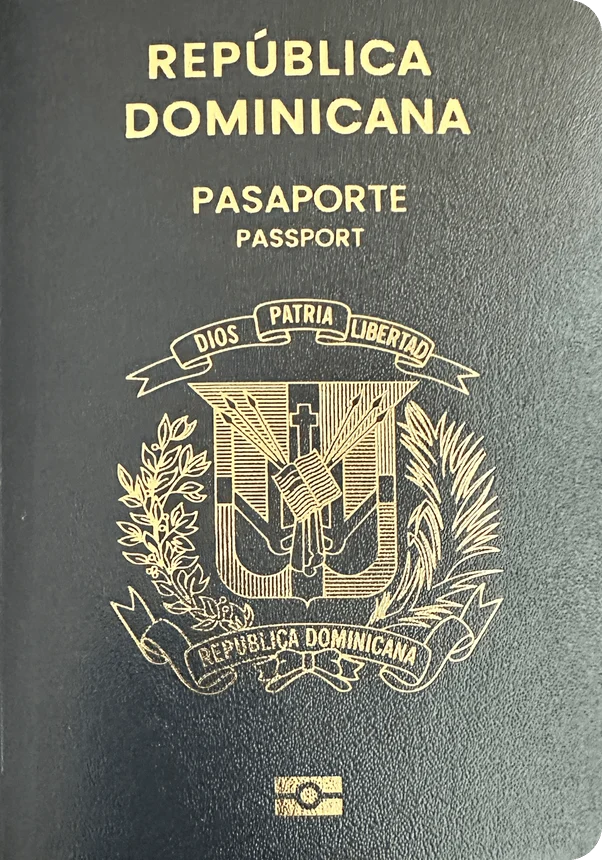
A Dominican Republic passport

Visa requirements for Dominican Republic citizens are administrative entry restrictions by the authorities of other states placed on citizens of the Dominican Republic. Along with Cuba and Haiti the Dominican republic passport is considered the weakest passport in Latin America for traveling. As of October 2026 the Dominican republic passport holders can visit 73 countries without visa or visa on arrival (tied with Lesotho) holding 67th position in the Henley Passport Index. Dominican Republic is among only a few Latin American countries such as Bolivia and Ecuador that still do not enjoy a visa - free regime with the European Union.

Recent changes:

Several countries have updated their entry requirements for Dominican citizens, including the introduction of visa-free travel or visa-on-arrival arrangements that are not yet reflected in some passport rankings. Examples frequently cited include Azerbaijan, Dominica, Kazakhstan, Mongolia, Panama, and visa on arrival in Namibia. If these changes are confirmed and included, the Dominican passport would provide access to approximately 78 countries and destinations, depending on how destinations are counted and the methodology used by each passport index,that means it is tied with, or ranked above, the Bolivian passport.

== Visa requirements ==
- Reference.

Country	Visa requirement	Allowed stay	Notes (excluding departure fees)
Afghanistan	eVisa	30 days	Visa is not required in case born in Afghanistan or can proof that one of their parents is a national of Afghanistan or born in Afghanistan.; e-Visa : Visitors must arrive at Kabul International (KBL).
Albania	eVisa		Visa is not required for holders of Schengen, US or UK visa or residence permits (max stay 90 days)
Algeria	Visa required		
Andorra	Visa required		No border checkpoints in Andorra, but visitor must visit France or Spain before reach Andorra thus Schengen Visa is required
Angola	Visa not required	30 days	
Antigua and Barbuda	eVisa		Visa waiver for passengers with valid visas issued by Canada, USA, UK, or Schengen Member State. Visa fee: USD-100, for max. of 30 days.
Argentina	Visa required		Visa waiver for passengers with a valid visa issued by the US, or Schengen Member State. Visa fee: USD-60, for max. of 90 days. To be obtained online at the DNM Migraciones Argentina.
Armenia	eVisa / Visa on arrival	120 days	Obtainable on arrival at Zvartnots International Airport or prior to travel online.
Australia	Visa required		May apply online (Online Visitor e600 visa).
Austria	Visa required		
Azerbaijan	Visa required		September 2026 Dominican republic and Azerbaijan signed a mutual visa exemption agreement for tourist purposes, 90 days in 180 days period.
Bahamas	eVisa		Bahamas tourist visa is not required for US or Canada Resident card holder for a stay up to 30 days.
Bahrain	eVisa		
Bangladesh	Visa on arrival	30 days	Not available at all entry points.
Barbados	Visa required		
Belarus	Visa required		Visas are issued on arrival at the Minsk International Airport if the support documents were submitted not later than 3 business days before expected date of arrival.
Belgium	Visa required		Transit without visa (TWOV) available.
Belize	Visa required		Visa waiver for passengers with multiple-entry valid visa or Permanent Resident Card issued by Canada, USA or Schengen Area, maximum for 30 days.
Benin	eVisa / Visa on arrival	30 days / 8 days	Must have an international vaccination certificate.
Bhutan	eVisa	90 days	Visa fee is 40 USD per person and visa application may be processed within 5 business days with duration of stay of 90 days.; e-Visa applicant is also subject to pay Sustainable Development Fee
Bolivia	Visa not required	90 days	
Bosnia and Herzegovina	Visa required		Visa waiver for passengers with valid visa or resident permit issued by USA or Schengen Member State.
Botswana	Visa not required	90 days	90 days within any year period
Brazil	Visa not required	60 days	
Brunei	Visa required		
Bulgaria	Visa required		
Burkina Faso	eVisa		
Burundi	Visa on arrival / eVisa	30 days	
Cambodia	eVisa / Visa on arrival	30 days	
Cameroon	eVisa		
Canada	Visa required		Visa not required for US permanent resident card Holders.
Cape Verde	Visa on arrival		Not available at all entry points.
Central African Republic	Visa required		
Chad	eVisa	90 days	
Chile	Visa required		Visa not required for max. stay of 90 days for holders of a valid visa issued by USA.
China	Visa required		Pre-arranged visa on arrival is available
Colombia	Visa not required	90 days	90 days – extendable up to 180-days stay within a one-year period
Comoros	Visa on arrival		
Republic of the Congo	Visa required		
Democratic Republic of the Congo	eVisa	90 days	
Costa Rica	Visa required		Visa waiver for passengers with multiple-entry valid visa issued by Canada or USA, maximum for 30 days.
Côte d'Ivoire	eVisa	90 days	
Croatia	Visa required		
Cuba	eVisa	90 days	
Cyprus	Visa required		
Czech Republic	Visa required		
Denmark	Visa required		
Djibouti	eVisa	31 days	
Dominica	Visa not required		Visa Exemptions: Passengers with a visa issued by Canada, USA, United Kingdom, or a Schengen Member State for a maximum stay of 6 months.
Ecuador	Visa not required	90 days	
Egypt	Visa on arrival	15 days	
El Salvador	Visa not required	6 months	
Equatorial Guinea	eVisa		
Eritrea	Visa required		.
Estonia	Visa required		
Eswatini	Visa required		
Ethiopia	eVisa	up to 90 days	eVisa holders must arrive via Addis Ababa Bole International Airport
Fiji	Visa required		
Finland	Visa required		
France	Visa required		Transit without visa (TWOV) available.
Gabon	eVisa		Electronic visa holders must arrive via Libreville International Airport.
Gambia	Visa not required		Dominicans will need a clearance to enter into Gambia.; Must obtain an entry clearance from the Gambian Immigration prior to travel
Georgia	Visa not required	1 year	
Germany	Visa required		
Ghana	Visa required		
Greece	Visa required		
Grenada	Visa not required	90 days	
Guatemala	Visa required		Visa requirement effective on 15 February 2023
Guinea	eVisa	90 days	
Guinea-Bissau	eVisa / Visa on arrival	90 days	
Guyana	Visa not required	30 days	
Haiti	Visa required		Visa not required for max. stay of 3 Months for Holders of a valid visa issued by Canada, the USA or a Schengen Member State.
Honduras	Visa not required	30 days	
Hungary	Visa required		
Iceland	Visa required		
India	e-Visa	60 days	e-Visa holders must arrive via 32 designated airports (Note: Ahmedabad; Amritsar; Bagdogra; Bengaluru; Bhubaneswar; Chandigarh; Chennai; Coimbatore; Delhi; Gaya; Goa-Dabolim; Goa-Manohar; Guwahati; Hyderabad; Indore; Jaipur; Kannur; Kochi; Kolkata; Kozhikode; Lucknow; Madurai; Mangaluru; Mumbai; Nagpur; Port Blair; Pune; Surat; Thiruvananthapuram; Tiruchirappalli; Varanasi; Visakhapatnam) or 5 designated seaports. (Note: Chennai; Cochin; Mormugao; Mumbai; Mangalore); An Indian e-Tourist Visa may only be obtained twice within 1 calendar year.; Foreigners of Pakistani origin or who hold a Pakistani Passport are not eligible for an e-Visa. Foreigners who are not Pakistani nationals, but whose parents or grandparents (either paternal or maternal) were born in, or were permanent residents in Pakistan, are also not eligible for an e-Visa.
Indonesia	Visa required		
Iran	eVisa/Visa on arrival	30 days	
Iraq	eVisa	30 days	
Ireland	Visa required		
Israel	Electronic Travel Authorization	90 days	
Italy	Visa required		
Jamaica	Visa not required	180 days	Since March 4, 2025: .
Japan	Visa not required	90 days	
Jordan	eVisa/Visa on arrival	30 days	Conditions apply. Not available at all entry points.
Kazakhstan	Visa Free	60 days	National Congress of The Dominican Republic Approves 60 days visa free agreement with Kazakhstan.
Kenya	Electronic Travel Authorisation	90 days	Applications can be submitted up to 90 days prior to travel and must be submitted at least 3 days in advance.; eTA fee is USD 32.50.; eTA is good for single entry, but visitors who leave Kenya to other EAC countries may re-enter provided that their eTA is still valid; Proof of reservation at the hotel where visitors plan to stay is required (if staying with friends, an invitation letter is also acceptable).; Yellow fever vaccination certificate is required if coming from endemic countries.; Can also be entered on an East Africa tourist visa issued by Rwanda or Uganda.
Kiribati	Visa not required	90 days	
North Korea	Visa required		
South Korea	K-ETA	90 days	visitor must obtain a K-ETA before their departure to South Korea
Kuwait	Visa required		
Kyrgyzstan	eVisa		Electronic visa holders must arrive via Manas International Airport or Osh Airport or through land crossings with China (at Irkeshtam and Torugart), Kazakhstan (at Ak-jol, Ak-Tilek, Chaldybar, Chon-Kapka), Tajikistan (at Bor-Dobo, Kulundu, Kyzyl-Bel) and Uzbekistan (at Dostuk).
Laos	eVisa / Visa on arrival	30 days	18 (Note: Savannakhet Airport; Lanetoui - Mengkang (China); Meuangmom - Wan Pong (Myanmar); Banvang - Ban Khok Phai (Thailand); Namngeun - Huay Kon (Thailand); Paksan - Bueng Kan (Thailand); Paktaphan - Pak Saeng (Thailand); Pangmon - Ban Huak (Thailand); Phoudou (Thailand); Dak ta ock - Nam Giang (Vietnam); La Lai (Vietnam); Namkan (Vietnam); Namphao - Cau Treo (Vietnam); Namsoy - Na Meo (Vietnam); Naphao - Cha Lo (Vietnam); Pahang - Long Sap (Vietnam); Panghok - Tây Trang (Vietnam); Phoukeua - Bo Y (Vietnam)) of the 33 border crossings are only open to regular visa holders.; e-Visa may be used to enter Laos through the Luang Prabang, Pakse and Vientiane international airports, 3 Thai-Lao Friendship Bridges (Note: Vientiane (Friendship Bridge 1); Savannakhet (Friendship Bridge 2); Bokeo (Friendship Bridge 4)), in Boten (road and railroad), and in Vientiane (at Khamsavath railway station).; Visa on arrival is available at the Luang Prabang, Pakse and Vientiane international airports, 4 Thai-Lao Friendship Bridges (Note: Vientiane (Friendship Bridge 1); Savannakhet (Friendship Bridge 2); Khammouane (Friendship Bridge 3); Bokeo (Friendship Bridge 4)) and 7 border crossings. (Note: Nongnokkheane - Trapeang Kriel (Cambodia); Boten - Bo han (China); Golden Triangle/Samliemkham (Thailand); Khamsavath railway station (Thailand); Namheuang - Ban Na Kraseng (Thailand); Vang tao - Chongmek (Thailand); Dansavan - Lao Bảo (Vietnam))
Latvia	Visa required		
Lebanon	Free visa on arrival	1 month	1 month extendable for 2 additional months; granted free of charge at Beirut International Airport or any other port of entry if there is no Israeli visa or seal, holding a telephone number, an address in Lebanon, and a non refundable return or circle trip ticket.
Lesotho	eVisa	14 days	
Liberia	eVisa	30 days	
Libya	eVisa	30 days	
Liechtenstein	Visa required		
Lithuania	Visa required		
Luxembourg	Visa required		
Madagascar	eVisa / Visa on arrival	90 days	
Malawi	eVisa / Visa on arrival	30 days	
Malaysia	Visa not required	30 days	
Maldives	Free visa on arrival	30 days	
Mali	Visa required		
Malta	Visa required		
Marshall Islands	Visa required		
Mauritania	eVisa		
Mauritius	Visa on arrival	60 days	
Mexico	Visa required		No visa required for those holding a valid visa or residence issued by the United States, Canada, Japan, Colombia, Chile, or Schengen.
Micronesia	Visa not required	30 days	
Moldova	eVisa		visa waiver for passenger with a valid residence permit, a valid 'C'-type, or a valid 'D'-type visa issued by a Schengen member state or Ireland
Monaco	Visa required		
Mongolia	Visa not required		Dominican Republic and Mongolia Sign Visa Exemption Agreement. Not in effect yet
Montenegro	Visa required		Visa waiver for passengers with a valid visa issued by Canada, USA, UK or a Schengen Member State for 30 days.
Morocco	Visa Not required	60 days	
Mozambique	eVisa / Visa on arrival	30 days	
Myanmar	Visa required		
Namibia	eVisa		
Nauru	Visa required		
Nepal	eVisa / Visa on arrival	90 days	
Netherlands	Visa required		
New Zealand	Visa required		Holders of an Australian Permanent Resident Visa or Resident Return Visa may be granted a New Zealand Resident Visa on arrival permitting indefinite stay (pursuant to the Trans-Tasman Travel Arrangement), subject to meeting character requirements and obtaining an Electronic Travel Authority prior to departure.
Nicaragua	Visa not required	90 days	
Niger	Visa required		
Nigeria	eVisa	90 days	
North Macedonia	Visa required		Visa is not required for holders of a valid US, UK, Canada or a Schengen member State visa, maximum for 15 days.
Norway	Visa required		
Oman	Visa required		
Pakistan	Online Visa		
Palau	Free visa on arrival	30 days	
Panama	Visa not required	90 days	
Papua New Guinea	eVisa	60 days	May apply for an e-visa under the type of "Tourist – Own Itinerary".
Paraguay	Visa not required	60 days	
Peru	Visa not required	60 days	
Philippines	Visa not required	30 days	
Poland	Visa required		
Portugal	Visa required		
Qatar	Visa not required	90 days	
Romania	Visa required		
Russia	Visa not required	60 days	60 days within any 180 day period
Rwanda	eVisa / Visa on arrival	30 days	May apply online.; Can also be entered on an East Africa tourist visa issued by Kenya or Uganda
Saint Kitts and Nevis	eVisa		
Saint Lucia	Visa required		
Saint Vincent and the Grenadines	Visa required		
Samoa	Visa not required	60 days	
San Marino	Visa required		
São Tomé and Príncipe	eVisa		
Saudi Arabia	Visa required		
Senegal	Visa on arrival	90 days	
Serbia	Visa required		Visa not required for holders of Schengen, US or UK visa or residence permits (max stay 90 days)
Seychelles	Free Visitor's Permit on arrival	3 months	
Sierra Leone	eVisa		
Singapore	Visa not required	30 days	
Slovakia	Visa required		
Slovenia	Visa required		
Solomon Islands	Free Visitor's permit on arrival	3 months	
Somalia	eVisa	30 days	
South Africa	Visa required		
South Sudan	eVisa	up to 6 months	Obtainable online; Visa fee: Single entry visa (US$100), 3 months multiple entry visa (US$200), 6 months multiple entry visa (US$350).; Printed visa authorization must be presented at the time of travel
Spain	Visa required		
Sri Lanka	Electronic Travel Authorization/ Visa on arrival	30 days	30 days extendable to 6 months.; The standard visitor visa allows a stay of 60 days within any 6-month period.; Visa fees (for Standard visitor visa): SAARC – US$35; Non SAARC – US$75; e-Visa categories will be charged an additional US$18.50 service fee.; If transiting from any of the Sri Lankan airports, An e-Visa is exempted (2 day transit period).
Sudan	Visa required		
Suriname	E-tourist card	90 days	Multiple entry eVisa is also available.
Sweden	Visa required		
Switzerland	Visa required		
Syria	eVisa		
Tajikistan	Visa not required	30 days	https://trektajikistan.com/entry-requirements-tajikistan/
Tanzania	eVisa / Visa on arrival	3 months	
Thailand	Visa not required	60 days	
Timor-Leste	Visa on arrival	30 days	Not available at all entry points.
Togo	eVisa	15 days	
Tonga	Visa required		
Trinidad and Tobago	Visa not required	90 days	
Tunisia	Visa required		
Turkey	eVisa	90 days	
Turkmenistan	Visa required		
Tuvalu	Visa on arrival	1 month	
Uganda	eVisa / Visa on arrival		Determined at the port of entry.
Ukraine	eVisa	30 days	
United Arab Emirates	eVisa	30 days	E-visas can be obtained.; May apply also using 'Smart service'.; A 96-hour transit visa can be obtained on arrival at Dubai (DXB).
United Kingdom	Visa required		
United States	Visa required		
Uruguay	Visa required		Visa not required for max. stay of 90 days for holders of a valid visa issued by USA or the United Kingdom.
Uzbekistan	Visa not required	30 days	
Vanuatu	Visa required		
Vatican City	Visa required		Open borders but de facto follows Italian visa policy.
Venezuela	Visa required		
Vietnam	eVisa	90 days	Phú Quốc without a visa for up to 30 days.
Yemen	Visa required		
Zambia	Visa not required	90 days	Visa free Starting on January 1, 2025
Zimbabwe	eVisa / Visa on arrival	30 days	

=== Dependent, Disputed, or Restricted territories ===
Visa requirements for Dominican Republic citizens for visits to various territories, disputed areas, partially recognised countries and restricted zones:

Visitor to	Visa requirement	Notes (excluding departure fees)
Africa
British Indian Ocean Territory	Special permit required	Special permit required.
Eritrea outside Asmara	Travel permit required	To travel in the rest of the country, a Travel Permit for Foreigners is required (20 Eritrean nakfa).
Ascension Island	eVisa	3 months within any year period
Saint Helena	eVisa	
Tristan da Cunha	Permission required	Permission to land required for 15/30 pounds sterling (yacht/ship passenger) for Tristan da Cunha Island or 20 pounds sterling for Gough Island, Inaccessible Island or Nightingale Islands.
(France) Réunion	Visa required	Schengen visa covers entry
Somaliland	Visa on arrival	30 days for 30 US dollars, payable on arrival.
Sudan	Travel permit required	All foreigners traveling more than 25 kilometres outside of Khartoum must obtain a travel permit.
(Sudan) Darfur	Travel permit required	Separate travel permit is required.
Asia
Hong Kong	Visa not required	30 days
Kazakhstan	Special permission required	Special permission required for the town of Baikonur and surrounding areas in Kyzylorda Oblast, and the town of Gvardeyskiy near Almaty.
(Iran) Kish Island	Visa not required	Visitors to Kish Island do not require a visa.
Macau	Visa on Arrival	
(Malaysia) Sabah and Sarawak	Visa required	These states have their own immigration authorities and passport is required to travel to them, however the same visa applies.
Maldives	Permission required	With the exception of the capital Malé, tourists are generally prohibited from visiting non-resort islands without the express permission of the Government of Maldives.
Palestine	Visa not required	Arrival by sea to Gaza Strip not allowed.
Taiwan	Visa not required	30 days
(Tajikistan) Gorno-Badakhshan Autonomous Province	OIVR permit required	OIVR permit required (15+5 Tajikistani Somoni) and another special permit (free of charge) is required for Lake Sarez.
(China) Tibet Autonomous Region	TTP required	Tibet Travel Permit required (10 US Dollars).
(United Nations) Korean Demilitarised Zone	Restricted zone.	
(United Nations) UNDOF Zone and Ghajar	Restricted zone.	
Yemen	Special permission required	Special permission needed for travel outside Sana'a or Aden. Also, a small fee is charged on a case-by-case basis.
Caribbean and North Atlantic
Anguilla	Visa required	Visa Exemptions: Passengers with a visa issued by Canada, USA or the United Kingdom for a maximum stay of 3 months.
Aruba	Visa required	Visa not required if holding a valid multiple-entry visa issued by Canada, USA or a Schengen Member State.
Bermuda	Visa required	Visa required, except for A max stay of 3 months for holders of a multiple-entry visa issued by Canada, USA or the United Kingdom, valid for at least 45 days beyond the period of intended stay in Bermuda.
(Netherlands) Bonaire, St. Eustatius and Saba	Visa required	Visa not required if holding a valid multiple-entry visa issued by Canada, USA or a Schengen Member State.
British Virgin Islands	Visa required	Visa not required if holding a valid multiple-entry visa issued by Canada, USA or a Schengen Member State valid for a minimum of 6 months on arrival. They must travel as tourists or on business for a maximum stay of 6 months.
Cayman Islands	Visa required	Visa not Required if you are a US, Canada or United Kingdom Resident and arrive directly from those countries.
Curacao	Visa required	Visa not required if holding a valid multiple-entry visa issued by Canada, USA or a Schengen Member State.
(France) French Guiana	Visa required	Schengen visa endorsed with "for French Guiana" covers entry
(France) French West Indies	Visa required	French West Indies refers to Martinique, Guadeloupe, Saint Martin and Saint Barthélemy. Schengen visa endorsed with "for French West Indies" covers entry
Greenland	Visa required	No visa required for holders of a Schengen member State visa.
Montserrat	Visa not required	6 months
Puerto Rico	Visa required	
Saint Pierre and Miquelon	Visa required	Not required for holders of a Schengen visa.
Sint Maarten	Visa required	Visa not required if holding a valid multiple-entry visa issued by Canada, USA or a Schengen Member State.
Turks and Caicos Islands	Visa required	Visa not required for holders of a valid visa issued by Canada, United Kingdom or the USA.
U.S. Virgin Islands	Visa required	
Europe
Abkhazia	Visa required	
Mount Athos	Special permit required	Special permit required (4 days: 25 euro for Orthodox visitors, 35 euro for non-Orthodox visitors, 18 euro for students). There is a visitors' quota: maximum 100 Orthodox and 10 non-Orthodox per day and women are not allowed.
Turkish Republic of Northern Cyprus	Visa not required	3 months
(United Nations) UN Buffer Zone in Cyprus	Access Permit required	Access Permit is required for travelling inside the zone, except Civil Use Areas.
Faroe Islands	Visa required	Schengen visa covers entry
(United Kingdom) Gibraltar	Visa required	UK Visa covers entry
Guernsey	Visa required	UK Visa covers entry
Isle of Man	Visa required	UK Visa covers entry
(Norway) Jan Mayen	Permit required	Permit issued by the local police required for staying for less than 24 hours and permit issued by the Norwegian police for staying for more than 24 hours.
Jersey	Visa required	UK Visa covers entry
Kosovo	Visa required	Schengen visa covers entry
Russia	Special authorization required	Several closed cities and regions in Russia require special authorisation.
South Ossetia	Visa not required	Multiple entry visa to Russia and three-day prior notification are required to enter South Ossetia.
(Norway) Svalbard	Visa not required	Unlimited period under Svalbard Treaty. No one requires a visa to enter Svalbard but practically its impossible to board a flight/ferry to Svalbard without entering Norway. So double entry Schengen visa would be required to go and come back from Svalbard to mainland Norway
Transnistria	Visa not required	Registration required after 24h.
Oceania
(Australia) Ashmore and Cartier Islands	Special authorisation required	Special authorisation required.
(France) Clipperton Island	Special permit required	Special permit required.
Cook Islands	Visa not required	31 days
(Fiji) Lau Province	Special permission required	Special permission required.
French Polynesia	Visa required	Schengen visa covers entry.
Guam	Visa required	
Niue	Visa on arrival	30 days
Pitcairn Islands	Visa not required	14 days visa free and landing fee US$35 or tax of US$5 if not going ashore.
United States Minor Outlying Islands	Special permits required	Special permits required for Baker Island, Howland Island, Jarvis Island, Johnston Atoll, Kingman Reef, Midway Atoll, Palmyra Atoll and Wake Island.
South America
Galápagos	Pre-registration required	Online pre-registration is required. Transit Control Card must also be obtained at the airport at the airport prior to departure.
South Atlantic and Antarctica
Falkland Islands	Visa required	UK visa covers entry.
South Georgia and the South Sandwich Islands	Permit required	Pre-arrival permit from the Commissioner required (72 hours/1 month for 110/160 pounds sterling).
Antarctica		Special permits required for British Antarctic Territory, French Southern and Antarctic Lands, Argentine Antarctica, (Australia) Australian Antarctic Territory, (Antártica Chilena Province) Chilean Antarctic Territory, (Australia) Heard Island and McDonald Islands, (Norway) Peter I Island, (Norway) Queen Maud Land, (New Zealand) Ross Dependency.

== Non-visa restrictions ==
=== Blank passport pages ===
Many countries require a minimum number of blank pages to be available in the passport being presented, typically one or two pages. Endorsement pages, which often appear after the visa pages, are not counted as being valid or available.

=== Vaccination ===
Cover of the new International Certificate of Vaccination issued by the Bureau of Quarantine in the Philippines since 2021

The African countries of Angola, Benin, Burkina Faso, Burundi, Cameroon, Central African Republic, Democratic Republic of the Congo, Republic of the Congo, Côte d'Ivoire, Gabon, Ghana, Guinea-Bissau, Mali, Niger, Sierra Leone and Togo, South Sudan and Uganda, along with French Guiana in South America, require all incoming passengers older than nine months to one year, to have a current International Certificate of Vaccination or Prophylaxis.

Some other countries require vaccination only if the passenger is coming from an infected area or has visited one recently or has transited for 12 hours in those countries: Algeria, Botswana, Cabo Verde, Chad, Djibouti, Egypt, Eswatini, Ethiopia, Gambia, Ghana, Guinea, Lesotho, Libya, Equatorial Guinea, Eritrea, Madagascar, Malawi, Mauritania, Mauritius, Mozambique, Namibia, Nigeria, Papua New Guinea, Seychelles, Somalia, South Africa, Sudan, Tunisia, Uganda, Tanzania, Zambia and Zimbabwe.

=== Passport validity length ===
Very few countries, such as Paraguay, just require a valid passport on arrival.

However many countries and groupings now require only an identity card – especially from their neighbours. Other countries may have special bilateral arrangements that depart from the generality of their passport validity length policies to shorten the period of passport validity required for each other's citizens or even accept passports that have already expired (but not been cancelled).

Some countries, such as Japan, Ireland and the United Kingdom, require a passport valid throughout the period of the intended stay.

In the absence of specific bilateral agreements, countries requiring passports to be valid for at least 6 more months on arrival include Afghanistan, Algeria, Anguilla, Bahrain, Bhutan, Botswana, British Virgin Islands, Brunei, Cambodia, Cameroon, Cape Verde, Cayman Islands, Central African Republic, Chad, Comoros, Costa Rica, Côte d'Ivoire, Curaçao, Ecuador, Egypt, El Salvador, Equatorial Guinea, Fiji, Gabon, Guinea Bissau, Guyana, Haiti, India, Indonesia, Iran, Iraq, Israel, Jordan, Kenya, Kiribati, Kuwait, Laos, Madagascar, Malaysia, Marshall Islands, Mongolia, Myanmar, Namibia, Nepal, Nicaragua, Nigeria, Oman, Palau, Papua New Guinea, Peru, Philippines, Qatar, Rwanda, Samoa, Saudi Arabia, Singapore, Solomon Islands, Somalia, Sri Lanka, Sudan, Suriname, Tanzania, Thailand, Timor-Leste, Tokelau, Tonga, Turkey, Tuvalu, Uganda, United Arab Emirates, Vanuatu, Venezuela, and Vietnam.

Countries requiring passports valid for at least 4 months on arrival include Micronesia and Zambia.

Countries requiring passports with a validity of at least 3 months beyond the date of intended departure include Azerbaijan, Bosnia and Herzegovina, Honduras, Montenegro, Nauru, Moldova and New Zealand. Similarly, the EEA countries of Iceland, Liechtenstein, Norway, all European Union countries (except Ireland) together with Switzerland also require 3 months validity beyond the date of the bearer's intended departure unless the bearer is an EEA or Swiss national.

Countries requiring passports valid for at least 3 months on arrival include Albania, North Macedonia, Panama, and Senegal.

Bermuda requires passports to be valid for at least 45 days upon entry.

Countries that require a passport validity of at least one month beyond the date of intended departure include Eritrea, Hong Kong, Lebanon, Macau, the Maldives and South Africa.

==== Maximum passport age ====
Countries of the Schengen area require non-EU passports to be less than 10 years old upon entry.

=== Criminal record ===
Some countries, including Australia, Canada, Fiji, New Zealand and the United States, routinely deny entry to non-citizens who have a criminal record, while others impose restrictions depending on the type of conviction and the length of the sentence.

=== Persona non grata ===
The government of a country can declare a diplomat persona non grata, banning them from entering the country or expelling them if they have already entered. In non-diplomatic use, the authorities of a country may also declare a foreigner persona non grata permanently or temporarily, usually because of unlawful activity.

=== Israeli stamps ===
Kuwait, Lebanon, Libya, and Yemen do not allow entry to people with passport stamps from Israel or whose passports have either a used or an unused Israeli visa, or where there is evidence of previous travel to Israel such as entry or exit stamps from neighbouring border posts in transit countries such as Jordan and Egypt.

To circumvent this Arab League boycott of Israel, the Israeli immigration services have now mostly ceased to stamp foreign nationals' passports on either entry to or exit from Israel (unless the entry is for some work-related purposes). Since 15 January 2013, Israel no longer stamps foreign passports at Ben Gurion Airport. Passports are still (as of 22 June 2017) stamped at Erez when passing into and out of Gaza.

Iran refuses admission to holders of passports containing an Israeli visa or stamp that is less than 12 months old.

=== Biometrics ===
Several countries mandate that all travellers, or all foreign travellers, be fingerprinted on arrival and will refuse admission to or even arrest travellers who refuse to comply. In some countries, such as the United States, this may apply even to transit passengers who merely wish to change planes rather than go landside.

Fingerprinting countries/regions include Afghanistan, Argentina, Brunei, Cambodia, China, Ethiopia, Ghana, Guinea, India, Japan, Kenya (both fingerprints and a photo are taken), Malaysia upon entry and departure, Mongolia, Saudi Arabia, the Schengen Area, Singapore, South Korea, Taiwan, Thailand, Uganda, the United Arab Emirates and the United States.

Many countries also require a photo be taken of people entering the country. The United States, which does not fully implement exit control formalities at its land frontiers (although long mandated by its own legislation), intends to implement facial recognition for passengers departing from international airports to identify people who overstay their visa.

Together with fingerprint and face recognition, iris scanning is one of three biometric identification technologies internationally standardised since 2006 by the International Civil Aviation Organization (ICAO) for use in e-passports and the United Arab Emirates conducts iris scanning on visitors who need to apply for a visa. The United States Department of Homeland Security has announced plans to greatly increase the biometric data it collects at US borders. In 2018, Singapore began trials of iris scanning at three land and maritime immigration checkpoints.

== See also ==
- Visa policy of the Dominican Republic
- Dominican Republic passport
