= Visa policy of the Dominican Republic =

Policy on permits required to enter Dominican Republic

Visitors to the Dominican Republic must obtain a visa from one of the Dominican Republic diplomatic missions unless they are citizens of one of the visa-exempt countries.

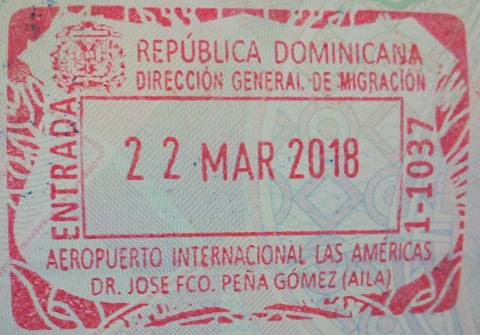
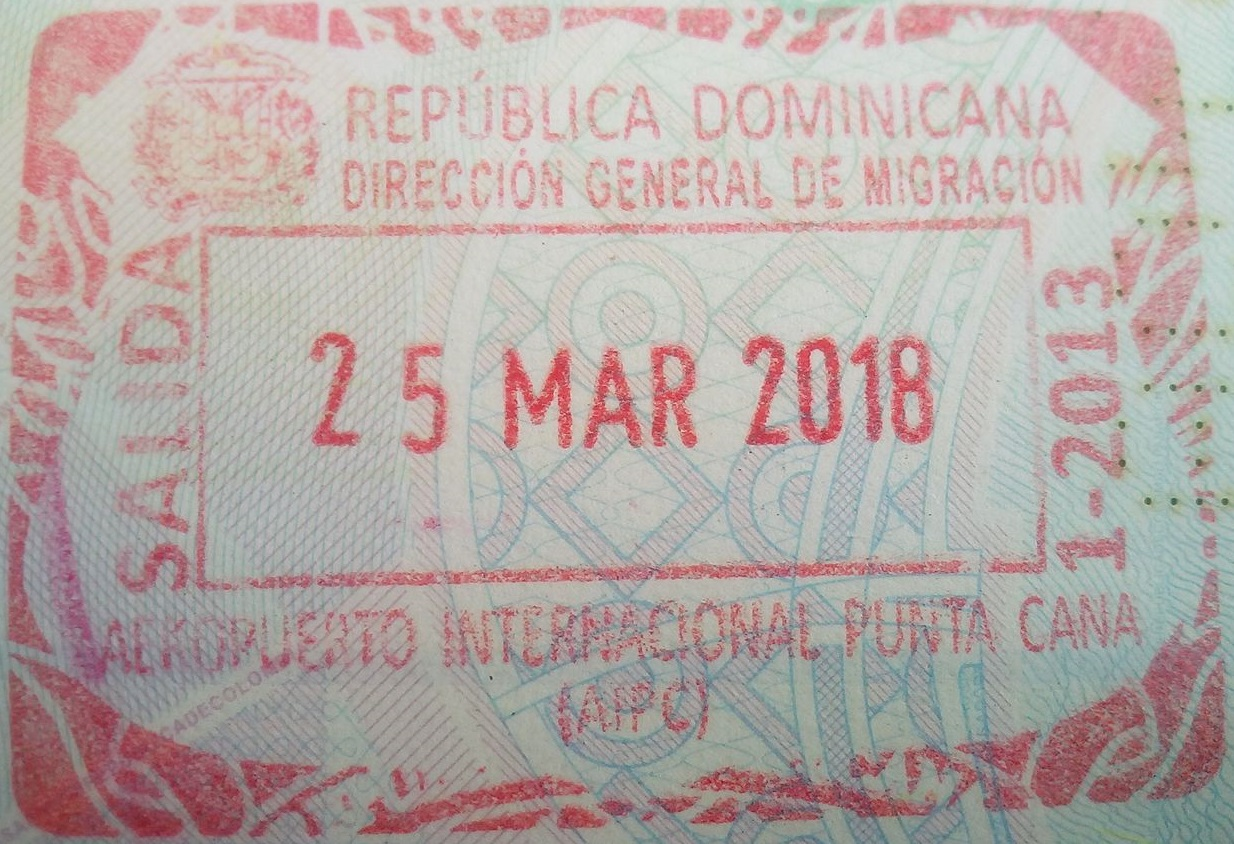
Entry and exit stamps

== Visa policy map ==
Visa policy of the Dominican Republic The Dominican Republic Visa not required (90 days) Visa not required (60 days) Visa not required (30 days) Visa not required (30 days) if holding a valid visa or residence permit issued by any Schengen Area member state, Canada, Cyprus, Ireland, the UK or the US; otherwise, visa required

== Visa exemption ==
=== Ordinary passports ===
Citizens of the following countries and territories may enter the Dominican Republic without a visa for tourist purposes for stays up to the duration listed below. Extension of stay is possible for up to 120 days for a fee (unless otherwise noted).

90 days

- El Salvador^{1}

60 days

- Brazil^{B}
- Ecuador
- Honduras
- Morocco^{B}
- Paraguay
- Peru

60 days within any 180 days

- Russia

30 days

- All European Union member states

- Albania
- Andorra
- Antigua and Barbuda
- Argentina
- Australia
- Bahamas
- Bahrain
- Barbados
- Belize
- Bolivia
- Bosnia and Herzegovina
- Botswana
- Brunei
- Canada
- Chile
- Colombia
- Costa Rica
- Fiji
- Georgia
- Grenada
- Guatemala
- Guyana
- Honduras
- Hong Kong
- Iceland
- Israel
- Jamaica
- Japan
- Kazakhstan
- Kiribati
- Kuwait
- Liechtenstein
- Macau
- Malaysia
- Marshall Islands
- Mauritius
- Mexico
- Micronesia
- Monaco
- Montenegro
- Namibia
- Nauru
- New Zealand
- Nicaragua
- North Macedonia
- Norway
- Panama
- Papua New Guinea
- Qatar
- Saint Kitts and Nevis
- Saint Lucia
- Saint Vincent and the Grenadines
- San Marino
- Serbia
- Seychelles
- Singapore
- Solomon Islands
- South Africa
- South Korea
- Suriname
- Switzerland
- Taiwan
- Thailand
- Tonga
- Trinidad and Tobago
- Turkey
- Tuvalu
- Ukraine
- United Arab Emirates
- United Kingdom^{2}
- United States
- Uruguay
- Vanuatu
- Vatican City

_{B - May enter without a visa for business purposes as well.}
_{1 - 90 days, extendable to 180 days.}
_{2 - For holders of British citizens passports only.}

Date of visa changes
- 19 April 1957: Japan
- 27 October 1966: Spain
- 22 March 1968: Austria
- 31 July 1968: Israel
- 4 March 1982: South Korea
- 4 July 1983: Ecuador
- 1 June 1989: Finland
- 18 December 2007: Albania, Andorra, Bahrain, Belize, Bosnia and Herzegovina, Botswana, Brunei, Cyprus, Estonia, Fiji, Guyana, Iceland, Kazakhstan, Kiribati, Kuwait, Latvia, Liechtenstein, Lithuania, Malta, Malaysia, Marshall Islands, Mauritius, Micronesia, Namibia, Nauru, Qatar, Romania, Seychelles, Singapore, Solomon Islands, South Africa, Thailand, Tonga, Turkey, Tuvalu, United Arab Emirates and Vanuatu
- 15 May 2015: Colombia
- 1 January 2017: Peru
- 16 January 2019: El Salvador
- 5 April 2019: Paraguay
- 21 June 2019: Brazil
- 1 September 2019: Honduras
- 15 December 2020: Russia
- 14 July 2021: Morocco

Cancelled:

- 16 December 2019: Venezuela

==== Substitute visa ====
Holders of a valid visa or residence card of any Schengen Area member state, Canada, Cyprus, Ireland, the United Kingdom or the United States may enter the Dominican Republic without a visa for up to 30 days if they travel as a tourist.

=== Non-ordinary passports ===
Holders of diplomatic, official or service passports of Argentina, Belize, Brazil (60 days), Chile, Colombia, Costa Rica, Ecuador (90 days), El Salvador, France, Guatemala, Honduras, Israel, Japan, Malaysia, Morocco (60 days), Nicaragua, India (30 days), Panama, Paraguay, Peru (60 days), Russia, Serbia (60 days), Singapore (90 days), South Korea, Switzerland, Tajikistan, Taiwan, Trinidad and Tobago, Ukraine, Uruguay and Vietnam may enter the Dominican Republic without a visa for up to 30 days (unless otherwise noted).

=== Future changes ===
The Dominican Republic has signed visa exemption agreements with the following countries, but they have not yet been ratified:

Country	Passports	Agreement signed on
Azerbaijan	Ordinary	23 September 2026
Rwanda	All	25 September 2024

== Tourist fee ==
Visitors are required to pay a tourist fee of 10 USD, except:

- citizens, residents or holders of visas of the Dominican Republic
- diplomats accredited to the Dominican Republic
- citizens of Argentina, Chile, Israel, Japan, South Korea or Uruguay
- those arriving in a small private aircraft (up to 30,000 pounds and 12 passengers)

This fee was previously charged in the form of a tourist card on arrival, but as of 25 April 2018, the card is no longer required of those arriving by air. Instead, the fee is charged with the airfare for all tickets issued outside the Dominican Republic.

Visitors who were automatically charged the fee with the airfare but satisfy one of the exemptions may request a refund of this fee online, to be issued within 15 days on a credit card, check or local bank account.

Visitors who enter the Dominican Republic by land or sea (and are not exempt) are still required to purchase a tourist card on arrival, which costs 10 USD or 10 EUR.

== Visitor statistics ==
Most visitors arriving in the Dominican Republic were from the following countries of nationality:

Country/Territory	2017	2016	2015	2014	2013
United States	2,073,963	2,085,186	2,001,909	1,784,486	1,587,404
Canada	827,721	768,486	745,860	706,394	684,071
Germany	265,709	259,133	247,613	230,733	214,151
Russia	245,346	136,249	71,572	180,821	188,110
France	221,492	232,024	227,483	229,678	232,754
Argentina	182,170	137,642	133,888	112,489	107,305
Spain	177,993	169,760	172,245	150,859	142,207
United Kingdom	177,534	165,111	142,083	126,563	108,236
Puerto Rico	111,095	121,131	115,084	103,891	74,580
Venezuela	109,734	170,713	167,176	112,854	75,173
Colombia	103,444	N/A	N/A	N/A	N/A
Total	5,354,017	5,178,050	4,872,319	4,511,062	4,117,493

== See also ==
- Visa requirements for Dominican Republic citizens
