= List of diplomatic missions of the Dominican Republic =

This is a list of diplomatic missions of the Dominican Republic, excluding honorary consulates.

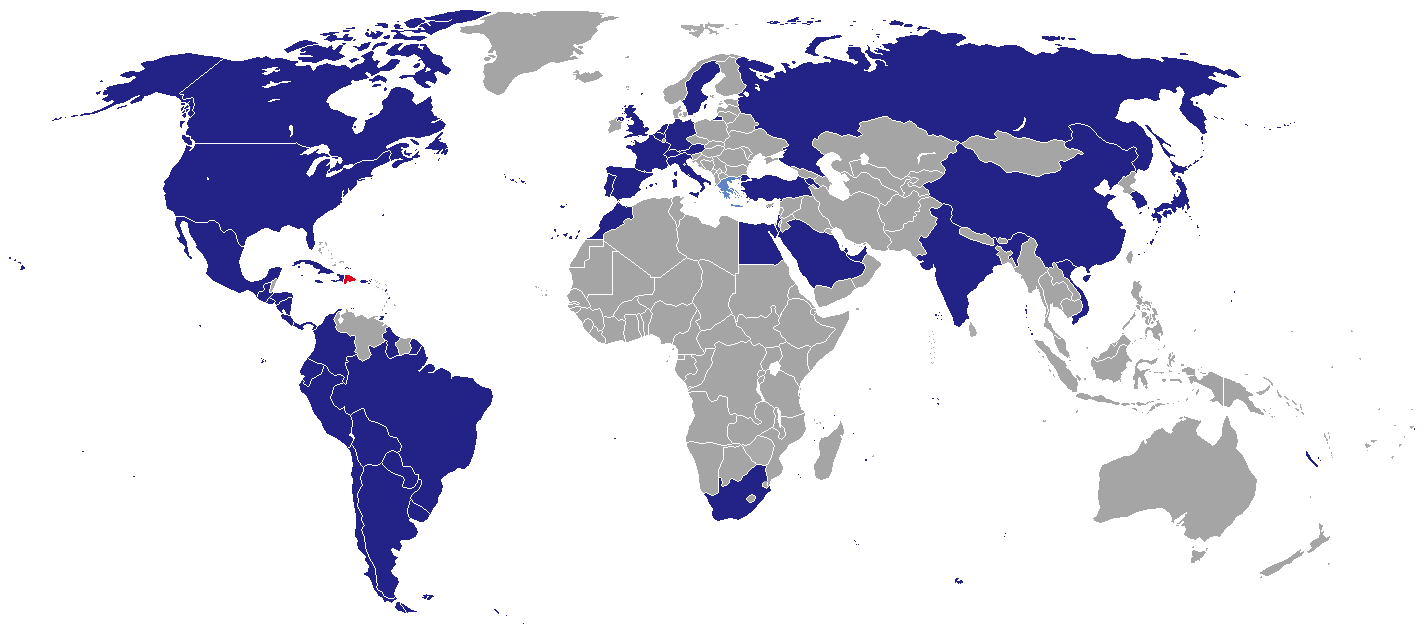
Countries with Dominican Republic diplomatic missions

== Current missions ==
=== Africa ===
Host country	Host city	Mission	Concurrent accreditation	Ref.
Egypt	Cairo	Embassy	Countries: Jordan; Nigeria; Palestine; Sudan	
Morocco	Rabat	Embassy	Countries: Gambia; Ghana; Guinea; Mali; Senegal; Tunisia	
South Africa	Pretoria	Embassy	Countries: Angola; Botswana; Gabon; Kenya; Madagascar; Mozambique; Namibia; Rwanda; Uganda; Zimbabwe	

=== Americas ===
Host country	Host city	Mission	Concurrent accreditation	Ref.
Antigua and Barbuda	St. John's	Embassy	Countries: Dominica; Saint Kitts and Nevis; Saint Lucia; Multilateral organization: Organisation of Eastern Caribbean States	
Argentina	Buenos Aires	Embassy		
Bolivia	La Paz	Embassy		
Brazil	Brasília	Embassy		
Brazil	Rio de Janeiro	Consulate-General		
Brazil	São Paulo	Consulate-General		
Canada	Ottawa	Embassy		
Canada	Montreal	Consulate-General		
Canada	Toronto	Consulate-General		
Chile	Santiago de Chile	Embassy		
Colombia	Bogotá	Embassy		
Costa Rica	San José	Embassy		
Cuba	Havana	Embassy		
Ecuador	Quito	Embassy		
El Salvador	San Salvador	Embassy		
Guatemala	Guatemala City	Embassy		
Guyana	Georgetown	Embassy	Countries: Suriname; Multilateral organization: Caribbean Community	
Haiti	Port-au-Prince	Embassy		
Haiti	Anse-à-Pitres	Consulate-General		
Haiti	Belladère	Consulate-General		
Haiti	Cap-Haïtien	Consulate-General		
Haiti	Ouanaminthe	Consulate-General		
Honduras	Tegucigalpa	Embassy		
Honduras	San Pedro Sula	Consulate-General		
Jamaica	Kingston	Embassy	Countries: Bahamas	
Mexico	Mexico City	Embassy		
Mexico	Mexico City	Consulate-General		
Panama	Panama City	Embassy		
Paraguay	Asunción	Embassy		
Peru	Lima	Embassy		
Trinidad and Tobago	Port of Spain	Embassy	Countries: Barbados; Grenada; Saint Vincent and the Grenadines	
United States	Washington, D.C.	Embassy		
United States	Boston (Massachusetts)	Consulate-General		
United States	Chicago (Illinois)	Consulate-General		
United States	Glendale (California)	Consulate-General		
United States	Houston (Texas)	Consulate-General		
United States	Miami (Florida)	Consulate-General		
United States	New Orleans (Louisiana)	Consulate-General		
United States	New York City (Bronx)	Consular Office		
United States	New York City (Manhattan)	Consulate-General		
United States	Orlando (Florida)	Consulate-General		
United States	Paterson (New Jersey)	Consulate-General		
United States	Philadelphia (Pennsylvania)	Consulate-General		
United States	Mayagüez (Puerto Rico)	Consulate-General		
United States	San Juan (Puerto Rico)	Consulate-General		
Uruguay	Montevideo	Embassy		

=== Asia ===
Host country	Host city	Mission	Concurrent accreditation	Ref.
Armenia	Yerevan	Embassy office		
China	Beijing	Embassy	Countries: Malaysia; Thailand; Timor-Leste	
China	Hong Kong	Consulate-General	Countries: Malaysia; Thailand; Timor-Leste	
China	Shanghai	Consulate-General	Countries: Malaysia; Thailand; Timor-Leste	
India	New Delhi	Embassy	Countries: Bangladesh; Maldives; Nepal; Sri Lanka	
Israel	Tel Aviv	Embassy	Countries: Cyprus	
Japan	Tokyo	Embassy	Countries: Australia; New Zealand	
Qatar	Doha	Embassy	Countries: Iraq; Kuwait	
Saudi Arabia	Riyadh	Embassy	Countries: Bahrain; Djibouti; Oman	
South Korea	Seoul	Embassy	Countries: Brunei	
Turkey	Ankara	Embassy	Countries: Azerbaijan; Bulgaria; Georgia; Iran; Lebanon; Turkmenistan	
United Arab Emirates	Abu Dhabi	Embassy	Countries: Pakistan; Seychelles; Yemen	
Vietnam	Hanoi	Embassy	Countries: Cambodia; Indonesia; Laos; Philippines	

=== Europe ===
Host country	Host city	Mission	Concurrent accreditation	Ref.
Austria	Vienna	Embassy	Countries: Czechia; Hungary; Moldova; Serbia; Slovakia	
Belgium	Brussels	Embassy	Countries: Luxembourg; International Organizations: European Union	
Belgium	Antwerp	Consulate-General	Countries: Luxembourg; International Organizations: European Union	
Czechia	Prague	Consulate-General		
France	Paris	Embassy	Countries: Algeria; Monaco	
France	Paris	Consulate-General	Countries: Algeria; Monaco	
France	Marseille	Consulate-General	Countries: Algeria; Monaco	
France	Pointe-à-Pitre, Guadeloupe	Consulate	Countries: Algeria; Monaco	
Germany	Berlin	Embassy	Countries: Poland; Ukraine	
Germany	Frankfurt	Consulate-General	Countries: Poland; Ukraine	
Germany	Hamburg	Consulate-General	Countries: Poland; Ukraine	
Greece	Athens	Consulate-General		
Holy See (Note: The Dominican Embassy to the Holy See is located outside Vatican territory in Rome.)	Rome	Embassy	Sovereign entity: Sovereign Military Order of Malta	
Italy	Rome	Embassy	Countries: Albania; Croatia; Greece; Malta; Montenegro; North Macedonia; Romania; San Marino	
Italy	Genoa	Consulate-General	Countries: Albania; Croatia; Greece; Malta; Montenegro; North Macedonia; Romania; San Marino	
Italy	Milan	Consulate-General	Countries: Albania; Croatia; Greece; Malta; Montenegro; North Macedonia; Romania; San Marino	
Netherlands	The Hague	Embassy		
Netherlands	Amsterdam	Consulate-General		
Netherlands	Philipsburg, Sint Maarten	Consulate-General		
Netherlands	Willemstad, Curaçao	Consulate-General		
Portugal	Lisbon	Embassy	Countries: Cape Verde; Guinea-Bissau	
Russia	Moscow	Embassy	Countries: Armenia; Belarus; Kazakhstan; Kyrgyzstan; Mongolia; Tajikistan; Uzbekistan	
Spain	Madrid	Embassy	Countries: Andorra; Equatorial Guinea; International organization: UN Tourism	
Spain	Madrid	Consulate-General	Countries: Andorra; Equatorial Guinea; International organization: UN Tourism	
Spain	Barcelona	Consulate-General	Countries: Andorra; Equatorial Guinea; International organization: UN Tourism	
Spain	Santa Cruz de Tenerife	Consulate-General	Countries: Andorra; Equatorial Guinea; International organization: UN Tourism	
Spain	Seville	Consulate-General	Countries: Andorra; Equatorial Guinea; International organization: UN Tourism	
Spain	Valencia	Consulate-General	Countries: Andorra; Equatorial Guinea; International organization: UN Tourism	
Sweden	Stockholm	Embassy	Countries: Denmark; Estonia; Finland; Latvia; Lithuania; Norway	
Switzerland	Bern	Embassy	Countries: Bosnia and Herzegovina; Liechtenstein	
Switzerland	Zurich	Consulate-General	Countries: Bosnia and Herzegovina; Liechtenstein	
United Kingdom	London	Embassy	Countries: Ireland	

=== Multilateral organizations ===
Organization	Host city	Host country	Mission	Ref.
Food and Agriculture Organization	Rome	Italy	Permanent Mission	
International Civil Aviation Organization	Montreal	Canada	Permanent Mission	
Organization of American States	Washington, D.C.	United States	Permanent Mission	
United Nations	New York City	United States	Permanent Mission	
United Nations	Geneva	Switzerland	Permanent Mission	
United Nations	Vienna	Austria	Permanent Mission	
UNESCO	Paris	France	Permanent Delegation	
World Trade Organization	Geneva	Switzerland	Permanent Mission	

== Gallery ==
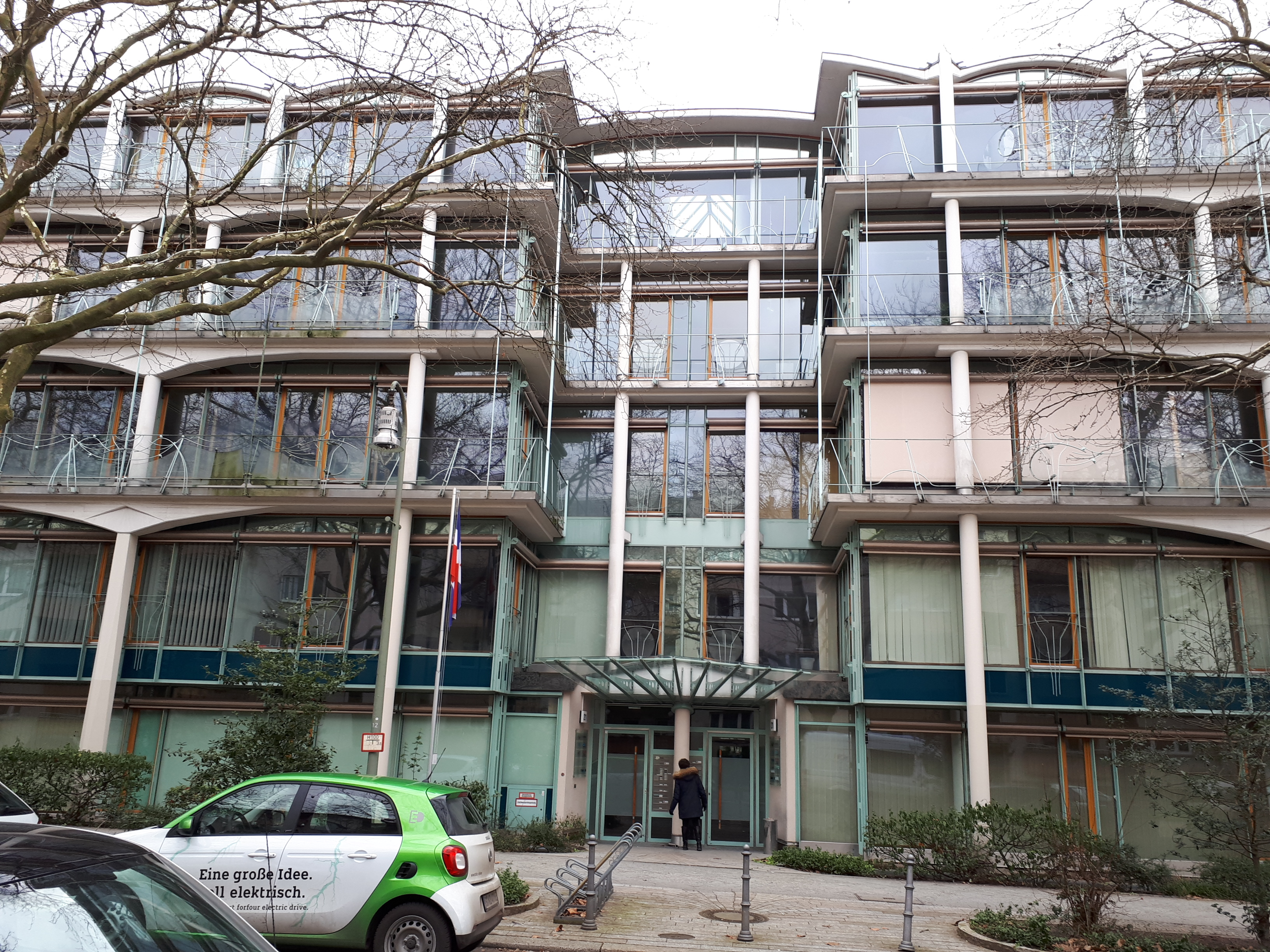
Former Embassy building in Berlin

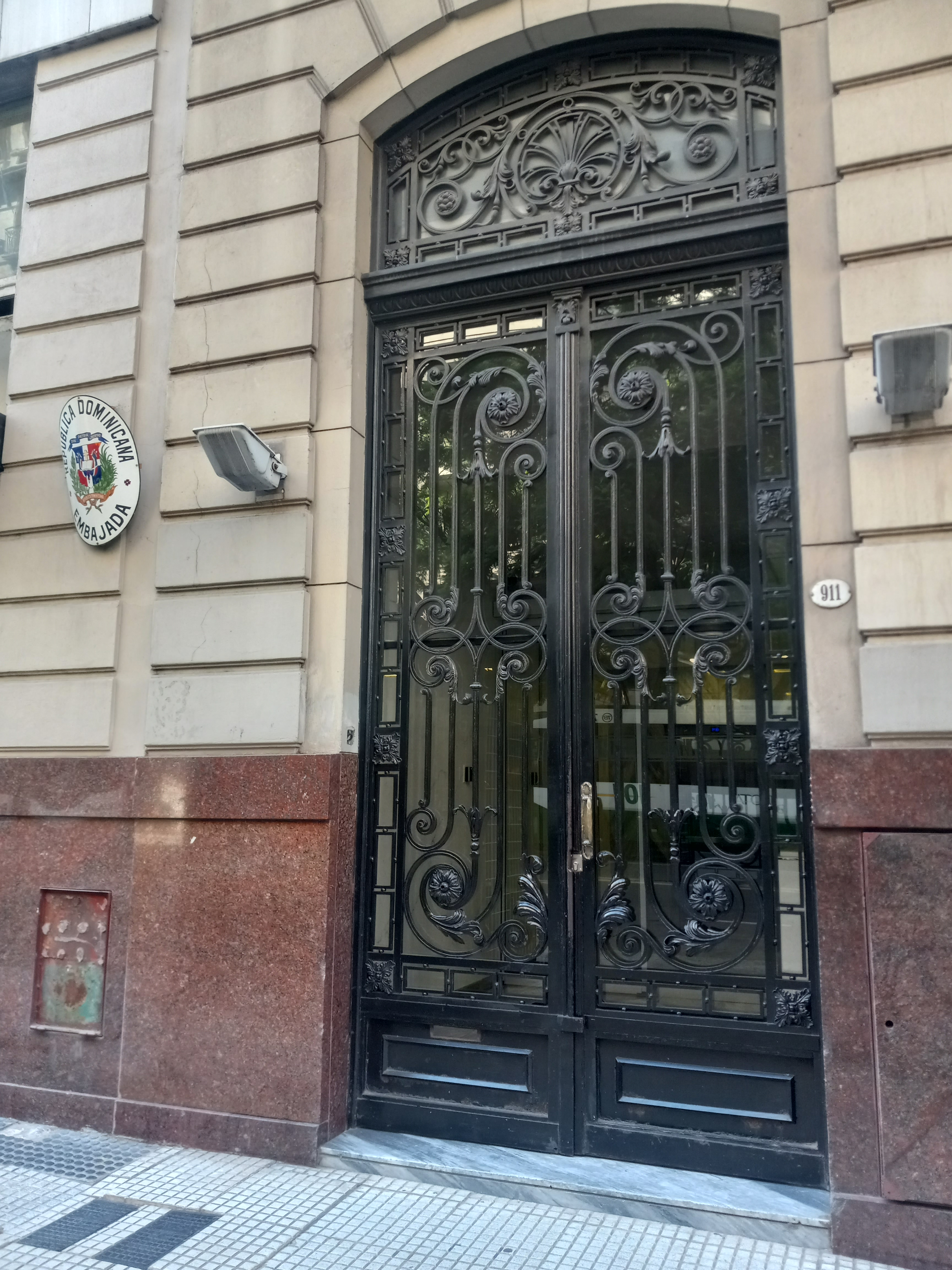
Embassy in Buenos Aires

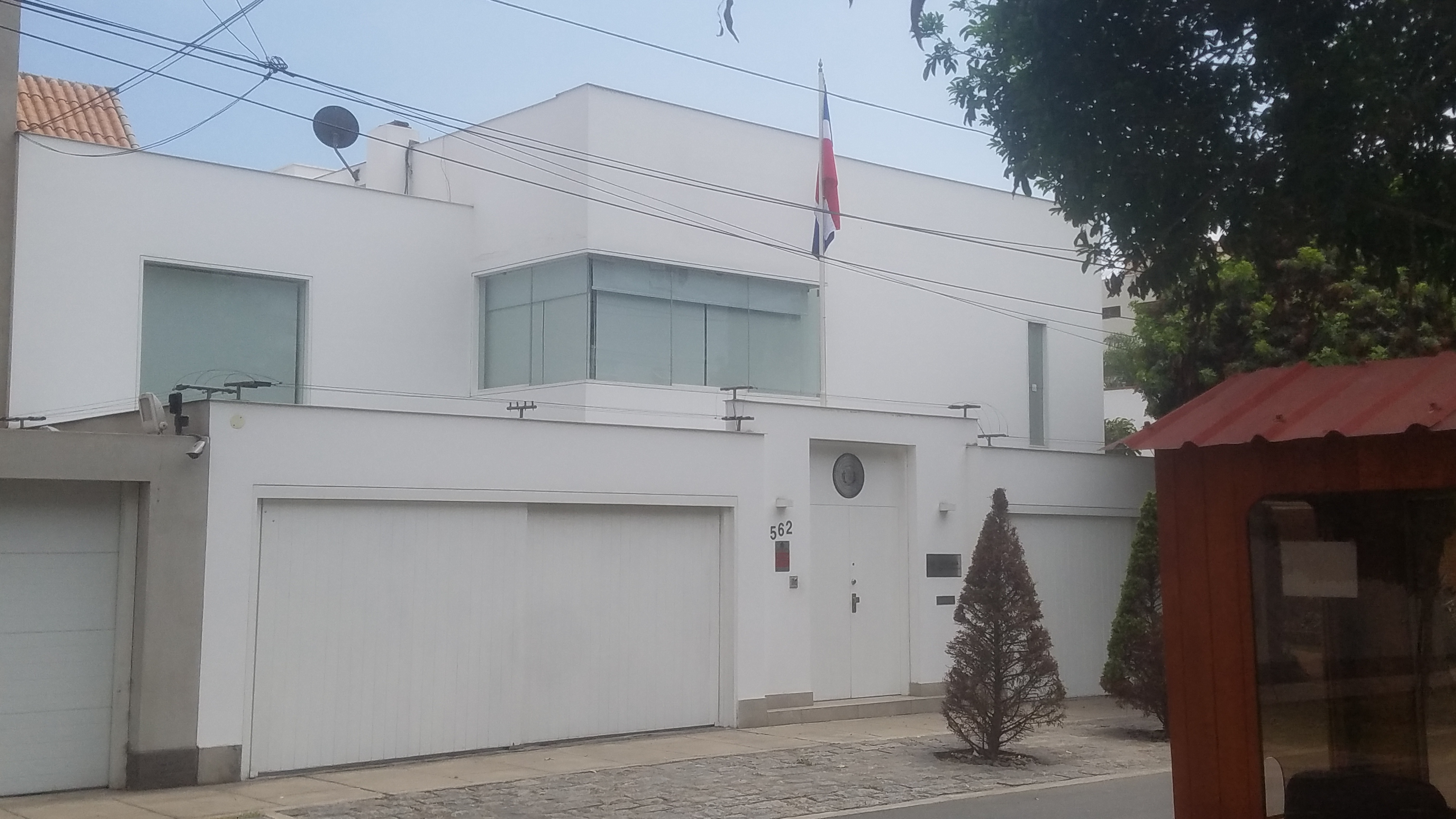
Embassy in Lima

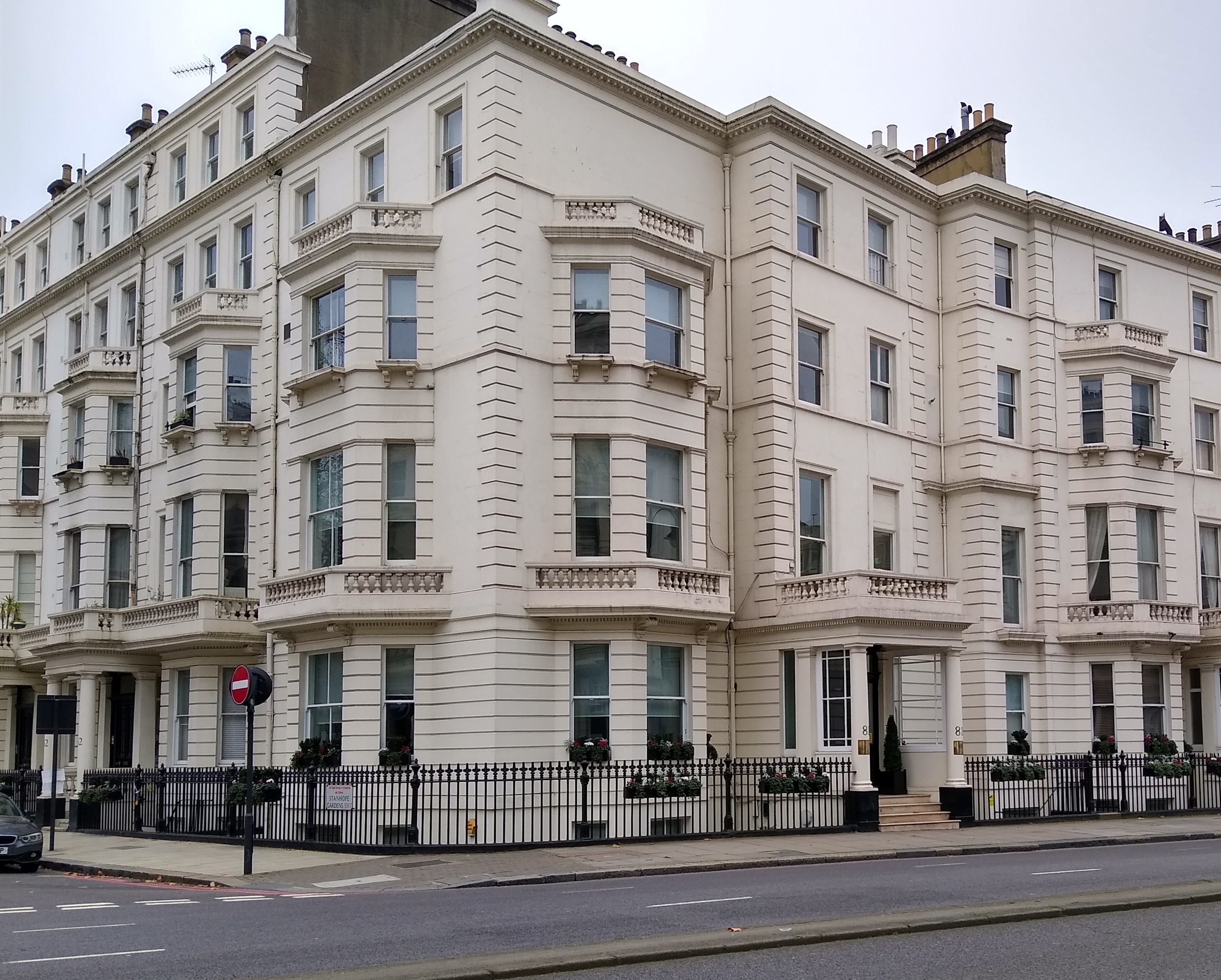
Embassy in London

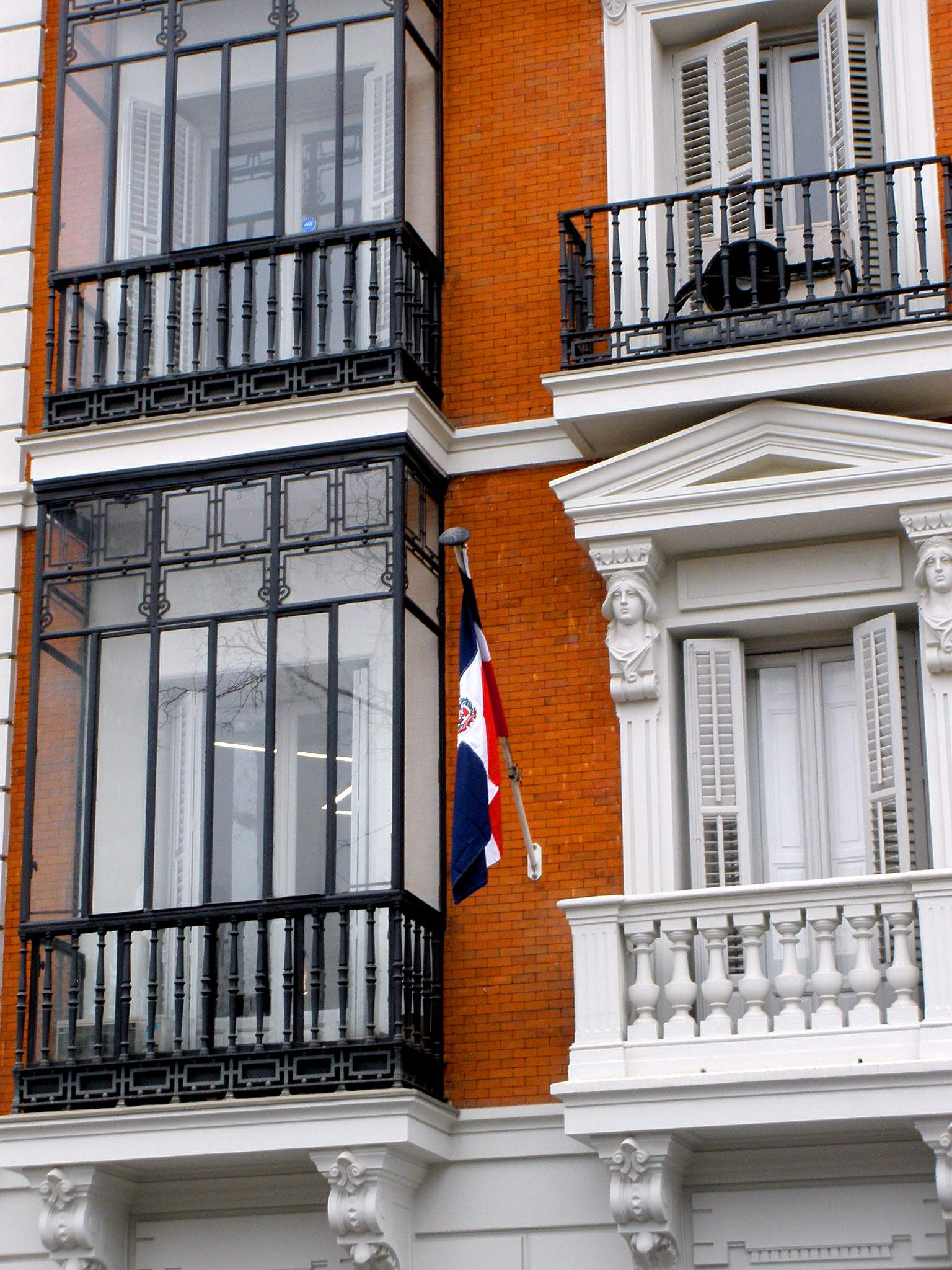
Embassy in Madrid

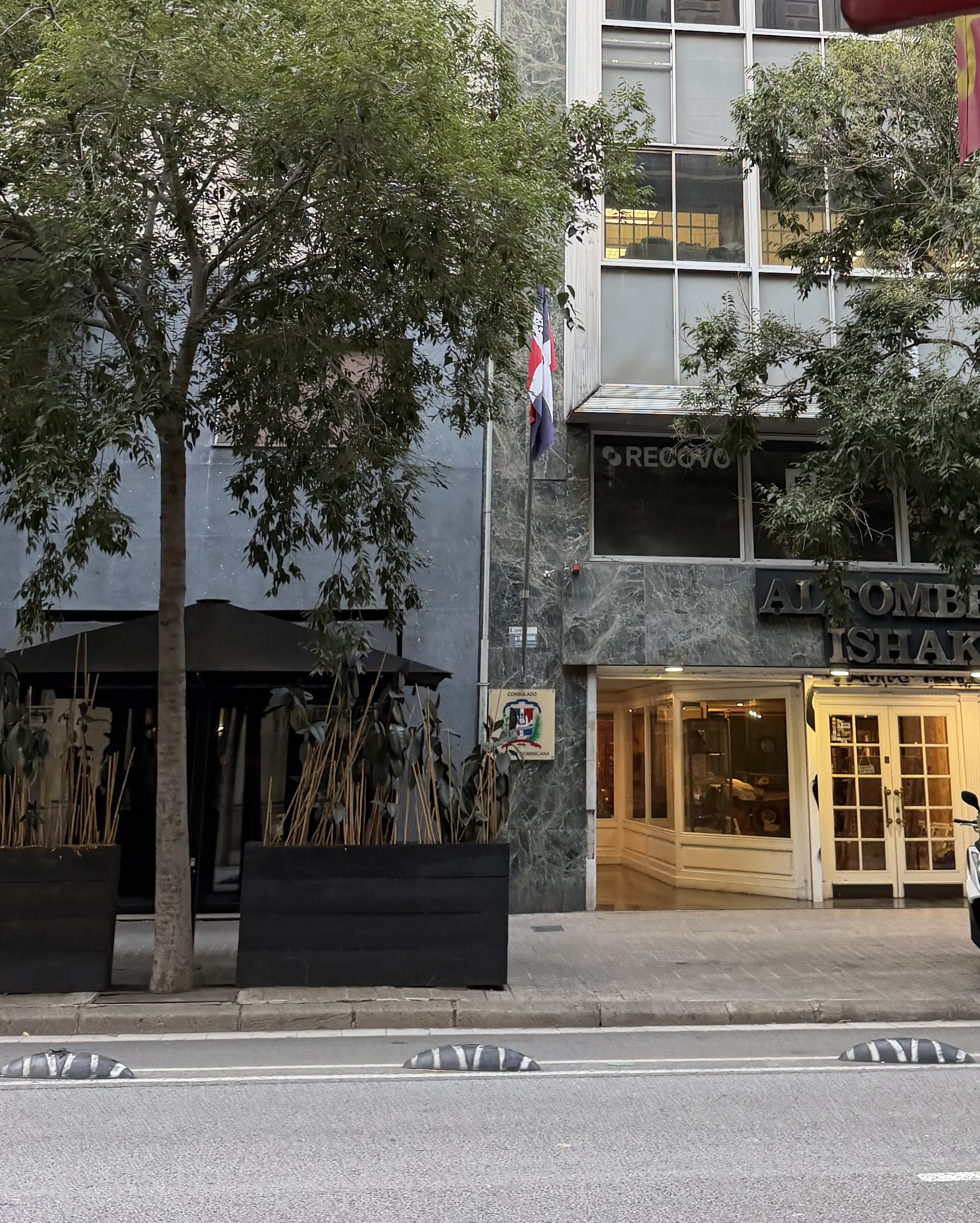
Consulate-General in Barcelona

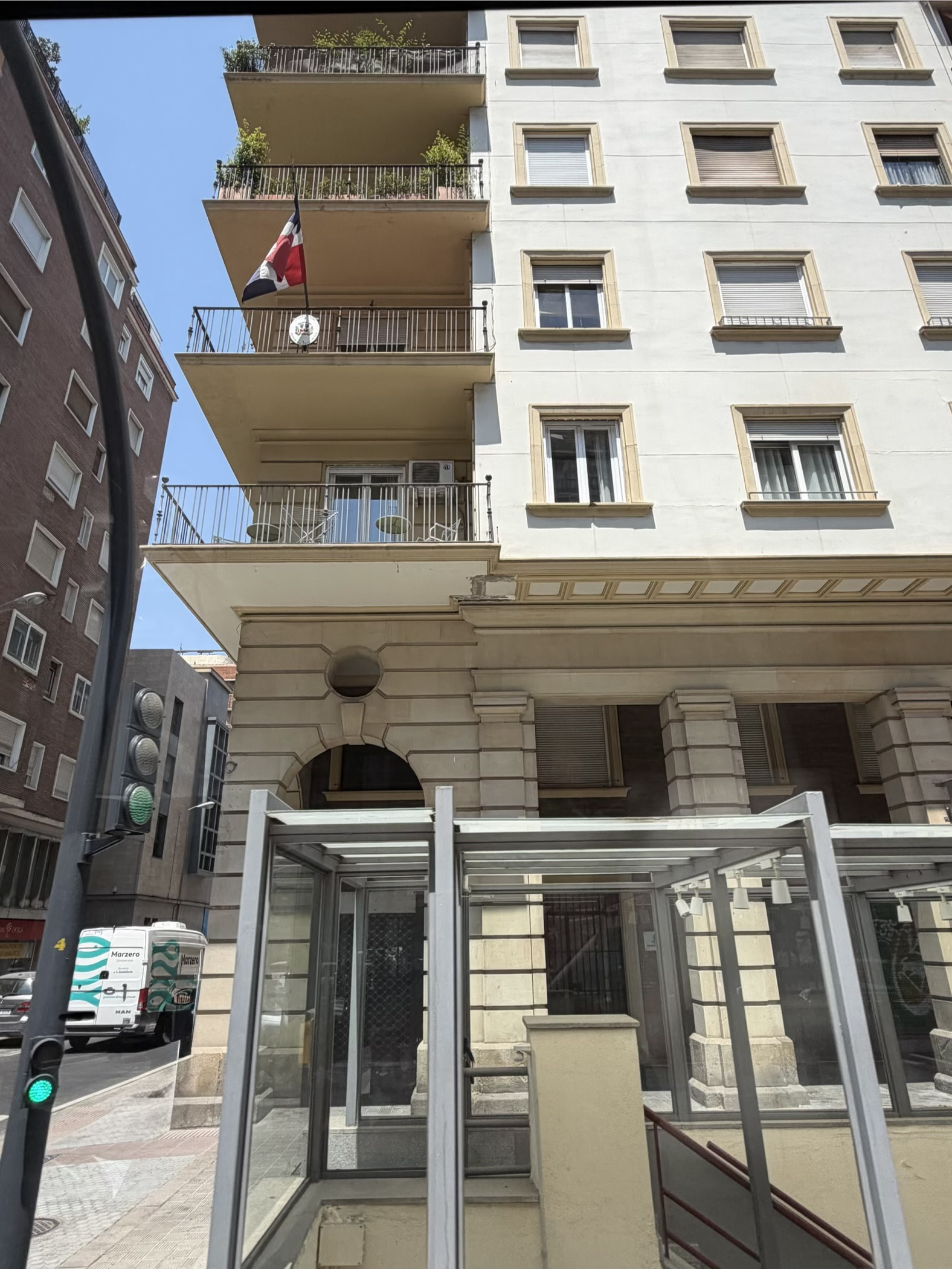
Consulate-General in Seville

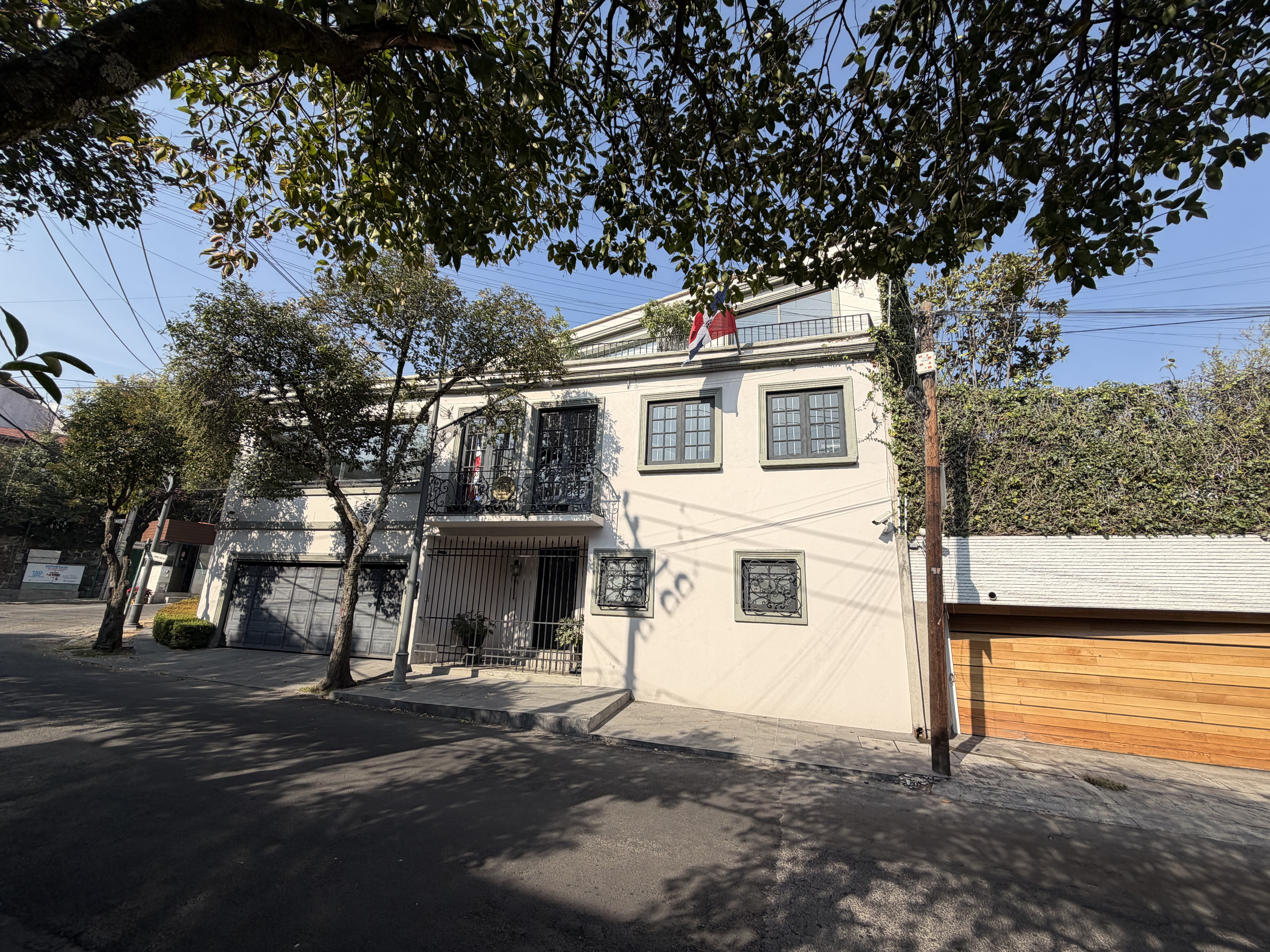
Embassy in Mexico City

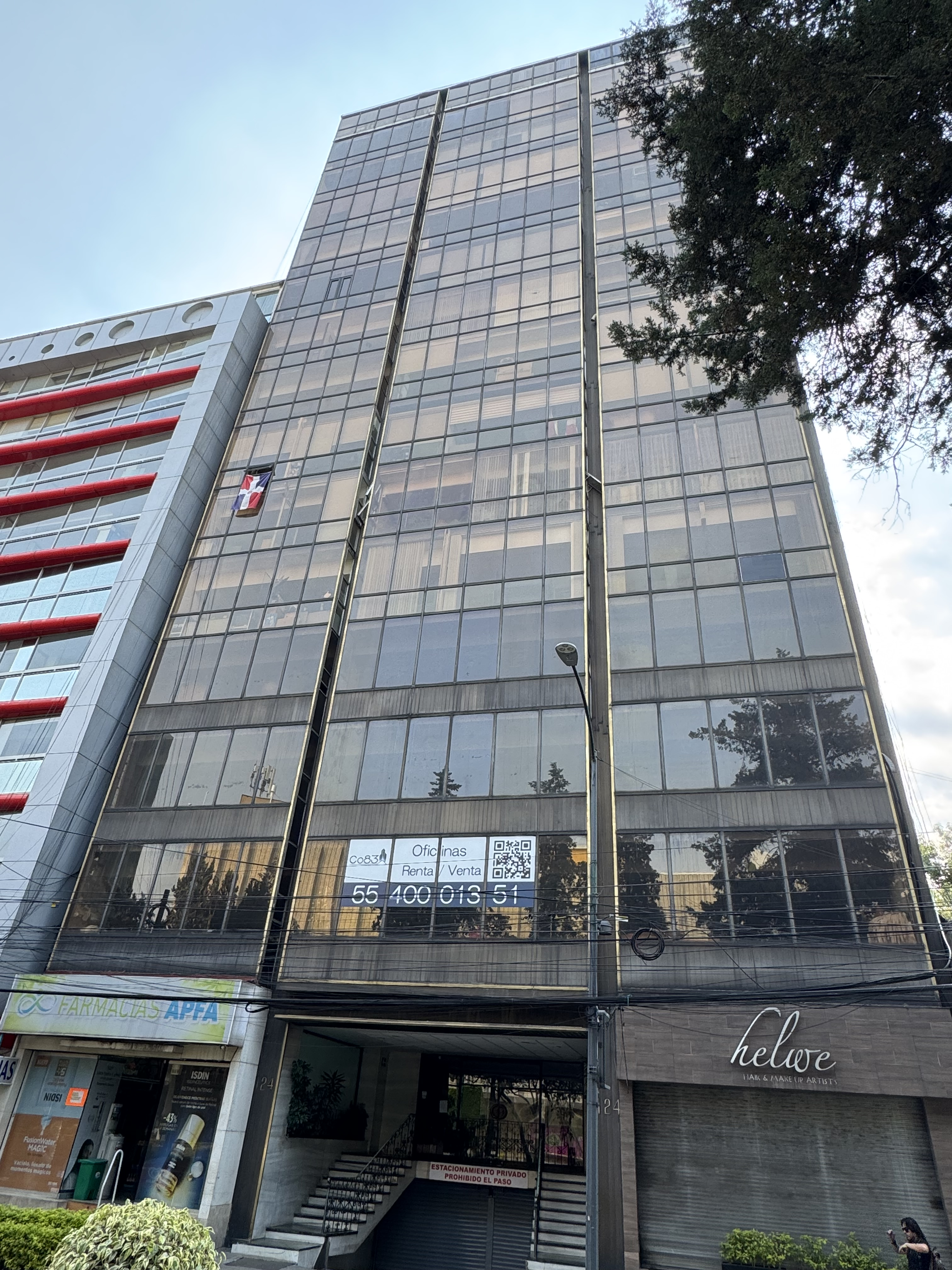
Building hosting the Consulate-General in Mexico City

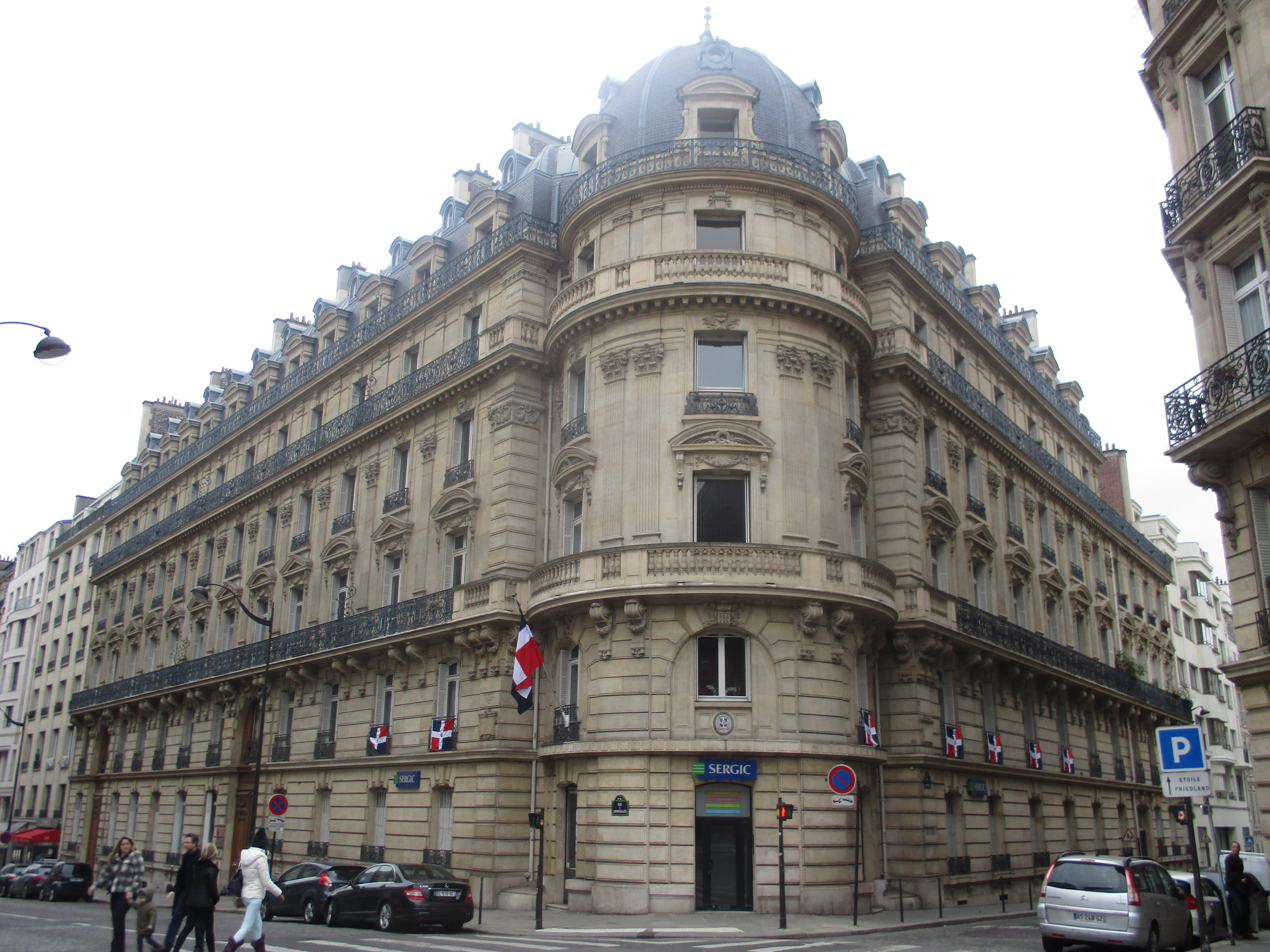
Embassy in Paris

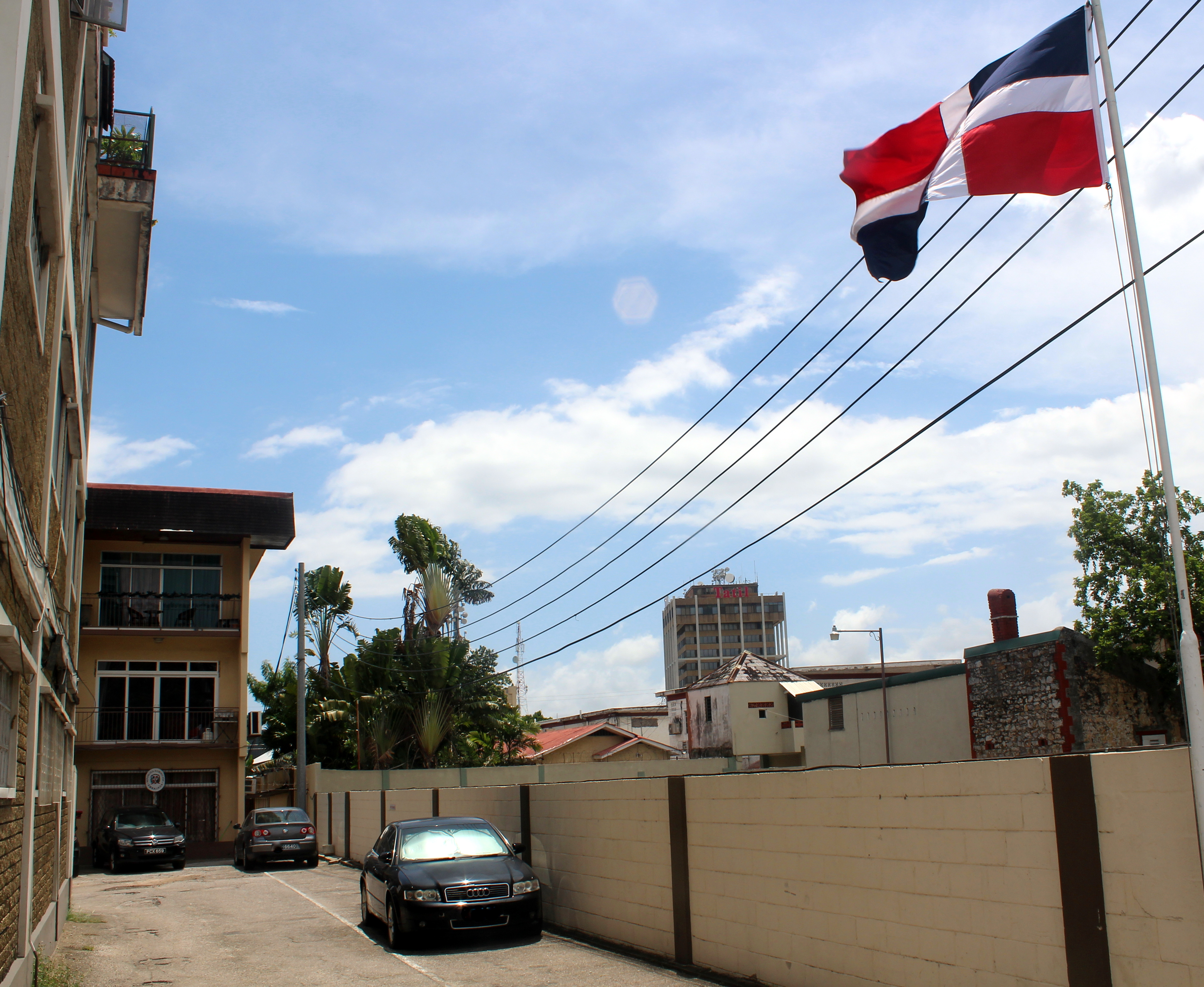
Embassy in Port of Spain

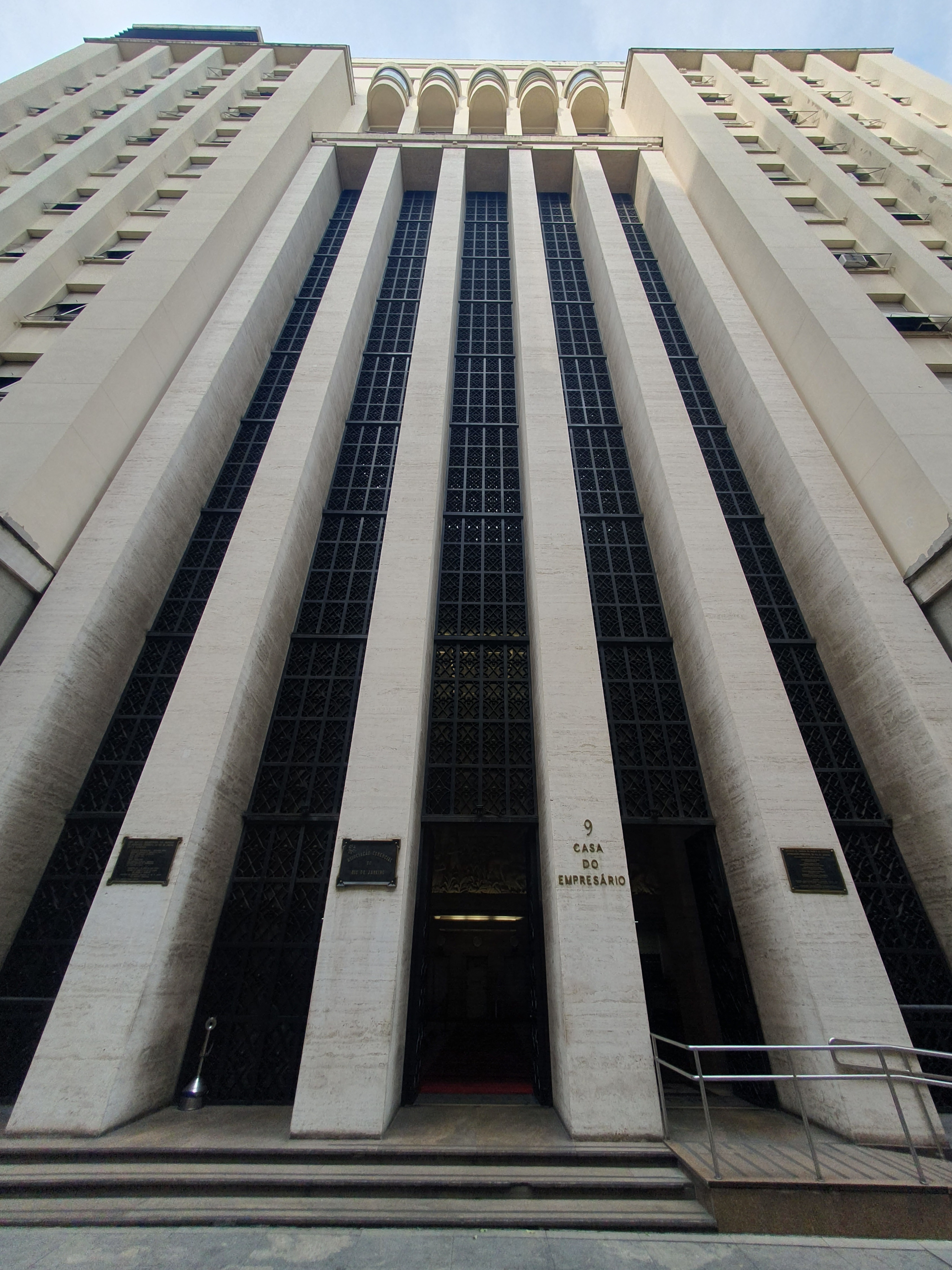
Building hosting the Consulate-General in Rio de Janeiro

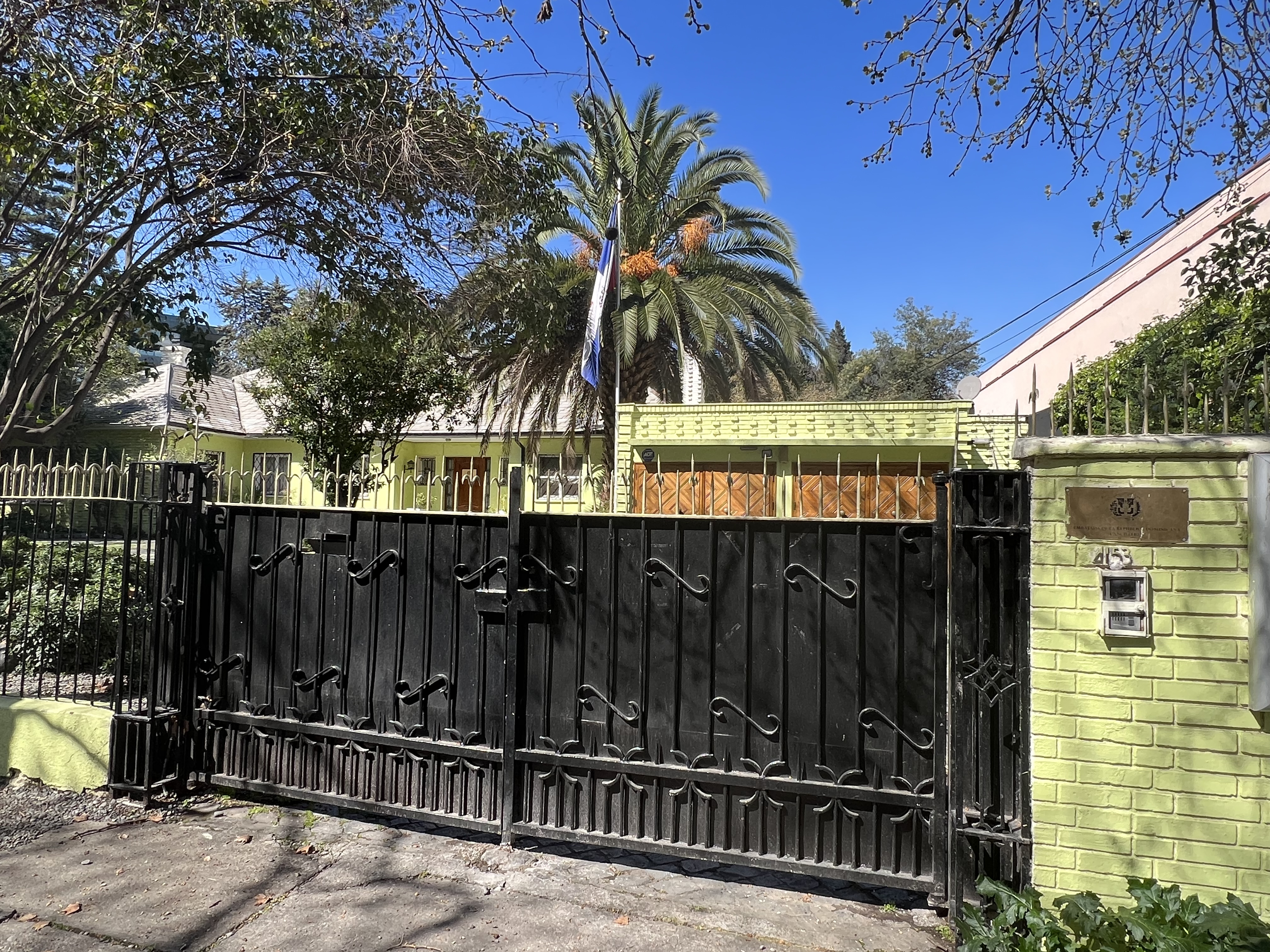
Embassy in Santiago

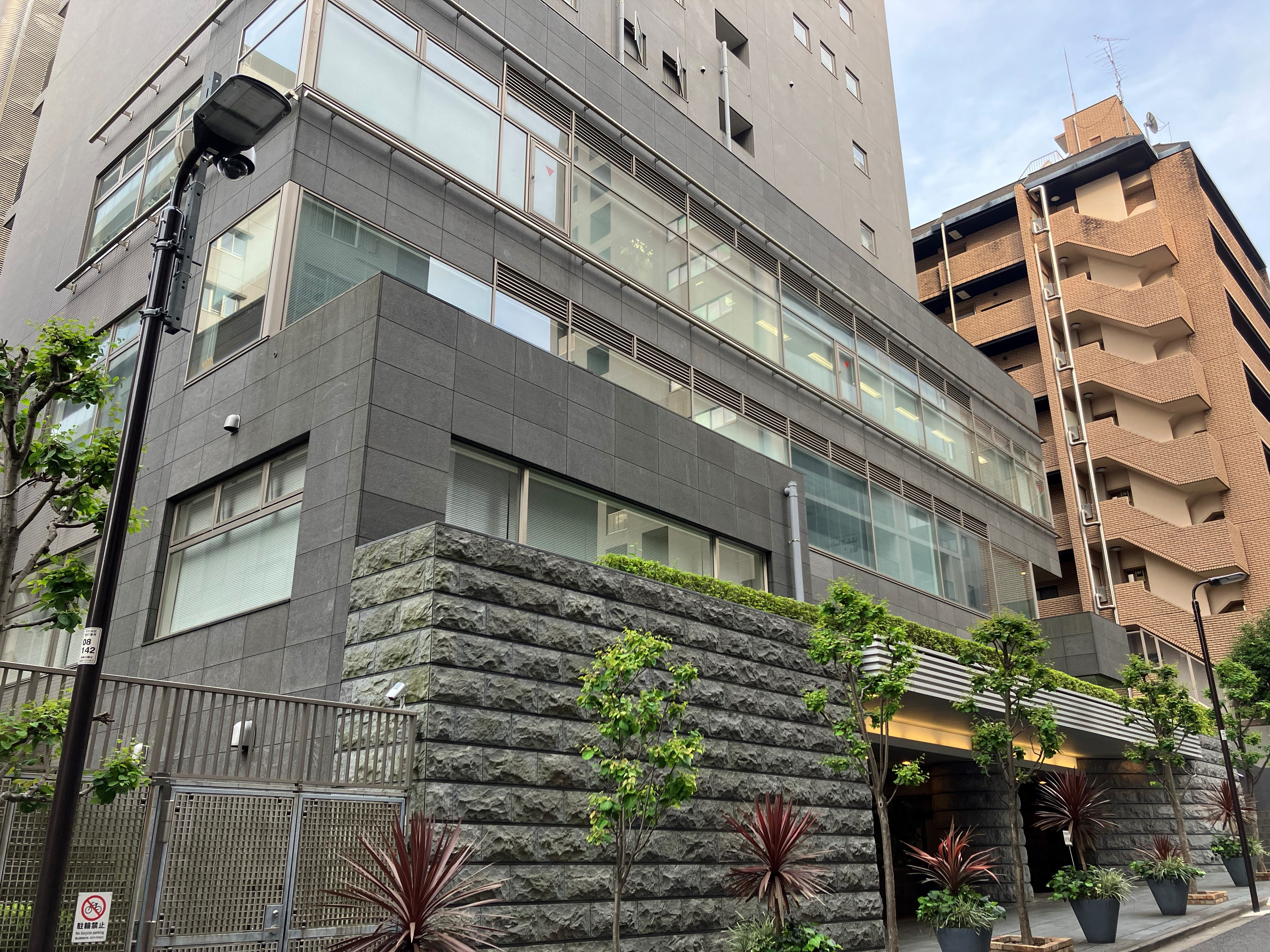
Embassy in Tokyo

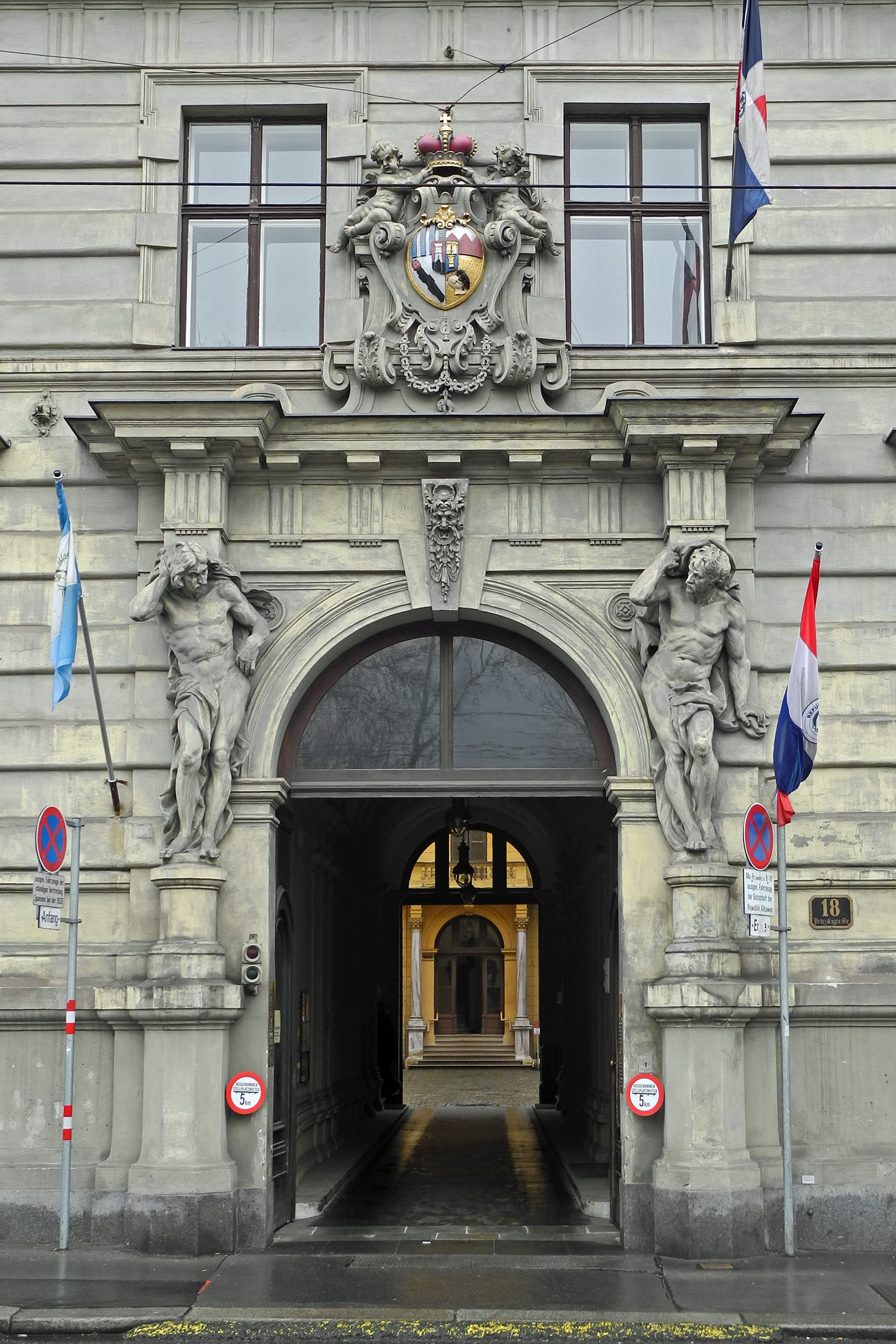
Embassy in Vienna

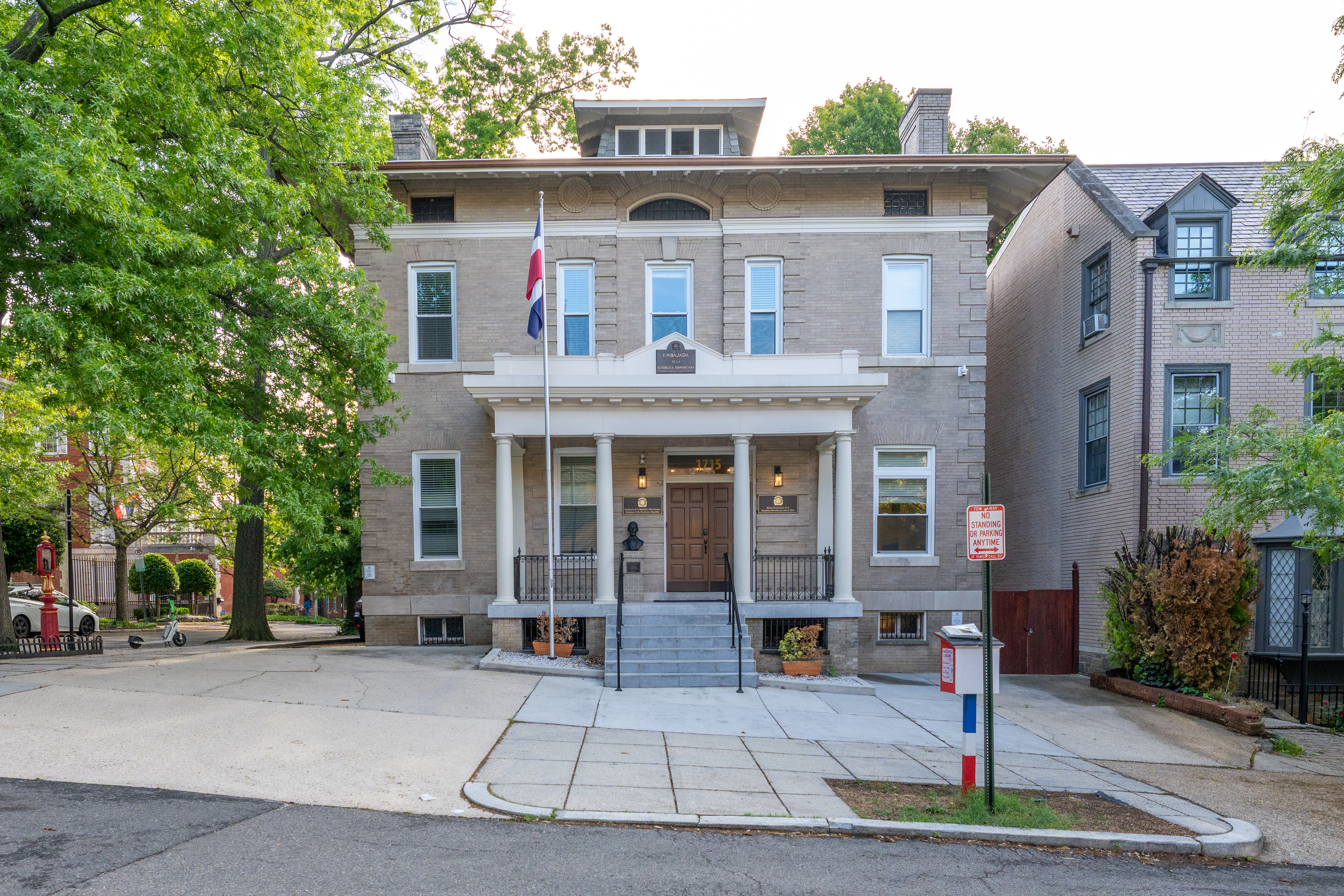
Embassy in Washington, D.C.

== Future missions to open ==
Below is a list of countries where the government of the Dominican Republic has stated its intentions to open diplomatic missions:

- Lebanon
  - Beirut (Embassy)

== See also ==
- Foreign relations of the Dominican Republic
- Visa policy of the Dominican Republic
