= Dominican Republic–Italy relations =

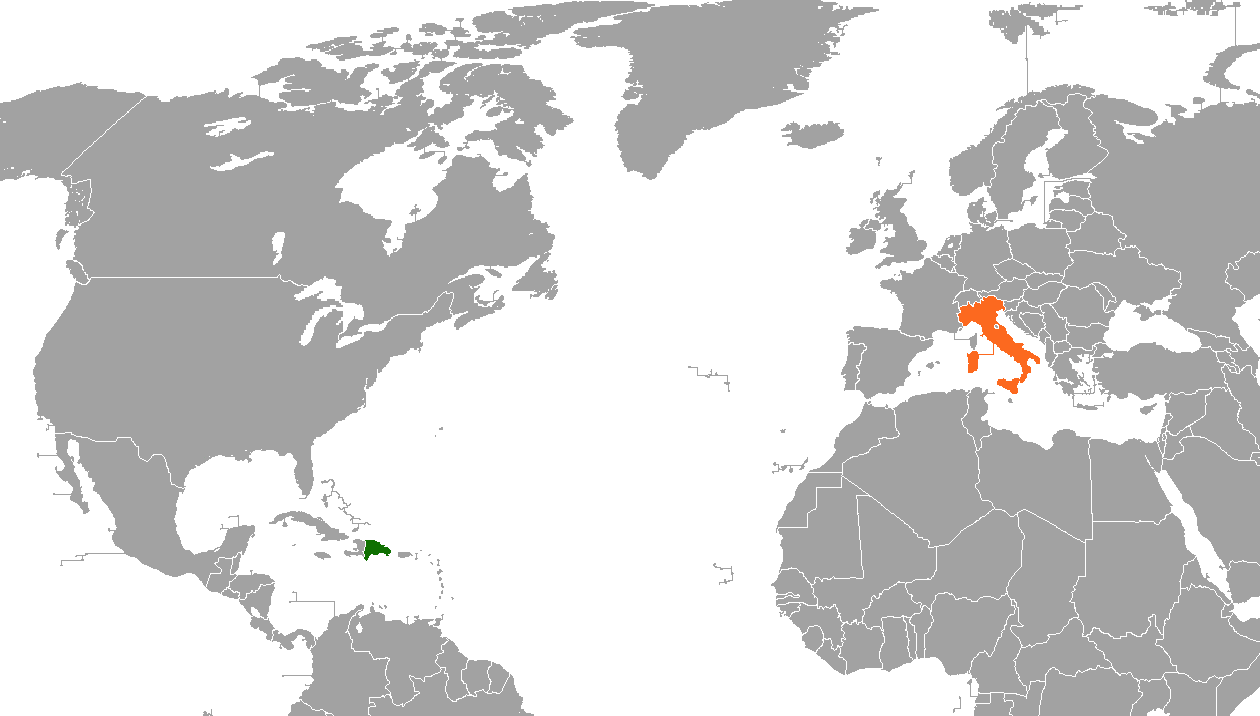
- Dominican Republic: Italy

Dominican Republic–Italy relations are the bilateral relations between The Dominican Republic and the Italian Republic. The Dominican Republic has an embassy in Rome and Italy has an embassy in Santo Domingo.

== History ==
On October 3, 2019, the Italian - Dominican Chamber of Commerce organized a meeting to discuss developing commercial and tourist relations between Italy and the DR. Italian Ambassador to the Dominican Republic, Andrea Canepari, hosted the meeting with several DR trade ministers present.

== Trade ==
Over $US400 million worth of products, goods and services is traded between the DR and Italy. The Italian Dominican Chamber of Commerce was organized to bolster trade relationships between both nations, particularly in exports and tourism. In 2019, Italy exported US$338 million to Dominican Republic, with the largest export being jewelry. The DR in the same year exported US$64 million to Italy, the largest export being Ferroalloys.

== Immigration ==
Dominicans in Italy started immigrating to Italy in the 1990s. By 2014, over 28,000 Dominicans lived in Italy, with the most common cities being La Spezia, Rome and Milan. In 2018, there were over 60,000 Dominicans in Italy, of which half had citizenship and nearly 300,000 people in the DR of Italian descent. Many Italian descended Dominicans have Italian passports.

== See also ==
- Dominican people in Italy
- Foreign relations of Italy
- Foreign relations of the Dominican Republic
- List of ambassadors of Italy to the Dominican Republic
