= Dominicans in Mexico =

Dominican Mexicans
Mexicanos dominicanos (Spanish)

Total population
- 2,849

Regions with significant populations
- Mexico City, Veracruz, Chiapas, Michoacán and Jalisco

Languages
- Spanish

Religion
- Roman Catholicism

According to the 2020 INEGI census, there are 2,849 Dominicans residing in Mexico. In 1990 there were just over 500 in the country. Among them are baseball players for Mexican professional teams.

== See also ==
- Dominican Republic–Mexico relations
