= Foreign relations of the Dominican Republic =

The foreign relations of the Dominican Republic are the Dominican Republic's relations with other governments.

The Dominican Republic has a close relationship with the United States and with the other states of the Inter-American system. It has accredited diplomatic missions in most Western Hemisphere countries and in European capitals.

== History ==
The island nation of the Dominican Republic maintains very limited relations with most of the countries of Africa, Asia, the Middle East, and Eastern Europe. It concentrated its diplomatic activities in four critical arenas: the circum-Caribbean, countries in the Americas, the United States, and Western Europe (mainly West Germany, Spain, and France).

== Diplomatic relations ==
List of countries which the Dominican Republic maintains diplomatic relations with:

#	Country	Date
1	United Kingdom	6 March 1850
2	Denmark	17 December 1851
3	France	8 May 1852
4	Italy	22 March 1854
5	Spain	18 February 1855
6	Netherlands	24 July 1856
7	Peru	6 April 1874
8	Haiti	9 November 1874
9	Costa Rica	10 August 1876
10	Honduras	17 December 1877
11	El Salvador	3 July 1882
12	Portugal	1 May 1883
13	United States	26 March 1884
14	Mexico	23 July 1888
15	Belgium	10 April 1891
16	Bolivia	30 January 1902
17	Paraguay	18 February 1902
18	Cuba	5 April 1904
19	Brazil	19 April 1911
20	Serbia	1 March 1912
21	Argentina	9 July 1920
22	Chile	6 January 1925
23	Uruguay	27 November 1925
24	Poland	18 November 1933
25	Japan	November 1934
26	Colombia	18 July 1936
27	Panama	24 March 1937
28	Ecuador	14 April 1937
29	Austria	2 March 1938
30	Sweden	16 July 1942
31	Czech Republic	7 October 1943
32	Norway	16 November 1943
33	Venezuela	12 January 1945
34	Russia	8 May 1945
35	Nicaragua	17 June 1949
36	Turkey	21 September 1950
37	Philippines	9 May 1953
38	Germany	11 September 1953
39	Canada	22 April 1954
—	Holy See	16 June 1954
40	Guatemala	31 August 1954
41	Israel	7 June 1955
42	Greece	16 October 1956
43	Switzerland	8 August 1957
—	Sovereign Military Order of Malta	1957
44	Iran	24 October 1958
45	Liberia	18 December 1958
46	Morocco	15 December 1960
47	Egypt	30 December 1960
48	Lebanon	1960
49	South Korea	6 June 1962
50	Jamaica	4 December 1964
51	Trinidad and Tobago	May 1968
52	Thailand	18 September 1969
53	Guyana	19 October 1970
54	Barbados	8 August 1972
55	Kuwait	18 October 1977
56	Suriname	1 March 1979
57	Cyprus	7 May 1981
58	Finland	2 January 1984
59	Romania	21 July 1984
60	Saint Lucia	1988
61	Bulgaria	14 June 1991
62	Bahamas	4 September 1991
63	Lithuania	2 May 1995
64	Namibia	7 February 1997
65	Australia	22 April 1997
66	Belize	6 November 1997
67	India	4 May 1999
68	Benin	24 November 1999
69	Equatorial Guinea	24 November 1999
70	Qatar	19 January 2000
71	Singapore	10 February 2000
72	Andorra	14 September 2000
73	North Macedonia	18 September 2000
74	Ukraine	21 September 2000
75	Croatia	5 February 2001
76	Slovakia	20 March 2001
77	Belarus	18 April 2001
78	Nigeria	23 July 2001
79	Latvia	15 August 2001
80	Malaysia	2001
81	South Africa	9 May 2002
82	Albania	27 May 2002
83	Estonia	18 November 2002
84	Hungary	7 March 2003
85	Slovenia	11 March 2003
86	Mauritius	30 April 2003
87	Iceland	23 June 2003
88	Luxembourg	25 May 2005
89	Vietnam	7 July 2005
90	Mali	15 September 2006
91	Botswana	6 October 2006
92	North Korea	24 September 2007
93	Sudan	24 September 2007
94	Algeria	26 September 2007
95	Democratic Republic of the Congo	26 September 2007
96	Ivory Coast	26 September 2007
97	Ethiopia	27 September 2007
98	Fiji	27 September 2007
99	Guinea-Bissau	27 September 2007
100	Laos	27 September 2007
101	Burkina Faso	28 September 2007
102	Cape Verde	28 September 2007
103	Eritrea	28 September 2007
104	Guinea	28 September 2007
105	Libya	28 September 2007
106	Nauru	28 September 2007
107	Nepal	28 September 2007
108	Syria	28 September 2007
109	Uzbekistan	28 September 2007
110	Antigua and Barbuda	5 October 2007
111	Armenia	9 October 2007
112	Kenya	9 October 2007
113	Eswatini	10 October 2007
114	Federated States of Micronesia	15 October 2007
115	Zimbabwe	15 October 2007
116	Bahrain	22 October 2007
117	Uganda	22 October 2007
118	Timor-Leste	24 October 2007
119	Azerbaijan	12 November 2007
120	Monaco	12 February 2008
121	Dominica	21 July 2008
122	Jordan	23 September 2008
123	Seychelles	23 September 2008
124	United Arab Emirates	12 November 2008
125	Cambodia	13 November 2008
126	Turkmenistan	9 February 2009
127	Montenegro	10 March 2009
128	Bosnia and Herzegovina	23 June 2009
129	Ireland	6 July 2009
—	State of Palestine	15 July 2009
130	Saint Vincent and the Grenadines	23 September 2009
131	Yemen	24 September 2009
132	Angola	25 September 2009
133	San Marino	25 September 2009
134	Georgia	22 January 2010
135	Maldives	17 March 2010
136	Oman	17 March 2010
137	Tajikistan	25 May 2010
138	Iraq	27 May 2010
139	Mongolia	27 May 2010
140	Brunei	10 August 2010
141	Sri Lanka	3 February 2011
142	Djibouti	8 March 2011
143	Kazakhstan	7 June 2011
144	Kyrgyzstan	30 June 2011
145	Indonesia	20 September 2011
146	Afghanistan	3 December 2011
147	Bangladesh	13 March 2012
148	Tuvalu	13 June 2012
149	Saudi Arabia	24 July 2012
150	New Zealand	26 June 2014
151	Saint Kitts and Nevis	21 September 2016
152	Malta	23 February 2017
153	China	1 May 2018
154	São Tomé and Príncipe	24 September 2018
155	Senegal	24 September 2018
156	Burundi	26 September 2018
157	Tunisia	27 September 2018
158	Niger	28 September 2018
159	Gambia	10 May 2019
160	Ghana	23 September 2019
161	Marshall Islands	23 September 2019
162	Liechtenstein	26 September 2019
163	Mozambique	26 September 2019
164	Republic of the Congo	16 October 2019
165	Gabon	17 March 2021
166	Moldova	30 March 2021
167	Samoa	23 September 2021
168	Grenada	27 September 2021
169	Sierra Leone	19 September 2022
170	Togo	20 September 2022
171	Rwanda	22 September 2022
172	Madagascar	23 September 2022
173	Pakistan	18 November 2022
174	Palau	15 February 2023
175	South Sudan	11 April 2023
176	Mauritania	19 September 2023
177	Solomon Islands	21 September 2023
178	Malawi	1 November 2023
179	Lesotho	2 November 2023
180	Vanuatu	14 November 2023
181	Tonga	29 February 2024
182	Kiribati	18 July 2024
183	Zambia	23 September 2024
184	Chad	27 July 2026
185	Somalia	23 September 2026

== Bilateral relations ==
=== Americas ===
Country	Formal Relations Began	Notes
Argentina	1925	Argentina has an embassy in Santo Domingo.; Dominican Republic has an embassy in Buenos Aires.
Brazil	21 April 1911	Brazil has an embassy in Santo Domingo.; Dominican Republic has an embassy in Brasília and consulates-general in Rio de Janeiro and São Paulo.
Canada	22 April 1954	See Canada-Dominican Republic relations: Canada has an embassy in Santo Domingo.; Dominican Republic has an embassy in Ottawa and two consulates-general in Montreal and Toronto.
Chile	1922	See Chile-Dominican Republic relations: Chile has an embassy in Santo Domingo.; Dominican Republic has an embassy in Santiago.
Cuba	5 April 1904, broken 26 June 1959, restored 16 April 1998	See Cuba-Dominican Republic relations On 26 June 1959, Cuba broke diplomatic relations with the Dominican Republic, citing, among other things, the latter's protection of "Batista war criminals," the sacking of the Cuban Embassy in Ciudad Trujillo, the preparation of a "counter-revolutionary force of 25,000 men" aimed against Cuba, insults against Cuba by the government-controlled press and radio and, especially, attacks by the Dominican Air Force on its own defenseless civilian population and the "torture and assassination of prisoners". The Dominican Republic and Cuba recently established consular relations, and there is contact in fields such as commerce, culture, and sports.: Cuba has an embassy in Santo Domingo.; Dominican Republic has an embassy in Havana.
Guyana	19 October 1970	Both countries established diplomatic relations on 19 October 1970.; Both countries are full members of the Organization of American States.
Haiti	26 July 1867	See Dominican Republic–Haiti relations: Dominican Republic has an embassy in Port-au-Prince and consulates-general in Anse-à-Pitres and Ouanaminthe and a consulate in Belladère.; Haiti has an embassy in Santo Domingo and consulates-general in Dajabón, Higüey, Santa Cruz de Barhona and Santiago de los Caballeros.
Honduras	18 September 1946	Dominican Republic has an embassy in Tegucigalpa.; Honduras has an embassy in Santo Domingo.
Jamaica	4 December 1964	Dominican Republic has an embassy in Kingston.; Jamaica has an embassy in Santo Domingo.
Mexico	11 July 1929	See Dominican Republic–Mexico relations Diplomatic relations between the Dominican Republic and Mexico were established on 11 July 1929.: Dominican Republic has an embassy in Mexico City.; Mexico has an embassy in Santo Domingo.
Puerto Rico (territory of the United States)		The Dominican Republic has very strong ties and relations with Puerto Rico, albeit not formal ones. Although a United States Commonwealth, Puerto Rico is the Dominican Republic's largest trading partner. While relations between the islands have had difficulties, mainly due to the huge exodus of illegal immigrants from the Dominican Republic due to the nation's history of economic woes, the islands still, with the assistance of the United States Coast Guard and the Dominican Navy have worked hard to reduce the number of Dominicans crossing the Mona Passage in recent years. Puerto Rico is home to an estimated 485,000 Dominicans, and the Dominican Republic maintains consulates in the cities of San Juan and Mayagüez.
Trinidad and Tobago	May 1968	See Dominican Republic-Trinidad and Tobago relations: Dominican Republic has an embassy in Port-of-Spain.; Trinidad and Tobago is accredited to the Dominican Republic from its high commission in Kingston, Jamaica.
United States	26 March 1884, broken 26 August 1960 - 6 January 1962	See Dominican Republic–United States relations The Dominican Republic's standing as the largest Caribbean economy, second-largest country in terms of population and land mass, with large bilateral trade with the United States, and its proximity to the United States and other smaller Caribbean nations make the Dominican Republic an important partner in hemispheric affairs. The Embassy estimates that 100,000 U.S. citizens live in the Dominican Republic; many are dual nationals. An important element of the relationship between the two countries is the fact that more than 1 million individuals of Dominican origin reside in the United States, most of them in the metropolitan Northeast and some in Florida. U.S. relations with the Dominican Republic are excellent. The Dominican Government has been supportive of many U.S. initiatives in the United Nations and related agencies. The two governments cooperate in the fight against the traffic in illegal substances. The Dominican Republic has worked closely with U.S. law enforcement officials on issues such as the extradition of fugitives and measures to hinder illegal migration. The United States supports efforts to improve Dominican competitiveness, to attract foreign private investment, to fight corruption, and to modernize the tax system. Bilateral trade is important to both countries. U.S. firms, mostly manufacturers of apparel, footwear, and light electronics, as well as U.S. energy companies, account for much of the foreign private investment in the Dominican Republic. Exports from the United States, including those from Puerto Rico and the U.S. Virgin Islands, to the Dominican Republic in 2005 totaled $5.3 billion, up 11% from the previous year. The Dominican Republic exported $4.5 billion to the United States in 2006, equaling some 75% of its export revenues. The Dominican Republic is the 47th-largest commercial partner of the U.S. The U.S. Embassy works closely with U.S. business firms and Dominican trade groups, both of which can take advantage of the new opportunities in this growing market. At the same time, the embassy is working with the Dominican Government to resolve a range of ongoing commercial and investment disputes. The Embassy counsels U.S. firms through its Country Commercial Guide and informally via meetings with business persons planning to invest or already investing in the Dominican Republic. This is a challenging business environment for U.S. firms, especially for medium to smaller sized businesses. The U.S. Agency for International Development (USAID) mission is focused on improving access of underserved populations to quality health care and combating HIV/AIDS and tuberculosis; promoting economic growth through policy reform, support for CAFTA-DR implementation, and technical assistance to small producers and tourism groups; environmental protection and policy reform initiatives; improved access to quality primary, public education and assistance to at-risk youth; a model rural electrification program; and improving participation in democratic processes, while strengthening the judiciary and combating corruption across all sectors.: Dominican Republic has an embassy in Washington, D.C. and consulates-general in Boston, Chicago, Los Angeles, Miami, New Orleans, New York City, San Juan and Mayagüez.; United States has an embassy in Santo Domingo.
Uruguay	27 November 1925	See Dominican Republic–Uruguay relations: Dominican Republic has an embassy in Montevideo.; Uruguay has an embassy in Santo Domingo.
Venezuela	31 March 1936 and 12 January 1945-Joint Communique	The Dominican Republic and Venezuela have kept a very close relationship throughout the early 2000s. Currently, Venezuela is the biggest seller of oil to the Dominican Republic. In 2003, Venezuela was selling to the Dominican Republic approximately 110,000 barrels of oil per day, making for more than 75% of the daily oil consumption in the country, including cars, factories, and electrical plants. Today, the Dominican Republic gets around 50,000 barrels of oil a day from Venezuela under the Petrocaribe agreement, which includes most of the Caribbean countries. Due to the Dominican economy, the country cannot afford all this oil through cash, so to pay Venezuela for the oil, the Dominican Government makes payments not only in cash, but also by exporting goods like black beans to Venezuela and other things like selling bonds. The Dominican Government has to export so many beans to Venezuela, Over 10,000 tons, that it had to start to import some beans from foreign countries to provide the population with beans. In January 2015, the Dominican Government raised almost 2 billion dollars to pay off part of the debt they owed to Venezuela. The Dominican Republic currently represents a 1.5 billion dollar year revenue to Venezuela just in the oil business itself, which is the reason why the Dominican Republic and Venezuela government have such a strong connection now that both countries are getting what they need from each other.: Dominican Republic has an embassy in Caracas.; Venezuela has an embassy in Santo Domingo.

=== Asia ===
Country	Formal Relations Began	Notes
China	1 May 2018	See China–Dominican Republic relations and Dominican Republic–Taiwan relations The Dominican Republic used to keep official relations with Taiwan, officially the Republic of China (ROC). On 1 May 2018, the Dominican Republic's government announced that diplomatic relations with Taiwan is severed and diplomatic ties with People's Republic of China is established, and recognize Taiwan as an "inalienable part of Chinese territory".: China has an embassy in Santo Domingo.; Dominican Republic has an embassy in Beijing.
India	4 May 1999	See Dominican Republic–India relations: India has an honorary consulate in Santo Domingo.; Dominican Republic maintains an embassy in New Delhi.
Israel	11 July 1955	Israel had provided aid and technical assistance and maintained some commercial, cultural, and diplomatic ties; in return, the Israelis often counted on the Dominican Republic to support their positions in international fora.: Israel has an embassy in Santo Domingo.; Dominican Republic has an embassy in Tel Aviv.
Philippines	6 July 1946	Philippines is accredited to the Dominican Republic from its embassy in Mexico City, Mexico.; Dominican Republic is accredited to the Philippines from its embassy in New Delhi, India.
South Korea	6 June 1962	The establishment of diplomatic relations between the Republic of Korea and the Dominican Republic began on 6 June 1962.: South Korea has an embassy in Santo Domingo.; Dominican Republic has an embassy in Seoul.
Turkey	28 November 1951	See Dominican Republic–Turkey relations: Turkey has an embassy in Santo Domingo.; Trade volume between the two countries was US$132.7 million in 2019 (Dominican exports/imports: 14.1/118.6 million USD).
Vietnam	7 July 2005	Vietnam is accredited to the Dominican Republic from its embassy in Havana, Cuba.; Dominican Republic has an embassy in Hanoi.

=== Europe ===
Country	Formal Relations Began	Notes
Belgium	10 April 1891	Belgium is accredited to the Dominican Republic from its embassy in Kingston, Jamaica.; Dominican Republic has an embassy in Brussels and a consulate-general in Antwerp.
France	22 September 1850	Dominican Republic has an embassy in Paris and consulates-general in Marseille and Pointe-à-Pitre.; France has an embassy in Santo Domingo.
Germany	30 January 1885	See Dominican Republic–Germany relations: Dominican Republic has an embassy in Berlin.; Germany has an embassy in Santo Domingo.
Italy	22 March 1854	See Dominican Republic–Italy relations: Dominican Republic has an embassy in Rome and consulates-general in Genoa and Milan.; Italy has an embassy in Santo Domingo.; There are around 300,000 people of Italian descent living in the Dominican Republic (see Italian Dominicans)
Holy See	1881	Dominican Republic has an embassy in Rome accredited to the Holy See.; Holy See has an apostolic nunciature in Santo Domingo.
Netherlands	30 November 1853	Dominican Republic has an embassy in The Hague and consulates-general in Amsterdam, Willemstad and Philipsburg, Sint Maarten.; Netherlands has an embassy in Santo Domingo.
Romania	21 July 1984	Dominican Republic is accredited to Romania from its embassy in Rome, Italy.; Romania is accredited to the Dominican Republic from its embassy in Bogotá, Colombia, and has an honorary consulate in Santo Domingo.
Russia	8 March 1945, broken 3 January 1955, restored 18 March 1991	Russia is accredited to the Dominican Republic from its embassy in Caracas, Venezuela.; Dominican Republic has an embassy in Moscow.
Spain	18 February 1855	See Dominican Republic–Spain relations: Dominican Republic has an embassy in Madrid, consulates-general in Barcelona and Santa Cruz de Tenerife and consulates in Seville and Valencia.; Spain has an embassy in Santo Domingo.
Switzerland	28 March 1927	See Dominican Republic-Switzerland relations: Dominican Republic has an embassy in Bern and a consulate-general in Zürich.; Switzerland has an embassy in Santo Domingo.
United Kingdom	5 March 1850	See Dominican Republic–United Kingdom relations Dominican Republic Foreign Minister Carlos Morales Troncoso with British Foreign Secretary William Hague in London, June 2012. The Dominican Republic established diplomatic relations with the United Kingdom on 6 March 1850.: Dominican Republic maintains an embassy in London.; The United Kingdom is accredited to Dominican Republic from its embassy in Santo Domingo.; Both countries share common membership of the Atlantic Co-operation Pact, the International Criminal Court, the United Nations, and the World Trade Organization, as well as the CARIFORUM–UK Economic Partnership Agreement. Bilaterally the two countries have a Maritime Boundary Agreement. The United Kingdom was the first country recognise and establish diplomatic relations with the Dominican Republic.

=== Multilateral relations ===
The Dominican Republic is a founding member of the United Nations and many of its specialized and related agencies, including the World Bank, International Labour Organization, International Atomic Energy Agency, and International Civil Aviation Organization. It also is a member of the OAS, World Trade Organization, World Health Organization, World Customs Organization the Inter-American Development Bank, Central American Integration System, and ACP Group.

== See also ==
- List of diplomatic missions in the Dominican Republic
- List of diplomatic missions of the Dominican Republic
