= Colombia–Dominican Republic relations =

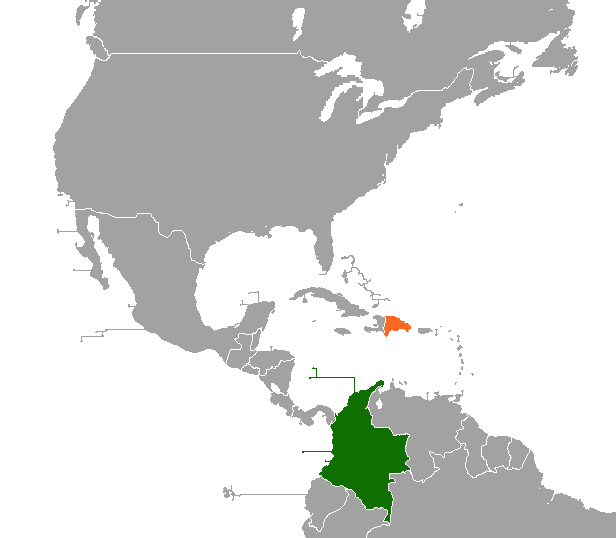
- Colombia: Dominican Republic

Diplomatic mission
- Embassy of Colombia in Santo Domingo: Embassy of the Dominican Republic in Bogotá

Colombia–Dominican Republic relations are diplomatic relations between the Republic of Colombia and the Dominican Republic. Both governments have maintained a friendly relationship since the 20th century. Both nations are members of the Association of Caribbean States, Community of Latin American and Caribbean States, Organization of American States, Organization of Ibero-American States and the United Nations.

== History ==
Both governments established diplomatic relations in 1936 and a border treaty was signed in 1978.

== Border ==
The border between Colombia and the Dominican Republic is an international maritime boundary that runs through the Caribbean Sea, defined by the Liévano-Jiménez Treaty, signed on January 13, 1978, in Santo Domingo by the foreign ministers of both countries, Indalecio Liévano Aguirre for Colombia and Ramón Emilio Jiménez for the Dominican Republic, and approved by the Congress of the Republic of Colombia on December 12, 1978, through Law No. 38. This agreement establishes the existence of a Common Scientific Research and Fisheries Exploitation Zone, in which each country has fishing rights and research rights relating to living resources.

The border between the two countries is defined by the principle of the median line, whose points are equidistant from the nearest baselines, from which the width of the territorial sea of each state is measured. The delimitation consists of 2 sections:

- From the point coordinates 15°02′00″N 73°27′30″W, where the border with Haiti ends, to the point 15°00′40″N 71°40′30″W. Both points frame the Common Fishing Area.
- From the previous point, a straight line is drawn to the coordinates 15°18′00″N 69°29′30″W. Due to the impossibility of an agreement on marine areas between Colombia and Venezuela, this section is called "Projection" since the latter country, following in the footsteps of Colombia, signed a treaty on March 3, 1979, whose layout overlaps the Colombian-Dominican border.

== Economic relations ==
Colombia exported products worth 91,162 thousand dollars, the main products being chemical, coal and agro-industrial products, while the Dominican Republic exported products worth 18,583 thousand dollars, the main products being cosmetics, petroleum derivatives and chemicals.

== Transport ==
There are direct flights between both nations with AraJet, Avianca and Wingo.

== Diplomatic representation ==
- Colombia has an embassy in Santo Domingo.
- Dominican Republic has an embassy in Bogotá.

== See also ==
- Foreign relations of Colombia
- Foreign relations of the Dominican Republic
