= Indians in the Dominican Republic =

Total population
- 54 (2020)

Regions with significant populations
- Santo Domingo

Languages
- Dominican Spanish; Indian languages; English

Religion
- Hinduism; Christianity; Islam; · Religions of India

Related ethnic groups
- Indo-Caribbean

Indians in the Dominican Republic (Spanish: Dominicanos Indios) consist of a number of expatriates and immigrants from India and their locally born descendants. As of 2020, there are about 54 people of Indian ancestry living the country.

In recent years, Indian students have started joining medical courses in the Dominican Republic and engineers and IT professionals are trickling in as major companies have set up shop on the island. There is also a small, but dominant Gujarati business community mainly engaged in the hotel and jewellery industry. Swaminarayan practitioners have become more common on the island due to an outreach program.

== India-Hermanas Mirabal Friendship Day ==
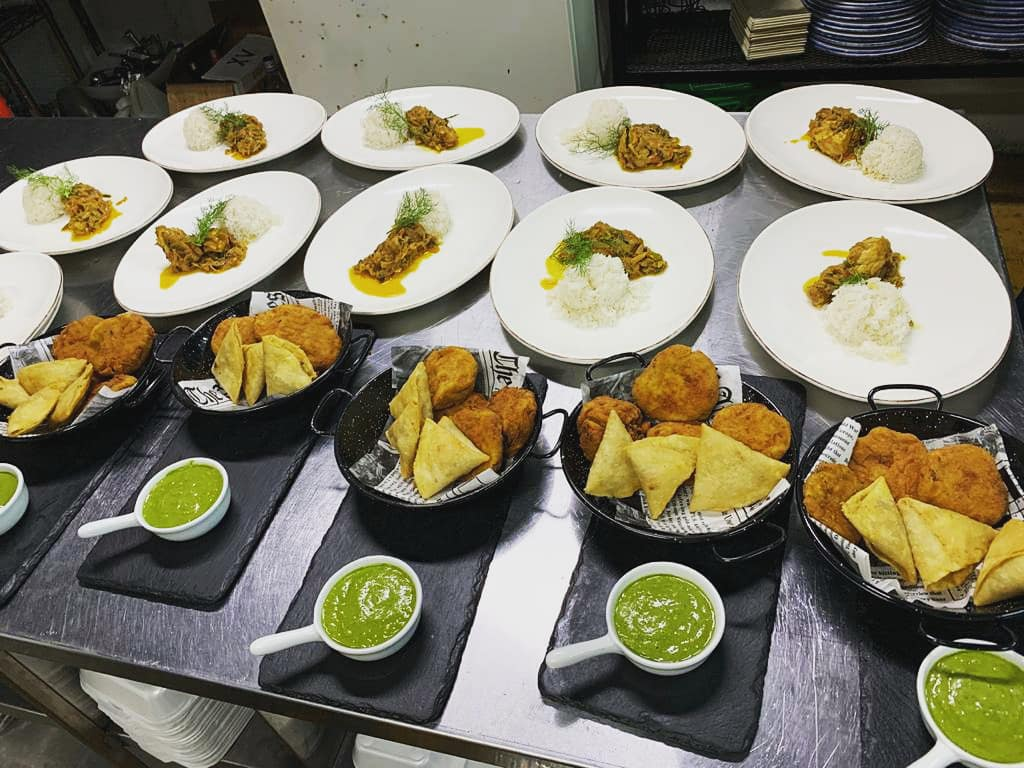
Indian food served at the festival.

On 25 January 2019, the Hermanas Mirabal Province of Salcedo has proclaimed a day honouring the Indian population in the Province. The festivities were organized by the Amistad India- Hermanas Mirabal Foundation led by Indian nationals and friends of India with the help of Oficina Technica Provincial. Various cultural activities were performed by the students of Liceo Cientifico Dr Miguel Canela Lazaro.

The second rendition of the India-Hermanas Mirabal friendship day was celebrated on 8 February 2020. Many cultural programs including music, dance and gastronomic experiences were included. Many school kids from the Province has showcased cultural programs and yoga demonstration. The Hermanas Mirabal Province is a multicultural province that houses many nationalities including a few Indian citizens. The Indian Ambassador in Havana, Ms Madhu Seti and the Dominican Ambassador to India, Mr Hans Dannenberg Castellanos recognized the hospitality extended by the Province through video messages. The President of Indian Chamber of Commerce in the Dominican Republic, Mr Dharmendra Basita presided over the festivities.

== See also ==
- Asian Latin American
- Indo-Haitian
- Dominican Republic–India relations
