= Dominican Republic–Trinidad and Tobago relations =

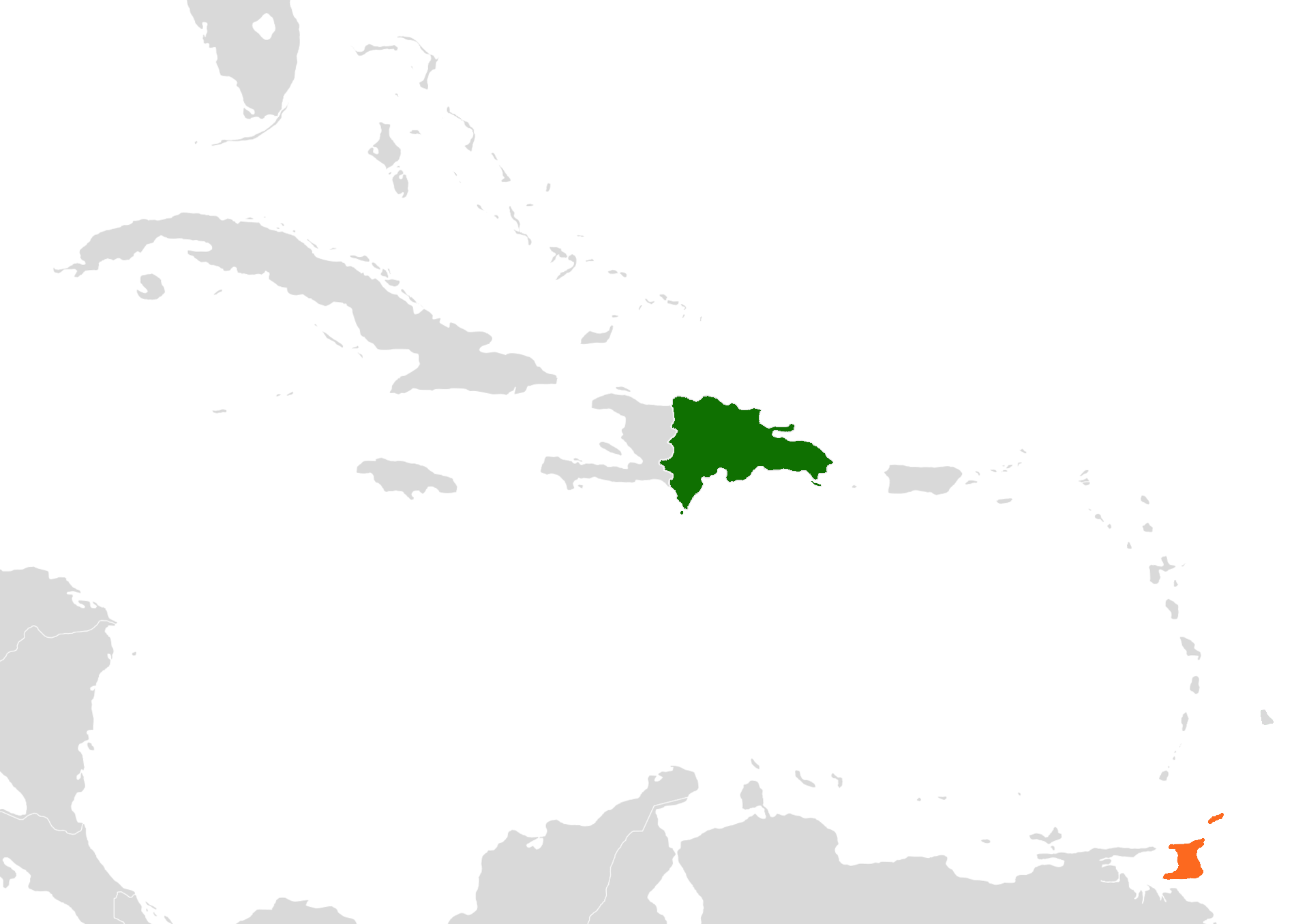

- Dominican Republic: Trinidad and Tobago

Dominican Republic–Trinidad and Tobago relations refers to the bilateral relations between the Dominican Republic and the Republic of Trinidad and Tobago. Dominican Republic operates an Embassy in Port of Spain and Trinidad and Tobago operates a Consulate in Santo Domingo. Both countries are members of CARICOM and Organization of American States.

== History ==
In 2021, Minister of Trade and Industry Paula Gopee-Scoon discussed developing stronger trade and economic relations with DR ambassador Wellington Darío Bencosme Casataños. Gopee-Scoon indicated that T&T was seeking to increase its non-energy exports to the DR.

On May 25, 2026, Trinidad and Tobago and the Dominican Republic signed a bilateral Air Services Agreement at the Ministry of Foreign Affairs of the Dominican Republic in Santo Domingo. Signed by Trinidadian Transport Minister Eli Zakour and Dominican Foreign Minister Roberto Álvarez, the agreement established a regulatory framework to govern direct air transportation services, aimed at enhancing aviation connectivity

== Trade ==
T&T became a net exporter to the Dominican Republic in 2016. In 2020, Trinidad and Tobago exported US$302 million worth of products to the DR. In the same year, the Dominican Republic exported US$254 million to Trinidad and Tobago. The most common products exported to the Dominican Republic were glass bottles, food stuff and urea. The top imports from the DR were fruits, tobacco and plastic packaging.

In 2024, bilateral trade between Trinidad and Tobago and the Dominican Republic reached approximately $449.5 million, with Trinidad and Tobago maintaining a trade surplus of $345 million. Exports from Trinidad and Tobago to the Dominican Republic totaled $397 million, led by petroleum ($343 million), nitrogenous fertilizers ($27.2 million), and prepared cereals ($10.7 million). Conversely, the Dominican Republic exported $52.5 million to Trinidad and Tobago, consisting primarily of bananas ($5.13 million), raw plastic sheeting ($4.04 million), and plastic housewares ($3.9 million).

== See also ==
- Foreign relations of the Dominican Republic
- Foreign relations of Trinidad and Tobago
- People of the Dominican Republic
