= List of diplomatic missions in the Dominican Republic =

This is a list of diplomatic missions in the Dominican Republic. There are currently 38 embassies in Santo Domingo.

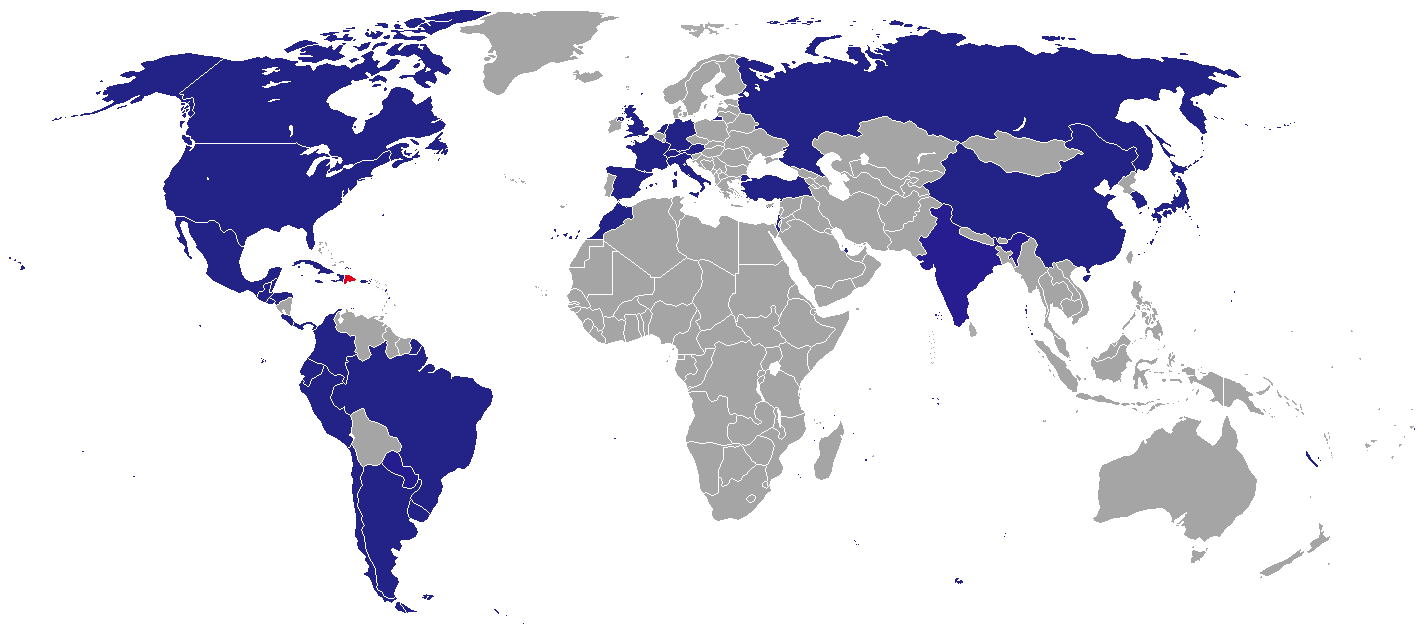
Countries with a diplomatic mission in the Dominican Republic

== Diplomatic missions in Santo Domingo ==
=== Embassies ===
1. Argentina
2. Belize
3. Brazil
4. Canada
5. Chile
6. China
7. Colombia
8. Costa Rica
9. Cuba
10. Ecuador
11. El Salvador
12. France
13. Germany
14. Guatemala
15. Haiti
16. Holy See
17. Honduras
18. India
19. Israel
20. Italy
21. Jamaica
22. Japan
23. Mexico
24. Morocco
25. Netherlands
26. Panama
27. Paraguay
28. Peru
29. Qatar
30. Russia
31. South Korea
32. Sovereign Military Order of Malta
33. Spain
34. Switzerland
35. Turkey
36. United Kingdom
37. United States
38. Uruguay

=== Other missions or delegations ===
1. Austria (Embassy Office)
2. European Union (Delegation)
3. Puerto Rico (Trade Office)

== Gallery of embassies ==
Embassy of the People's Republic of China

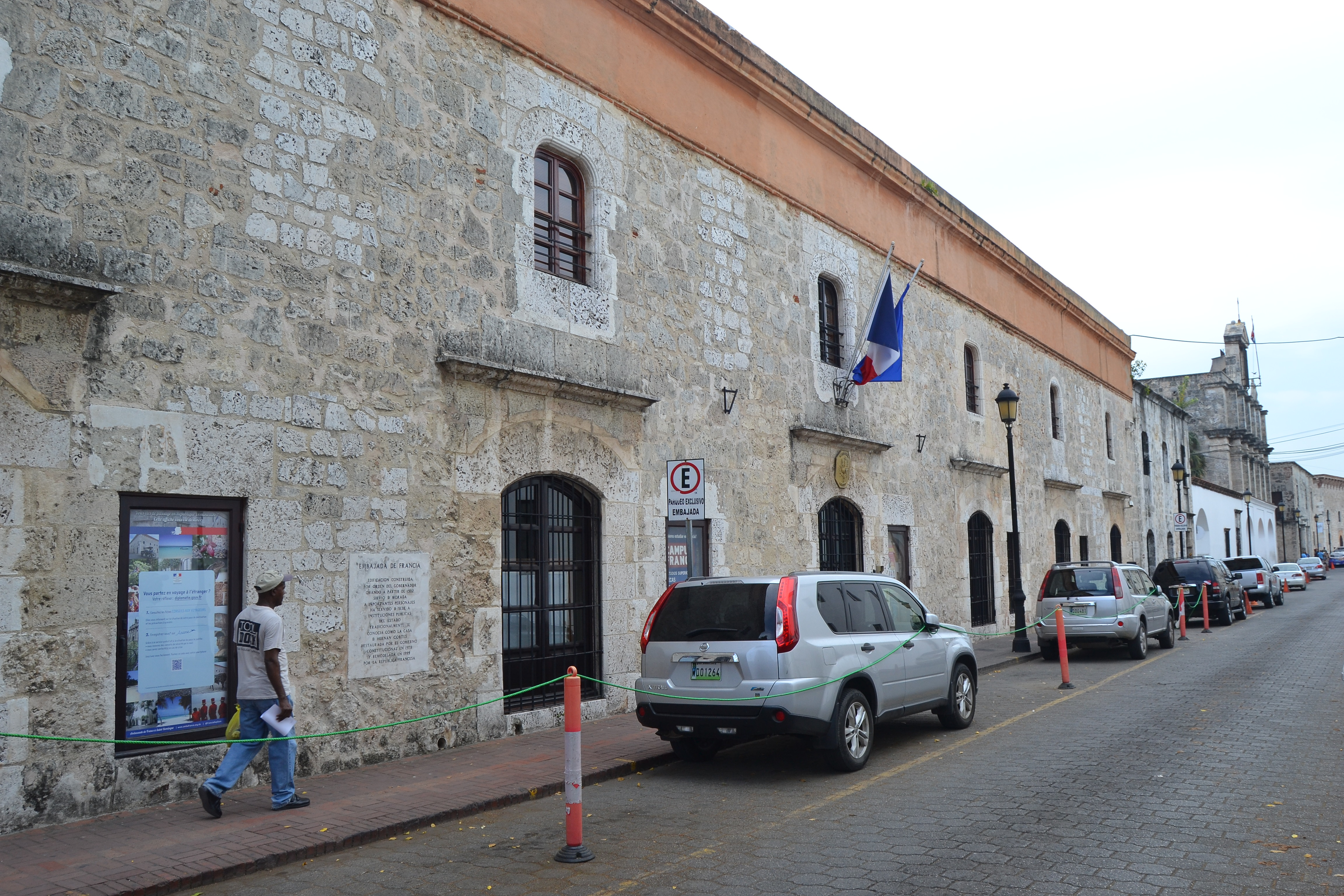
Former Embassy of France

Embassy of Guatemala

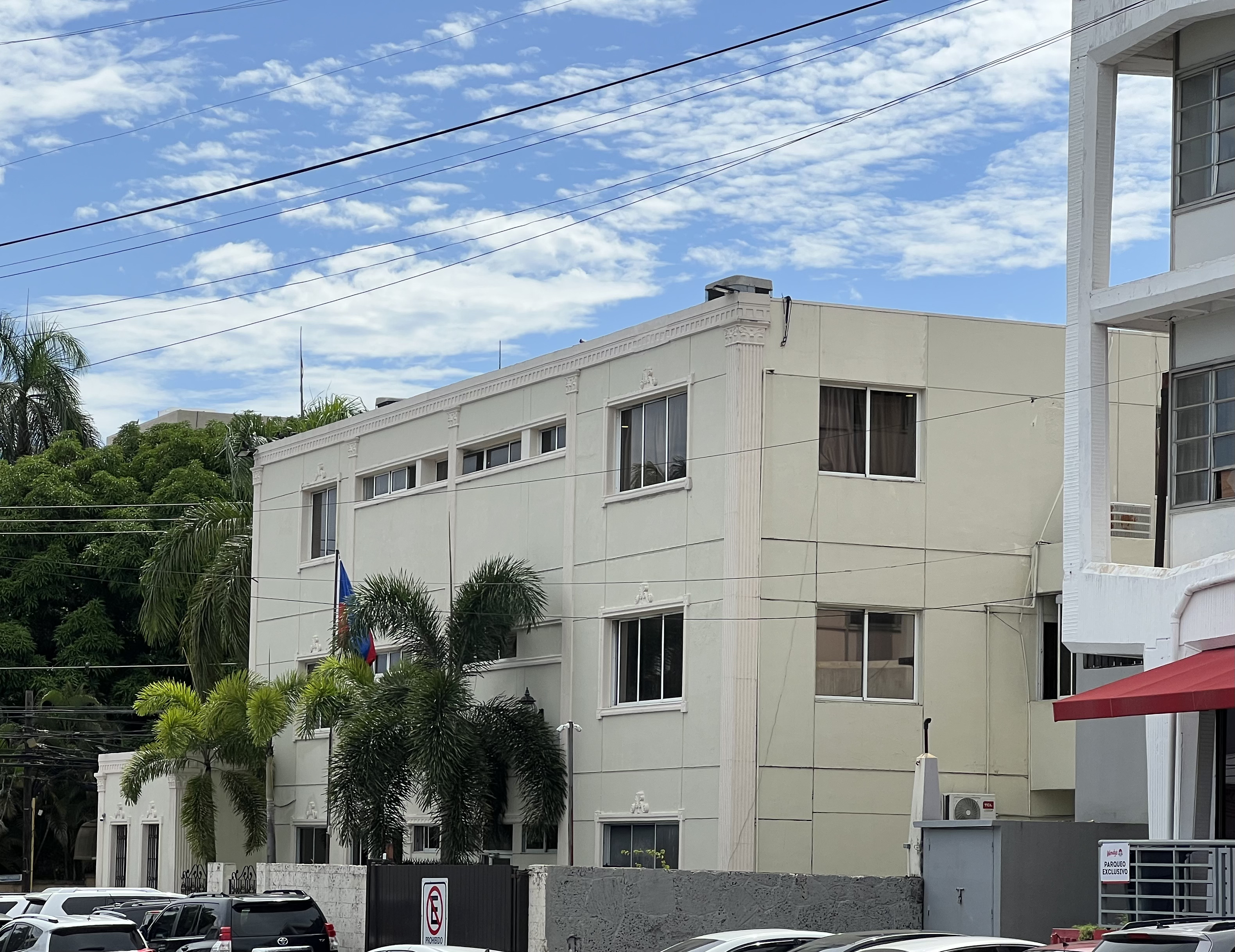
Embassy of Haiti

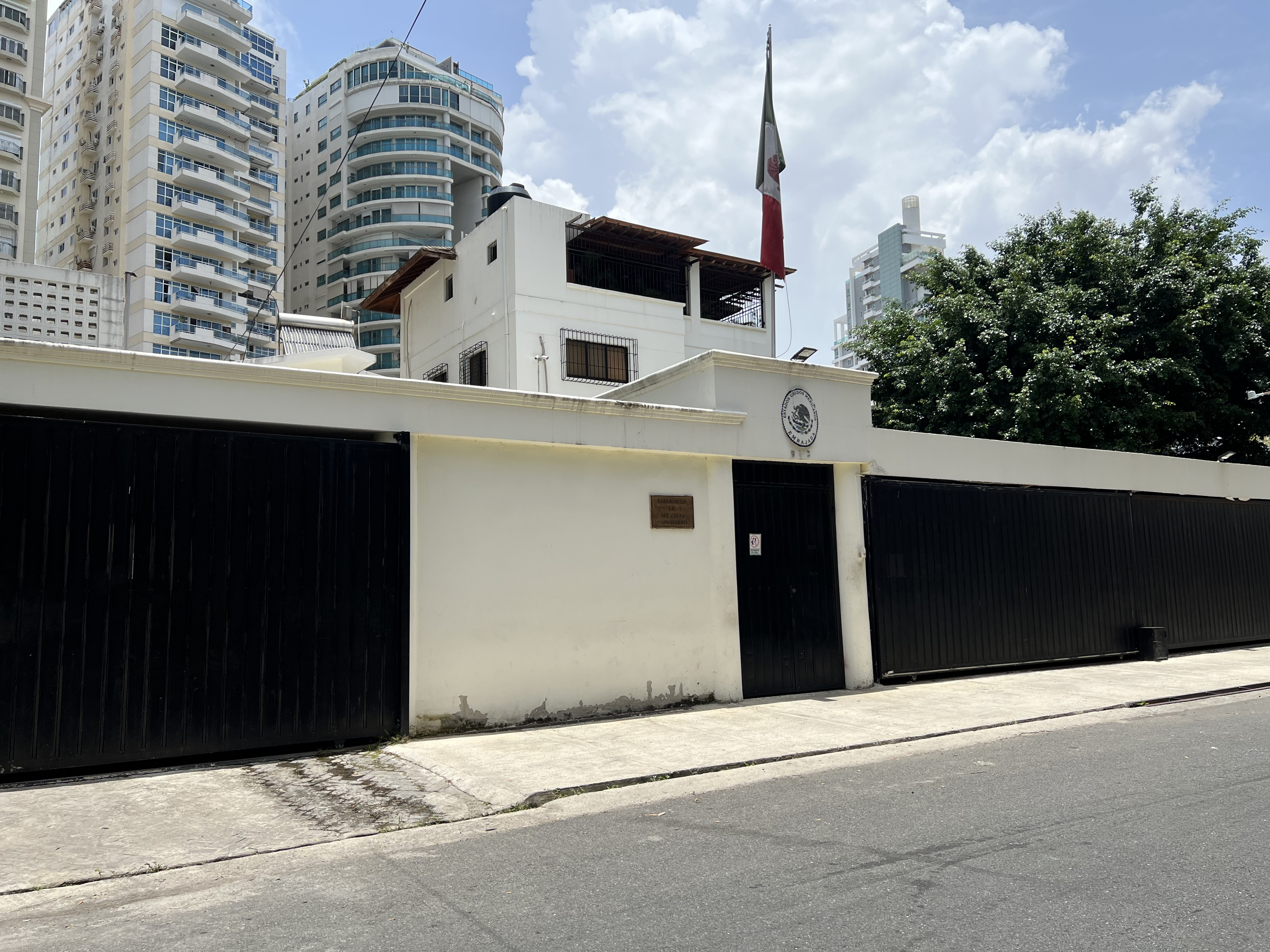
Embassy of Mexico

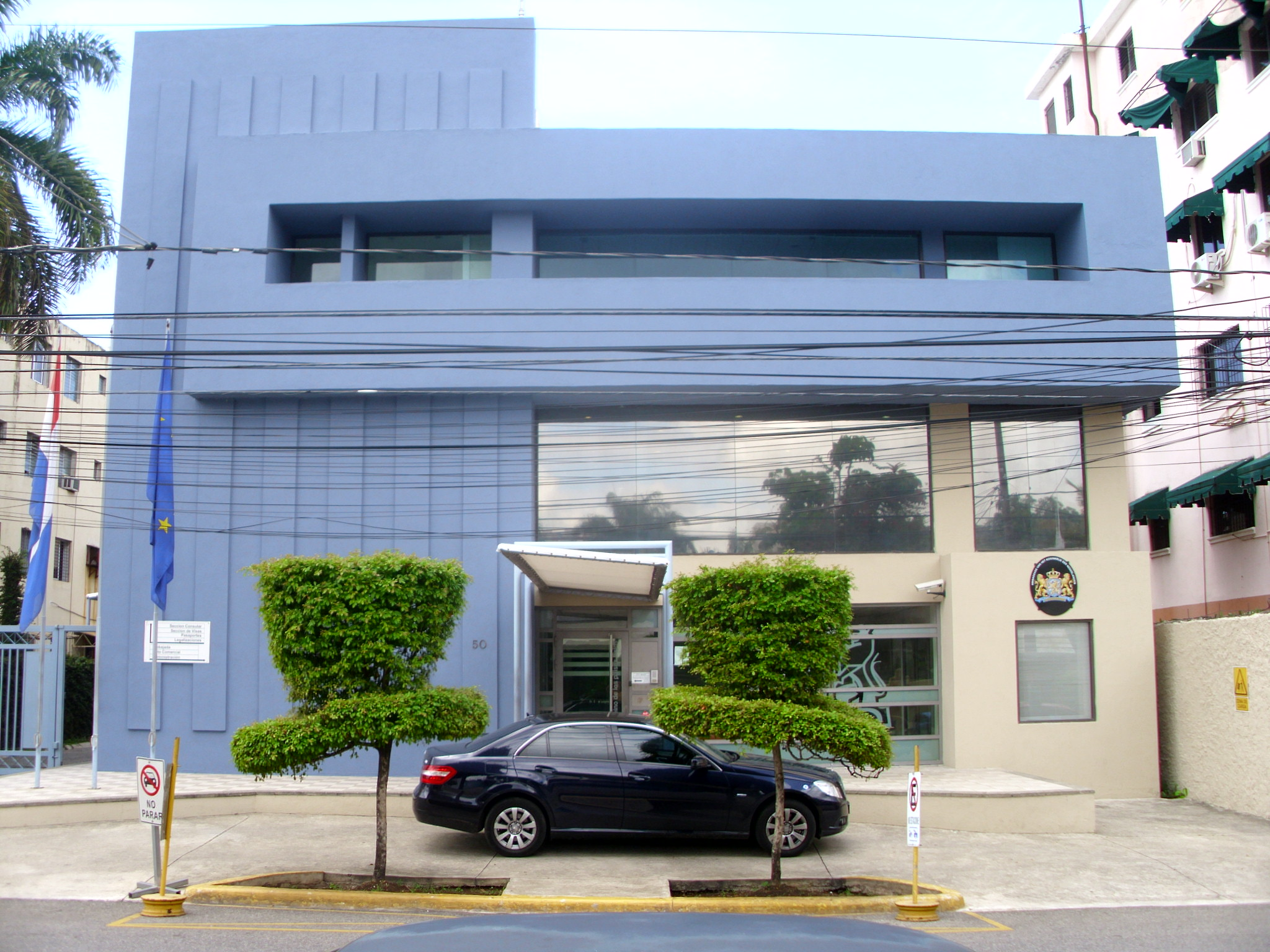
Former Embassy of the Netherlands

Embassy of the United States

== Consular missions ==
=== Dajabón ===
- Haiti (Consulate-General)

=== Higüey ===
- Haiti (Consulate-General)

=== Puerto Plata ===
- United States (Consular Agency)

=== Punta Cana ===
- Canada (Office of the Embassy)
- United States (Consular Agency)

=== Santa Cruz de Barahona ===
- Haiti (Consulate-General)

=== Santiago de los Caballeros ===
- Haiti (Consulate-General)

== Non-resident embassies ==
=== Resident in Havana, Cuba ===
- Angola
- Austria
- Barbados
- Belarus
- Belgium
- Benin
- Bolivia
- Bulgaria
- Burkina Faso
- Cape Verde
- Cyprus
- Czech Republic
- Egypt
- Djibouti
- Equatorial Guinea
- Ethiopia
- Ghana
- Greece
- Guinea
- Guinea-Bissau
- Guyana
- Hungary
- Indonesia
- Iran
- Malaysia
- Mali
- Mongolia
- Namibia
- North Korea
- Norway
- Saudi Arabia
- Serbia
- Slovakia
- South Africa
- Sri Lanka
- Sweden
- Vietnam
- Yemen
- Zimbabwe

=== Resident in Mexico City, Mexico ===
- Australia
- Denmark
- Georgia
- Philippines
- Kazakhstan
- Portugal
- New Zealand

=== Resident in New York City, United States ===
- Burundi
- Croatia
- Iceland
- Jordan
- Palestine
- Seychelles

=== Resident in Ottawa, Canada ===
- Armenia
- Rwanda
- Senegal
- Slovenia
- Thailand

=== Resident in Washington, D.C., United States ===
- Afghanistan
- Bahrain
- Albania
- Bangladesh
- Botswana
- Ivory Coast
- Mauritius
- Pakistan
- United Arab Emirates

=== Resident elsewhere ===
- Algeria (Caracas)
- Bahamas (Port-au-Prince)
- Finland (Bogotá)
- Ireland (Bogotá)
- Kenya (Kingston)
- Lebanon (Caracas)
- Nigeria (Kingston)
- Poland (Panama City)
- Romania (Bogotá)
- San Marino (Rome)
- Trinidad & Tobago (Kingston)

== Former Embassies ==
- Nicaragua
- Republic of China (Taiwan)
- Venezuela

== See also ==
- Foreign relations of the Dominican Republic
