= Cuba–Dominican Republic relations =

- Cuba: Dominican Republic

Cuba–Dominican Republic relations refers to the bilateral relations between the Dominican Republic and the Republic of Cuba. The Dominican Republic has an Embassy in Havana and Cuba has an Embassy in Santo Domingo.

== History ==
Both countries were originally colonies of Spain and had slaves imported from West Africa to provide labor for plantations. As a result, both countries have similar demographics.

In 1947, Castro enlisted to join the Cayo Confites, a paramilitary organization dedicated to toppling Rafael Trujillo. Castro's actions would later serve as one of the reasons why Trujillo broke off relations with Cuba in 1958. After Trujillo was deposed, Relations steadily warmed through various sport and cultural exchanges. In the 1980s, informal communications began between representatives of both governments to discuss the possibility of re-establishing relations. In 1998, both countries agreed to re-open their consulates. Fidel Castro attended the opening of the Cuban Consulate in Santo Domingo. The United States at the time, strongly disapproved of the re-opening of diplomatic relations and several protests occurred in the US in favor of opening relations and removing sanctions against Cuba. In 1999, Castro visited Dominican Republic again to inaugurate the polytechnic Maximo Gomez that was donated by Havana.

On 13 August 2026, the Dominican Republic ordered the expulsion of 9 Cuban diplomats and their families without giving a reason. Cuba strongly condemned the decision and called it an act of submission to the US policies regarding Cuba in light of the ongoing energy and financial blockade.

== Trade ==
In 2015, The Dominican Republic exported US$61m worth of goods while importing US$38m. The Dominican Republic's exports to Cuba grew by 70% between 2010 and 2015, while Cuban exports grew by 38% over the same period.

In 2018, Cuba and the Dominican Republic formalized a trade deal to reduce tariffs for products being shipped between them. In addition, the trade deal includes reducing trade barriers and creating a set standard for certain regulations in trade to allow easier trade. The agreement was signed in Santo Domingo by Dominican Foreign Minister Miguel Vargas Maldonado and Cuban Foreign Trade Minister Rodrigo Malmierca.

== See also ==
- Foreign relations of Cuba
- Foreign relations of the Dominican Republic
