= Chile–Dominican Republic relations =

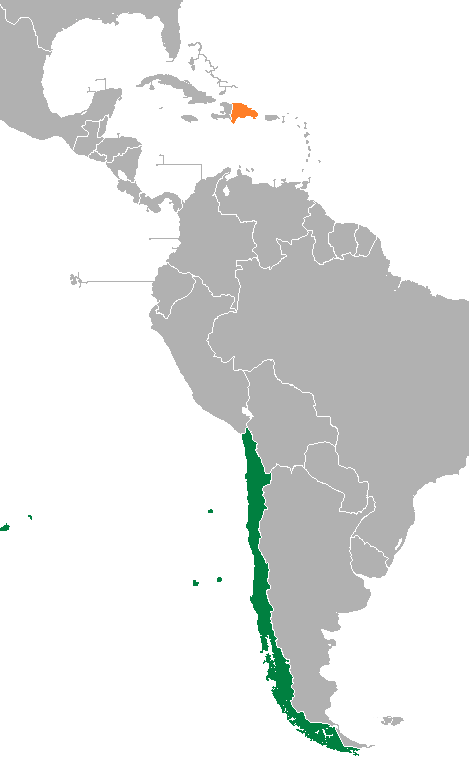
- Chile: Dominican Republic

Chile–Dominican Republic relations are the bilateral relations between the Republic of Chile and The Dominican Republic.

== History ==
In 1866, the DR recognized the legitimacy of Chile government and formally reached out to them. On May 14 1867, Álvaro Covarrubias Ortúzar, Minister of Foreign Affairs for Chile, established formal relations with the Dominican Republic by creating a consulate in Santo Domingo. In 2018, Chilean Foreign Minister Roberto Ampuero visited Santo Domingo to discuss developing economic cooperation and bolstering commercial development between both nations.

== Tourism ==
110,000 Chileans visited Dominican Republic for tourism in 2019, becoming one of the largest groups of tourists to the country. There are direct flights between Santiago and Punta Cana with LATAM Chile.

== Trade ==
Chilean exports to the DR have increased from US$28 million to US$78 million from 2000 to 2018. Dominican Republic exported US$11.3 million worth of goods to Chile in 2019, with the largest export being hard liquor. Chile, in the same year, exported US$76.5 million to the DR, with the largest exports being cars.

== Immigration ==
17,959 Dominicans lived in Chile as of 2019.

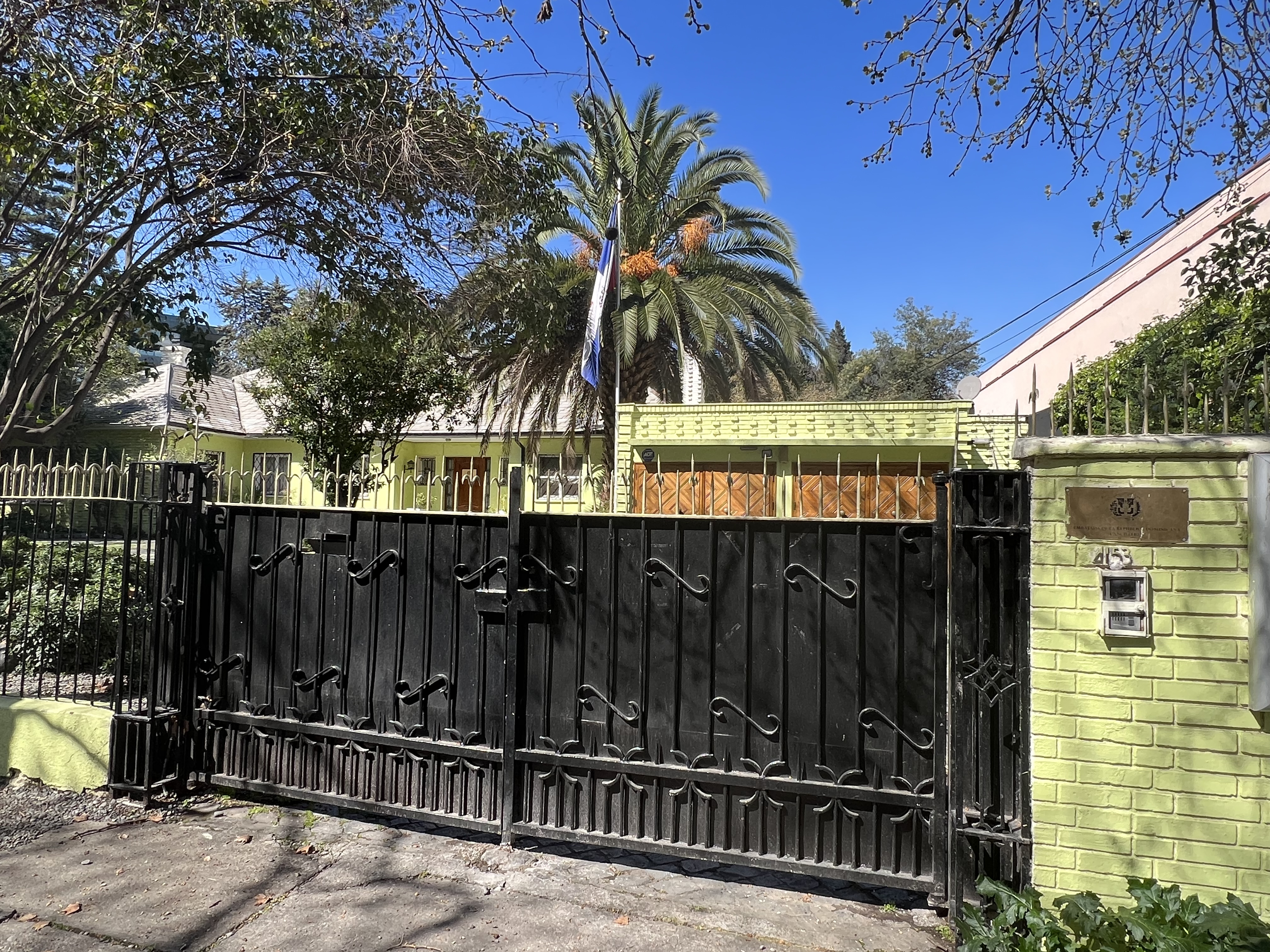
Embassy of the Dominican Republic in Santiago

== Resident diplomatic missions ==
- Chile has an embassy in Santo Domingo.
- Dominican Republic has an embassy in Santiago.

== See also ==
- Foreign relations of Chile
- Foreign relations of the Dominican Republic
