= Dominican Republic–United States relations =

- Dominican Republic: United States

Dominican Republic–United States relations are bilateral relations between the Dominican Republic and the United States of America. There are around 200,000 Americans expats in the Dominican Republic, and a little over 2 million Dominicans live in the United States.

== Overview ==
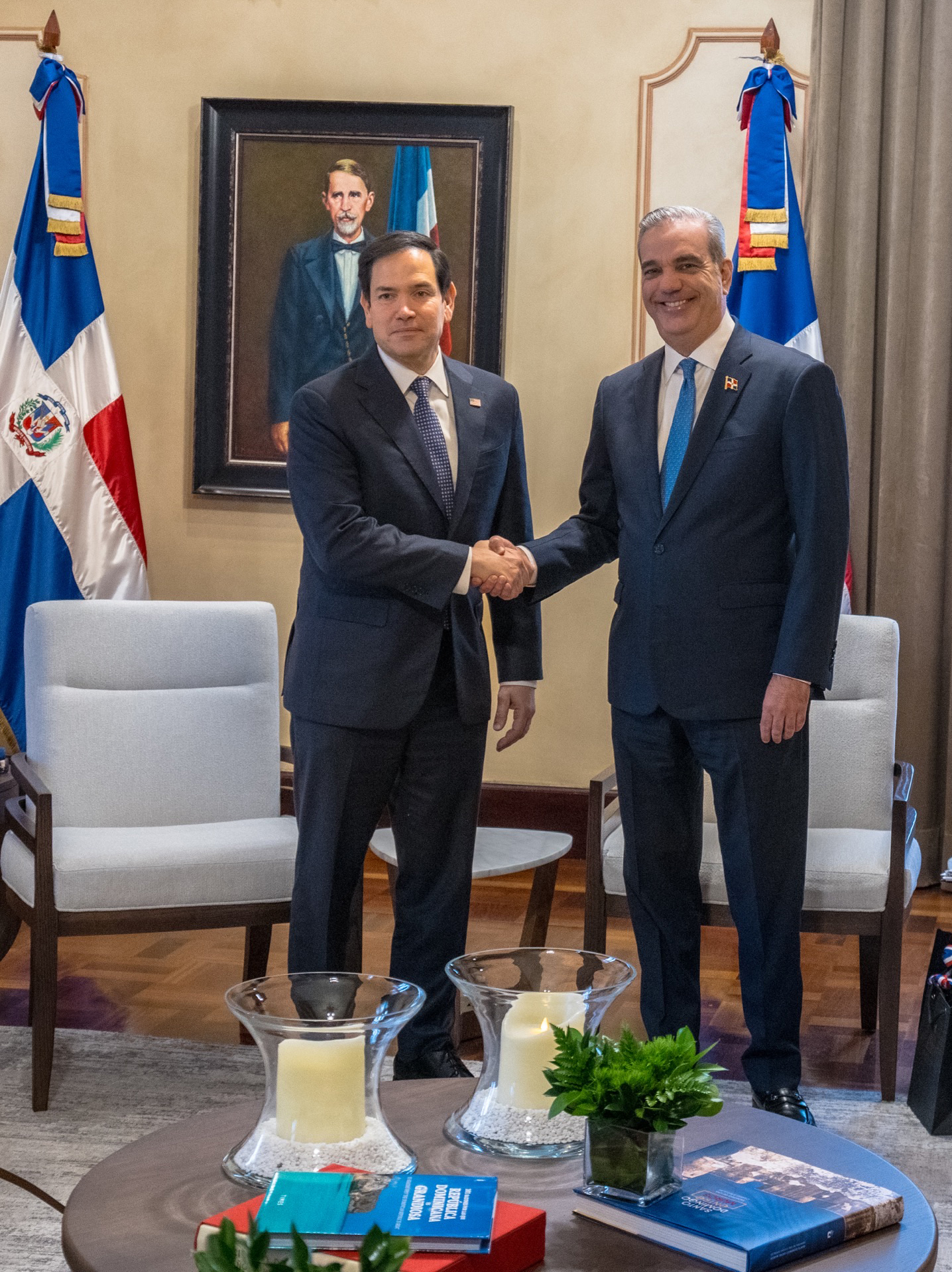
US Secretary of State Marco Rubio meeting with Dominican Republic president Luis Abinader in 2025

The country's standing as the largest Caribbean economy, second-largest country in terms of land mass, and third-largest in population, with large bilateral trade with (due to its proximity to) the United States and other smaller Caribbean nations make the Dominican Republic an important partner in hemispheric affairs. The Embassy estimates that 100,000 U.S. citizens live in the Dominican Republic, many of whom are dual nationals. An important element of the relationship between the two countries is the fact that more than 1 million individuals of Dominican origin reside in the United States; most of them live in the metropolitan Northeast, with some in Florida. In recent years, there has also been a large wave of migration from the Dominican Republic to neighboring Puerto Rico, a U.S. territory which has many cultural and historical ties to the Dominican Republic.

Under the purview of the Monroe Doctrine and American imperialism, US President Ulysses Grant unsuccessfully promoted a treaty to annex the Dominican Republic, which was up for debate in the US Congress from 1869 to 1871. The American idea to acquire Santo Domingo—dragged by political and economic instability since its separation from Haiti in 1844—traced back to 1854.

The U.S. occupied the Dominican Republic from 1916 until 1924 and intervened on behalf of the Dominican government during the 1965 Dominican Civil War. The USA was supportive of dictator Rafael Trujillo until 1960, and the CIA is suspected to have helped assassinate him in 1961.

The Dominican government has been supportive of many U.S. initiatives in the United Nations and related agencies. The two governments cooperate in the fight against the traffic in illegal substances. The Dominican Republic has worked closely with U.S. law enforcement officials on issues such as the extradition of fugitives and measures to hinder illegal migration.

The United States supported the Leonel Fernández administration's efforts to improve Dominican competitiveness, to attract foreign private investment, to fight corruption, and to modernize the tax system. Bilateral trade is important to both countries. U.S. firms, mostly manufacturers of apparel, footwear, and light electronics, as well as U.S. energy companies, account for much of the foreign private investment in the Dominican Republic.

Exports from the United States to the Dominican Republic in 2018 totaled US$8.9 billion, up 14% from the previous year. The Dominican Republic exported $5.3 billion to the United States in 2018. The U.S. Embassy works closely with U.S. business firms and Dominican trade groups, both of which can take advantage of the new opportunities in this growing market. At the same time, the Embassy is working with the Dominican government to resolve ongoing commercial and investment disputes.

The Embassy counsels U.S. firms through its Country Commercial Guide and informally via meetings with business persons planning to invest or already investing in the Dominican Republic. This is a challenging business environment for U.S. firms, especially for medium to smaller sized businesses.

The U.S. Agency for International Development (USAID) mission is focused on improving access of underserved populations to quality health care and combating HIV/AIDS and tuberculosis (TB), promoting economic growth through policy reform, support for CAFTA-DR implementation, and technical assistance to small producers and tourism groups; environmental protection and policy reform initiatives; improved access to quality primary, public education and assistance to at-risk youth; a model rural electrification program; and improving participation in democratic processes, while strengthening the judiciary and combating corruption across all sectors.

== Resident diplomatic missions ==
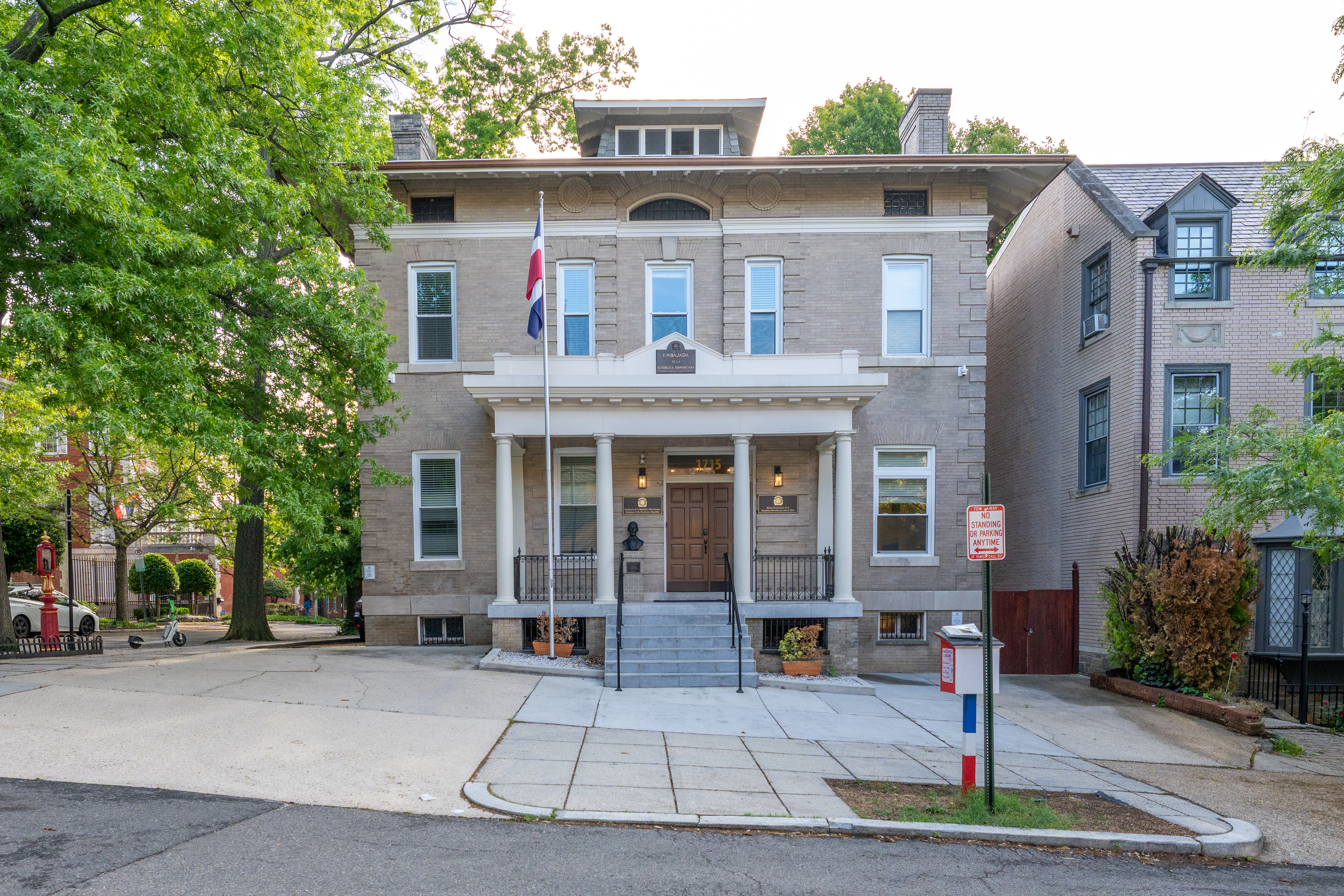
Embassy of the Dominican Republic in Washington D.C.

U.S. Embassy in Santo Domingo

- Dominican Republic has an embassy in Washington, D.C., and consulates-general in Boston, Chicago, Houston, Los Angeles, Mayagüez, Miami, New Orleans, New York City, Orlando, Paterson, Philadelphia, and in San Juan.
- United States has an embassy in Santo Domingo.

== See also ==
- Proposed United States annexation of Santo Domingo
- Dominican Americans
- Foreign relations of the United States
- Foreign relations of the Dominican Republic
- United States involvement in regime change in Latin America
