= Dominican Republic–Turkey relations =

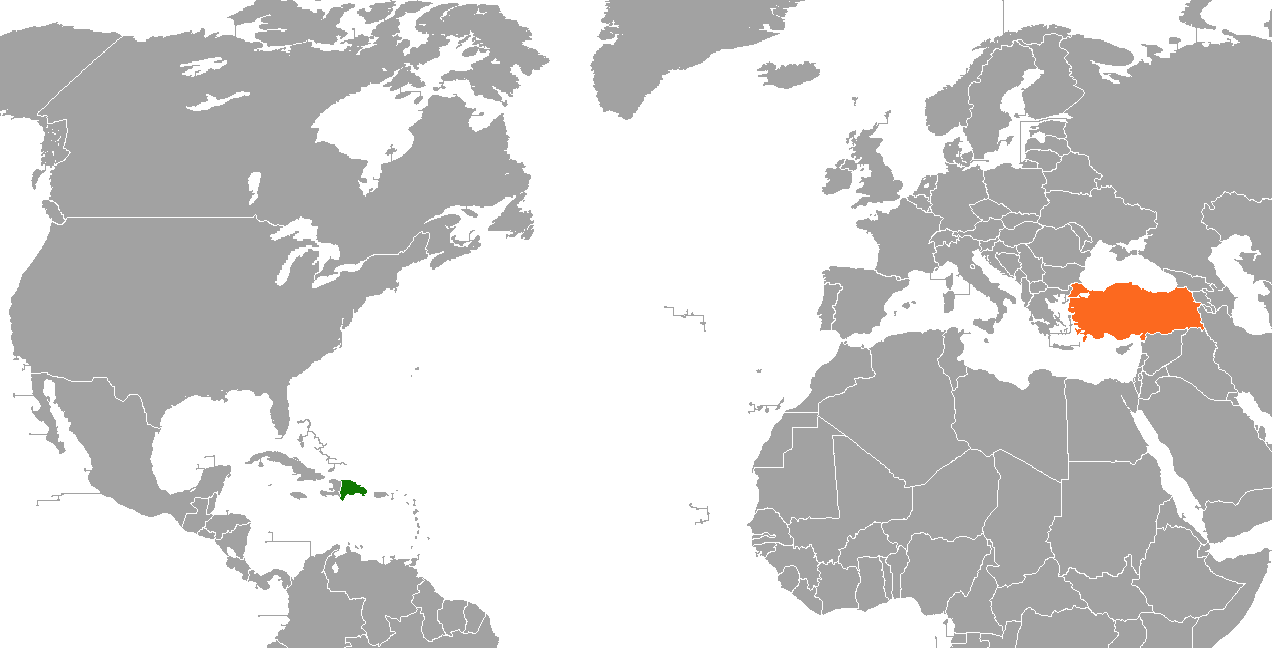
- Dominican Republic: Turkey

Diplomatic mission
- Dominican Embassy, Ankara: Turkish Embassy, Santo Domingo

Envoy
- Ambassador Elias Serulle: Ambassador Yeşim Kebapcıoğlu

Dominican Republic–Turkey relations are foreign relations between Dominican Republic and Turkey. Dominican Republic has an embassy in Ankara since August 31, 2019. Turkey has an embassy in Santo Domingo since October 1, 2013.

== History ==
Located in the strategically important and volatile Caribbean, having friendly foreign relations with the Dominican Republic has always been very important with various outside actors. In the nineteenth century, the principal outside actors were Spain, France, and Britain; toward the end of the century, Germany, Turkey and the United States also became influential in Dominican affairs.

When President of the Dominican Republic Fernández assumed office in August 1996, he made foreign policy and International relations an important priority, and has engaged Turkey by acting as a bridge between the Caribbean and Central America.

Since the 2010s, due to increased Turkish aid and the increasingly larger number of Turks who vacation in the country, the economic importance of Turkey has grown.

== Official visits ==
Guest	Host	Place of visit	Date of visit
(Turkey) Minister of Foreign Affairs Ahmet Davutoğlu	(Dominican Republic) Minister of Foreign Affairs Miguel Vargas	Palacio Nacional, Santo Domingo	2014
(Turkey) Minister of Foreign Affairs Mevlüt Çavuşoğlu	(Dominican Republic) Minister of Foreign Affairs Miguel Vargas	Palacio Nacional, Santo Domingo	February 1–2, 2017
(Dominican Republic) Minister of Foreign Affairs Miguel Vargas	(Turkey) Minister of Foreign Affairs Mevlüt Çavuşoğlu	Çankaya Köşkü, Ankara	April 19, 2017

== Economic relations ==
Trade volume between the two countries was US$132.7 million in 2019 (Turkish exports/imports: US$118.6/14.1 million).

== See also ==
- Foreign relations of the Dominican Republic
- Foreign relations of Turkey
