= List of ambassadors of Italy to the Dominican Republic =

Coordinates: 18.443173°N 69.967852°W

Ambassador of the Italian Republic in the Dominican Republic
- Ambasciatore della Repubblica Italiana presso la Repubblica Dominicana
- Emblem of Italy
- Incumbent; Sergio Maffettone since March 2026
- Style: Mr./Madam Ambassador (informal)
- Inaugural holder: Enrico Chicci
- Formation: February 27, 1898
- Website: ambsantodomingo.esteri.it/es

The Italian ambassador in Santo Domingo is the official representative of the Government in Rome to the Government of the Dominican Republic. He is concurrently accredited in St. John's, Antigua and Barbuda (Antigua and Barbuda), Basseterre (St. Kitts and Nevis), Port-au-Prince (Haiti), and Kingston (Jamaica).

== List of representatives ==
Diplomatic accreditation	Ambassador	Observations	List of prime ministers of Italy	List of presidents of the Dominican Republic	Term end
February 27, 1898	Enrico Chicci		Luigi Pelloux	Manuel María Gautier	
June 15, 1901	Giuseppe Saint-Martin	Chargé d'affaires	Giuseppe Zanardelli	Juan Isidro Jiménez	
August 2, 1902	Oreste Savina		Giuseppe Zanardelli	Horacio Vásquez	
December 8, 1907	Giacomo Mondello	with residence in Havana consul	Sidney Sonnino	Ramón Cáceres	
September 20, 1913	Annibale Raybaudi Massiglia	Conte Annibale Raybaudi Massiglia with residence in Havana	Giovanni Giolitti	José Bordas Valdez	
September 10, 1915	Stefano Carrara	with residence in Havana, appointed in the autumn of 1915. He is also accredited to Hayti and Santo Domingo. Until his appointment here he was Italian Consul General at Malta, and has seen service at the Italian Legation in Buenos Aires	Antonio Salandra	Juan Isidro Jiménez	
March 27, 1924	Guglielmo Vivaldi	In 1934 he was envoy to Caracas,	Benito Mussolini	Horacio Vásquez	
May 29, 1930	Raffaele Boscarelli	residence in Havana	Benito Mussolini	Rafael Estrella Ureña	
September 19, 1933	Nicola Macario	residence in Havana	Benito Mussolini	Rafael Trujillo	
August 6, 1937	Mario Porta	with residence in Puerto Principe (Parsley massacre)	Benito Mussolini	Rafael Trujillo	
May 14, 1947	Gastone Rossi Lunghi		Ferruccio Parri	Rafael Trujillo	
August 11, 1952	Antonio Cottafavi	ambasciatore italiano a Ciudad Trujillo, Grandfather of Vittorio Cottafavi father of Francesco, Maj. General, & Agnese Savio. Ancest.: Antonio Cottafavi (grand- father), Politician, Minister in 2 Giolitti Cabinets. married to Manuela Gianni de Araujo	Ferruccio Parri	Héctor Trujillo	
June 22, 1952	Alberto Barbarich	1940: Primer Secretario en Buenos Aires, Conde Alberto Barbarich married to Condesa Elena Barbarich. Domicilio: Arenales 1556.	Ferruccio Parri	Héctor Trujillo	
November 8, 1958	Pietro Solari		Amintore Fanfani	Héctor Trujillo	
September 12, 1961	Guelfo Zamboni		Fernando Tambroni	Joaquín Balaguer	
May 23, 1964	Roberto Venturini (Italian diplomat)	In 1972 he was Italian Ambassador to Albania	Giovanni Leone	Donald Reid Cabral	
June 12, 1966	Tristano Gabrici		Giovanni Leone	Joaquín Balaguer	
November 23, 1969	Virgilio Gorga	(*April 14, 1862 )	Giovanni Leone	Joaquín Balaguer	
March 26, 1974	Angelo Macchia		Aldo Moro	Joaquín Balaguer	
January 18, 1977	Giuseppe Lo Faro		Giulio Andreotti	Joaquín Balaguer	
January 31, 1980	Vittorio Pennarola		Francesco Cossiga	Antonio Guzmán Fernández	
December 10, 1984	Antonio Venturella		Bettino Craxi	Salvador Jorge Blanco	
January 19, 1989	Roberto Rossellini		Giulio Andreotti	Salvador Jorge Blanco	
June 24, 1993	Tommaso De Vergottini	In 1974 he became Chargé d'affaires of the Italian ambassador to Chile; In 1996 he was Italian ambassador to Ugruguay.	Carlo Azeglio Ciampi	Salvador Jorge Blanco	
January 7, 1996	Ruggero Vozzi	1989: Ruggero Vozzi, First Counsellor of the Italian Embassy in The Hague	Romano Prodi	Leonel Fernández	
October 1, 1999	Stefano Alberto Canavesio		Massimo D’Alema	Leonel Fernández	
March 1, 2003	Giorgio Sfara		Silvio Berlusconi	Hipólito Mejía	
July 4, 2006	Enrico Guicciardi		Romano Prodi	Leonel Fernández	
December 6, 2010	Arturo Olivieri	(* in Naples on June 14, 1949): In December 1972 he graduated in Laws at the University of Naples.; In August 1975 he entered the diplomatic career.; Served in Dar-Es-Salaam, Brussels, the Permanent Representation of Italy to NATO and *1984 Jakarta.; In February 1992 he became Consul General in Buenos Aires.; In 1996 he became First Counselor at the Italian Embassy in Paris.; Returning to Rome, he serves in the Directorate General for the Countries of Europe, and subsequently to the General Directorate for Development Cooperation.: In January 2001 he was appointed Minister Plenipotentiary.; From June 16, 2003 to November 11, 2007 he was Italian ambassador to Tunesia.	Silvio Berlusconi	Leonel Fernández	
October 27, 2017	Andrea Canepari		Paolo Gentiloni	Danilo Medina	
