= Dominican Republic–Switzerland relations =

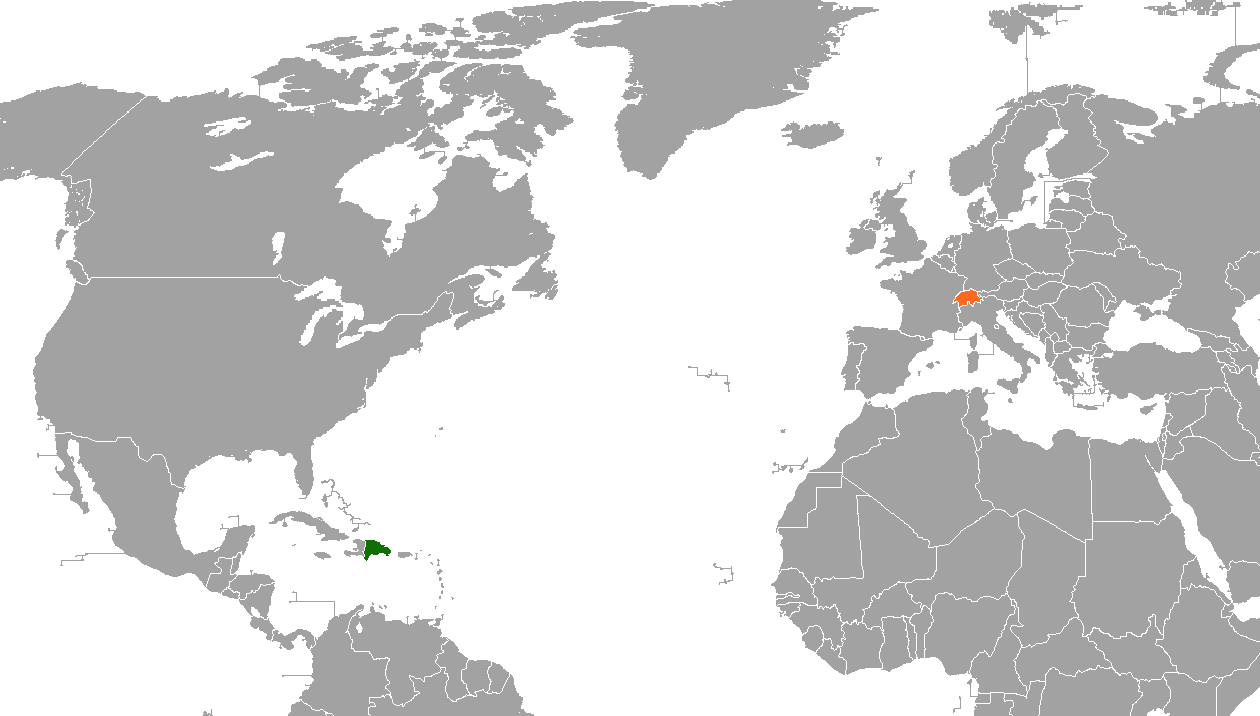
- Dominican Republic: Switzerland

Dominican Republic–Switzerland relations are the bilateral relations between The Dominican Republic and Switzerland. Dominican Republic has an embassy in Bern and a consulate-general in Zürich and Switzerland has an embassy in Santo Domingo.

== History ==
In 1936, Switzerland formally recognized the Dominican Republic and opened a consulate in Santo Domingo. During World War 2, Switzerland represented the Dominican Republic's interests to several countries in Europe. In 1957, the consulate upgraded to a Consulate General and in 2007, the Consulate General was uploaded to an Embassy. The Swiss Embassy is also responsible for consular affairs with Haiti, Dominica, St Kitts and Nevis and Antigua and Barbuda.

== Tourism ==
Switzerland sends large numbers of tourists to Dominican Republic every year. There are direct flights between both nations with Edelweiss Air.

== Trade ==
Switzerland is the Dominican Republic's second largest export partner. The Dominican Republic exported $US 771 million worth of goods to Switzerland in 2019. Gold accounted for 96% of all exports to Switzerland. Switzerland, in the same year, exported $US 39.8 million to the Dominican Republic, with the most common exports being Computers and Metal Watches.

== Immigration ==
2,077 Swiss citizens live in the Dominican Republic, making it the largest community of Swiss in the Caribbean. As of 2017, there were 11,454 Dominican citizens living in Switzerland.

== See also ==
- Foreign relations of the Dominican Republic
- Foreign relations of Switzerland
