= Dominican diaspora =

People of Dominican Republic descent

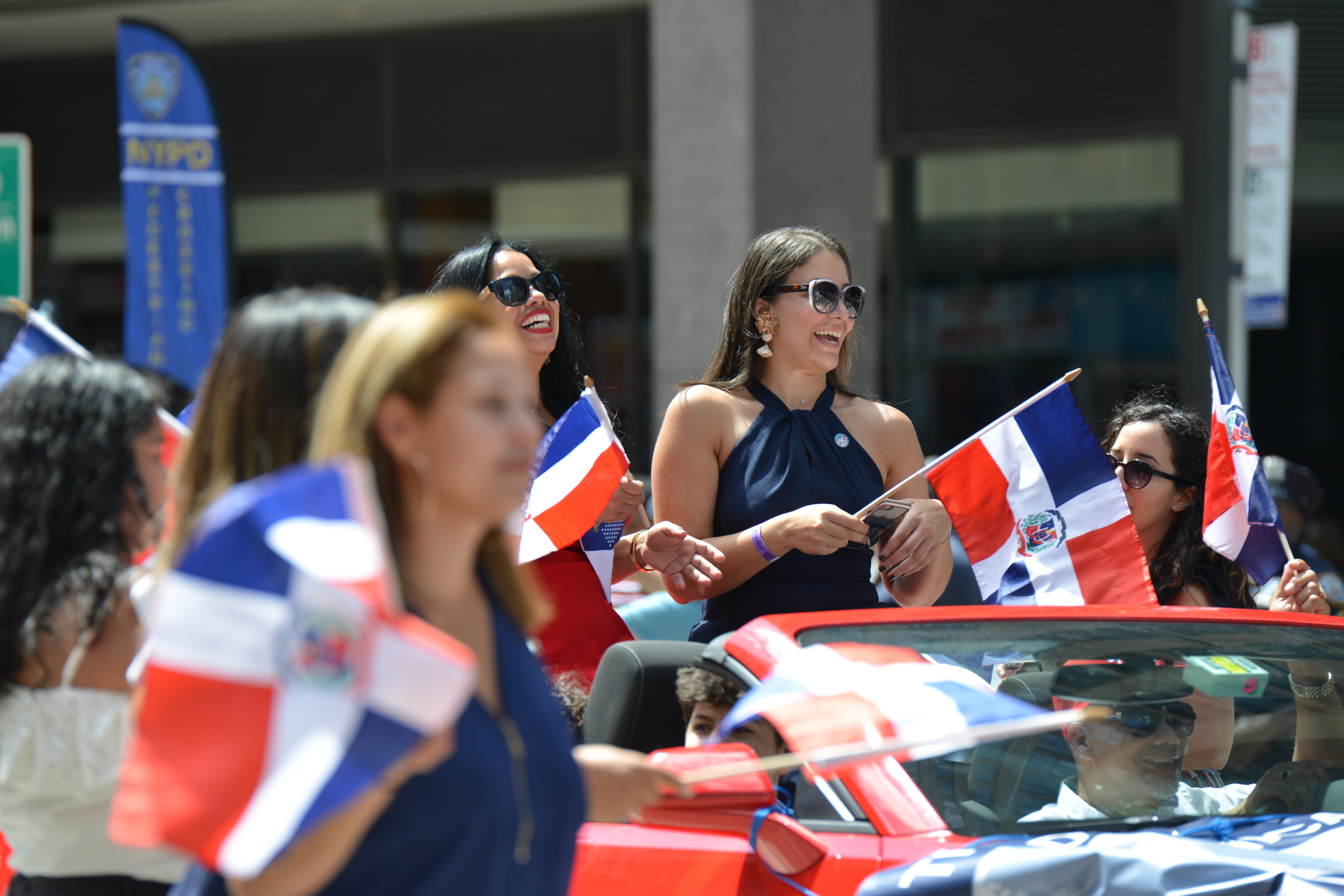
Dominican Republic people in Dominican Day parade of New York. Dominicans celebrate culture in 2019.

Flag of the Dominican Republic.

The Dominican diaspora consists of Dominican people and their descendants living outside of the Dominican Republic. Countries with significant numbers of Dominicans include the United States and Spain. These two nations have had historical ties to the Dominican Republic and thus it is the primary destination for many migrants. Many Dominicans migrate to the United States via Puerto Rico in rafts.

There are roughly 2.5 million people of Dominican ancestry living outside the Dominican Republic, mainly due to economic issues, educational opportunities, and political stability.

Dominicans mostly started to migrate to the US and Spain after the assassination of Rafael Trujillo, the authoritarian dictator who ruled from 1930 to 1961.

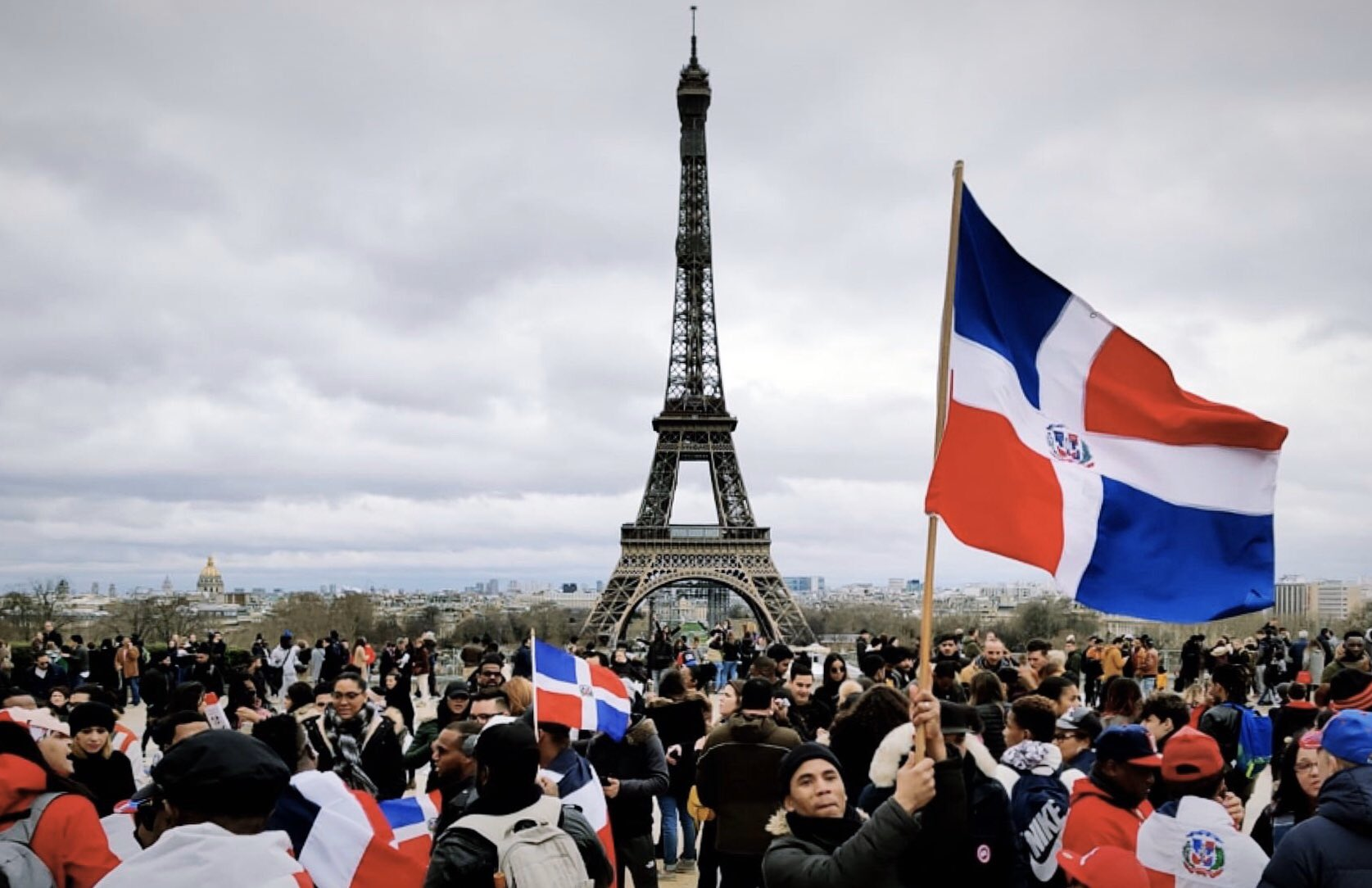
Dominicans protesting in Paris, France.

== History ==
The Dominican Republic originates from the Spanish colony of Santo Domingo, founded by Bartholomew Columbus, the brother of Christopher Columbus. The native peoples of Hispaniola, the Taino, an Arawak-speaking people, were completely wiped out due to diseases that the Spaniards brought from Europe. Nevertheless, today there are still some Dominicans with small amounts of Taino DNA, usually ranging around 10-15%.

== Ethnic groups ==
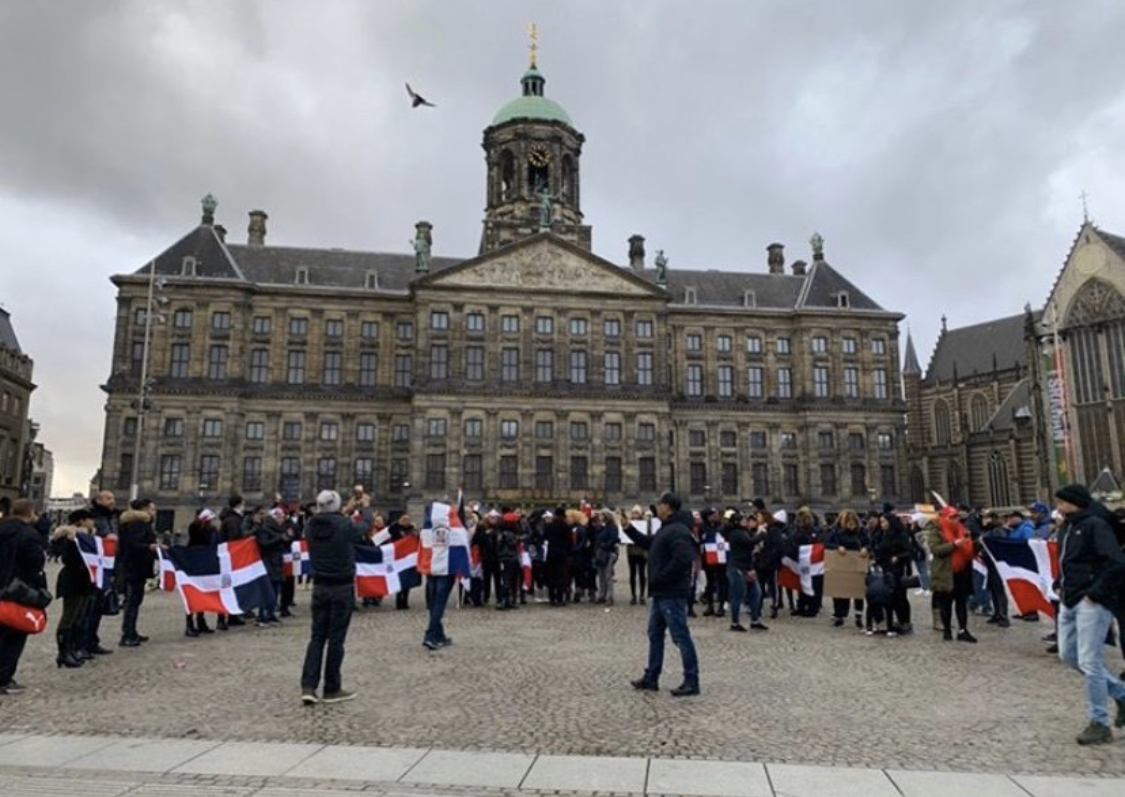
Dominicans in Amsterdam.

Dominicans are predominantly mixed with European (specifically Spanish), African, and indigenous Taino ancestry. Dominicans usually do not classify themselves as white or black like in the United States, but rather they identify as mixed, "Indio", or more broadly with their nation, culture, and language.

Many Dominicans of predominantly European descent have ancestry from the Canary Islands and Andalucía, and Extremadura due to the immigration of people from these areas of Spain to Latin America. Dominican Spanish is similar to the Spanish spoken in these regions.
