= Dominican Republic–India relations =

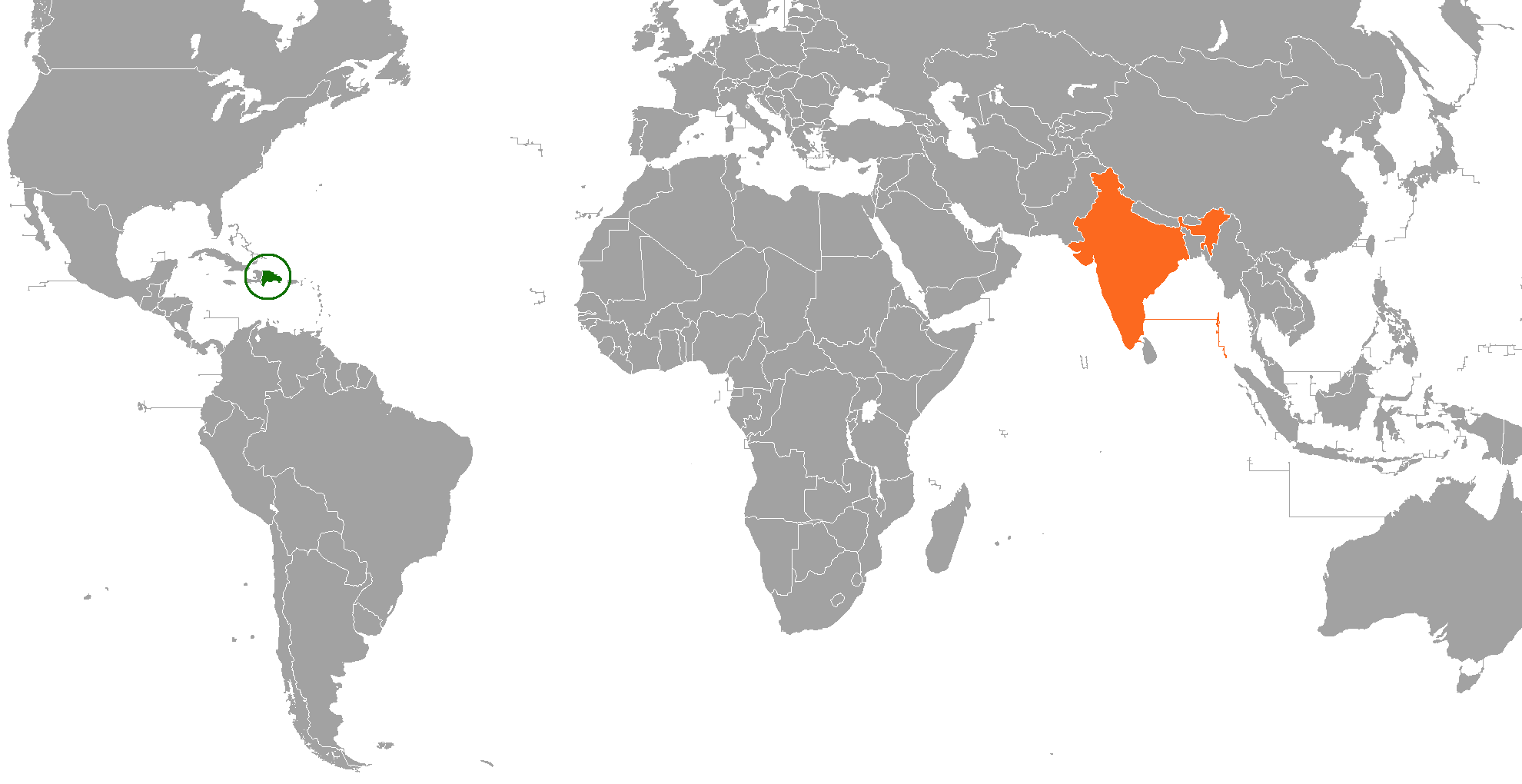
- Dominican Republic: India

Diplomatic mission
- Embassy of Dominican Republic, New Delhi: Embassy of India, Santo Domingo

Dominican Republic–India relations are the international relations that exist between the Dominican Republic and India. The Dominican Republic maintains an embassy in New Delhi. Since January 2022, India maintains an embassy in Santo Domingo.

== History ==
The Dominican Republic and India established diplomatic relations in May 1999. The countries signed a Memorandum of Understanding in Santo Domingo in May 2001 agreeing to hold regular Foreign Office consultations. During the visit of Indian Minister of State for External Affairs Rao Inderjit Singh visiting to the Dominican Republic in September 2004, the Dominican Republic Government announced that it would open an embassy in New Delhi. DR Foreign Minister Carlos Morales Troncoso, several other ministers, and business delegates visited Delhi, Agra, Bangalore, Hyderabad and Mumbai in February 2006. During the visit, the two countries signed an agreement on bilateral cooperation in Delhi on 17 February 2006. The Dominican Republic opened its embassy in New Delhi on 1 May 2006. The current Ambassador of Dominican Republic to India, Frank Hans Dannenberg Castellanos, also serves as the Dean of Diplomatic Corps.

DR President Leonel Fernandez visited India to attend the Delhi Sustainable Development Summit in February 2011. He also met with Prime Minister Manmohan Singh, the Foreign Minister, and several Indian businessmen. Fernandez addressed the Indian Council of World Affairs, and seminars organized by FICCI and CII in Mumbai, Bangalore and Delhi. From India, the highest level visits to the Dominican Republic have been at the level of minister of state. Ministers of State for External Affairs Anand Sharma, Shashi Tharoor, and General V.K. Singh visited the country in February 2007, January 2010, and February 2015 respectively. During Singh's visit, the two countries signed an MoU on co-operation in renewable energy.

The Dominican Republic and India were among the first 19 countries to join the International Solar Alliance, proposed by Prime Minister Narendra Modi, on 15 November 2016.

On 30 December 2020, the Union Cabinet of India approved the opening an embassy in Santo Domingo.

== Trade ==
Bilateral trade between the Dominican Republic and India totaled US$431.57 million in 2014-15. India exported $140.91 million worth of goods to the Dominican Republic, and imported $290.66 million. The main commodities exported by India to the Dominican Republic are cotton textiles and readymade garments, drugs and pharmaceuticals, furniture, transport equipment, manufactures of metals, chemicals, plastic and linoleum products, tea, processed foods and marine products. The major commodities imported by India from the Dominican Republic are tobacco, pearls, precious stones, semi-precious stones, jewels, and coins.

Indian IT firm signed an MoU with Cyber Park, Santo Domingo to establish IT training centre at the park. MANN India established a BPO at the Cyberpark, Santo Domingo. Bajaj retails two-wheelers in the Dominican Republic. Indian pharmaceutical firms Claris Life Sciences Ltd. and Micro-Labs have a representative offices in Santo Domingo. Claris had a revenue of over $1 million in the country in 2011. Caplin Point sources medicines in bulk from India and retails them in the Dominican Republic.

Brugal, the Dominican Republic's largest rum distiller, acquired distillery units from Praj Industries, Pune.

== Foreign aid ==
India donated $50,000 worth of life saving drugs to the Dominican Republic in March 2006. At the request of the DR Government, India donated medicines to provide relief in the aftermath of Tropical Storm Noel in October–November 2007.

India and the Dominican Republic signed an MoU to establish an IT Centre of excellence with Indian assistance in January 2010. The Centre was inaugurated by the DR President in August 2011. The Centre was operated by CDAC India with three Indian faculty members for the initial two-year period, before it was handed over to Dominican authorities.

Since 1999, citizens of the Dominican Republic are eligible for scholarships under the Indian Technical and Economic Cooperation Programme. They are also eligible for Indian Council for Cultural Relations scholarships. Several DR diplomats have also attended the PCFD programme run by the Foreign Service Institute.

== Embassy of India, Santo Domingo ==
The Embassy of India in Santo Domingo is the diplomatic mission of the Republic of India to the Dominican Republic. It was officially opened on 1 January 2022. It is currently functioning from Homewood Suites by Hilton.

=== History ===
The Dominican Republic has been under the jurisdiction of Embassy of India in Havana.

Plan to set up a new resident embassy in Santo Domingo was announced on December 30, 2020.

=== Ambassador ===
Abbagani Ramu is the current Indian Ambassador to the Dominican Republic.

== Cultural relations ==
The Dominican Republic and India signed a bilateral agreement on cultural co-operation in August 2012. Indian food festivals were held in Santo Domingo in October 2013, and in March and October 2014. DR Television broadcast an Indian film festival during April 2014.

As of January 2016, about 50 Indian citizens and people of Indian origin reside in the Dominican Republic. They are employed as businessmen, engineers, and software experts. There are also students at medical colleges and representatives of Indian companies.
