= Andrea Canepari =

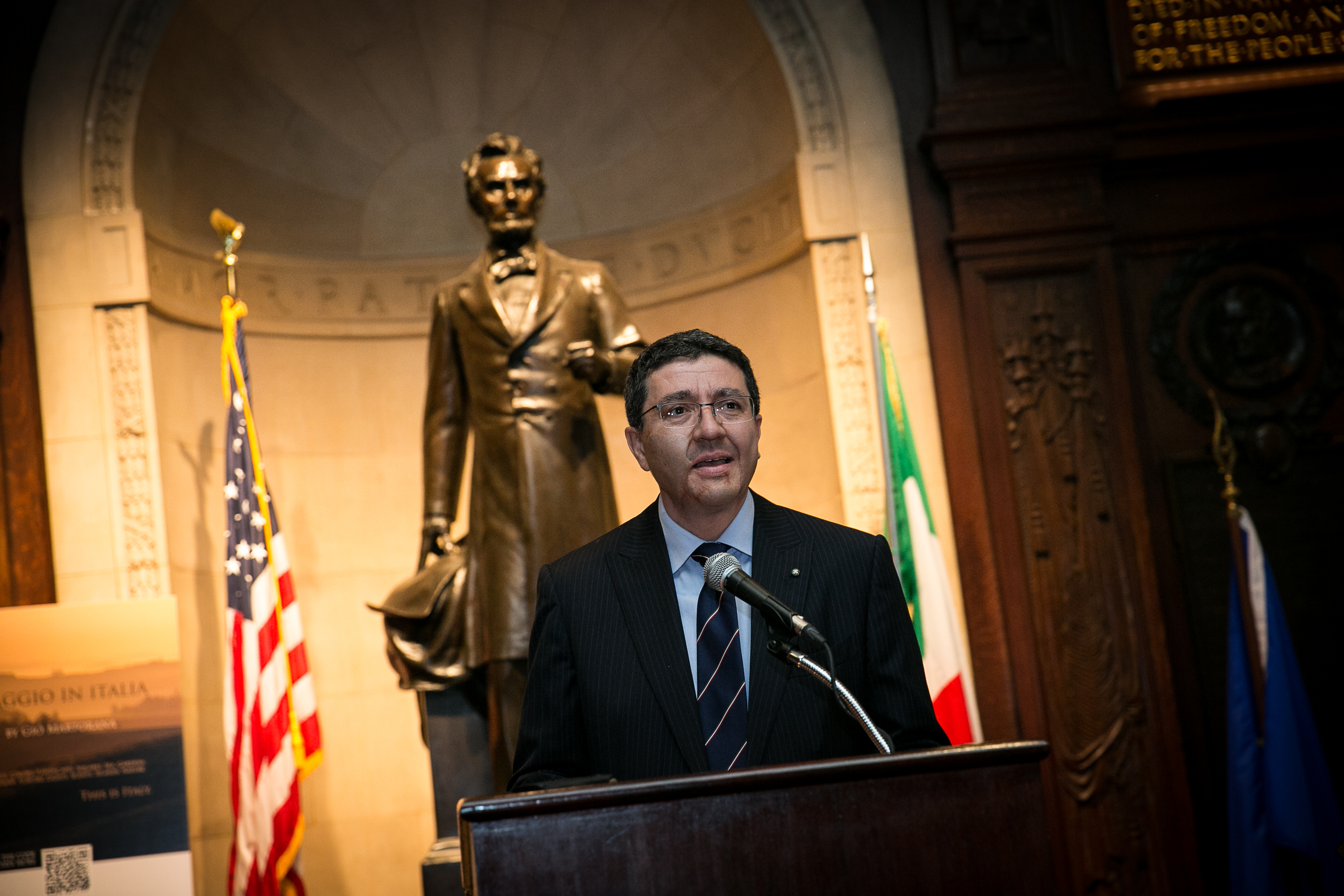

Personal details
- Born: 7 June 1972 (age 54) Pavia
- Education: Economics at Bocconi University, University of Pennsylvania Law School, and University of Parma

Andrea Canepari is Professor of Practice at Penn State School of International Affairs where he teaches Public Diplomacy and International relations. He also teaches Comparative Law at Penn State Dickinson Law. He is Senior Affiliate for the Partnership for Innovation, Cross-Sector Collaboration, Leadership, and Organization (PICCLO) at University of Pennsylvania. Among his several responsibilities as Italian Diplomat, he served as Ambassador in the Dominican Republic and Consul General in Philadelphia.

His research interests include public and cultural diplomacy with a focus on diaspora, subnational and cultural diplomacy.

A graduate from University of Pennsylvania Law School, Bocconi University and University of Parma, he was awarded in 2022 the Honorary Doctorate of Humane Letters by The American University of Rome (AUR) for his distinguished diplomatic career and dedication to promoting the Italian culture across the Atlantic.

== Early life and education ==
Canepari holds a BA and Master in Economics from Bocconi University (Milan, Italy) and a Law degree from University of Parma. He also holds a Master of Laws (LL.M) from the University of Pennsylvania Law School which he attended after being awarded a full scholarship from the “Gianani Foundation” (each year awarded to one scholar for academic excellence by A.B.I., Italian Banking Association).

== Diplomatic career ==
He entered the diplomatic career in 1999. From 2002 to 2006, he was the Chief of the Economic and Commercial Office at the Embassy of Italy in Ankara. From 2006 to 2010, he was the First Secretary of Political Affairs and Relations with the United States Congress at the Embassy of Italy in Washington, D.C.In 2010 he was Diplomatic Adviser of the Under Secretary of State for the Presidency of the Council of Ministers and from 2011 to 2013 he was Deputy for the North American Unit at the Ministry of Foreign Affairs.

=== Consul general in Philadelphia ===
From 2013 to 2017, he was the consul general of Italy in Philadelphia, Pennsylvania, with consular jurisdiction for the States of Pennsylvania, Delaware, Maryland, New Jersey (southern counties), North Carolina, Virginia and West Virginia. In the last years he has received numerous awards and over 200 mentions in the press, radio and television. He received the 2016 biennial “Global Philadelphia Award” from Temple University, for his achievements in enhancing international relations for the city of Philadelphia. Among others, he was part of the Papal Event Committee for the Pope’s visit to Philadelphia in 2015. He was also a member of the Presidential Advisory Board of Jefferson University, where he facilitated the creation of the first medical degree recognized in both Italy and the United States. He was member of the International Advisory Board of Scuola Universitaria Superiore IUSS of Pavia, Italy.

=== Ambassador to Dominican Republic ===
From 2017 to 2021 Andrea Canepari was Ambassador of Italy in the Dominican Republic, where he resumed political, cultural and economic relations. In 2017, he reopened the Embassy of Italy and inaugurated a new Diplomatic Chancery and a new Residence. Between 2018 and 2021, he promoted three cultural years with hundreds of events in conjunction with institutions, companies, universities and local cultural centers to celebrate and highlight the significant common history that Italy and the Dominican Republic share and to create new opportunities for future collaboration.

=== Current appointment ===
Andrea Canepari is currently serving at the Directorate General for Country Promotion of the Italian Ministry for Foreign Affairs in Rome. He is responsible for involving Italian legacy and Italians living abroad with Italy and the promotion of Made in Italy.

== Publications ==
He is editor of the book The Italian Legacy In the Dominican Republic, History, Architecture, Economy and Society by Saint Joseph's University Press (also published in an Italian and Spanish versions by Umberto Allemandi). With Dr Judith Goode (Professor Emerita and former President of the Society for the Anthropology of North America) he is co-editor of The Italian Legacy in Philadelphia: History, Culture, People, and Ideas by Temple University Press and of The Italian Legacy in Washington, D.C. Architecture, Design, Art and Culture by Skira.

- Canepari, Andrea/Goode, Judith (2023). “L’Eredità Italiana a Filadelfia: Storia, Cultura, Persone e Idee” Treccani
- Canepari, Andrea (2021). "Italianos en la Républica Dominicana. Historias y aventuras de viejos amigos" Umberto Allemandi
- Canepari, Andrea/ Goode, Judith (2021). "The Italian Legacy in Philadelphia: History, Culture, People, and Ideas" Temple University Press
- Canepari, Andrea (2021). "El legado italiano en República Dominicana: Historia, Arquitectura, Economía y Sociedad" Umberto Allemandi
- Canepari, Andrea (2021). "L'Eredità Italiana in Repubblica Dominicana. Storia, Architettura, Economia e Società" Umberto Allemandi
- Canepari, Andrea (2021). "The Italian Legacy in the Dominican Republic: History, Architecture, Economy and Society" Saint Joseph’s University Press
- Molinari, Luca/ Canepari, Andrea (2007) The Italian Legacy in Washington, D.C. Architecture, Design, Art and Culture
- Canepari, Andrea (1999). “Commento all’art. 142 del Testo Unico della Finanza” which is a comment on the then newly Italian law on proxy voting published by Giuffrè in 1999 in the book edited by Piergaetano Marchetti and Luigi Bianchi “La disciplina delle società quotate”.

== Honours ==
=== Decorations ===
- Italy - Knight of the Order of Merit of the Italian Republic on 27 December 2011;
- SMOM - Knight of Magisterial Grace, Order of Malta (Sovereign Military Hospitaller Order of Saint John of Jerusalem of Rhodes and Malta – SMOM);
- Dominican Republic - Orden al Mérito de Duarte, Sánchez y Mella en elGrado de Gran Cruz Placa de Plata (Grand Cross with Silver Star) of the Dominican Republic.

=== Awards ===
- Honorary Doctorate of Humane Letters by The American University of Rome (AUR) on 26 May 2022;
- Global Philadelphia Award of Temple University on 9 November 2016;
- EUFOR Libya CSDP Service Medal for Planning and Support, awarded by the European Union
