= Canada–Caribbean relations =

Diplomatic relations between Canada and Caribbean

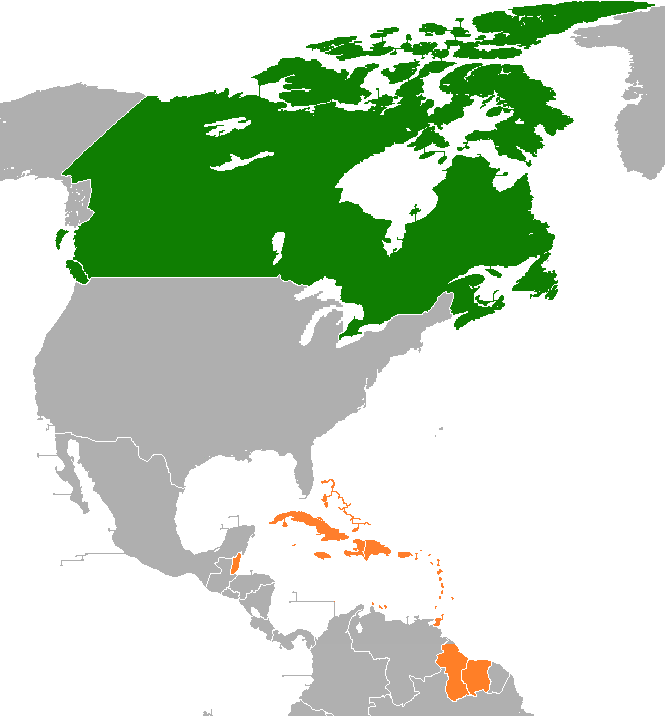
Map of Canada (in green) and Caribbean (in orange)

There are long-established relationships between Canada and the many states of the Caribbean or West Indies. These ties have been on-going throughout the history of both regions. Initially these relations were based on the policies of European colonial powers in the Americas. More recently, both Canada and most of the Caribbean islands have achieved self-government, putting their relations into a different phase. CARICOM diplomats have referred to Canada as a '"special friend" of the Caribbean at the regional and bilateral levels.' Ties exist in such plurality of organs such as: the Commonwealth of Nations, the Organisation internationale de la Francophonie, Organization of American States, ParlAmericas, the United Nations, and the World Trade Organization.

== History ==
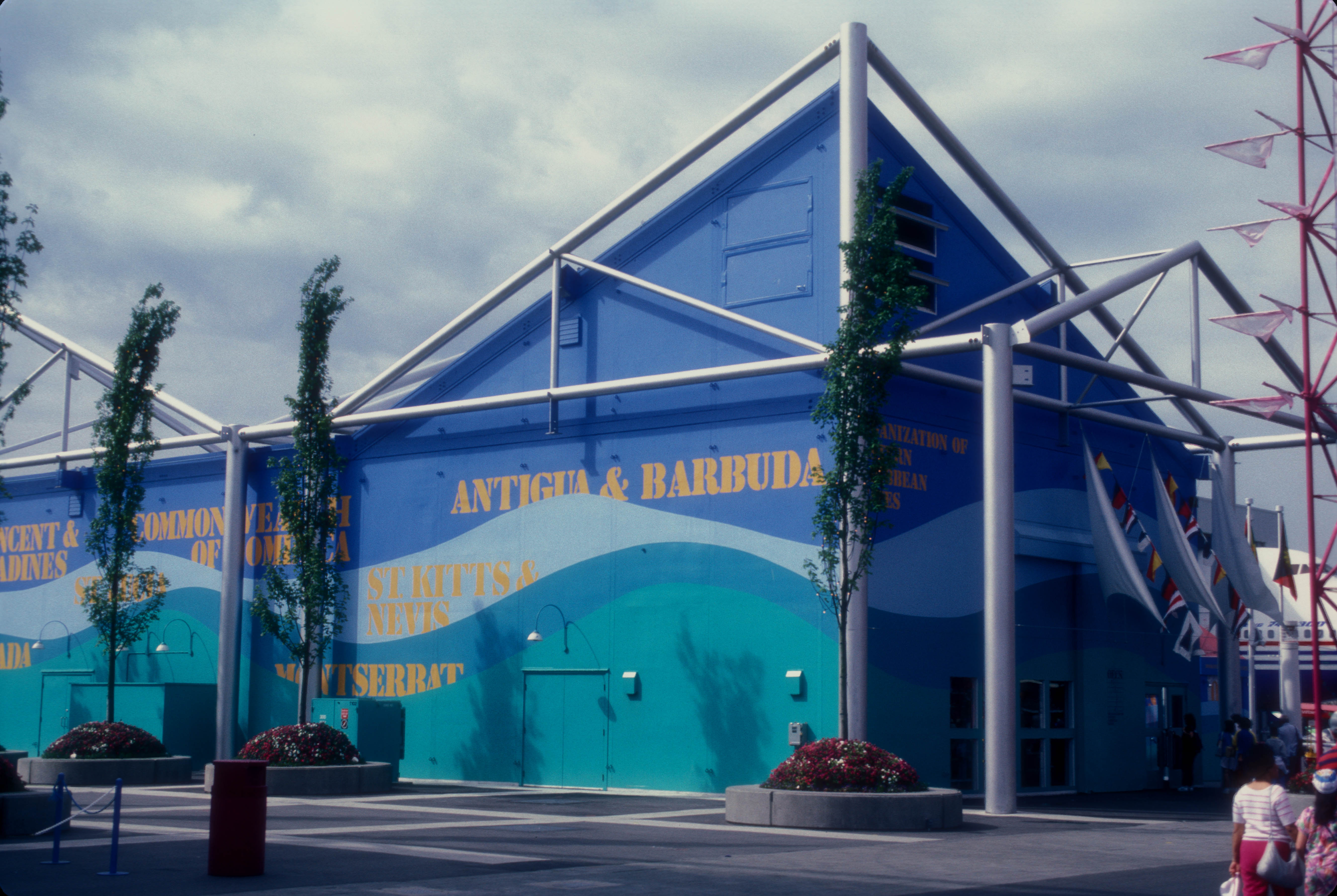
The former Expo 86 display booth for the Eastern Caribbean in Vancouver, B.C.

New France and the French colonies in the Caribbean enjoyed a flourishing trade in the first part of the eighteenth century, with the fortress of Louisbourg acting as an important trading centre linking New France, the Caribbean and France. When the United Kingdom gained control over the northern half of the continent, these relations were largely severed as trade between North America and the British Caribbean holdings went almost exclusively through U.S. ports, especially Boston.

With the American Revolution, the Americans were, in theory, to be shut out of the British colonies by the Navigation Acts and other British laws. Canadian merchants, especially those based in Halifax, Nova Scotia, strove to become the new leading trading partners. The trade with the Caribbean did become an important one for Halifax, but the British laws could do little to prevent American traders from continuing to play a central role. The merchants of the West Indies preferred dealing with the United States, which produced a greater variety of goods at lower prices than the Canadians. The weak Spanish Empire could do even less than the British to keep out foreign traders, and Canadian trade with Cuba and other Spanish holdings also rose in prominence. This trade peaked in the years immediately before Canadian Confederation. Canada shipped flour, corn, timber, and fish to the Caribbean, while sugar and rum moved north. In the Maritimes a prosperous sugar refining and rum industry arose based on these imports.

Also of historical importance was the military relationship between British colonies in the Caribbean and Canada. Halifax was the major North American British naval base, and British warships frequently travelled between it and the Caribbean. In both the First and Second World Wars Canadian troops were moved to the Caribbean to replace British forces that were needed in other theatres. Canadian troops in particular were stationed in Saint Lucia to protect against attacks by the German military during the first World War.

While the relationship with the United States and with the United Kingdom continued to be the most important ones to the British colonies of the West Indies, there were also growing concerns about American domination and Canada was seen as an important counterbalance. The United States imposed high import duties, and greatly favoured its domestic sugar industry over that of its southern neighbours.

== Proposals of political union ==
There were continued political and cultural links between Canada and the West Indies. This led to a number of Caribbean colonies engaging in movements to enter into Canadian Confederation.

=== Jamaica ===
In the political crisis that hit Jamaica in 1882, one of the proposed solutions was joining Canada. Michael Solomon led the pro-Confederation faction, but when he introduced a motion to that effect in the Legislative Council, everyone except for him voted against it.

=== Barbados ===
Prominent Barbadian R. P. Elliott wrote to the Canadian government on behalf of a number of the islands' elite asking to join Canada.

=== British West Indies ===
In the years after the First World War the British started to look at ways to consolidate the British Empire. For example, several British possessions in Oceania were transferred under the protection of Australia and New Zealand, and the British government of Lloyd George strongly considered transferring the responsibility for all British colonies in the Caribbean, as well as Newfoundland and the Falkland Islands, to the Canadian government, but most Canadians were not interested due to strong sentiments that Canada should retain the policy of not becoming a colonising force in the world.

This had some light support among Canada's business community, some of whom had just established businesses expanding into the West Indies region. Among them was Canadian businessman Thomas Bassett Macaulay, the son of the founder of Sun Life Assurance Company of Canada. T. B. Macaulay became very fond of working with the governments in the West Indies. He went on to become President of the group known as The Canadian-West Indian League which he co-found and was in existence until 1934. Additionally in the West Indies he acted as a representative for the Leeward Islands at the Canada-West Indies Trade Conference.

Canadian businessman Harry Crowe impressed upon Canadian Prime Minister Robert Borden to direct Sir Joseph Pope to issue a report titled Confidential Memorandum Upon the Subject of the Annexation of the West India Islands to the Dominion of Canada in which five major advantages were outlined for Canada to contemplate union with the West Indies territories.

- It would give to Canada an increase of territory amounting to 113,000 square miles (290,000 km^{2}), and of population 2,300,000 thus adding considerably to the importance and influence of the Dominion.
- The tropical products available in the new territory would make the Dominion more self-contained and would give us practically all the advantages of a diversity of climate and products which are afforded to that great Republic by the southern portion of the United States.
- The importance of sea power would become so obvious under new conditions as to leave little room for argument to the contrary.
- Confederation would afford a broader market to our manufacturers and producers which must result in a very large development of trade, as we produce precisely what they require, and vice versa.
- It would balance the accessions which will accrue to the other self-governing dominions at the termination of the war in the only way in which it is possible for Canada to obtain an equivalent, and thus to some extent compensate the Dominion for the sacrifices she has made in the defence of the Empire.

=== The Bahamas ===
After the defeat of the Jamaican measure, the government of The Bahamas presented a similar initiative in 1911. T.B. Macaulay encouraged members of the Legislative Council in the Bahamas to likewise consider pursuing political union with Canada, this political union proposal was ultimately rejected on the Canadian side for racial reasons.

=== West Indies Federation ===
During World War II trade between the Caribbean islands and the United Kingdom was mostly severed due to the sinking of many British merchant ships in the Atlantic. Canadian trade however continued to increase and Canada became the largest trading partner of the islands. Proposals were made at the end of the war for a free trade agreement to be concluded though this idea additionally never materialised.

During the 1950s several politicians involved in the West Indies Federation again broached an idea of political association with Canada. One proposal from the Caribbean heads was for the West Indies Federation to first become a fully functional unit and following five years time the bloc should look at obtaining dominion status with the United Kingdom and possibly move to seek political association with Canada at that time. The Canadian government presented the new government of the West Indies Federation with two merchant ships. The twin ships named The Federal Palm and The Federal Maple sailed to all ports between Jamaica in the north and Trinidad and Tobago in the south and were a key aspect of building trade links between the islands. Several meetings continued to take place in the Caribbean region and in Ottawa to formulate the structure and exact form of the future political association with Canada, but a constant occurrence in the Federation of haggling between the heads of governments stymied the movement. After 4 years, the entire West Indies Federation unraveled when Jamaica left, with the head of Jamaica publicly claiming that "one from ten leaves nought", with Jamaica representing the number "1" in the number ten, thus leaving a zero (representing the remaining islands). Trinidad and Tobago's leader quickly followed Jamaica's exit by saying if Jamaica represented the 1, then they were the 0 itself leaving "none", ending the Federation experiment. The remaining islands tried a group of the "Little 8" said it wanted to go its own direction and Barbados next withdrew from any idea of a smaller group. The remaining islands came up with the West Indies Associated States, but ultimately, they too reverted to their sovereign paths. The 1960s overall marked a decade of political independence by a large number of Caribbean nations from the United Kingdom.

=== Turks and Caicos Islands ===
During the 1970s and 1980s, the idea of political union was again briefly raised, with some discussion of the Turks and Caicos Islands joining Canada. It received some political dialogue in the governments of both nations however Canada became hesitant when it was revealed that the Turks and Caicos were due to hold a general election. A finding by a Canadian commission recommended that the government of Canada should disengage so as to not influence the free outcome of the Turks and Caicos elections. The commission maintained that if any locale wanted to open dialogue on political association with Canada it had to be totally of the resident populations own free will. The study however recommended that Canadians should consider increasing aid into the islands to support the Turks and Caicos inhabitants and to help increase their standard of living in the islands in the meanwhile.

This died down around 1987 but it was again revived on the Canadian side in 2003 when a television programme aired about Canada's past flirtation with political union proposals. In 2004 Peter Goldring, MP for Edmonton Centre-East proposed holding exploratory dialogues in the Caribbean islands to find out if there is still any interest for Canada to accord a political union. He lobbied in the Canadian House of Commons that should any nation in the Caribbean wish to proceed that this state should be elevated to the level of a Province rather than territory and in so doing the locale would become Canada's 11th Province.

In a 2009 e-mail correspondence with Mr. Goldring, he noted that "I... do not advocate the "annexation" of The Turks and Caicos Islands, as this term is one that is associated with colonialism", nor did he advocate a union with the islands unless there was "a clear and determined great majority of overwhelming will by both countries' citizens for such an association" and instead advocated an economic union, whether that is through a free-trade agreement or a customs union.

== Trade ==
In the later part of the nineteenth century the British system of imperial preference was largely dismantled and the Canadian traders lost their advantage in the Caribbean. The United States' economic and political power grew in the region, as they also removed many of the tariff barriers with the region. At the end of the century the United States gained political control over a number of Caribbean areas, such as the Danish Virgin Islands, Cuba, and Puerto Rico and American business relations had a near monopoly on trade in those areas. Trade patterns also shifted, as the market for West Indian sugar disappeared. By the Second World War bauxite had replaced sugar as the main export to Canada, and Jamaica and Guyana became the most important trading partners, while imports from the smaller islands declined considerably.

While trade between the regions declined, Canadian investment increased. As British companies pulled out of the region after decolonization, Canadian companies moved in. This was especially true in the banking and insurance sectors. Caribbean governments welcomed Canadian investment as a tool to prevent the total economic domination of the United States. This is perhaps most obvious in Cuba which pursued close economic ties with Canada after the Cuban Revolution.

== Cooperation ==
Canada and many countries of the Caribbean have a special relationship based on a long history of close commercial, investment, cultural and political ties as well as many shared common values and resemblance of institutions.

Canada was a founding member of the Caribbean Development Bank (CDB) in January 1970, and contributed $181.5 million during the first six cycles of the CDB's Special Development Fund. These contributions provided support for sustainable socio-economic development with an emphasis on reducing poverty and, more recently, strengthening democracies and regional economies.

Several agencies of the Canadian government have played a wide-ranging role of offering cooperation in many of the region's countries over the decades. Some of these agencies include the Canadian International Development Agency, the Department of Foreign Affairs and International Trade, the Atlantic Canada Opportunities Agency, the Canadian Trade Commissioner, the Transport Canada, the Canadian Radio-television and Telecommunications Commission and other agencies.

Canada has taken a lead role more recently in helping Haiti to return to a state of normalcy following the February, 2004 uprising. The Government of Canada has provided much of this assistance though the United Nations Stabilization Mission in Haiti MINUSTAH in addition to direct cooperation.

=== Aviation ===
Canadian assistance in Aviation services in the region have been carried out through the second half of the 20th century. During the late 1960s Canadian assistance through Transport Canada was sought to establish new venues for training Caribbean-based Air Traffic Controllers.

More recently the Vancouver Airport Services also manages many airports in and around the Caribbean region.

== Recent times ==
Presently, Canada's banks have an especially large role in the Caribbean commercial banking industry. Canadian banks own the three largest banks in the English-speaking Caribbean.

Additionally several Canadian energy companies have significant stakes in Caribbean-based providers of electricity.

- Emera
  - (The Bahamas) (Grand Bahama Power Company)
  - (Barbados Light and Power Company—BL&P) Formerly Canadian International Power Company Ltd. (CIPC)
  - (Dominica Electricity Services in Dominica)
  - (Saint Lucia) (St. Lucia Electricity Services Limited—LUCELEC)
- Fortis Inc.
  - (Belize Electricity Limited—BEL)
  - (Cayman Islands) (Caribbean Utilities Limited—CUC)
  - (Turks and Caicos Islands) (Fortis Turks and Caicos)

In 2006 several Canadian politicians moved to form the Canada-Caribbean Parliamentary Friendship Group.

In 2007, as part of a larger trip to Latin America and the Caribbean, Prime Minister Stephen Harper visited Barbados and Haiti. Observers said this was intended to increase Canada's visibility in the region and to remind Canadians of the region's importance.

The Canadian government announced in February 2009 that it was adding the Caribbean to its list of preferred recipients for foreign aid. This list includes 18 countries and the West Bank, as well as the Caribbean.

== Migration ==
Since the liberalization of Canada's immigration laws in the 1960s immigration from the Caribbean has increased dramatically. As of 2001, of Canada's 783,795-strong Black population (2.5% of Canadian population) nearly 40% have Jamaican heritage, and an additional 32% have heritage elsewhere in the Caribbean or Bermuda. In addition many Canadians of South Asian descent have immediate origins in the Caribbean.

The Canadian Seasonal Agricultural Workers Program (SAWP) consists of an annual recruitment of roughly 15,000 persons from the Caribbean and Mexico for temporary employment in Canada.

At the same time many Canadian snowbirds move to the Caribbean seasonally or for retirement.

== Canada's foreign relations with Caribbean countries ==
Sovereign states

- Antigua and Barbuda–Canada relations
- (The Bahamas) Bahamas–Canada relations
- Barbados–Canada relations
- Canada–Cuba relations
- Canada–Dominica relations
- Canada–Dominican Republic relations
- Canada–Grenada relations
- Canada–Haiti relations
- Canada–Jamaica relations
- Canada–Saint Kitts and Nevis relations
- Canada–Saint Lucia relations
- Canada–Saint Vincent and the Grenadines relations
- Canada–Trinidad and Tobago relations

Dependent territories

- Canada–France relations
  - Guadeloupe
  - Martinique
  - Saint Barthélemy
  - Saint Martin
- Canada–Netherlands relations
  - Aruba
  - Bonaire
  - Curaçao
  - Saba
  - Sint Eustatius
  - Sint Maarten
- Canada–United Kingdom relations
  - Anguilla
  - British Virgin Islands
  - Cayman Islands
  - Montserrat
  - Turks and Caicos Islands
- Canada–United States relations
  - Puerto Rico
  - United States Virgin Islands

== See also ==
- British Empire
- French colonial empire
- Regional Security System
- Seasonal Agricultural Workers Program
- Caribbean Development Bank
- Commonwealth of Nations
- Organization of American States
- La Francophonie
- Proposals for new Canadian provinces and territories
- High Commission of the Organisation of Eastern Caribbean States in Ottawa
- Canadian mining in Latin America and the Caribbean
