= List of Canadian state and official visits =

Map of state and official visits in this list

The following is a list of state and official visits made by Canada since the country's Confederation in 1867. These trips consist of either the monarch or a representative—the governor general, a lieutenant governor, or another member of the royal family—visiting a foreign country in an official capacity, either representing the Canadian people in a full state visit or simply in ceremonies related to Canada abroad. In some cases, such as royal weddings in the United Kingdom or D-Day commemoration ceremonies in France, the Canadian monarch and/or one or more other members of the Royal Family and the governor general will be present together.

== Visits ==
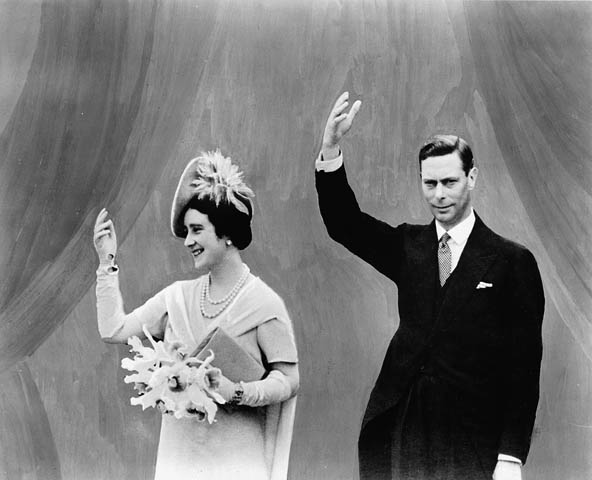
King George VI and Queen Elizabeth at the Canadian pavilion of the 1939 New York World's Fair

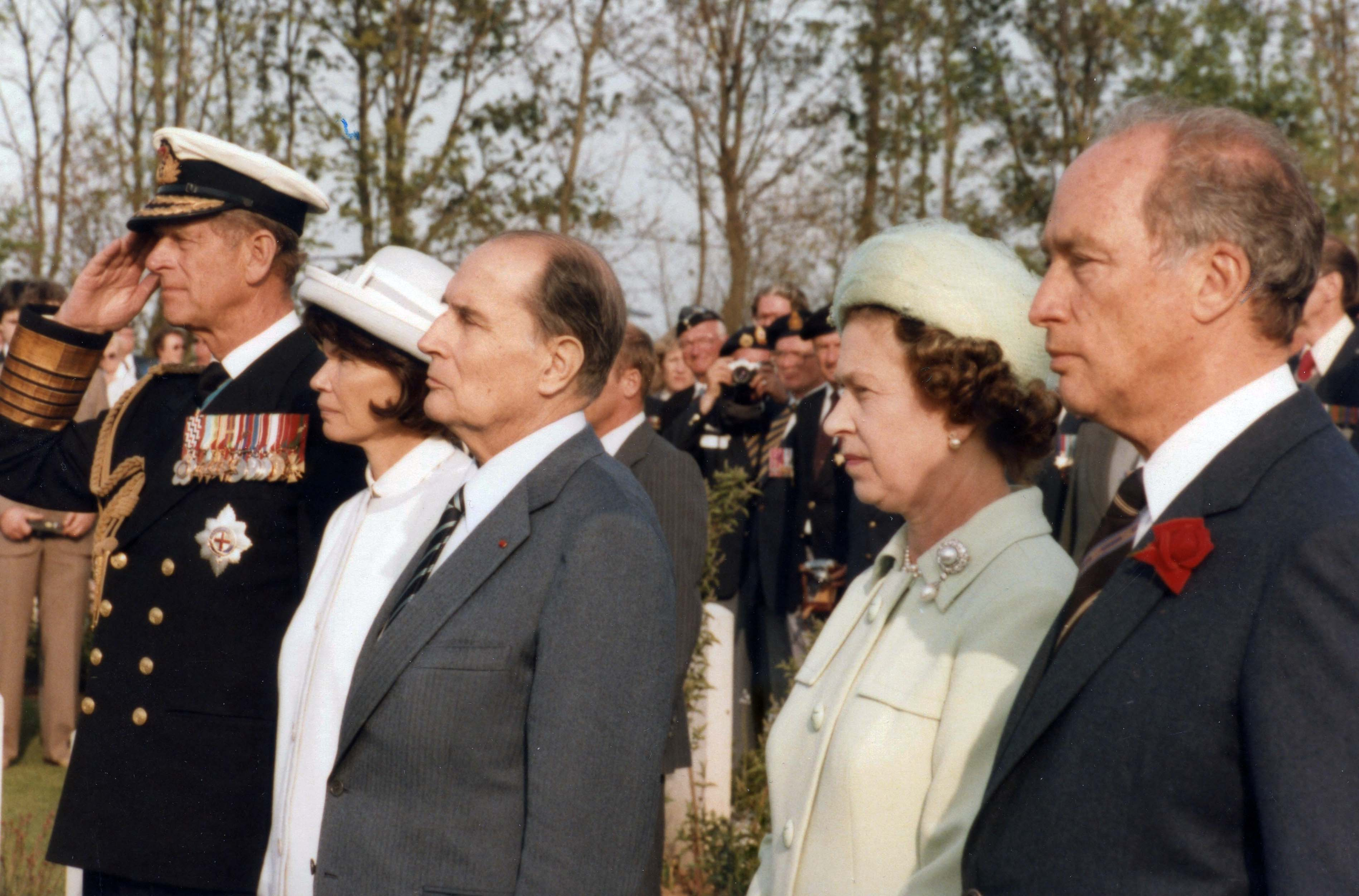
Elizabeth II, Pierre Trudeau, the Duke of Edinburgh, and François and Danielle Mitterrand at the Bény-sur-Mer Canadian War Cemetery, France, 1984

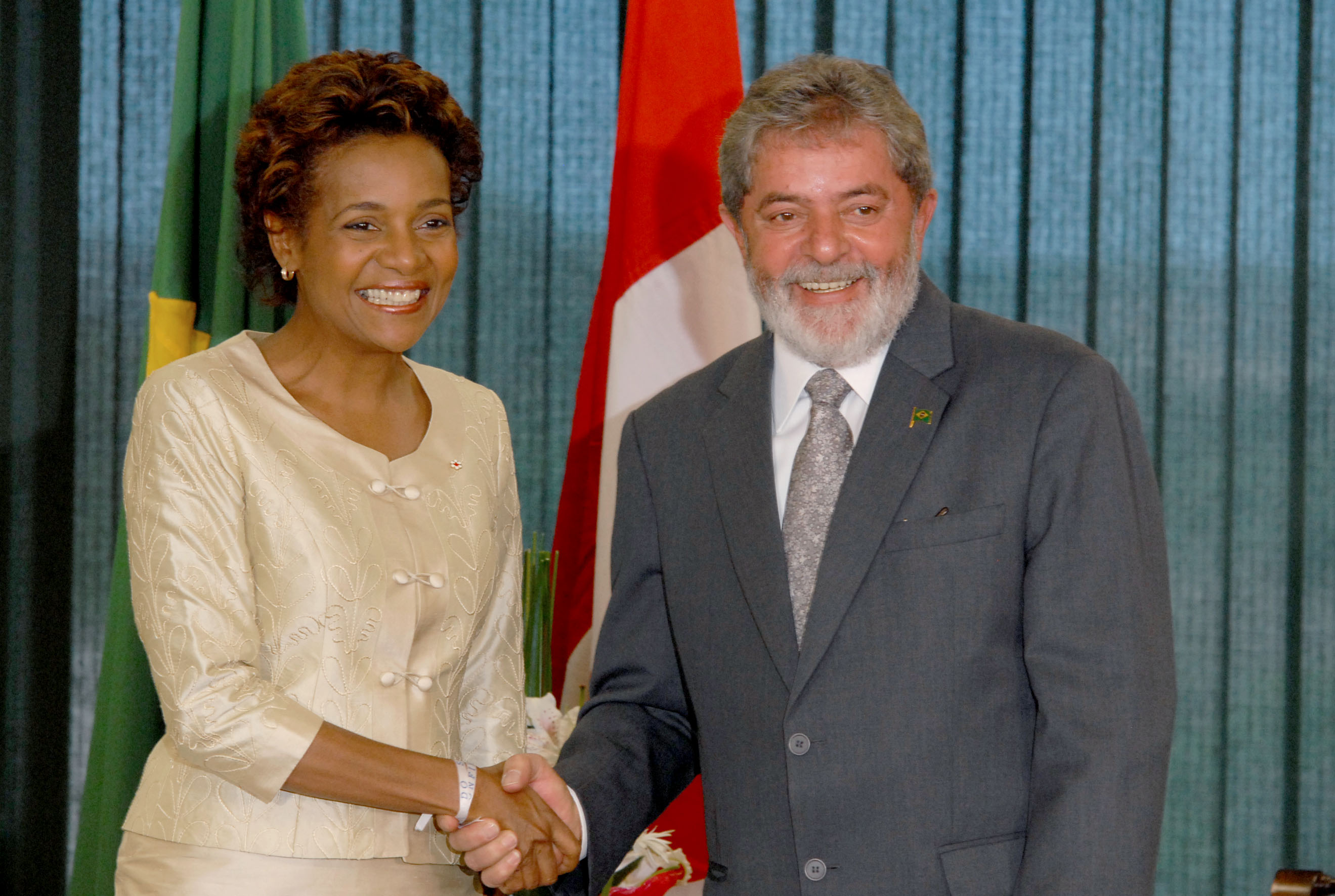
Governor General Michaëlle Jean with President of Brazil Luiz Inácio Lula da Silva, in Brasília, Brazil, 2007

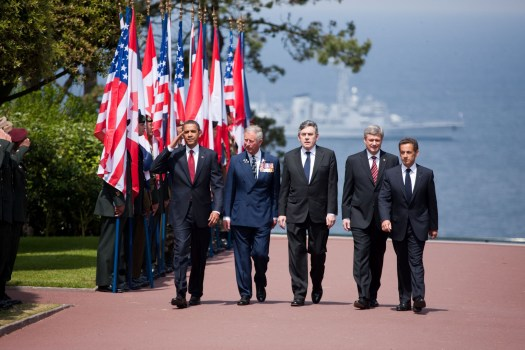
Prince Charles, Prince of Wales, at Colleville-sur-Mer, France, for the 65th anniversary of D-Day, 2009

=== 1860s ===
Visit to	Date	Representative	Received by	Type
United States of America		Governor General the Viscount Monck	President Andrew Johnson	Official

=== 1920s ===
Visit to	Date	Representative	Received by	Type
United States of America	1927	Governor General the Viscount Willingdon	President Calvin Coolidge	State

=== 1930s ===
Visit to	Date	Representative	Received by	Type
France	26 July 1936	King Edward VIII	President Albert Lebrun	Official
United States of America	1937	Governor General the Lord Tweedsmuir	President Franklin D. Roosevelt	State
United States of America	7–11 June 1939	King George VI	President Franklin D. Roosevelt	State
Belgium	1939	King George VI	King Leopold III	Official

=== 1940s ===
Visit to	Date	Representative	Received by	Type
United States of America	1947	Governor General the Viscount Alexander of Tunis	President Harry S. Truman	State
Brazil	June 1948	Governor General the Viscount Alexander of Tunis	President Eurico Gaspar Dutra	State

=== 1950s ===
Visit to	Date	Representative	Received by	Type
United States of America	1 November 1951	Princess Elizabeth, Duchess of Edinburgh	President Harry S. Truman	Official
United States of America	17 October 1957	Queen Elizabeth II	President Dwight David Eisenhower	State
United States of America	26 June 1959	Queen Elizabeth II	President Dwight D. Eisenhower	Official
United States of America	6 July 1959	Queen Elizabeth II	Governor William Stratton	State

=== 1970s ===
Visit to	Date	Representative	Received by	Type
Trinidad and Tobago	1971	Governor General Roland Michener	Governor-General Solomon Hochoy	Official
The Netherlands	April 1971	Governor General Roland Michener	Queen Juliana	State
Iran	October 1971	Governor General Roland Michener	Shah Mohammad Reza Pahlavi	Official

=== 1980s ===
Visit to	Date	Representative	Received by	Type
Norway	June 1981	Governor General Edward Schreyer	King Olav V	State
Sweden	June 1981	Governor General Edward Schreyer	King Carl XVI Gustaf	State
Denmark	June 1981	Governor General Edward Schreyer	Queen Margrethe II	State
Iceland	June 1981	Governor General Edward Schreyer	President Vigdís Finnbogadóttir	State
West Germany	1982	Governor General Edward Schreyer	President Karl Carstens	State
Italy		Governor General Jeanne Sauvé	President Francesco Cossiga	State
Vatican City		Governor General Jeanne Sauvé	Pope John Paul II	State
France	6 June 1984	Queen Elizabeth II	President François Mitterrand	Official
China	March 1987	Governor General Jeanne Sauvé	President Li Xiannian	State
Thailand	27 March-1 April 1987	Governor General Jeanne Sauvé	King Bhumibol Adulyadej	State
France		Governor General Jeanne Sauvé	President François Mitterrand	State
Uruguay	1989	Governor General Jeanne Sauvé	President Julio María Sanguinetti	State
Brazil	1989	Governor General Jeanne Sauvé	President José Sarney	State

=== 1990s ===
Visit to	Date	Representative	Received by	Type
Portugal		Governor General Ray Hnatyshyn		State
Ukraine		Governor General Ray Hnatyshyn	President Leonid Kuchma	State
Hungary		Governor General Ray Hnatyshyn		State
France	6 June 1994	Governor General Ray Hnatyshyn	President François Mitterrand	Official
China	April 1994	Governor General Ray Hnatyshyn		State
South Korea		Governor General Ray Hnatyshyn		State
Czech Republic	1996	Governor General Roméo LeBlanc	President Václav Havel	State
The Netherlands	1996	Governor General Roméo LeBlanc	Queen Beatrix	State
Austria		Governor General Roméo LeBlanc		
France	1996	Governor General Roméo LeBlanc	President Jacques Chirac	Official
France	1997	Governor General Roméo LeBlanc	President Jacques Chirac	Official
Guyana	1997	Governor General Roméo LeBlanc	President Sam Hinds	Official
Mexico	1998	Governor General Roméo LeBlanc	President Ernesto Zedillo	Official
Brazil	1998	Governor General Roméo LeBlanc	President Fernando Henrique Cardoso	Official
Argentina	1998	Governor General Roméo LeBlanc	President Carlos Menem	Official
Chile	1998	Governor General Roméo LeBlanc	President Eduardo Frei Ruiz-Tagle	Official
India	1998	Governor General Roméo LeBlanc	President K. R. Narayanan	State
Pakistan	1998	Governor General Roméo LeBlanc	President Muhammad Rafiq Tarar	State
United Arab Emirates	1998	Governor General Roméo LeBlanc	President Zayed bin Sultan Al Nahyan	Official
Côte d'Ivoire	1999	Governor General Roméo LeBlanc	President Henri Konan Bédié	State
Tanzania	1999	Governor General Roméo LeBlanc	President Benjamin Mkapa	State
Mali	1999	Governor General Roméo LeBlanc	President Alpha Oumar Konaré	State
Morocco	1999	Governor General Roméo LeBlanc	King Hassan II	State
Senegal	1999	Governor General Roméo LeBlanc	President Abdou Diouf	Official
Morocco	1999	Governor General Roméo LeBlanc	King Mohammed VI	Official

=== 2000s ===
Visit to	Date	Representative	Received by	Type
Argentina	May 2001	Governor General Adrienne Clarkson	President Fernando de la Rúa	State
Chile	May 2001	Governor General Adrienne Clarkson	President Ricardo Lagos Escobar	State
Germany	22–28 October 2001	Governor General Adrienne Clarkson	President Johannes Rau	State
Russia	September 2003	Governor General Adrienne Clarkson	President Vladimir Putin	State
Finland	2003	Governor General Adrienne Clarkson	President Tarja Halonen	State
Iceland	October 2003	Governor General Adrienne Clarkson	President Ólafur Ragnar Grímsson	State
France	6 June 2004	Queen Elizabeth II; Governor General Adrienne Clarkson; Prince Charles, Prince of Wales	President Jacques Chirac	Official
France	29–30 October 2005	Governor General Michaëlle Jean	President Jacques Chirac	Official
Italy	24–27 February 2006	Governor General Michaëlle Jean	President Carlo Azeglio Ciampi	Official
Vatican City	27 February 2006	Governor General Michaëlle Jean	Pope Benedict XVI	Official
Chile	11 March 2006	Governor General Michaëlle Jean	President Michelle Bachelet	Official
Algeria	19–22 November 2006	Governor General Michaëlle Jean	President Abdelaziz Bouteflika	State
Mali	22–27 November 2006	Governor General Michaëlle Jean	President Amadou Toumani Touré	State
Ghana	27 November-4 December 2006	Governor General Michaëlle Jean	President John Kufuor	State
South Africa	4–9 December 2006	Governor General Michaëlle Jean	President Thabo Mbeki	State
Morocco	9–11 December 2006	Governor General Michaëlle Jean	King Mohammed VI	Official
Afghanistan	8–10 March 2007	Governor General Michaëlle Jean	President Hamid Karzai	Official
France	9 April 2007	Queen Elizabeth II	Prime Minister Dominique de Villepin	Official
Belgium	14 April 2007	Prince Edward, Earl of Wessex	King Albert II	Official
Belgium	12 July 2007	Queen Elizabeth II	King Albert II	Official
Brazil	6–15 July 2007	Governor General Michaëlle Jean	President Luiz Inácio Lula da Silva	State
Argentina	8–12 December 2007	Governor General Michaëlle Jean	President Cristina Fernández de Kirchner	Official
France	6–12 May 2008	Governor General Michaëlle Jean	President Nicolas Sarkozy	Official
Afghanistan	7–8 June 2008	Prince Andrew, Duke of York	President Hamid Karzai	Official
China	August 2008	Lieutenant Governor David Onley	President and CCP General Secretary Hu Jintao	Official
Hungary	24–26 November 2008	Governor General Michaëlle Jean	President László Sólyom	State
Slovakia	26–29 November 2008	Governor General Michaëlle Jean	President Ivan Gašparovič	State
Czech Republic	29 November-4 December 2008	Governor General Michaëlle Jean	President Václav Klaus	State
Slovenia	3 December 2008	Governor General Michaëlle Jean	President Danilo Türk	State
Haiti	15–18 January 2009	Governor General Michaëlle Jean	President René Préval	Official
Liberia	7–8 March 2009	Governor General Michaëlle Jean	President Ellen Johnson Sirleaf	Official
Ukraine	23–26 April 2009	Governor General Michaëlle Jean	President Viktor Yushchenko	State
Norway	28–30 April 2009	Governor General Michaëlle Jean	King Harald V	State
France	6 June 2009	Prince Charles, Prince of Wales	President Nicolas Sarkozy	Official
Afghanistan	8–9 September 2009	Governor General Michaëlle Jean	President Hamid Karzai	Official
Slovenia	21–22 October 2009	Governor General Michaëlle Jean	President Danilo Türk	State
Croatia	23–27 October 2009	Governor General Michaëlle Jean	President Stjepan Mesić	State
Greece	29–31 October 2009	Governor General Michaëlle Jean	President Karolos Papoulias	State
Mexico	6–9 December 2009	Governor General Michaëlle Jean	President Felipe Calderón	State
Guatemala	9–12 December 2009	Governor General Michaëlle Jean	President Álvaro Colom	State
Costa Rica	12–15 December 2009	Governor General Michaëlle Jean	President Óscar Arias	State

=== 2010s ===
Visit to	Date	Representative	Received by	Type
Afghanistan	1 March 2010	Anne, Princess Royal	President Hamid Karzai	Official
Haiti	8–10 March 2010	Governor General Michaëlle Jean	President René Préval	Official
Dominican Republic	10 March 2010	Governor General Michaëlle Jean	President Leonel Fernández	Official
Afghanistan	24 March 2010	Prince Charles, Prince of Wales	Ambassador William Crosbie	Official
United Nations Headquarters	31 March 2010	Governor General Michaëlle Jean	Secretary-General Ban Ki-moon	Official
Senegal	14–18 April 2010	Governor General Michaëlle Jean	President Abdoulaye Wade	State
Congo	18–20 April 2010	Governor General Michaëlle Jean	President Joseph Kabila	State
Rwanda	20–23 April 2010	Governor General Michaëlle Jean	President Paul Kagame	State
Cape Verde	23–24 April 2010	Governor General Michaëlle Jean	President Pedro Pires	Official
China	30 June-5 July 2010	Governor General Michaëlle Jean	President and CCP General Secretary Hu Jintao	Official
United Nations Headquarters	6 July 2010	Queen Elizabeth II	Secretary-General Ban Ki-moon	Official
Mexico	13–14 September 2010	Governor General Michaëlle Jean	President Felipe Calderón	Official
Kuwait	25–27 February 2011	Governor General David Johnston	Emir Sabah IV	State
Qatar	27 February-1 March 2011	Governor General David Johnston	Emir Hamad bin Khalifa Al Thani	State
United Kingdom	28–29 April 2011	Governor General David Johnston	High Commissioner James R. Wright	Official
Malaysia	13–16 November 2011	Governor General David Johnston	King Mizan Zainal Abidin	State
Vietnam	16–19 November 2011	Governor General David Johnston	President Truong Tan Sang	State
Singapore	19–22 November 2011	Governor General David Johnston	President Tony Tan Keng Yam	State
Italy	22 December 2011	Governor General David Johnston		Official
Czech Republic	23 December 2011	Governor General David Johnston	President Václav Klaus	Official
Afghanistan	23–25 December 2011	Governor General David Johnston	President Hamid Karzai	Official
France	8 April 2012	Governor General David Johnston		Official
Belgium	8–10 April 2012	Governor General David Johnston	Minister of Defence Pieter De Crem	Official
Brazil	22–28 April 2012	Governor General David Johnston	President Dilma Rousseff	Official
Barbados	29–30 April 2012	Governor General David Johnston	High Commissioner Ruth Archibald	Working
Trinidad and Tobago	1–2 May 2012	Governor General David Johnston	President George Maxwell Richards	State
United Kingdom	3–6 June 2012	Governor General David Johnston	High Commissioner Gordon Campbell	Official
United States of America	19–22 July 2012	Governor General David Johnston	Rear-Admiral Ron Lloyd	Official
United Kingdom	25–30 July 2012	Governor General David Johnston	High Commissioner Gordon Campbell	Official
Mexico	30 November-2 December 2012	Governor General David Johnston	President Felipe Calderón/ President Enrique Peña Nieto	Working
Peru	2–5 December 2012	Governor General David Johnston	President Ollanta Humala	Official
Guatemala	5–7 December 2012	Governor General David Johnston	President Otto Pérez Molina	State
South Korea	24–26 February 2013	Governor General David Johnston	President Park Geun-hye	Official
Vatican City	18–19 March 2013	Governor General David Johnston	Pope Francis	Official
Netherlands	29–30 April 2013	Governor General David Johnston	King Willem-Alexander	Official
Ghana	13–16 May 2013	Governor General David Johnston	President John Dramani Mahama	State
Botswana	16–19 May 2013	Governor General David Johnston	President Ian Khama	State
South Africa	20–22 May 2013	Governor General David Johnston	President Jacob Zuma	State
United States of America	28–29 May 2013	Governor General David Johnston	Senator Stan Rosenberg	Official
China	16–24 October 2013	Governor General David Johnston	President and CCP General Secretary Xi Jinping	State
Mongolia	24–26 October 2013	Governor General David Johnston	President Tsakhiagiin Elbegdorj	State
India	22 February-1 March 2014	Governor General David Johnston	President Pranab Mukherjee	State
United States of America	28 April-2 May 2014	Governor General David Johnston	Consul General James Villeneuve	Official
Poland	22–26 October 2014	Governor General David Johnston	President Bronisław Komorowski	State
Netherlands	26–27 October 2014	Governor General David Johnston	King Willem-Alexander	Official
Belgium	27–29 October 2014	Governor General David Johnston	King Philippe	Official
Chile	29 November-3 December 2014	Governor General David Johnston	President Michelle Bachelet	State
Colombia	3–6 December 2014	Governor General David Johnston	President Juan Manuel Santos	State
Saudi Arabia	25–28 January 2015	Governor General David Johnston	Prince Abdulaziz bin Majid	Official
Singapore	28–29 March 2015	Governor General David Johnston	President Tony Tan	Official
United States of America	26–30 April 2015	Governor General David Johnston	Governor Mark Dayton; Governor Rick Snyder	Working
United States of America	26–30 April 2015	Governor General David Johnston	Governor Mark Dayton; Governor Rick Snyder	Working
France	1 July 2016	Prince Charles, Prince of Wales		Official
Jordan	October 29-November 1, 2016	Governor General David Johnston	King Abdullah II	State
Israel	1-4 November 2016	Governor General David Johnston	President Reuven Rivlin	State
Palestine	4-5 November 2016	Governor General David Johnston	President Mahmoud Abbas	State
Cuba	29 November 2016	Governor General David Johnston	President and First Secretary Raúl Castro	Official
Sweden	19-23 February 2017	Governor General David Johnston	King Carl XVI Gustaf	State
France	9 April 2017	Governor General David Johnston, Prince Charles, Prince William, Prince Harry	President Francois Hollande	Official
China	10–14 July 2017	Governor General David Johnston	President and CCP General Secretary Xi Jinping	Official
United Kingdom	17–19 July 2017	Governor General David Johnston	High Commissioner Janice Charette	Official
Thailand	26 October 2017	Governor General Julie Payette	King Vajiralongkorn	Official
Ukraine	17–18 January 2018	Governor General Julie Payette	President Petro Poroshenko	Official
Latvia	18-19 January 2018	Governor General Julie Payette	President Raimonds Vejonis	Official
South Korea	7–12 February 2018	Governor General Julie Payette	President Moon Jae-in	Official
United States	26-27 April 2018	Governor General Julie Payette	Consul General John Cruickshank	Official
Burkina Faso	23-26 October 2018	Governor General Julie Payette	President Roch Marc Christian Kabore	State
Ivory Coast	26-28 October 2018	Governor General Julie Payette	President Alassane Ouattara	State
Nigeria	28-30 October 2018	Governor General Julie Payette	President Muhammadu Buhari	State
Belgium	10 November 2018	Governor General Julie Payette	King Philippe	Official
Mexico	30 November-1 December 2018	Governor General Julie Payette	President Enrique Pena Nieto, President Andrés Manuel López Obrador	Official
Kazakhstan	3-5 December 2018	Governor General Julie Payette	President Nursultan Nazarbayev	Official
Kuwait	18–19 January 2019	Governor General Julie Payette	Sheikh Sabah al-Ahmad al-Jaber al-Sabah	Official
Iraq	19–21 January 2019	Governor General Julie Payette	President Barham Salih	Official
United States	15–16 March 2019	Governor General Julie Payette	António Guterres	Official
Rwanda	4–9 April 2019	Governor General Julie Payette	President Paul Kagame	Official
France	4–6 June 2019	Governor General Julie Payette	President Emmanuel Macron	Official
Peru	23–27 July 2019	Governor General Julie Payette	President Martin Vizcarra	Official
Netherlands	30–31 August 2019	Governor General Julie Payette	King Willem-Alexander	Official
Poland	1–2 September 2019	Governor General Julie Payette	President Andrzej Duda	Official
France	30 September 2019	Governor General Julie Payette	President Emmanuel Macron	Official
Lithuania	24–26 November 2019	Governor General Julie Payette	President Gitanas Nausėda	Official
Estonia	26–28 November 2019	Governor General Julie Payette	President Kersti Kaljulaid	Official
Italy	29 November-4 December 2019	Governor General Julie Payette	President Sergio Mattarella	Official
Latvia	22–23 December 2019	Governor General Julie Payette		Official
Romania	23 December 2019	Governor General Julie Payette		Official

=== 2020s ===
Visit to	Date	Representative	Received by	Type
Israel	22–24 January 2020	Governor General Julie Payette	President Reuven Rivlin	Official
Poland	27 January 2020	Governor General Julie Payette	President Andrzej Duda	Official
Germany	17–21 October, 2021	Governor General Mary Simon	President Frank-Walter Steinmeier	State
United Kingdom	15–17 March 2022	Governor General Mary Simon		Official
United Arab Emirates	17–19 March 2022	Governor General Mary Simon		Official
Qatar	21 March 2022	Governor General Mary Simon		Official
Kuwait	22–23 March 2022	Governor General Mary Simon		Official
United Kingdom	2–6 June 2022	Governor General Mary Simon		Official
Finland	6-10 February 2023	Governor General Mary Simon	President Sauli Niinistö	State

== See also ==
- Royal tours of Canada
- State and official visits to the United Kingdom
- United States presidential visits to Canada
