= LMIA (disambiguation) =

LMIA refers to Labour Market Impact Assessment, as issued by Service Canada.

LMIA may also refer to:

- Late Minoan IA period of the Minoan civilization
- Leck mich im Arsch, canon by Wolfgang Mozart
