= Saint Lucy (Barbados Parliament constituency) =

- Constituency for the House of Assembly of Barbados
- Region: Saint Lucy, Barbados

Current constituency
- Created: 1645

Saint Lucy is a constituency in the Saint Lucy parish of Barbados. It was established in 1645 as one of the original 11 constituencies. Since 2018, it has been represented in the House of Assembly of the Barbadian Parliament by Peter Phillips. Philips is a member of the BLP. (Note: As with all constituencies, the constituency elects one member of parliament (MP) by the first past the post system of election at least every five years.)

Since the introduction of the single-member system in 1971, Saint Lucy has largely leaned towards the DLP until 2018.

== Boundaries ==
The constituency runs:

From a point on the eastern sea coast north of Pico Teneriffe and east of the point at which the public road leading to Boscobel begins to turn in a south easterly direction in a straight line to this point; thence in a westerly direction along this public road from Boscobel to its junction with the Cave Hill Drive–Lamberts Road; thence continuing in a westerly direction along the Cave Hill Drive–Lamberts Road to its junction with Lamberts–Alexandra–Luke Hill Road; thence in a northerly, then westerly and south westerly direction along the middle of the Lamberts–Alexandra–Luke Hill Road to its junction with Highway A (the Rose Hill–St. Lucy’s Church Road) and the private road leading to Alleynedale Hall; thence in a westerly direction and diverting along the branch of this private road so as to leave the plantation buildings in St. Peter and then in a northerly direction to its junction with Highway 1C (the Colleton–St.Lucy’s Church Road); thence in a south westerly direction along the middle of Highway 1C to its junction with the public road leading from Shermans to Half Moon Fort; thence in a straight line to a point on the coast west of the junction of Highway 1C and the public road leading from Shermans to Half Moon Fort; thence in a northerly, north easterly and south easterly direction along the sea coast to a point on the coast north of Pico Teneriffe and east of the point at which the public road leading to Boscobel begins to turn in a south easterly direction (the starting point).

== History ==
=== Members of Parliament ===
The following list contains the Members of Parliament for the Saint Lucy since the introduction of the single-member system in 1971.

Election	Member	Party
1971	Edward Evelyn Greaves	DLP
1976	Edward Evelyn Greaves	DLP
1981	Roy Brathwaite	BLP
1986	Edward Evelyn Greaves	DLP
1991	Edward Evelyn Greaves	DLP
1994	Denis Kellman	DLP
1999	Denis Kellman	DLP
2003	Denis Kellman	DLP
2008	Denis Kellman	DLP
2013	Denis Kellman	DLP
2018	Peter Phillips	BLP
2022	Peter Phillips	BLP
