= Brendon Browne =

Saint Vincent and the Grenadines diplomat (1953–2020)

Brendon Browne (5 January 1953 – 17 February 2020) was the High Commissioner of the Organisation of Eastern Caribbean States in Ottawa in Canada from 2007 to 2011.

Browne's commission began on 14 September 2007, when he presented his credentials to the Governor General of Canada at the Citadelle of Québec.
