= Migrant laborers in the Okanagan =

Migrant laborers in the Okangan Valley of British Columbia, Canada

Migrant laborers have been employed in agricultural labour in the Okanagan Valley of British Columbia as the agricultural industry in the Okanagan has continued in growth and operation. In 2009, there were 3,000 Mexican migrant labourers working in the Okanagan.

== History ==
The racialization of agricultural labour in the Okanagan Valley reaches as far back as early settlement by white colonists during the 19th century. The first settlers in the Okanagan region focused primarily on cattle ranching, switching to fruit production in about the 1890s. It was this switch to fruit production that started the racialization of agricultural labour in the Okanagan. Part of its beginnings was the directed promotion of Okanagan Valley towards the wealthier white middle class as a very fashionable endeavour. It is through this rather successful promotional scheme that the Okanagan came to be known for its "whiteness," an issue that the area continues to be beset with today. With the influx of white Canadians to the region, many with the goal of establishing fruit orchards, migrant seasonal labour became a pressing issue as there were not enough settlers able or willing to do the manual labour involved in harvesting. The settlers' solution to this issue was to employ those of other ‘races’ or ethnicities believed by the white population to be better suited to do menial labour, and hence the beginning of the racialization of agricultural labour in the Okanagan was born.

There were various waves or periods when people of a certain ethnic category, or ‘race’ were more heavily employed as agricultural labourers then others, largely reflecting the political climate of the day. The first racialized groups to be employed as agricultural labourers were First Nations people and the Chinese, with First Nations employment beginning around the 1880s to the present and the Chinese from the early 1900s to the 1930s. Local First Nations groups were often used during the harvesting season of June to October, in addition to migrant First Nations from Washington state. After the construction of the railway by Chinese migrant workers, many were left with no work in a foreign land where racist fears severely limited the type of work Chinese migrants could do. It is for this reason that migrant Chinese were segregated into manual agricultural labour until the introduction of the $500 head tax that effectively stemmed further Chinese migration to Canada.

When the Chinese and First Nations could no longer fulfil the demands of orchardists, they switched to alternate racialized groups. During the interwar and WWII era these groups were predominantly the Doukhobors and the Japanese. With many young men off to war there was a gap in agricultural labour that needed to be filled. Reluctantly white orchardists opted to use the forced labour of interned Japanese-Canadians and migrant Doukhobor labour. Once the Japanese began to move back to the coast after the war and the Doukhobors began to migrate back to their settlements in the Nelson area, an agricultural labour gap was once again apparent and in need of filling.

This time it was the Portuguese who became the next racialized agricultural group in the Okanagan agricultural industry. However, the Portuguese were not nearly as discriminated against as the previous groups had been, largely due to their country of origin, which was less feared and more acceptable to the primarily white settler population in the Okanagan. From about the 1960s when Portuguese agricultural labour began to decline, migrant labour of young Québécois French Canadians began to be prominent in the Okanagan agricultural sector. However, this labour force eventually waned as well, leaving yet another agricultural labour gap. This time labour is coming from much farther away, however, many of the same issues that characterized the Racialized labour of the 20th century remained in the migrant labour needs of fruit tree agriculture of the Okanagan.

== Latin-American migrant workers ==
Over the last decade or so, many Latin American migrant workers began to arrive in British Columbia to work in the agricultural industry. The primary reason for the arrival of workers from as far away as Mexico is to fill the gap the Canadian farm workers refuse or are unable to fill. As a result, Mexican migrant workers face hardships in the Okanagan agricultural industry. These include, but are not limited to, housing, hours of work, employment benefits, and wages. In addition, an agreement between the Canadian and Mexican governments was signed and in accordance to this agreement Mexico is to provide Canada with agricultural workers on a seasonal basis. The period lasts for approximately eight months and occurs annually.

=== Motivation and perpetuation ===
Mexican migrant workers come to the Okanagan to work in the agricultural industry as a mere means of survival. While there are Canadians who come from the east to enjoy the weather and, at the same time, work in the orchards, some employers claim that they do not have the same work ethics as the Mexican migrant workers (see Couture, 2009 cited below for an ethnography of the Young Quebec fruit picker phenomenon). Through the agreement between the Canadian and Mexican governments, migrant workers from Mexico travel to Canada to work, however, once in Canada mobility is made very difficult. Therefore, the men and women who undertake the jobs available in the Canadian agricultural industry cannot change jobs in an effort to earn more to support their families back home.

=== Type of work and industry ===
Historically migrant agricultural labour was needed in the Okanagan for tree fruit harvesting, mainly from late June to late October. This typically included the starting of harvest with “cherries in late June, followed by apricots and peaches in July, the continuation of peaches, prunes, and some varieties of pears in August, pears, apples, grapes in September, and finally more grapes in October”. Migrant labour is only need during these various harvesting periods for relatively short periods of time. While many of these same fruits continue to be grown in the Okanagan today, a much larger focus has been given to vineyards with the burgeoning of the wine industry in the Okanagan in recent years. Cherries and apple production continue to remain dominant in agricultural production in the Okanagan Valley as well.

The migrant workers are assigned to jobs in orchards and vineyards that entail picking, fertilizing and caring for the plants. Also, processing the produce is their task. In other words, the migrant workers in the Okanagan agricultural industry have to perform the tedious jobs that the industry offers. Consequently, these migrant workers are not usually assigned administrative tasks.

=== Separation of families ===
There are many problems that Mexican migrant workers face in the agricultural industry in the Okanagan Valley. First, they are separated from their families who are at times difficult to connect with through the use of the telephone. In addition to their low wages earned workers have to purchase phone cards; however, the transportation to and from the store to make that purchase is not easily accessible because workers are located on the outskirts of town where orchards and vineyards are typically located relying solely on the employer for transportation. In the Okanagan Valley, an employer claimed that he would not pay a driver to take only 15 workers to town to pick up personal items. In other words, workers may have to spend their days off on location unless they all decide to go to town at the same time. The other alternative for them to get needed items from shopping areas is by way of foot, often at great distances.

== Developments in 2010 ==
On June 15, 2010, three hundred Mexicans marched on the Canadian Embassy in Mexico City to protest unfair treatment of Mexican migrant workers in Canada under the Seasonal Agricultural Workers Program (SAWP). According to the United Food and Commercial Workers union, the largest private union in Canada:

Under SAWP, migrant agriculture workers are typically paid minimum wage and are often subject to working and housing conditions that Canadian residents would find intolerable. SAWP workers have historically been hesitant to report dangerous working conditions or hostile employers for fear of being sent home or blacklisted from returning the next season.

Furthermore, the UFCW’s 2009–2010 report on the "Status of Migrant Farm Workers in Canada" found the conditions under which Mexican temporary workers are employed to be unacceptable.

“The denial of human rights should not be the foundation for Canada’s food supply system”, said UFCW Canada and AWA president Wayne Hanley. “But as the report details, that’s exactly what’s happening to migrant farm workers. Even worse, it’s happening with the blessing of the federal government which turns a blind eye to the dangers and abuse migrants are forced to accept if they want to keep their jobs.”
