= Barbados–Canada relations =

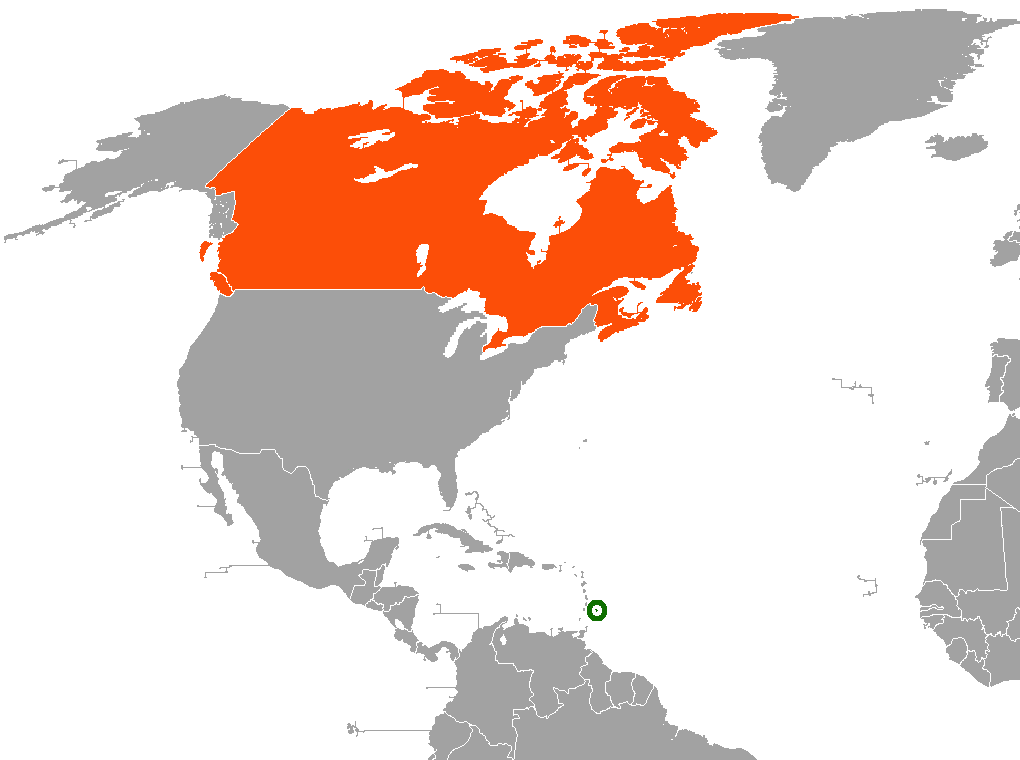

- Barbados: Canada

Diplomatic relations between Canada and Barbados date back to 1907, when the Government of Canada opened a Trade Commissioner Service to the Caribbean region located in Bridgetown, Barbados. Following Barbadian independence from the United Kingdom in November 1966, the Canadian High Commission was established in Bridgetown, Barbados on 27 September 1973. There is a High Commission of Barbados in Ottawa and a Barbadian Consulate in Toronto. The relationship between both nations today partly falls under the larger gambit of Canada–Caribbean relations.

== History ==
The relationship between the nations of Barbados and Canada extends as far back as the late 17th century. During this period, Barbados and the current provinces of Canada were a series of colonial possessions of Great Britain and France. In the early most instances of trade between the two regions, Barbados and Canada found themselves able to fill niche markets between one another's markets. The Bluenose vessels were instrumental to trade as Barbados and other islands exported their sugar and rum to the area of Canada, in return Canada exported salted cod and lumber supplies to the West Indies. This trade continued for a number of years, however these ties eventually weaned as the influence of the Thirteen American colonies grew in importance for Canada, Barbados, and the wider West Indies region.

In 1907, the Government of Canada opened its Trade Commissioner Service to the Caribbean region. This was located on the current grounds of the Queen Elizabeth Hospital in Bridgetown, Barbados.

By the early 20th century several large Canadian financial institutions looked towards expansion into the West Indies. On 16 February 1911 the Royal Bank of Canada marked the opening of their first commercial branch in Barbados. then in 1920, Canadian Imperial Bank of Commerce did the same, and finally Scotiabank followed the first two in 1956.

In 1993-1994 Barbados had sought talks on entry into the North America Free Trade Agreement (NAFTA) along with Canada, Mexico, and the United States. Although this was later abandoned in favor of having a hemispheric trade deal and because of belief that in Barbados joining NAFTA it would severely impact on the OECS states which depended on access to the Barbados market.

In 2024 under the Canada-CARICOM Strategic Partnership Canada and the region devised a plan to create a development partnership called the Caribbean Future Skills Fund in education. Which aims to develop a joint plan of cooperation in education, technical and vocational training.

== Economic relations ==
A growing legion of Canadian businesses and companies have established operations offering services in Barbados. Barbados is one of the largest recipients of Canadian Foreign Direct Investment.

During the Fifth Barbados Charity Ball held in Canada David Thompson, the Prime Minister of Barbados and also its Minister of Finance announced that Canadians represent some 75% of the international financial community in Barbados. The Canadian government has also played an extremely critical role in the continuation of the Barbados-based Caribbean Development Bank since its inception and acts as a significant lending country to the institution. The Government of Barbados is part of the Government of Canada's constituency at the International Monetary Fund and the World Bank.

== Politics ==
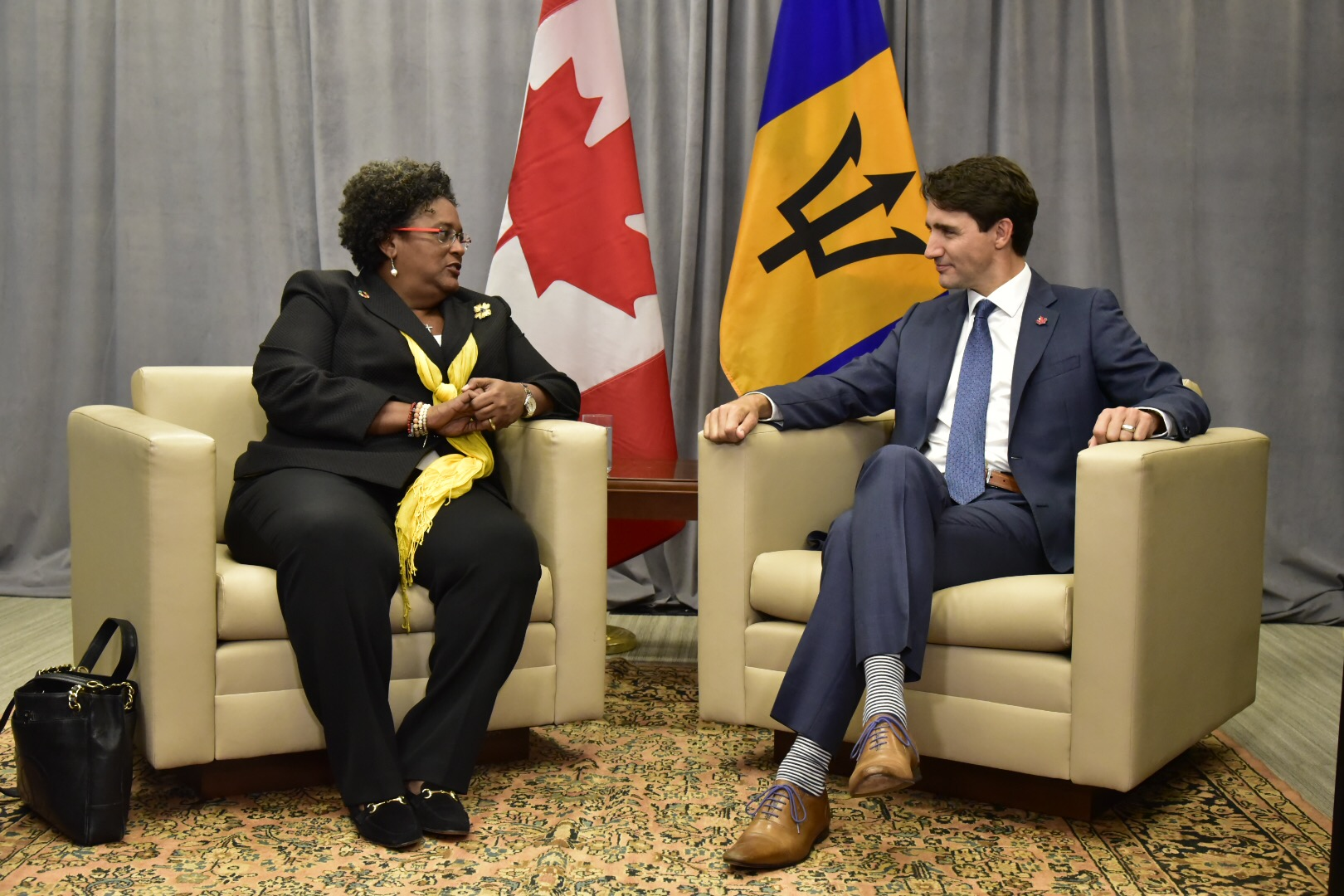
Bilatarel meeting between Prime Ministers Mia Mottley and Justin Trudeau, during the 2018 United Nations General Assembly

Around the time of the various colonies of Canada entering into the agreement for confederation, the powerful Barbados Agricultural Society, which was made up of influential Bajan plantation owners, put together a proposition for Barbados to take part in this Canadian confederation as well. The proposal was made to Sir Francis Hincks, but the deal did not proceed and Barbados' interest subsided. It was not until the 1950s, just prior to the country of Barbados negotiating independence from the United Kingdom, that yet another movement for establishing some form of political association with Canada was broached yet again, this time spurred by several Barbadian members of parliament. As part of Canada's 150th anniversary, and Barbados's 50th anniversary of independence, the Central Bank of Barbados produced a segment regarding relations with Canada. The related paper by the Central Bank of Barbados reviewed all aspects of relations between both nations including previous movement towards political union.

In 2007, Canada's Prime Minister Stephen Harper announced the desire to heighten Canada's profile in the Americas. As part of his plan, Harper and his Canadian envoy visited several nations of Latin America and the Caribbean regions which included Barbados. Stephen Harper took part in several closed-door meetings with the then Barbadian prime minister Owen Arthur and the other heads of the Caribbean Community (CARICOM) group of nations. Since Harper's visit, Canada and Barbados have concluded a mutual skies agreement and are currently in the process of working on a bilateral free trade agreement which will encompass Barbados and the rest of CARICOM.

The Canadian High Commission to Barbados and the Eastern Caribbean also spoke of the possibility of Barbadian and Canadian Companies forming joint ventures. At the time it was proposed that such an agreement could encompass infrastructure projects in the country of Barbados.

In addition to the Prime Minister's visit to Barbados, the Canadian Governor-General Michaëlle Jean also visited Barbados that same year where she met with the Governor-General of Barbados.

In 2008, the three largest stock exchanges in the Caribbean (Jamaica, Barbados, and Trinidad and Tobago) mulled the possibility that the Caribbean Stock Exchanges might seek to associate in some way with the Toronto Stock Exchange. All three of these exchanges are currently seeking to join their three bourses into a more effective single Caribbean-wide unit known as the Caribbean Exchange Network.

In 2009 The Hon. Peter Kent, Minister of State of Foreign Affairs (Americas), saluted Barbados on achieving the country's 43rd anniversary of independence. In a press release the minister stated: "Canada salutes the people of Barbados as they mark their country's independence, Canada and Barbados have a long tradition of very close relations based on common values, people-to-people links and shared Commonwealth history."

The Crown Corporations known as the Barbados Water Authority and Canadian Commercial Corporation signed a $58 million deal in 2013 for the latter to help roll out fully digital water meters across the island of Barbados. The deal was facilitated through the Canadian High Commission office in Barbados.

In 2014 a trade mission from Barbados visited Nova Scotia to strengthen the level of trade among the two Atlantic regions.

In the spirit of close friendly relations in 2016, the Royal Newfoundland Constabulary of Canada announced an April Fools' Day joke via Twitter that it had arranged a deal with the Government of Barbados for RNC officers to jointly patrol the beaches and other tourist areas of Barbados along with the local Royal Barbados Police Force during the Canadian winters.

== Migration ==
A number of women from Canada come together to form The Canadian Women's Club of Barbados social club.

=== Canadians in Barbados ===
- Eugene Melnyk (Canadian Businessman)
- Pierre McMaster – Launched the Barbados-based mobile phone company Ozone Wireless.

=== Barbadians in Canada ===
- Austin Clarke –novelist.
- Anne Cools – Cools an Independent member, became the first person of afro-descent to be appointed Canadian Senate. Cools first entered into Canadian politics in 1978. She was appointed to the Senate in 1984.
- Alan Emtage – Emtage developed one of the first examples of an Internet search utility.
- Peter Fenty – Canada's first Black Bishop of the Anglican Church of Canada.
- Keith Forde – Forde was the first visible minority Deputy Chief of Police in the history of the Toronto Police Service
- Joe Fortes – the first official lifeguard in the city of Vancouver.
- George Lamming – A novelist.
- Richard Clement Moody – A Barbadian who established the then Colony of British Columbia (1858–66).
- Patricia Whittaker – A 2006 candidate who sought in 2006 to become Leader of the Liberal Party of Canada after former Canadian Prime Minister, Paul Martin stepped down.

== Tourism ==
During the 1970s, Canada became the largest source of tourists to Barbados. In 1979, roughly 97,000 Canadians visited the island of Barbados. Over time Barbados has seen market share from Canada shift towards lower cost Caribbean destinations such as Cuba or the Dominican Republic. Still yet many Canadians vacation in Barbados including past prime ministers. In 1965 one of Canada's former Prime Ministers, John Diefenbaker was saved by a future prime minister of Canada, John Turner after The Hon. Diefenbaker waded out too far in usually strong surf one morning.

On 3 November 2008, WestJet commenced the airline's inaugural flight to Barbados. The main competitor of WestJet on this route is Air Canada. The airline announced the start of a four-flights per week schedule going from Toronto, Ontario to Barbados. During the post-inaugural flight ceremony held at the executive lounge of the Grantley Adams International Airport the Barbadian Minister of Tourism Richard Sealy said that the Barbados Tourism Authority was currently seeking to increase its tourism from Canada. He also offered opportunity to collaborate in the future with WestJet should they need a regional Caribbean hub. According to the Barbados Advocate newspaper Sealy stated "We are game if Westjet is interested, in becoming the regional hub for more of your business and we would certainly like to see not four flights a week, but eventually, if we can have a daily service. Grantley Adams is already an established hub and we can feed business into the other territories. So I think there are some possibilities for even greater levels of cooperation with Westjet" he remarked to his Canadian counterparts.

== Bilateral agreements ==
| Date | Agreement name | Law ref. number | Note |
|---|---|---|---|
| 1967 | Canadian Seasonal Agricultural Workers Program (C/MSAWP), | | Formerly: Canadian Farm Labour programme (CFLP) |
| January 1980 | Double Taxation Agreement, | E102234 – CTS 1980 No. 29 | |
| January 1986 | Social Security Agreement, | | |
| January 1997 | Foreign Investment Protection Agreement – Bilateral Investment Treaty (BIT) | CTS 1997/4 | |
| May 2003 | Transfer of Offenders Treaty | E104967 | |
| March 2008 | Open Skies Agreement | No. H 067/08 | The 2008 agreement supersedes the 1985 air agreement. |

== Resident diplomatic missions ==
Both nations maintain direct high-level diplomatic representatives.

- High Commission of Barbados in Ottawa
- Consulate of Barbados in Toronto
- High Commission of Canada in Bridgetown

=== High Commission of Barbados in Ottawa ===
The High Commission is the primary diplomatic mission of Barbados in Canada. Among the initial diplomatic missions to be established by Barbados after the attainment of independence from Britain

Initially the Office of the Barbados High Commission was established in June 1967 at: 151 Slater Street, Suite 200. It remained for a number of years before relocating.

The High Commission further represents the Government of Barbados in many areas including helping to facilitate the Seasonal Agricultural Workers Program in Canada. In years past it collaborated with various institutions in Canada including: the National Council of Barbadian Associations of Canada Inc. (NCBAC), the Barbados (Ottawa) Association Inc., and the Barbados Family & Friends Club. As of 26 July 2008 E. Evelyn Greaves is the resident Barbados government representative and High Commissioner to Canada, having succeeded Glyne Samuel Hyvesta Murray.

In 1989, the Barbados High Commission then under High Commissioner established the annual Errol Barrow Memorial Trust of Canada which awards worthy Canadians with educational scholarships. The 2013 fundraiser dinner and awards was hosted at the Ottawa City Hall.

The High Commissioner has participated in a number of community events in Ottawa including a major fund raising campaign for the Queensway Carleton Hospital Care Grows West expansion-project for which over CAD$5 million was raised.

== Gallery ==
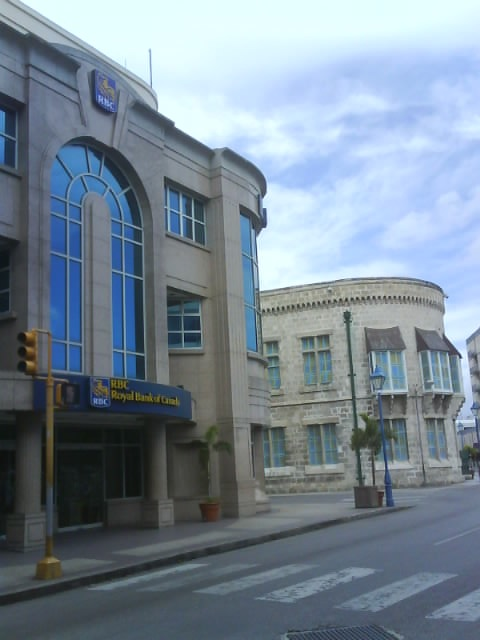
An RBC branch next to the Parliament of Barbados

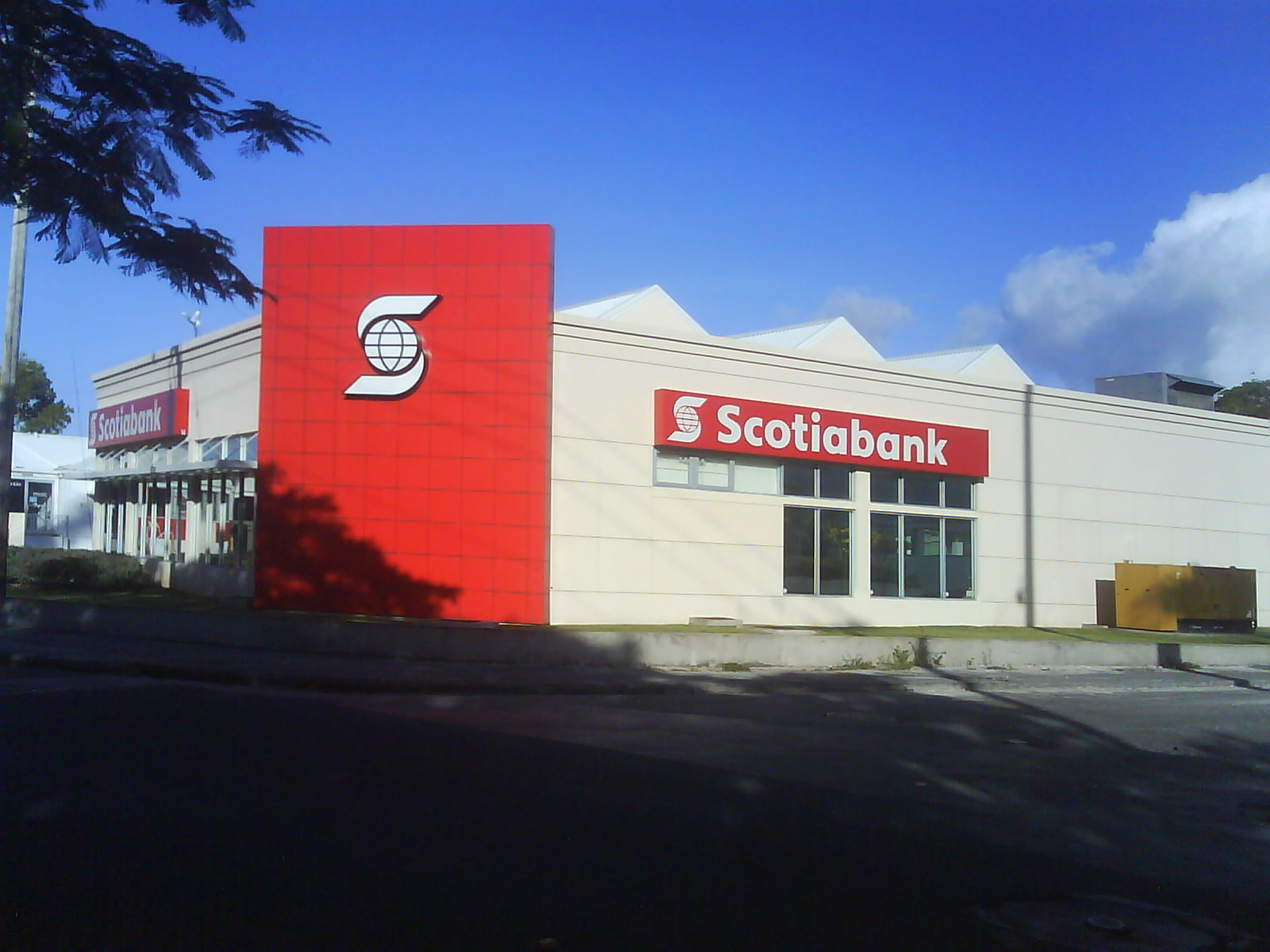
A Scotiabank branch in Hastings, Christ Church

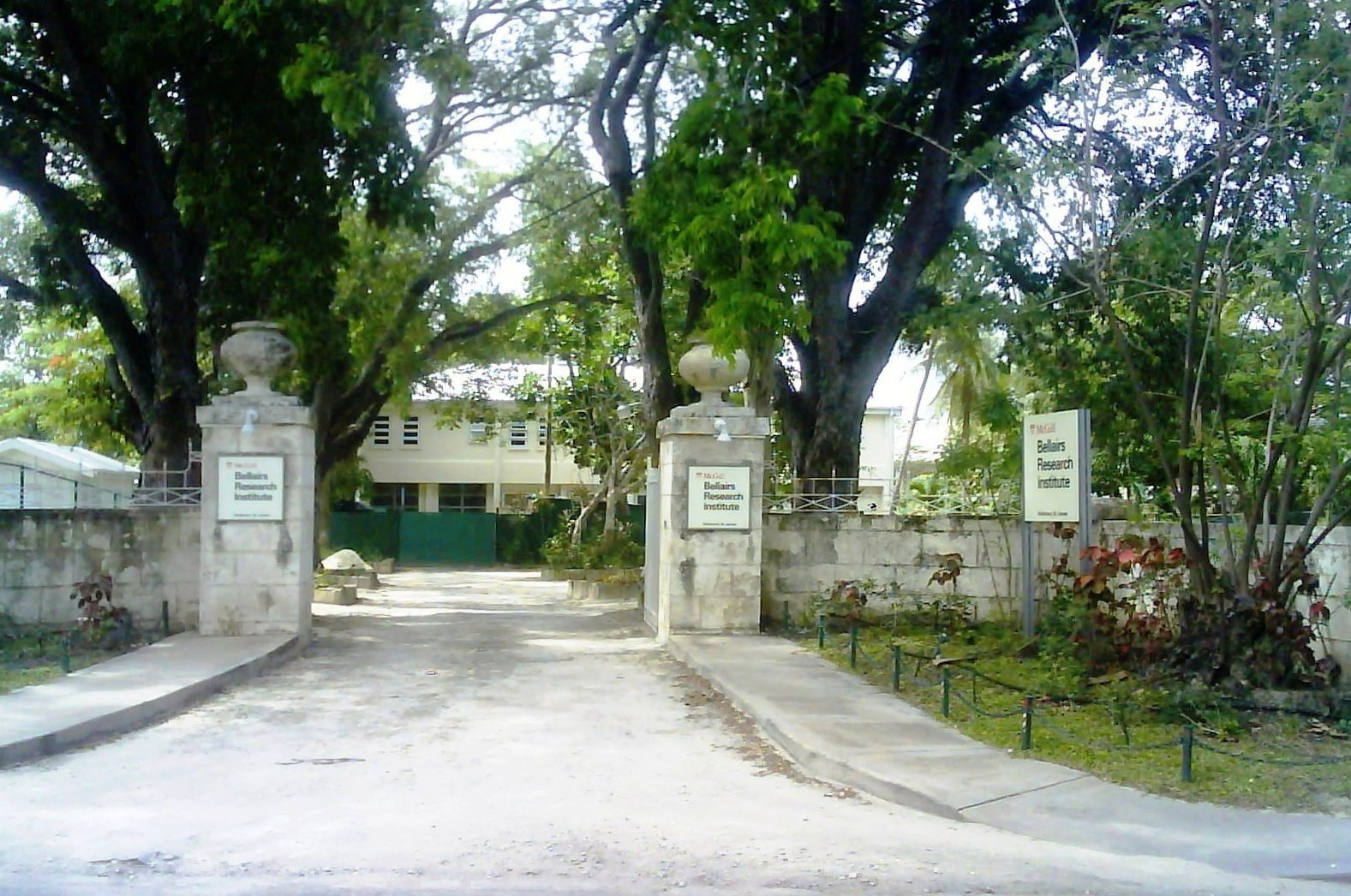
The Bellairs Research Institute of McGill University at Holetown

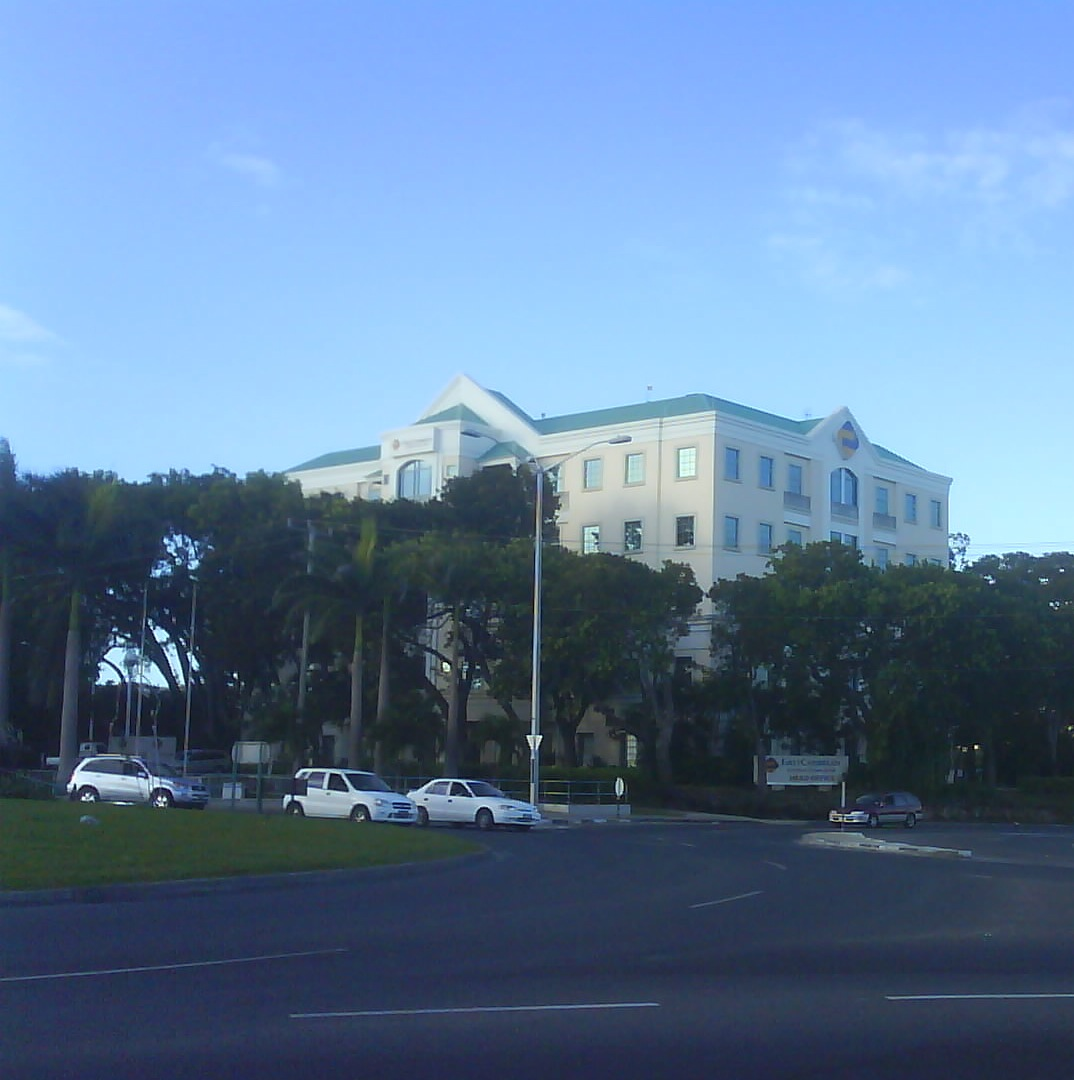
Caribbean region head office of Canadian Imperial Bank of Commerce First Caribbean International Bank

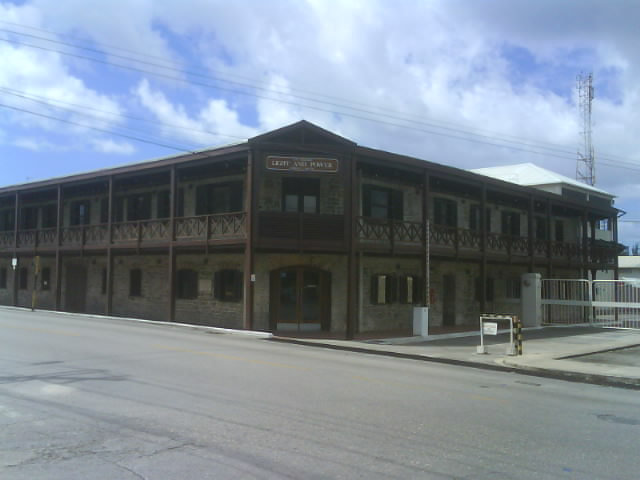
Barbados Light and Power headquarters (A subsidiary of Emera, N.S.)
