= Peter Phillips (Barbadian politician) =

Barbadian politician

Member of the House of Assembly of Barbados for Saint Lucy
- Incumbent
- Assumed office 24 May 2018
- Preceded by: Denis Kellman

Personal details
- Party: Barbados Labour Party

Peter R. Phillips is a Barbadian politician from the Barbados Labour Party (BLP).

== Political career ==
In the 2018 Barbadian general election, Phillips was elected in Saint Lucy. He was reelected in 2022 and 2026. Until 2021, he was Minister in the Ministry of Agriculture and Food Security. Phillips was reassigned to the portfolio of Minister in the Ministry of Housing, Lands and Maintenance with effect from 30 August 2021.
