= Edward Evelyn Greaves =

Barbadian politician (1940–2018)

Education Officer at Barbados Workers Union (BWU)
- In office 1968–1974

Deputy General Secretary and head of BWU Labour College
- In office 1974–1996

Member of Parliament for constituency of St. Lucy
- In office 1971–1981

Senator
- In office 1981–1986

Member of Cabinet of Barbados
- In office 1986–1994

High Commissioner of Barbados To Canada
- In office 2008–2015

Personal details
- Born: 19 April 1940 Pie Corner, St. Lucy, Barbados
- Died: 22 September 2018 (age 78)
- Party: Democratic Labour Party(DLP)
- Spouse: Julia Francilia
- Children: Stacey Greaves; Lauralynn Greaves
- Education: University West Indies(B.A.); Rutgers State University of New JerseyMEd in Labour Studies

Edward Evelyn Greaves (19 April 1940 - 22 September 2018) was High Commissioner of Barbados to Canada from 2008 until 2015. He was previously a representative for the constituency of St. Lucy (1971–1981) and (1986–1994).

== Family and education ==
Edward Evelyn Greaves was born at Pie Corner in the Parish of St. Lucy in the Island of Barbados on 19 April 1940. He received his early education at St. Clement’s Boys’ School and his secondary education at the Coleridge and Parry School and Harrison College. Greaves graduated from the University of the West Indies (Cave Hill Campus) with an honours degree in history and economics (1967) and from Rutgers, the State University of New Jersey, U.S., with a master's degree in education (Labor Studies- 1971).

== High Commission of Barbados, Ottawa ==
Greaves was the Barbados government representative and High Commissioner to Canada until 2015. He replaced Glyne Samuel Hyvesta Murray. He was invited to serve as High Commissioner of Barbados to Canada by the newly elected prime minister of Barbados, David Thompson. The Barbadian High Commissioner in Ottawa is also concurrently accredited as non-resident ambassador to Australia and New Zealand.

== Personal life ==
Edward Evelyn Greaves was married to Julia Francilia Greaves and had two children: Stacey Greaves and Lauralynn Greaves.

== See also ==
- Barbados–Canada relations
- Canadian High Commission in Barbados
- High Commission of Barbados, Ottawa
- List of ambassadors and high commissioners to Canada
