= Canada–Dominican Republic relations =

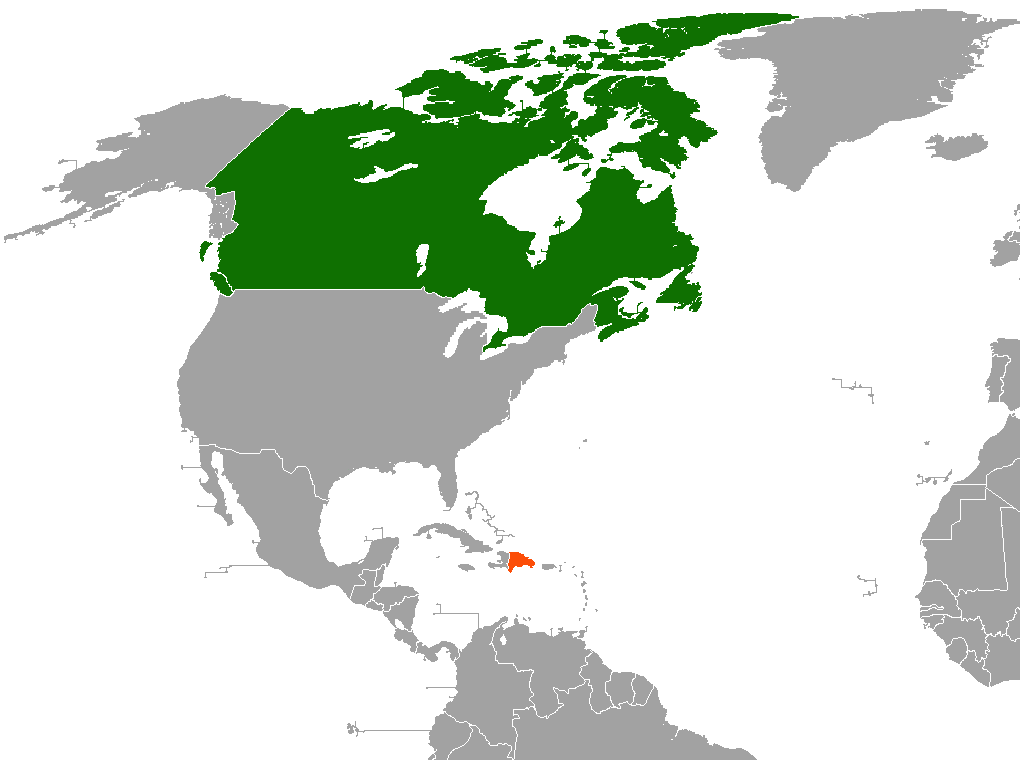

- Canada: Dominican Republic

Canada and the Dominican Republic established bilateral relations in 1954. Both nations are members of the Organization of American States and the United Nations.

== History ==
Formal diplomatic relations were established between both nations in 1954. In 2017, the DR was the largest trading partner of Canada in the Caribbean. The DR maintains observer status in the Organisation internationale de la Francophonie, an organization that Canada is a full member of. Canada offered 177 students in the DR scholarships to Canadian Universities under The Emerging Leaders of the Americas program.

== Trade ==
The DR exported US$490 Million worth of goods to Canada in 2019, with the largest export being gold. Canada exported US$163 Million worth of goods, with wheat being the largest export.

== Immigration ==
Dominican Canadians are the fastest growing ethnic group from the Caribbean. As of 2016, there were 23,130 people in Canada with full or partial Dominican ancestry. Most Dominicans live in Quebec or Ontario. Montreal has the largest Dominican population in Canada with 6,690 residents of Dominican descent.

== Resident diplomatic missions ==
- Canada maintains an embassy in Santo Domingo and maintains an office of the embassy in Punta Cana.
- Dominican Republic maintains an embassy in Ottawa and consulates-general in Montreal and Toronto.

== See also ==
- Foreign relations of Canada
- Foreign relations of the Dominican Republic
- Canada–Caribbean relations
