= Labour Market Impact Assessment =

Permit needed by some Canadian employers

A Labour Market Impact Assessment (French: étude d’impact sur le marché du travail, LMIA) is a document that an employer in Canada may need to receive prior to hiring a foreign worker.

The LMIA system has been associated in some reports with cases of fraud and job offer scams targeting temporary foreign workers, where individuals are misled into paying fees in exchange for promised employment or work permits.

== Background ==
When a Canadian employer is seeking to hire a foreign worker, it must first be determined if an LMIA is needed or if the position is LMIA-exempt before applying for a work permit. A work permit allows a foreign worker to legally work in Canada and is granted by Immigration, Refugees and Citizenship Canada if applying online or in paper, or by Canada Border Services Agency if applying in person at a port of entry. If the position that the employer is hiring the foreign worker for requires an LMIA, it must be confirmed before a Canadian employer can hire a temporary foreign worker in Canada. A positive LMIA, sometimes called a confirmation letter, indicates that there is a need for the temporary foreign worker and that no Canadians or permanent residents of Canada are available to do the job. To obtain an LMIA, an employer must send an application to the Temporary Foreign Worker Program administered by Employment and Social Development Canada.

There are some exceptions which allow a Canadian employer to hire a foreign worker and for the foreign worker to be issued a work permit without an LMIA confirmation. There is a list of LMIA-exempt jobs and their corresponding exemption codes provided by the Government of Canada.

== History ==
With the COVID-19 pandemic and the resulting high unemployment rate in Canada, Service Canada has delayed the processing of certain types of LMIA applications. As of August 2020, there is an indication that the Owner Operator category of LMIA processing has resumed. On April 1, 2021, Service Canada removed the Owner Operator advertising variation and the alternative approach for a business owner now requires an advertising period and can be successfully navigated as a Self-Employed LMIA.

Historically, the program has been widely abused and has fostered a thriving underground market that exploits the desperation of temporary foreign workers due to weak auditing and vetting mechanisms. Despite laws prohibiting the sale of jobs or LMIA documents, many employers profit by working with fraudulent recruiters, lawyers, or consultants who take advantage of workers’ limited knowledge and options. Once in Canada, many of these workers are often forced into exploitative labour conditions resembling modern slavery. Employers may withhold wages, threaten deportation, or demand additional payments to maintain sponsorship. This pattern of manipulation has turned Canada’s foreign worker programs into profit-driven systems built on human vulnerability.
