= High Commission of the Organisation of Eastern Caribbean States in Ottawa =

Diplomatic mission in Canada

- Location: Ottawa
- Address: Albert Street
- Coordinates: 45.4211°N 75.697°W

The High Commission of the Organisation of Eastern Caribbean States in Ottawa (OECS) was a regional High Commission office for multiple island-nations that are members of the Organisation of Eastern Caribbean States. The office was located on Albert Street in the Canadian capital Ottawa. The office was closed permanently in 2011 for financial reasons. It has been replaced by an Eastern Caribbean Liaison Service which works with the Canada/Caribbean Seasonal Agricultural Workers Programme

== Overview ==
The goals of the High Commission for the OECS include: consular services, as well as the promotion of economic, political and cultural interests of the member territories, in addition to the fostering of good Canada-OECS state relations.

The six islands nations under the auspice of the OECS-High Commission include:

- Antigua and Barbuda
- Dominica
- Grenada
- Saint Kitts and Nevis
- Saint Lucia
- Saint Vincent and the Grenadines

There are also three British overseas territories in the OECS: Anguilla, the British Virgin Islands, and Montserrat.

The former representative and High Commissioner to Canada is Brendon C. Browne, who has held the position since 2007. Browne has Bachelor of Arts (1980) and Master of Arts (1981) degrees from the University of Windsor in Ontario and is a former cabinet secretary in Saint Vincent and the Grenadines.

== See also ==
- The Canadian High Commission in Barbados
- List of embassies and high commissions in Ottawa
- Canada-Caribbean relations
