= Ruth Archibald =

Canadian diplomat

Ruth Archibald is a Canadian diplomat and former political organizer. She is the current Canadian high commissioner in Bridgetown with responsibility for Barbados and the Eastern Caribbean.

== Education ==
Archibald is an alumna of Edgehill School, now Kings-Edgehill School, in Windsor, Nova Scotia. She has a degree in English and political science from Memorial University.

== Political career ==
Archibald was an organizer with the Progressive Conservative Party of Ontario from 1972 to 1988. She was campaign manager for Dennis Timbrell in the party's November 1985 leadership contest, in which Timbrell was narrowly defeated by Larry Grossman. She later served as the party's deputy campaign chair in the 1987 provincial election, overseeing nine regional organizations. In August 1987, she remarked that more women were running for public office than was the case ten years earlier.

The Ontario PCs were defeated in the 1987 election, and Archibald became employed later in the year as a special assistant to federal Progressive Conservative cabinet minister Barbara McDougall. When McDougall was appointed as Canada's minister of employment and immigration in 1988, she retained Archibald as her chief of staff and principal policy advisor on immigration issues. In this capacity, Archibald supported McDougall's efforts to significantly increase the overall rate of immigration to Canada. Archibald resigned in 1992 after a disagreement over the minister's decision to continue flying first-class on international trips despite a government directive that forbade the practice.

== Diplomatic career ==
Archibald joined Canada's foreign affairs department in 1993. The following year, she was alternate leader of the Canadian delegation to a United Nations population conference in Cairo. She helped negotiate its Program of Action and, at one stage, noted the difficulty of committing programs and services for women while also recognizing international cultural differences. She welcomed the final document, which many regarded as a victory for women's reproductive rights. Archibald was later a delegate to the 1995 United Nations conference on women in Beijing and chaired a committee that reached a compromise agreement on the right of young people to sex education. She also chaired a committee that addressed discrimination based on sexual orientation.

Archibald was director-general of the global issues bureau at Canada's foreign affairs department in 1997 and worked on Canada's efforts to ban land mines.

In 1998, Archibald was appointed as Canada's high commissioner to Sri Lanka with concurrent accreditation for the Maldives. At a conference two years later, she acknowledged that the Liberation Tigers of Tamil Eelam (LTTE) were active in Canada. She was quoted as saying, "Probably none of the monies collected by the LTTE in Canada ended up in Sri Lanka, but may be going towards the purchase of arms in other countries. We need the co-operation of other countries to look into this."

Archibald met S.P. Thamilchelvam, the leader of the LTTE's political wing, in the northern Wanni jungle in April 2001, during a six-day trip to monitor Canadian-funded humanitarian projects. This was the first time that a Canadian diplomat met with a leader of the rebel group, and Archibald later told the media that the meeting was "a coincidence," held in response to an LTTE request after she arrived in the region. During the meeting, she told Thamilchelvam that Canada was interested in seeking a peaceful resolution to the Sri Lankan conflict and believed the fighting would need to stop. This meeting took place in the context of a Norwegian-led peace process between the Sri Lankan government and the LTTE; the process later broke down, and the civil war resumed.

Archibald returned to Canada in 2002 to work in the Canadian foreign ministry's international crime and terrorism department. She led the Canadian delegation in meetings of an Indo-Canadian Joint Working Group on counter-terrorism.

In 2006, Archibald was appointed as Canada's high commissioner to South Africa. Over the following year, she also received accreditation as Canada's representative for Mauritius, Namibia, Lesotho, and Swaziland. In 2009, she was appointed resident high commissioner to Bridgetown, Barbados, with concurrent accreditation to Antigua and Barbuda, the Commonwealth of Dominica, Grenada, Saint Kitts and Nevis, Saint Lucia, and Saint Vincent and the Grenadines.

Diplomatic posts
Preceded by Konrad Sigurdson	High Commissioner to Maldives; 1998-2002	Succeeded by Valerie Raymond
Preceded by Konrad Sigurdson	High Commissioner to Sri Lanka; 1998-2002	Succeeded by Valerie Raymond
Preceded by Sandelle D. Scrimshaw	High Commissioner to South Africa; 2006-2009	Succeeded by Adèle Dion
Preceded by Sandelle D. Scrimshaw	High Commissioner to Mauritius; 2006-2009	Succeeded by Adèle Dion
Preceded by Sandelle D. Scrimshaw	High Commissioner to Namibia; 2006-2009	Succeeded by Adèle Dion
Preceded by Sandelle D. Scrimshaw	High Commissioner to Lesotho; 2007-2009	Succeeded by Adèle Dion
Preceded by Sandelle D. Scrimshaw	High Commissioner to Swaziland; 2007-2009	Succeeded by Adèle Dion
Preceded by Michael C. Welsh	High Commissioner to Barbados; 2009-2012	Succeeded by
