= Canada–Grenada relations =

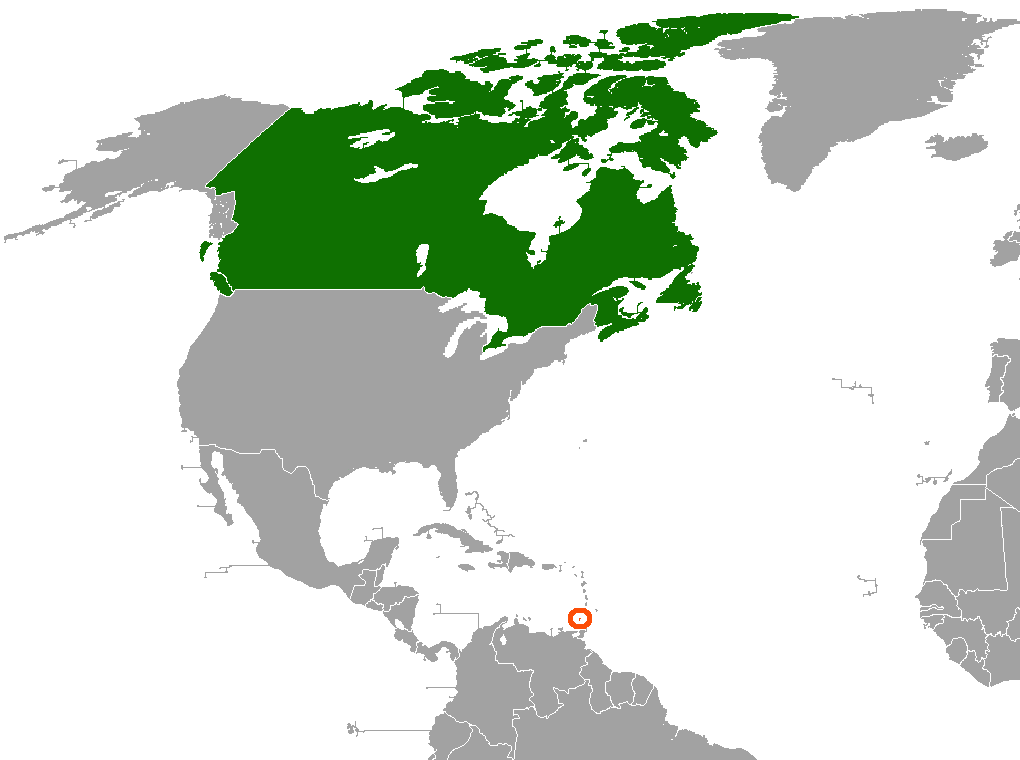

- Canada: Grenada

Canada and recognized Grenada and also formally established diplomatic relations on 7 February 1974, as the same day as Grenada got independence from the United Kingdom. Both countries are members of the Commonwealth of Nations and Organization of American States.

== History ==
Early bilateral interactions occurred as both countries shared their colonial relationship as former parts of the British Empire.

== Trade ==
There are eight Canadian businesses in Grenada.

As today, Canadian banks have an especially large role in the Grenada commercial banking industry. Canadian banks own one of the largest banks in Grenada. In the early 1980s, the Canadian government contributed six million US dollar for the contraction of the Point Salines International, as today known as the Maurice Bishop International Airport.

== Canadian Business companies in Grenada ==
- First Caribbean International Bank
- Scotia Bank

- Royal Bank of Canada

== Diplomatic missions ==
- Canada is accredited to Grenada from its high commission in Bridgetown, Barbados.
- Grenada has a consulate-general in Toronto.

== Bilateral agreements ==
Date	Agreement name	Law ref. number	Note
8 February 1977	Agreement relating to Canadian Investments in Grenada Insured by Canada through its Agent, the Export Development Corporation	1977/10	
15 October 1987	General Agreement on Development Co-operation		Came into force on 17 June 1997.
8 January 1998	Agreement on Social Security	1999/51	Come into force on 1 February 1999.
