= High Commission of Canada, Bridgetown =

Diplomatic mission of Canada to Barbados

Coordinates: 13.0951°N 59.6°W

High Commission of Canada in Barbados
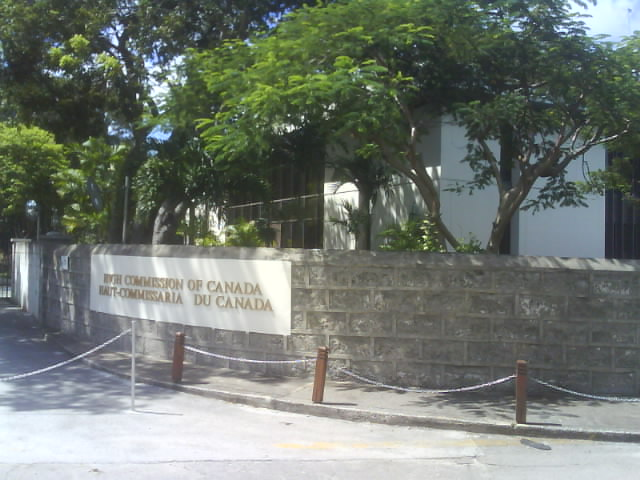
- Canadian High Commission (in Bridgetown)
- Location: Saint Michael, Barbados
- Address: Bishop's Court Hill
- High Commissioner: Marie Legault

The High Commission of Canada in Barbados (French: Haut-commissariat du Canada à la Barbade) is Canada's main diplomatic mission to Barbados. The exact location is Bishop's Hill Court in Bridgetown, St. Michael. The auspices of the High Commission to Barbados also accredited to Eastern Caribbean counterpart islands of Antigua and Barbuda, Dominica, Grenada, Saint Kitts and Nevis, Saint Lucia and Saint Vincent and the Grenadines, as well as three British overseas territories: Anguilla, the British Virgin Islands and Montserrat. It also includes consular and trade services for Guadeloupe, Martinique, Saint-Martin and Sint Maarten.

The High Commission provides business and consular services to residents and visitors to and from Canada. Additionally, the High Commissioner also serves as the honorary leader of the non-profit Canada Barbados Business Association (CCBA) organization and a liaison for Canada to the Caribbean Development Bank (CDB) and the inter-island military protection service known as the Regional Security System (RSS). The current resident High Commissioner from Canada stationed in Bridgetown is Brenda Wills, who has a long career in international diplomacy. The office of the High Commissioner also works with the 3,000-4,000 registered Canadian permanent residents who reside in Barbados.

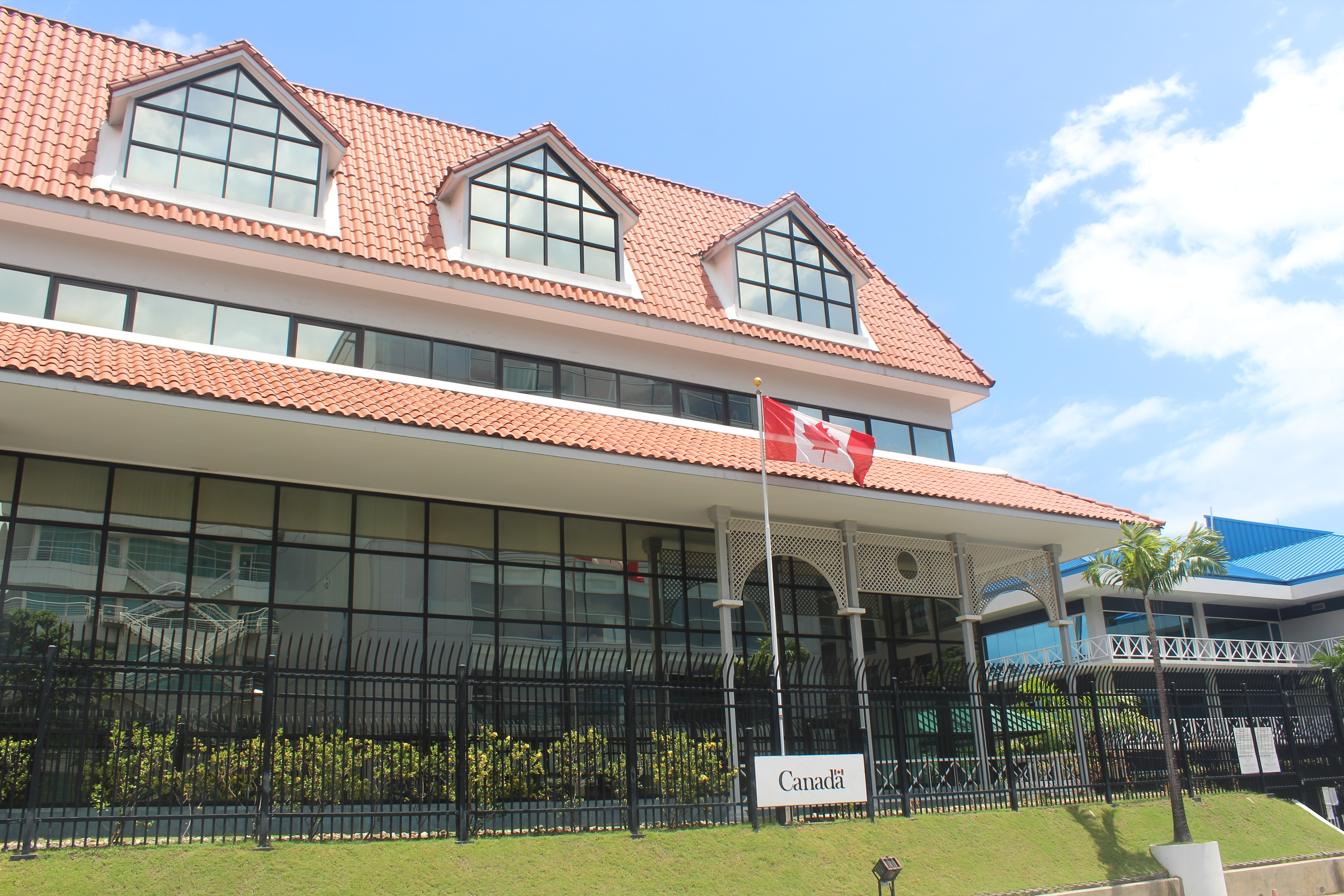
Canadian High Commission, Port of Spain, Trinidad & Tobago

Canadian immigration services were moved from Barbados to Trinidad in recent years for the purposes of cost savings. This means that all Caribbean people applying to immigrate to Canada from islands surrounding Barbados must apply through the office in Port of Spain, Trinidad.

In 2011 the High Commission investigated relocating as it was believed it might have been built above a cave.

== Past high commissioners ==
- James Russell McKinney (1966/11/30 – 1969/07/19)
- Gerald Anthony Rau (1969/08/21 – 1972/07/24)
- David Chalmer Reece (1972/08/28 – 1973/09/27)
- Lawrence Austin Haynes Smith^{†} (1973/09/27 – 1977/11/05)
- Trevor John Pinnacle (1977/11/05 – 1979/01/18)
- Allan Barclay Roger (1979/01/18 – 1983/08/28)
- Noble Edward Charles Power^{‡} (1983/10/13 – 1987/10/31)
- Arthur Robert Wright (1987/11/09 – 1990/07/29)
- Janet P. Zukowsky (1990/10/08 – 1994/00/00)
- Colleen Swords (1994/08/31 – 1997?)
- Duane Van Beselaere (1997/10/30 – 2000/08/11)
- Sandelle D. Scrimshaw (2000/09/13 – 2004?)
- Michael C. Welsh (2004/08/09 – 2007?)
- David Marshall (2007/08/31 – 2009?)
- Ruth Archibald (2009- 2012)
- Richard Hanley (2012-2016)
- Marie Legault (current)

Notes

- Canadian diplomatic recognition of independent Barbados was given on 30 November 1966. The High Commissioner to Trinidad and Tobago was concurrently accredited as High Commissioner to Barbados, though resident in Trinidad and Tobago.
- ^{†} Smith Lawrence Austin Hayne - Mr. Smith became the first resident Canadian High Commissioner to Barbados, when a High Commission was established in Barbados on 27 September 1973.
- ^{‡} Power Noble Edward Charles - Since 1983, the High Commissioner to Barbados has also held the position of Commissioner to the British Virgin Islands.

== See also ==
- Barbados–Canada relations
- Canada–Caribbean relations
- High Commission of Barbados in Ottawa
- High Commission of the Organisation of Eastern Caribbean States in Ottawa (OECS)
