= Temporary residency in Canada =

Canadian legal status

In Canada, temporary residency (French: résidence temporaire) applies to those who are not Canadian citizens but are legally in Canada for a temporary purpose, including international students, foreign workers, and tourists.

Whereas "Permanent Residence" (PR) is a requirement for Canadian citizenship, temporary residency has little to do with citizenship, in that one cannot go from temporary resident to citizen without first going through another program. More specifically, the classes of Temporary Resident Documents under IMM1442 are as follows:

- Temporary Student — study permit (also IMM1208),
- Temporary Worker — work permit (also IMM 1102),
- Temporary Visitor — visitor record (also IMM 1097),
- Temporary Resident Permit holder who require the permit to overcome inadmissibility issues

Some foreign nationals require a Temporary Resident Visa (French: visa de résident temporaire) to visit Canada.

It is against Canadian federal law to bring in temporary foreign workers if Canadian workers are available. For an employer to hire a foreign worker or to allow a foreign worker to in Canada, they may need obtain a Labour Market Impact Assessment (LMIA). A positive LMIA or a confirmation letter grants permission to the employer who proves that there is a need for a foreign worker to fill the job as no Canadian worker is available and that such hiring will not negatively impact the Canadian labour market.

== Temporary Foreign Worker Program ==
The Temporary Foreign Worker Program (French: Programme des travailleurs étrangers temporaires, TFWP) is a program of the Government of Canada that allows employers in Canada to hire foreign nationals. Workers brought in under the program are referred to as Temporary Foreign Workers (TFWs) and are allowed to work in positions that are not filled by Canadians. The aim was to address skill shortages and promote economic growth. Initially, the program was aimed at nurses and farm workers, but today it gives highly skilled and less skilled workers the opportunity to work in Canada. Unlike applicants for permanent residence, the Canada's Temporary Foreign Worker Program (TFWP) does not have a cap on the number of applicants admitted; instead, numbers are dictated primarily by employer demand.

Between 1993 and 2013, the total number of TFW more than doubled to 338,189 workers; between 2006 and 2014 alone, over 500,000 workers were brought into Canada under the program. When TFWP began in 1973, most of the individuals brought in were high-skill workers, such as medical specialists. In 2002, however, a "low-skilled workers" category was added, which now makes up most of the temporary foreign workforce. In 2006, the program was expanded, introducing fast-tracking for some locations. It was revised again in 2013, raising wages, charging employer fees, and removing the accelerated applications.

From 2002 and 2011, the number of temporary foreign workers (TFW) residing in Canada had a three-fold increase, from about 101,000 to 300,000. For the first time in 2007, overall temporary migration overtook permanent migration, with the highest increase being in the number of TFWs that entered the country, and within that the largest increase accounted for those in lower-skilled occupations in farming, caregiving, service & retail, clerical work, manufacturing and construction. There was also a 73% increase in the number of entries and re-entries into the country in the 2002-2008 period.

The expansion of the TFWP to accommodate workers in lower-skilled occupations has been influenced by general increased employer demand of lower-skilled workers, particularly in the oil, gas, and construction sectors. In 2002, the pilot project for Hiring Foreign Workers in Occupations that Require Lower Levels of Formal Training was introduced. The project has since evolved to better suit employers needs, for example by increasing the length of the work permit from 12 to 24 months. However this is not the case for those entering through 2 occupation-specific programs: the Live-in Caregiver Program (LCP) or the Seasonal Agricultural Workers Program (SAWP).

In 2018, the number of workers allowed increased by 36% and more than 17,600 permits were issued. During the COVID-19 pandemic, the Canadian government, together with the TFWP, sought out to increase protection for foreign workers through protective legislation.

=== Seasonal Agricultural Worker Program ===
Implemented in 1966, more than 29,000 agricultural workers enter Canada every year through this program from the Caribbean and Mexico. The program exists as an agreement between sending countries and the Canadian government to provide seasonal agricultural workers during peak Canadian production. Particular sectors that report labour shortages are often the fruits, vegetables and horticultural sectors. Those who enter through this program can work for a maximum of 8 months per year.

In 2009, half of agricultural migrants were from Mexico (about 15,800 people). Among these migrants, 75% have been re-entering the program for 4 years or more, while 57%, for 6 years or more.

=== Live-in Caregiver Program ===
Replacing the foreign domestic movement (FDM) in 1992, the Live-in Caregiver program accepts between 2,500 and 3,500 caregivers each year. According to Immigration, Refugees and Citizenship Canada, "Live-in caregivers are individuals who are qualified to provide care for children, elderly persons or persons with disabilities in private homes without supervision."

Applicants to the program must meet certain criteria, some of which include: high school education, equivalent to Canadian standards, language ability, as well as a written contract by an employer and Employment and Social Development Canada approval that labour shortages necessitate hiring abroad.

Recruitment into this program is seen to be racialized and gendered, as 95.6% of Canada's live-in caregivers are women from the Philippines. Despite this, and unlike the SAWP, no formal labour agreement exists to govern these migratory flows. Rather, an informal Filipino community network, as well as the Philippine government's labour export strategy facilitates and regulates the continuous migratory flows between the two countries. Also unlike those who enter through the SAWP, LCP applicants can apply for permanent residency at the end of their 2-year contract.

== International Experience Canada ==
The International Experience Canada (IEC) program provides young nationals from select countries, with the opportunity to travel and work in Canada for a maximum of 24 months. Interested candidates are randomly selected depending on the spots available for their country of origin and for the category in which they are eligible.

There are three categories under IEC:

1. Working Holiday,
2. Young Professionals, and
3. International Co-op Internship.

In order to be able to participate in the IEC, the country or territory that the candidate is a citizen of must have an agreement with Canada, allowing them to apply for an IEC work permit.

Alternatively, if they do not belong to any such country or territory, they must be able to make use of a recognized organization (RO). ROs, for the purposes of IEC, include: AIESEC, GO International, International Association for the Exchange of Students for Technical Experience (IAESTE), International Rural Exchange (IRE), Memorial University of Newfoundland (MUN), Stepwest, WAP Working Holidays, University of British Columbia, and University of New Brunswick.

Furthermore, the candidate will also have to successfully meet the eligibility requirements for their country or territory of citizenship as well as of the specific pool that they are applying for. Usually, countries that have an agreement with Canada as to the IEC program allow candidates to participate in the program only 1 time. Other countries, though allowing a candidate to apply 2 times, will require the candidates to apply in different pools each of the times that they apply for the IEC.

Those holding a refugee travel document that has been issued by a country with a youth mobility agreement with Canada are not eligible to participate in the IEC program. While dependents cannot be taken along on the IEC, dependents might apply for visiting, studying, or working Canada. The applications are to be assessed separately and not along with that of the IEC candidate.

== Employment ==
Apart from their temporary status, TFWs have the same employment rights as Canadian workers, and can phone a free 1-800 number for help. However, because of the way in which the Canadian residence of a temporary foreign worker is tied to an employer, some TFWs have said they have been treated worse than Canadian co-workers.

Foreign agricultural workers make up roughly 60% of all workers coming into the country under the TFWP.

== Criticism and debate ==
Criticism surrounding temporary residents of Canada have been a longstanding and contested issue in both public discourse and federal politics. Under the 29th Canadian Ministry, public concern increased regarding immigration levels. A poll conducted by Léger found that approximately 65% of Canadians believed the federal government was admitting too many temporary residents and prospective immigrants under its immigration plan.

In January 2014, Employment Minister Jason Kenney announced a second round of reforms to the TFWP, citing dissatisfaction among workers. Further scrutiny followed in April 2014, when CBC reported on the use of temporary foreign labour by McDonald’s Canada. On April 24, Kenney announced the suspension of the TFWP for the food-services sector. The program was later reinstated with modifications. In May 2014, the Temporary Foreign Worker Program (TFWP) became the subject of debate in the House of Commons between the 28th Canadian Ministry and the opposition New Democratic Party (NDP). The NDP questioned the government over allegations that some employers were using the program to hire temporary foreign workers in regions where qualified Canadian workers were receiving Employment Insurance (EI) benefits. Reporting by CBC highlighted claims of program misuse. In response during Question Period, Prime Minister Stephen Harper stated that the government had addressed these concerns prior to 2013 through reforms to both the EI system and the TFWP. He also asserted that the NDP had not supported those reforms and that some NDP Members of Parliament had requested additional foreign workers for their constituencies.

Following the COVID-19 pandemic, the federal government under Prime Minister Justin Trudeau and the 29th Ministry expanded the admission of temporary foreign workers and increased permanent resident targets, announcing plans to admit up to 500,000 permanent residents annually by 2025. These decisions attracted significant public and political scrutiny. The Public Service of Canada reportedly raised concerns regarding insufficient housing supply and infrastructure capacity to support the increased population growth.

As of 2021, Canada had more than 775,000 temporary foreign workers, representing approximately 4% of the national workforce. Many were employed in lower-wage or lower-prestige occupations, including food service and hospitality. Several economists have argued that temporary foreign workers and international students have become increasingly central to Canada's low-wage labour market. Economist Mike Moffatt of the University of Western Ontario stated that a growing share of labour in sectors such as fast food is composed of individuals working under student permits or other temporary statuses.

During his tenure as prime minister, Mark Carney and the 30th Canadian Ministry pursued changes to Canada's immigration policy aimed at reducing the number of temporary residents, including temporary foreign workers and international students. Carney's government maintained and built upon existing immigration targets in the 2025–2027 Immigration Levels Plan, which included specific caps on temporary resident admissions as part of efforts to address housing pressures and other infrastructure strains in Canada. Carney also stated publicly that the government intended to reduce the proportion of temporary residents to less than 5% of Canada's population by 2027 and that the Temporary Foreign Worker Program would adopt a more “focused approach” tailored to specific labour market needs.

=== Media investigations ===
On 6 April 2013, CBC News reported that Canadian IT workers at the Royal Bank of Canada (RBC) were losing their jobs to replacement foreign workers, who were brought from India by outsourcing firm iGATE. Existing RBC employees trained their replacements before they themselves were laid off, causing their appeal to the media. RBC responded to the controversy by issuing a statement denying the charges and offering clarification of the situation. While a reported 45 employees lost their jobs, the bank nevertheless had indicated that they intended to expand this practice in the coming year.

Additionally in 2013, CBC found that, in Saskatchewan, 65% of recent newly created jobs were held by temporary foreign workers, and in Nova Scotia over one thousand employers had requested foreign workers. CBC also reported that a Chinese company that owns a mine in British Columbia was attempting to import workers from China. According to the Huffington Post, one of the requirements of the job was the ability to speak Mandarin Chinese.

In October 2013, The Huffington Post reported that the Alberta Federation of Labour said foreign workers were displacing Canadian workers in Fort McMurray. The report claimed that 270 Canadian workers employed by a Toronto-based firm were to be replaced by foreign workers employed by an Italian firm. On 23 October, Global News reported that Farmers of North America, in Saskatoon, was helping farmers recruit TFWs in order to help them. The Canadian Federation of Agriculture reportedly estimated that Canada was in need of 30,000 seasonal and longer-term farm workers. Employment Canada acknowledged that there was a shortage of agricultural workers.

In December 2014, CBC reported that Microsoft Canada obtained an exemption from the federal government that will allow the company to bring in an unspecified number of TFW to British Columbia. The trainee foreign workers (most of whom would be citizens of India and China) were to be hired without requiring Microsoft to look for Canadian workers who could fill the positions.

=== Issues with the Live-in Caregiver Program ===
The exploitation of migrant labour has been a key issue amongst labour and civil society groups. Many have suggested that the structure of Canadian temporary migration programs, particularly the Live-in Caregiver Program (LCP), perpetuate social and economic inequalities in the long-term. There are little provincial employment standards regarding the recruitment and monitoring of the LCP, which leaves migrant workers vulnerable to exploitation. At present, only the province of British Columbia requires that workers be registered by their employers under the Domestic Workers' Registry. Employment agencies, on the other hand, are only regulated in two provinces, British Columbia, and Alberta, and their regulation only amounts to operating licensing requirements.

The lack of systemic regulation makes it difficult for contract violations to be contested. Under the law, contracts should specify total work hours, vacation time, wages, and benefits. However, in a study conducted by a Montreal organization, PINAY, together with the McGill University School of Social Work, it was found that in 25% of the 148 live-in caregivers studied, employers did not sign a contract at all, and 43% claimed that they weren't paid for overtime work.

Another issue with temporary migrants is the limited mobility afforded to them within the confines of their stipulated contracts. What sets the LCP apart from the TFWP is that applicants are required to have a minimum secondary school education as well as domestic service training. Research has even found that a large number of those applying through the LCP program are overqualified and have post-secondary education, and training as registered practitioners and nurses from their origin countries. However, due to the live-in requirement and the length of the LCP contract, deskilling occurs, wherein educational qualifications and training once held by immigrants prior to entering the program are not utilized or developed. This leads to downward occupational mobility as re-entry into the labour market with a skilled position becomes difficult upon the end of the contract, and once permanent residency is achieved.

=== Abuse of workers and accusations of modern slavery in Canada ===
In 2017, the Toronto Star conducted an investigation that revealed a large number of cases of incorrect accommodation, lack of access to medical care, violence and abuse.

In July 2024, a report for the United Nations Human Rights Council by the Special Rapporteur on contemporary forms of slavery described the program as a "breeding ground for contemporary slavery". The report found many instances of debt bondage, wage theft, lack of personal protective equipment, abuse, and sexual misconduct. The Minister of Immigration, Refugees, and Citizenship Marc Miller gave a statement to Reuters saying that the program was "in need of reform" and that the low-wage stream needed to be examined.

== See also ==
- Citizenship and Immigration Canada
- Immigration to Canada
- Canada immigration statistics
- Permanent resident (Canada)
