= The Bahamas–Canada relations =

- Bahamas: Canada

Diplomatic mission
- High Commission of The Bahamas, Ottawa: High Commission of Canada, Kingston

The Bahamas–Canada relations encompass the diplomatic, economic, and historical interactions between the Commonwealth of the Bahamas and Canada. Both countries established diplomatic relations upon the independence of the Bahamas on 10 July 1973. Both countries are Commonwealth realms.

Both countries share common membership of the United Nations, Caribbean Development Bank, the Commonwealth, the International Criminal Court, the Organization of American States and the World Trade Organization.

== High-level visits ==
High-level visits from Canada to the Bahamas

- Prime Minister Justin Trudeau (2016, 2023)

== Resident diplomatic missions ==
- The Canadian High Commission in Kingston, Jamaica is accredited to the Bahamas. Canada has an honorary consul in Nassau.
- The Bahamas is represented by their High Commission in Ottawa.

== See also ==
- Foreign relations of the Bahamas
- Foreign relations of Canada
