= Seasonal Agricultural Worker Program =

The Seasonal Agricultural Worker Program (French: Programme des travailleurs agricoles saisonniers, SAWP) is a Government of Canada program that was introduced by the Pearson government in 1966 between Canada and Jamaica but has since expanded to include Mexico and numerous other Caribbean countries. It is intended to allow Canadian farm employers to hire workers from Mexico and the Caribbean on temporary visas during the planting and harvesting seasons when employers are unable to hire local workers to fulfill their labour demands.

The program, administered jointly by Employment and Social Development Canada with Citizenship and Immigration Canada, is available to those who are at least 18 years of age, from one of the participating countries, qualify under the immigration laws and the sending country and agree to the employment contract. Those workers are eligible for the Canada Pension Plan and certain Employment Insurance benefits (excluding "special benefits" such as maternal, parental and compassionate care benefits). Workers are also subject to income tax laws.

== History ==
The issue of a lack of workers was first recognized in the mid-1960s when there were not enough workers to fill the needs of farms that needed their crop picked as well as planted at the beginning of the season. The government saw a need to form a program to help fill the gap of labor and farms in need of workers. By 1966 the Seasonal Agriculture Workers Program was formed and utilized by Ontario. It began as a partnership between Canada and the Caribbean country of Jamaica and has since grown to many other Caribbean countries and Mexico. As of 2005 there were 18,000 migrant workers coming into the country annually, mainly working in Ontario.

== Criticism ==
Researchers studying migrant women who enter into British Columbia, Canada through SAWP found that they face unique barriers that inhibit their bodily autonomy and freedom to make choices surrounding their sexual health through "state-level policies and practices, employer coercion and control, and circumstances related to the structure of the SAWP". These women are impacted by many factors that contribute to their marginalization, including precarious legal status, lack of access to health care services, poverty, knowledge and language barriers, and job insecurity.

Utilizing a reproductive justice framework to analyze this issue, researchers shift the focus from "abortion rights and sexual freedom" to governmental processes that inhibit access for women to be able to make choices that are "safe, affordable, and accessible". Women in SAWP are highly vulnerable due to the program's legal restrictions, which results in a limited access to social programs or services, labour rights and health care services.

As a result, migrant women in SAWP take part in "everyday" forms of resistance to injustices and oppression. Rather than large scale forms of protest or objection, tactics to resist these forms of oppression are more subtle. Forms of resistance for these women often involve private disobedience of restrictive regulations, informing the media anonymously of injustices, finding and accessing forms of birth control or reproductive health services even when discouraged from doing so, forging relationships, and building a community as well as seeking the aid of advocacy groups.

In 2022, the program has received increased media scrutiny following a string of worker deaths and an open letter from Jamaican migrant workers to the Jamaican Ministry of Labour likening conditions in Ontario to 'systematic slavery.'

== See also ==
- Temporary foreign worker program in Canada
