= List of ambassadors of the Dominican Republic to the Holy See =

Coordinates: 41.904285°N 12.457775°E

Ambassador of the Dominican Republic to the Holy See
- Embajador de la República Dominicana ante la Santa Sede
- Coat of arms of the Dominican Republic
- Incumbent es:Víctor Suárez since December 8, 2024
- Ministry of Foreign Affairs of the Dominican Republic; Embassy of the Dominican Republic to the Holy See
- Style: Mr./Madam Ambassador (informal); His/Her Excellency (formal)
- Type: Head of mission
- Reports to: Minister of Foreign Affairs of the Dominican Republic
- Seat: Embassy of the Dominican Republic to the Holy See
- Nominator: President of the Dominican Republic
- Appointer: President of the Dominican Republic; with Senate advice and consent
- Term length: At the pleasure of the president
- Inaugural holder: Collin de Paradis
- Formation: 1880; 146 years ago
- Salary: US$5,000 (monthly)
- Website: vat.mirex.gob.do

The Ambassador of the Dominican Republic to the Holy See is the Ambassador of the government in Santo Domingo to the Holy See, he is concurrently accredited as ambassador to the Governments in Athens, Nicosia and to the Order of Malta.

Diplomatic accreditation	Ambassador	Observations	List of presidents of the Dominican Republic	List of popes	Term end
1880	Collin de Paradis	In 1884, Collin de Paradis, a diplomatic agent who had worked for various Latin American nations in Europe, was appointed as special envoy by the Dominican government. De Paradis negotiated a concordat with the Vatican.	Fernando Arturo de Meriño	Pope Leo XIII	1887
1890	Justyn Faszowicz Baron von Farensbach	Justyn Faszowicz baron de Farensbach	Manuel María Gautier	Pope Leo XIII	1900
December 31, 1900	Amedeo de Astraudo	(1871-1944) S. E. il Signor Duca Amedeo de Astraudo, Inviato Straordinario e Ministro Plenipotenziarno (31 dic. 1900).	Juan Isidro Jiménez	Pope Leo XIII	1908
July 9, 1930	Eduardo Persichetti Ugolini di Castelcolbúccaro	Persichetti Ugolini di Castelcolbúccaro Márchese Eduardo, Invicto Straordinario e Ministro Plenipotenciario (Lett. Cred.: 9 lu. 1930).	Rafael Estrella Ureña	Pope Pius XI	1941
1946	Tullio Franco Franco	ambassador	Rafael Leónidas Trujillo Molina	Pope Pius XII	1947
1948	Roberto Despradel	Carlos Roberto Despradel Roques	Rafael Leónidas Trujillo Molina	Pope Pius XII	1949
1949	Pedro Troncoso Sánchez	(* April 19, 1904 in Santo Domingo;May 23, 1989 in Santo Domingo): He studied law at the Universidad Autónoma de Santo Domingo, title granted in 1927.; Author: "Philosophical Sketches (1932)," The Mission of the Judge "(1948),"; 1967 Positions of Principle in Dominican Political History ", In 1939 he became professor at the University of Santo Domingo and in 1967 at the National University.; From 1939 to 1941 he was president of the City Council of Santo Domingo.; From 1941 to 1944 he was Dominican Ambassador to Argentina.; In 1944 he was Dominican Ambassador to Mexico.; From 1949 to 1953 he was ambassador next the Holy See.; From 1956 to 1958 he was Dominican Ambassador to Italy.; From 1946 to 1949 he was president of the Supreme Court of Justice ().; From 1952 to 1956 he was president of the University of Santo Domingo.; In 1952 he was Dominican Minister of Education.; From 1954 to 1989 he was president and member of the Academy of History of the Dominican Republic.; From 1968 to 1983 he was founder and president of the Duartiano Institute and Member of the Royal Academy of the Spanish Language.; From 1974 to 1983 he was president of the Academy of Sciences (). Languages: Spanish, English, French and Italian.	Rafael Leónidas Trujillo Molina	Pope Pius XII	1952
1952	Elías Brache Hijo	Elias Brache hijo, desde de 1930 hasta agosto del mismo año, Rafael Estrella Ureña, desde agosto de 1930 hasta agosto de 1931. Elias Brache hijo, septiembre, — interino — . Max. Henríquez Ureña, desde agosto de 1931 hasta agosto de, Elias Brache, representative of the Liberal party, arrived in Washington a few days after the other representatives had	Héctor B. Trujillo	Pope Pius XII	1953
1953	Atilano Vicini	Chargé d'affaires	Héctor B. Trujillo	Pope Pius XII	1953
1954	Nicolás Vega		Héctor B. Trujillo	Pope Pius XII	1955
1956	Tulio Franco Franco		Héctor B. Trujillo	Pope Pius XII	1960
1960	Luis Francisco Thomén Candelario		Joaquín Balaguer	Pope John XXIII	1961
1961	Porfirio Herrera Baez		Joaquín Balaguer	Pope John XXIII	1962
1962	Manuel Ulises Bonnelly Fondeur		Rafael Filiberto Bonnelly	Pope John XXIII	1965
1965	Atilano Vicini	Héctor Atilano Vicini Perdomo (1887 )	Héctor García Godoy	Pope Paul VI	1966
1966	Tulio Franco y Franco	(*1893 in Santiago de los Caballeros;1978)Minister to Haiti, since 1944. Delegate, Chapultepec Conference, Mexico, 1945, Lnited Nations Conference, San Francisco. 1945: alternate representative, United Nations Assembly. 1947.; married; has three children.	Joaquín Balaguer	Pope Paul VI	1970
1970	Alvaro Logroño Battle		Joaquín Balaguer	Pope Paul VI	1976
1976	Juan María Contín		Joaquín Balaguer	Pope Paul VI	1980
1980	Miguel Antonio Olavarrieta Pérez		Antonio Guzmán Fernández	Pope John Paul II	1981
1981	Carlos Máximo Dobal Márquez	(*13. April 1926 in Havanna 25. Juli 2011)	Antonio Guzmán Fernández	Pope John Paul II	1982
1982	Amado Amable Nadal Gómez	Chargé d'affaires	Salvador Jorge Blanco	Pope John Paul II	1983
December 1, 1982	Víctor Gómez Bergés		Salvador Jorge Blanco	Pope John Paul II	May 1, 1985
October 21, 1985	Antonio Zaglul Elmudesi	(*2. April 1920;1996)	Salvador Jorge Blanco	Pope John Paul II	1986
1987	Efrain Reyes Duluc		Salvador Jorge Blanco	Pope John Paul II	1990
1990	Ramón Arturo Cáceres Rodríguez		Salvador Jorge Blanco	Pope John Paul II	1997
1997	César Iván Feris Iglesias	Arq. César Iván Feris Iglesias, Director del Museo de Las Casas Reales Mayo- Agosto 1980	Leonel Fernández	Pope John Paul II	2000
December 11, 2000	Victor A. Hidalgo Justo		Hipólito Mejía	Pope John Paul II	2003
2003	Carlos Rafael Conrado Marion-Landais Castillo		Hipólito Mejía	Pope John Paul II	2009
2009	Víctor Manuel Grimaldi Céspedes		Leonel Fernández	Pope Benedict XVI	
