= Pact for Democracy =

In Dominican Republic, the Pact for Democracy was the agreement reached by José Francisco Peña Gómez and Joaquín Balaguer after the change in the electoral results of the 1994 elections in which Peña Gómez was the winner and Joaquín Balaguer altered the results declaring himself winner of the elections.

In the 1994 elections, the leader of the Social Christian Reformist Party (PRSC) Joaquín Balaguer remained in power, although on this occasion his mandate was reduced to two years. Balaguer proposed the signing of a Pact for Democracy in which he proposed reducing his mandate to two years and then deliver it to his closest competitor. That proposal was rejected by the PRD candidate. Given this situation, Balaguer agreed to reduce his period to 18 months and gave way to the holding of presidential elections on November 16, 1995.

However, by means of a document transference, a "Pact for Democracy" was signed, different from that agreed by the two leaders. Balaguer also had been in conversations with the PLD.

The agreement finally signed at the National Palace on August 10, 1994, established, among other aspects, the convening of the National Assembly in order to reform the Constitution to establish a new presidential election date, on May 16, 1996, and not in November 1995 as agreed, which separated them from the municipal and congressional elections, which would be in May 1998; prohibit re-election in two consecutive periods, and establish the second round if no candidate obtained more than 50 percent of the votes, as well as reforms to the judicial system.
