= Salvatore Siino =

Italian nuncio (1904–1963)

Salvatore Siino (5 October 1904 – 8 October 1963) was an Italian prelate of the Catholic Church who worked in the diplomatic service of the Holy See. He became an archbishop in 1953 and served as Apostolic Nuncio in the Dominican Republic and the Philippines.

== Biography ==
Salvatore Siino was born on 5 October 1904 in Capaci, Italy. He completed his ecclesiastical studies at the seminaries of Monreale and Palermo. He was ordained a priest of the Archdiocese of Monreale on 5 April 1930. His graduate studies were finished at the Pontifical Institute for Ecclesiastical and Civil law in Rome.

Having entered the diplomatic service of the Holy See he was assigned to the Apostolic Nunciatures of Bolivia, Chile and Ecuador. While in Chile he combined his diplomatic duties with those of a professor at the Catholic University of Santiago. In Quito (Ecuador) he taught both at the National University and at the Theological College of the Salesian Fathers. The Catholic University of Santiago de Chile conferred upon him the Doctorate "Honoris Causa" and made him a Fellow of its Literary and Philosophical Academy. In 1950 he was promoted to the rank of "Consigliere di Nunziatura", and in 1951 was appointed Domestic Prelate of His Holiness. From 1951 till 1953 he worked at Rome in the Second Section of the Secretariat of State under Giovanni Battista Montini (future Pope Paul VI) and was "entrusted with important and delicate duties", as Paul VI described.

On 27 October 1953, Pope Pius XII appointed him titular archbishop of Perge and Apostolic Nuncio to the Dominican Republic. He received his episcopal consecration on 29 November 1953 from Cardinal Clemente Micara. He aligned himself with the authoritarian regime there, becoming "one of Trujillo's most active flatterers and effusive supporters". On 14 March 1959, Pope John XXIII named him Apostolic Nuncio to the Philippines. His reassignment, signaled a shift in the church's politics in Latin America.

During his term, he facilitated in the erection of 6 dioceses (Borongan, Laoag, Imus, Malolos, Tarlac, and Cabanatuan), the ecclesiastical province of Lingayen-Dagupan, 3 territorial prelatures (Marbel, Tagum, and San Jose de Antique), and the appointment of 11 bishops and one apostolic administrator.

He had also helped with the establishment and of the Pontificio Colegio Filippino at Rome (7 Oct 1961). Erected 10 new minor seminaries and the major regional seminary in Davao. He had also visited all the existing seminaries in the country while providing for their renovations and enlargements.

With his help, three new Catholic universities were created: Ateneo de Manila University, University of Negros Occidental-Recoletos, and Saint Louis University in Baguio.

In the field of Apostolate the Philippines have from him the organization of the Apostolatus Maris and of the Apostolatus Aeris, as well as a fruitful constant attention to the right functioning and strengthening of the Catholic Action and of the Social Catholic Action. On 1959 the "Pius XII Institute of Catechetical and Social Studies" was established in Jaro; and in Manila the "Asian Social Institute" in 1962.

He died in Rome of a heart attack on 8 October 1963 at the age of 59 while waiting with a group of diplomats for a meeting with Pope Paul VI.

His funeral rites were held at Rome on 11 October 1963, were officiated by Cardinal Amleto Cicognani, Secretary of State. The Pontificio Collegio-Seminario Filipino provided the altar and choir services. Present were Cardinal Joseph Pizardo, Cardinal Rufino Santos, and Cardinal Efrem Forni; the prelates from the Secretariat of State led by Antonio Samorè, Angelo Dell'Acqua and Ernesto Camagni; the prelates from the "Ante-Camera Pontificia" presided over by Giovanni Nasalli Rocca di Corneliano; all the apostolic nuncios, internuncios and delegates in service headed by Antonio Riberi and Lino Zanini; the Ambassador of the Philippines to the Holy See, Benigno Toda y Toledo, as well as Ambassador of the Republic of Santo Domingo, with the personnel of their embassies. Prominent among them at the Church of Santa Maria in Transpontina were the relatives of Siino.
