= Carlos Morales Troncoso =

Dominican Republic politician (1940–2014)

His Excellency Carlos Morales Troncoso
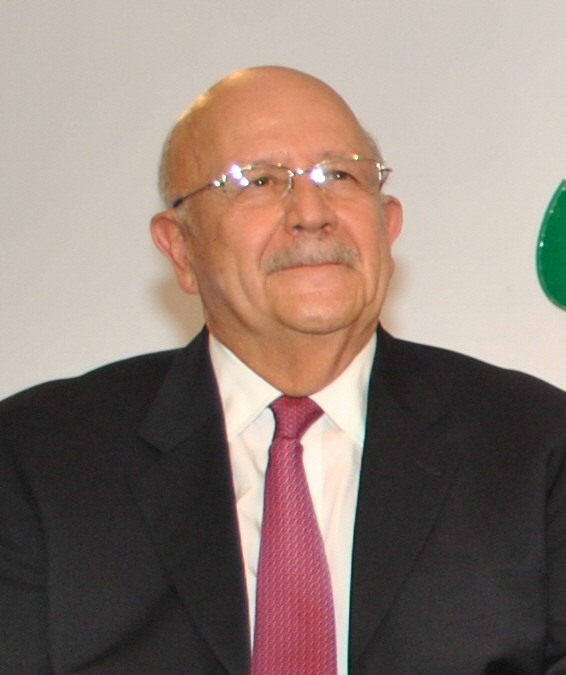

34th Vice President of the Dominican Republic
- In office 16 August 1986 – 16 August 1994
- President: Joaquín Balaguer
- Preceded by: Manuel Fernández Mármol
- Succeeded by: Jacinto Peynado Garrigosa

Minister of Foreign Relations of the Dominican Republic
- In office 16 August 2004 – 15 September 2014
- President: Leonel Fernández Danilo Medina
- Preceded by: Frank Guerrero Prats
- Succeeded by: Andrés Navarro
- In office 16 August 1994 – 5 May 1996
- President: Joaquín Balaguer
- Preceded by: Juan A. Taveras Guzmán
- Succeeded by: Caonabo Javier Castillo

Dominican Republic Ambassador to the United States
- In office 1989–1990
- President: Joaquín Balaguer

Personal details
- Born: 29 September 1940 Santo Domingo, Dominican Republic
- Died: 25 October 2014 (aged 74) Houston, Texas, U.S.
- Party: Social Christian Reformist Party
- Education: Louisiana State University

Carlos Morales Troncoso (29 September 1940 – 25 October 2014) was a Dominican chemical engineer, businessman, and politician. Before entering public life, Morales Troncoso built a distinguished career as an executive in the sugar industry, rising to lead major corporations and contributing to the economic development of the eastern region of the Dominican Republic. He later transitioned into public service, serving as Vice President of the Dominican Republic from 1986 to 1994, Minister of Foreign Affairs from 1994 to 1996 and again from 2004 to 2014, and Ambassador to the United States from 1989 to 1990. He was also a prominent leader in the Social Christian Reformist Party (PRSC), serving as its president from 2009 to 2014.

== Family background ==
Carlos Morales Troncoso was born in Santo Domingo, Dominican Republic, to Eduardo Morales Avelino and Altagracia Troncoso Sánchez. He came from a prominent political and intellectual family with deep ties to Dominican history and governance. His maternal grandfather, Manuel de Jesús Troncoso de la Concha, was a distinguished jurist, writer, historian, and Supreme Court judge who served as the figurehead president of the Dominican Republic from 1940 to 1942 during the dictatorship of Rafael Trujillo.

The family's longstanding involvement in public service extended to economic institutions; Morales Troncoso himself later served on the Monetary Board of the Central Bank of the Dominican Republic (Junta Monetaria), underscoring his ties to the nation's financial policymaking.

Ancestors of Carlos Morales Troncoso

4. Pedro Enrique Morales Fernández
2. Eduardo Morales Avelino
5. Edith Avelino
1. Carlos Alfredo Miguel Morales Troncoso (1940–2014)
12. Jesús María Uladislao Troncoso (1855–1923)
25. María Antonia Troncoso Guillén (1822–1916)
6. Manuel de Jesús Ulpiano Troncoso de la Concha (1878–1955)
26. Félix Wenceslao de la Concha Petreño (1811–?)
13. Baldomera de la Concha Silva (1844–1923)
27. Leocadia Silva Troncoso
3. Altagracia Troncoso Sánchez
28. Martín Mota
14. Pedro Tomás Sánchez Mota (1848–1891)
29. María de la Paz Sánchez Salazar (1816–?)
7. Silvia Alicia Sánchez Abréu (1883–1969)
30. Félix Abréu Vieira
15. Isabel Abréu García (ca. 1855–1930)
31. Celedonia García de Peña (†1862)

== Business career ==
=== South Puerto Rico Sugar Company (1962-1967) ===
Morales Troncoso began his career working as an assistant plantation engineer at Central Romana Corporation, owned by South Puerto Rico Sugar Company. In 1967, The South Puerto Rico Sugar Company was acquired by Gulf and Western Industries becoming part of its Gulf and Western Americas Corporation division.

=== Gulf and Western Industries (1967-1984) ===
By the age of 32, he became the head of Gulf and Western Americas Corporation and served as Vice Chairman of the Board of Directors from 1970 to 1976. In 1976, he was promoted to chairman and CEO of Gulf and Western Americas Corporation, a position he held until 1984. In 1982, the operation achieved the largest sugarcane harvest by a single sugar mill worldwide, exceeding 480,000 tons and establishing it as one of the largest and most efficient mills in the world. He also served on the board of directors of the Okeelanta Sugar Company until 1986.

=== Central Romana Corporation (1984–1986) ===
After the death of Gulf and Western Industries founder Charles Bluhdorn in 1983, his successor Martin Davis initiated a restructuring of the company, which included the divestiture of non-core assets. As part of this, in 1984, Gulf and Western Industries sold its sugar holdings in Florida and the Dominican Republic to a group of investors including Carlos Morales Troncoso and the Fanjul brothers. The Dominican operations were rebranded as Central Romana Corporation, with Morales Troncoso serving as its president. During his tenure, Central Romana evolved into one of the world's most efficient sugar producers. Central Romana Corporation diversified beyond sugar into areas such as chemicals, free zones, livestock, meat and dairy production, construction materials, iron, airport and port operations, real estate and hotels.

=== CBI Sugar Group ===
Morales Troncoso was a co-founder and eventual president of the Group of Sugar Producing Countries of the Caribbean (CBI Sugar Group). He promoted the establishment of the Dominican Sugar Institute (Instituto Azucarero Dominicano). As president and treasurer of the Fundación Gulf & Western Dominicana, he advanced tourism, as well as industrial, economic, and social development in the country, particularly in the east.

His business acumen earned him recognition, including being named "Businessman of the Year" in 1982 by the Asociación Interamericana de Hombres de Empresa and receiving the Free Enterprise Award for Best Cluster Company from Gulf and Western Industries that same year.

== Political career ==
Morales Troncoso transitioned from business to politics, drawing on his family's legacy and his own experience on the Monetary Board of the Central Bank of the Dominican Republic, where he served prior to 1986, advising on economic policy. He entered politics when President Joaquín Balaguer invited him to be his vice-presidential running mate in 1986.

=== Vice President (1986-1994) ===
On May 16, 1986, he was elected Vice President of the Dominican Republic as a candidate of the Social Christian Reformist Party (PRSC), serving under President Joaquín Balaguer until 1990. He was re-elected in 1990, holding the position until August 16, 1994. In this role, he focused on economic stability and infrastructure development. He also served as executive director of the State Sugar Council (Consejo Estatal del Azúcar) until 1989, overseeing the sugar industry's national operations and reforms. During his time as vice president, from 1989 to 1990, he was appointed Extraordinary and Plenipotentiary Ambassador to the United States in Washington, D.C., succeeding Eduardo A. León.

=== Minister of Foreign Affairs (1994-1996 & 2004-2014) ===
Appointed by President Balaguer on August 16, 1994, he served his first term as Minister of Foreign Affairs until May 1996, emphasizing regional integration and international relations. During this period, he served as the President of the Council of Ministers of the Caribbean Forum of African, Caribbean and Pacific States (CARIFORUM), which facilitates economic partnership agreements with the European Union. Following his initial term, Morales Troncoso returned to the Foreign Ministry a decade later serving under President Leonel Fernández on August 16, 2004, and continuing under President Danilo Medina until September 15, 2014, this decade-long tenure was marked by significant diplomatic expansions. He oversaw the opening of numerous embassies and consulates worldwide, enhancing the Dominican Republic's global presence. Morales Troncoso was a key advocate for the Central American Integration System (SICA), serving as a member of its Council of Ministers and promoting peace, democracy, and economic cooperation in Latin America and the Caribbean. His efforts elevated the Dominican Republic's voice in international forums, fostering alliances and respect for its sovereignty.

=== Social Christian Reformist Party (2009-2014) ===
He became president of the Social Christian Reformist Party on 10 August 2009, succeeding Quique Antún following Joaquín Balaguer's death. Under his leadership until 26 January 2014, the party underwent renewal and formed successful alliances, such as with the Dominican Liberation Party (PLD), contributing to electoral victories.

== Personal life ==
Morales Troncoso married Luisa Alba in the early 1960s, and they had four daughters. He was a devout Catholic, and his faith influenced his public service philosophy. He died on 25 October 2014, in Houston, Texas, from leukemia at the age of 74. His passing was mourned nationally and internationally, with condolences from figures like OAS Secretary General José Miguel Insulza, who praised his contributions to diplomacy and business.

In 2016, the Dominican Congress passed a law naming the bridge over the Chavón River - part of the Autopista del Coral connecting La Romana and La Altagracia provinces - after him, recognizing his role in regional development.

== Honours ==
- Dominican Republic:
  - Order of Merit of Duarte, Sánchez and Mella.
  - Order of Christopher Columbus .
- Spain:
  - Order of Charles III .
- Peru:
  - Order of the Sun of Peru.
- Panama:
  - Order of Vasco Núñez de Balboa.
- Chile:
  - Order of Merit (Chile).
- Malta:
  - Sovereign Military Order of Malta.

== Awards ==
Morales Troncoso received numerous honors for his business and political achievements:

- Doctor Honoris Causa in Humanities, Technological University of Santiago (UTESA) (1979)
- Distinguished Graduate in the Business World, Louisiana State University (1981)
- Businessman of the Year, Asociación Interamericana de Hombres de Empresa (1982)
- Man of the Year, Dominican Chamber of Commerce of New York (1982)
- Free Enterprise Award – Best Cluster Company, Gulf & Western Industries, Inc. (1982)
- Doctor Honoris Causa of Humanities, Chicago State University (1987)
- Julián Barceló Award as Sports Promoter, Asociación de Cronistas Deportivos & Barceló & Cia. (1989)
- Most Distinguished Graduate of the Year, Louisiana State University (1992)

== Books ==
Troncoso wrote several books, including "De lo Privado a lo Público" about his work in the public and private sectors.

Political offices
Preceded by Manuel Fernández Mármol	Vice President of the Dominican Republic; 16 August 1986 – 16 August 1994	Succeeded by Jacinto Peynado y Garrigosa
Preceded by Juan A. Taveras Guzmán	Minister of Foreign Relations; 16 August 1994 – 5 May 1996	Succeeded by Caonabo Javier Castillo
Preceded by Frank Guerrero Prats	Minister of Foreign Relations; 16 August 2004 – 15 September 2014	Succeeded by Andrés Navarro
Party political offices
Preceded by Federico Antún Batlle	President of the Social Christian Reformist Party; 9 August 2009 – 26 January 2014	Succeeded by Federico Antún Batlle
