= Andrés Navarro =

Dominican politician (born 1964)

Andrés Navarro García
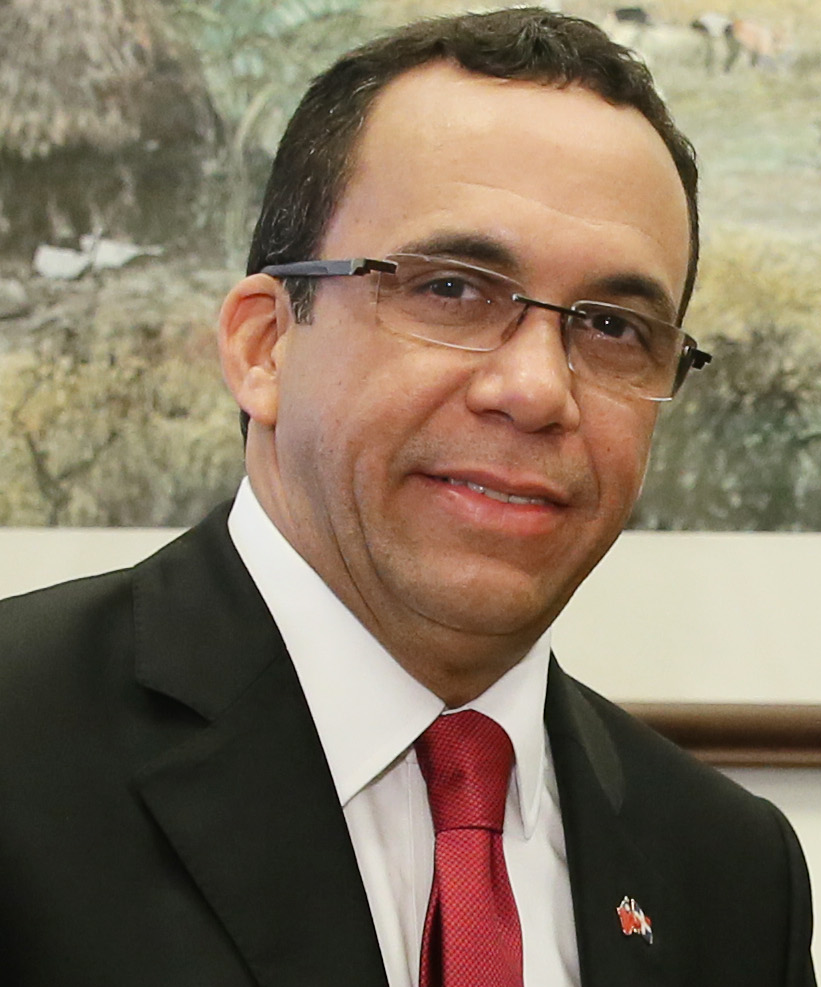

Minister of Foreign Affairs of the Dominican Republic
- In office 15 September 2014 – 16 August 2016
- President: Danilo Medina
- Preceded by: Carlos Morales Troncoso
- Succeeded by: Miguel Vargas

Chief of Cabinet of the Ministry of Public Works
- In office 22 April 2014 – 15 September 2014 Serving with Gonzalo Castillo (Minister)

Personal details
- Born: 4 February 1964 (age 62) Bonao, Dominican Republic
- Party: Dominican Liberation’s Party
- Education: Universidad Autónoma de Santo Domingo, Universidad Nacional Autónoma de México
- Occupation: Bureaucrat
- Profession: Architect, urban planner
- Website: https://andresnavarro.do/

Andrés Navarro García (born 4 February 1964) is an architect, writer, professor and politician of the Dominican Republic. From 15 September 2014 to 16 August 2016 he was the Minister of Foreign Affairs of the Dominican Republic.

== Political career ==
Andrés Navarro has served as:

- Director de Política Nacional de Desarrollo Urbano, CONAU (Actual DGODT) – 1998
- Director General de Planeamiento Urbano, Ayuntamiento Distrito Nacional – 2002.
- Director Adjunto del Programa de Apoyo a la Reforma y Modernización del Estado – PARME – 2005 - 2008.
- Secretario Técnico del Ayuntamiento del Distrito Nacional – 2008 - 2012.
- Secretario General del Ayuntamiento del Distrito Nacional – 2012 - 2014.

Fue Director de Gabinete del Ministerio de Obras Públicas desde abril hasta septiembre del 2014 cuando fue nombrado mediante el decreto presidencial 332-14 Ministro de Relaciones Exteriores de la República Dominicana.
