= Roberto Álvarez (diplomat) =

Dominican lawyer and diplomat (born 1944)

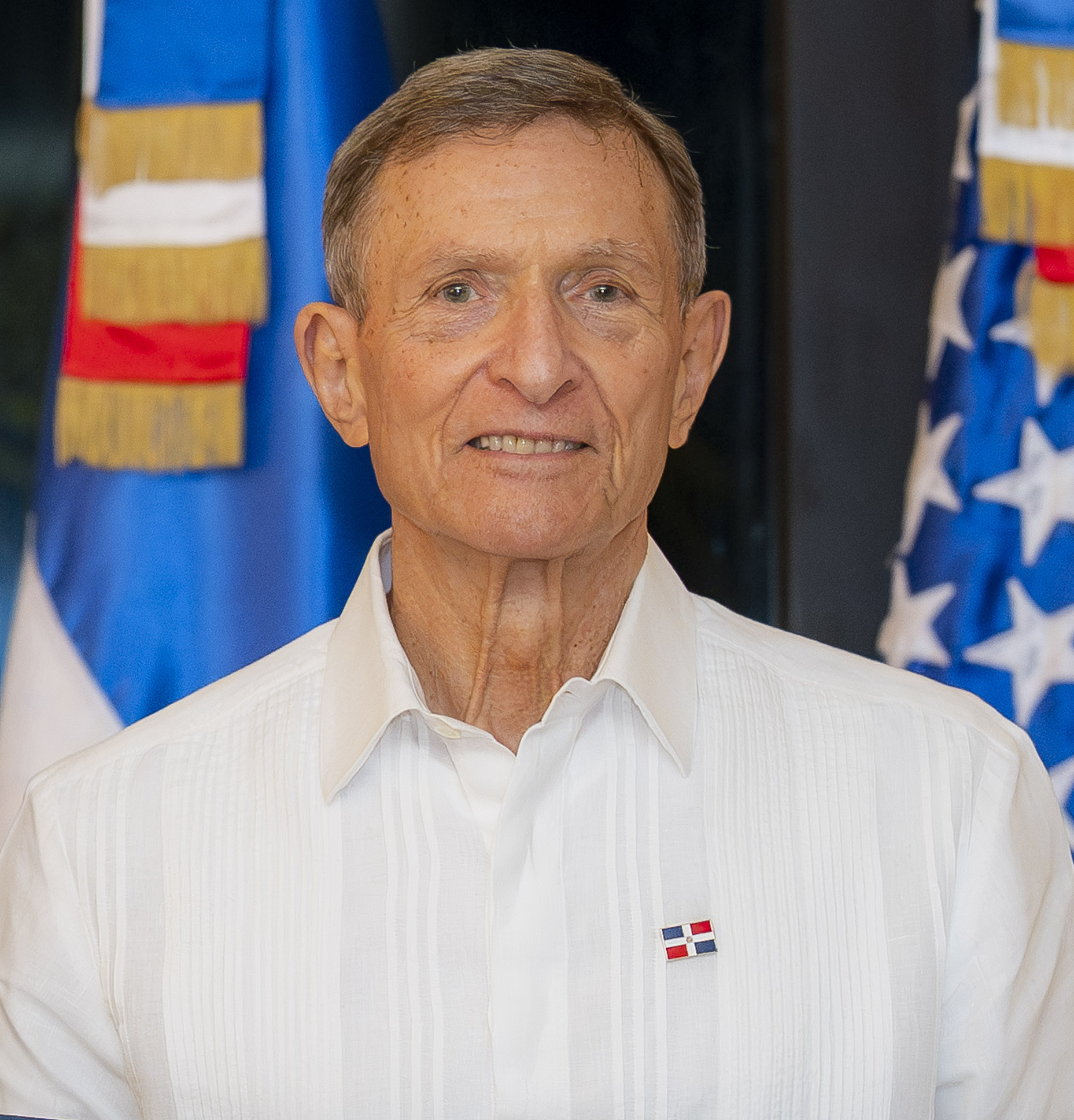
- Álvarez in 2025

Ambassador Emeritus of the Dominican Republic
- Incumbent
- Assumed office 16 August 2026
- President: Luis Abinader

Minister of Foreign Affairs of the Dominican Republic
- In office 16 August 2020 – 16 August 2026
- President: Luis Abinader
- Preceded by: Miguel Vargas
- Succeeded by: Víctor "Ito" Bisonó

Ambassador and Permanent Representative of the Dominican Republic to the Organization of American States
- In office 22 June 2005 – 24 September 2008
- President: Leonel Fernández
- Preceded by: Mayerlyn Cordero Díaz
- Succeeded by: Héctor Virgilio Alcántara Mejía

Personal details
- Born: Roberto Teodoro Álvarez Gil; 7 June 1944 (age 82) Santo Domingo, Dominican Republic
- Party: Modern Revolutionary Party
- Parents: Ramon Ambrosio Álvarez Aybar (father); Eridania Gil Mañaná (mother)
- Relatives: Gustavo Augusto Álvarez Gil (brother); Ana Patricia Álvarez Gil (sister)
- Education: Universidad Autónoma de Santo Domingo (LL.D.); Johns Hopkins University; Georgetown University
- Occupation: Diplomat; politician
- Profession: Lawyer

Roberto Teodoro Álvarez Gil (born June 7, 1944) is a Dominican lawyer and diplomat. He is also a researcher and author of publications on human rights and international relations. In 2005, he was Permanent Representative of the Dominican Republic to the Organization of American States. And former Minister of Foreign Affairs of the Dominican Republic.

== Biography ==
Álvarez graduated with a doctorate in Law from the Universidad Autónoma de Santo Domingo and earned a Master's in International Relations from Johns Hopkins University and Comparative Law from Georgetown University. In 1979, he visited Argentina as part of the Inter-American Commission on Human Rights, an organization that investigated the Trujillo regime in 1976.

=== Career ===
On June 22, 2005, he presented his credentials as ambassador of the Dominican Republic to the Organization of American States and on July 1 he assumed the presidency of the Permanent Council, remaining in the position until September. On September 24, 2008, he left his position.

Later, he served as honorary ambassador of the Advisory Commission of the Secretary of State for Foreign Relations between December 2008 and August 2010, as well as being a consultant to the Inter-American Development Bank and official delegate of Amnesty International in Nicaragua and Sri Lanka. He has also been coordinator of Citizen Participation, Dominican chapter of Transparency International.

In 2018, he proposed an official truth commission about the government of Rafael Leónidas Trujillo.

=== Minister of Foreign Relations ===
On July 10, 2020, President Luis Abinader announced that Álvarez would be the Chancellor of the Dominican Republic. Álvarez has emphasized protection and rapprochement with Dominicans abroad, as well as strengthening their ties with the United States. In coherence with this interest in strengthening these relations with the strategic ally of the north, Secretary of State Mike Pompeo was one of the international personalities to attend the inauguration of President Luis Abinader, on August 16, 2020.

In the first months of his administration he had to clarify the contractual relationship of his nephew Marcelo Guzmán Álvarez's company with the Ministry of Foreign Affairs. In a statement he established that his close friend had been a service provider since the previous administration and that during his administration this contract had been terminated.

In the first three months of his administration, he has initiated a rapprochement with the neighboring country of Haiti with clear signs that the new Dominican foreign policy attempts to relaunch the relations of the two countries that occupy the same island. Roberto and his Haitian counterpart have exchanged visits.
