= Federico Antún Batlle =

Dominican politician

Personal details
- Born: 23 July 1952 (age 73) San Pedro de Macorís, Dominican Republic
- Party: Social Christian Reformist Party
- Spouse: Liliana Milagros Hernández Muñoz
- Relations: Clarissa de la Rocha (second-cousin); Amelia Vega (third-cousin); Manuel Díez Cabral (third-cousin); Nuryn Sanlley (fourth-cousin); Ulises Espaillat (great-great-great-grandfather)
- Children: 3
- Parent(s): Federico Antún Abud, Altagracia Mercedes Batlle Ginebra
- Profession: Dominican politician, civil engineer
- Ethnicity: White Dominican
- Net worth: DOP$ 39.5 million (USD$ 1 million)
- Website: twitter.com/QuiqueAntun

Federico Augusto Antún Batlle (b. San Pedro de Macorís, 23 July 1952), nicknamed Quique Antún, is a Dominican politician and civil engineer. Antún is the chairman of the third largest political party in his country, the Social Christian Reformist Party.

== Family background and first years ==
Federico Antún Batlle was born in San Pedro de Macorís on 23 July 1952 to Altagracia Mercedes Batlle Ginebra and Federico Antún Abud.

Antún Batlle descends through his mother from the colonial aristocratic families of De la Rocha, De Coca, Landeche and Bastidas, baronets of the majorat of Dávila and the majorat of Bastidas; his great-great-grandfather, Julián de la Rocha y Cubelge, was cousin of Mercedes de la Rocha, who founded Hato Mayor del Rey in 1888. Antún is also descended from the English King, William the Conqueror, and the Castilian King Alfonso X.

His paternal grandparents were Lebanese immigrants.

Ancestors of Federico Antún Batlle

4. Frank Antún (*Lebanon–†1934)
2. Federico Antún Abud (*San Pedro de Macorís, circa 1910–†circa 2000)
5. María Abud (*Lebanon–†1964)
1. Federico Augusto Antún Batlle (*San Pedro de Macorís, 1952)
24. José Batlle Filbá (*Mataró, Catalonia, Spain, 1844–†1899)
12. Jaime José Batlle Espaillat (*Santiago de los Caballeros, 1873–†1923)
25. María Dolores Espaillat Espaillat; Daughter of Ulises Francisco Espaillat Velilla
6. Augusto Batlle Vega (*Puerto Plata)
26. José Rafael Vega Pichardo (*Santiago de Cuba, Cuba, 1844–†Santiago de los Caballeros, 1897)
13. Tomasina de la Caridad Vega Llenas (*Santiago de los Caballeros, 1880–†1964)
27. María Amalia Llenas Díaz (*Santiago de los Caballeros, 1847–†ibidem, 1920)
3. Altagracia Mercedes Batlle Ginebra (*Puerto Plata, ?)
28. José Francisco Ginebra Pou (*Santo Domingo, 1838–†Puerto Plata, 1918)
14. José Emilio Ginebra Pelegrín (*Puerto Plata, 1878–†1944)
29. Adelaida Pelegrín Thompson (*Puerto Plata, 1847–†ibidem, 1933)
7. Enma Ginebra de la Rocha
30. Julián de la Rocha y Cubelge
15. María Marina de la Rocha Carmona (*1879–†?)
31. María del Carmen Carmona y Negrete (*1855–†1921)

Source: Instituto Dominicano de Genealogía

== Politics ==
From 2005 to 2009, he was the chairman of the Social Christian Reformist Party. On 26 January 2014 he was elected chairman again. On 22 February 2015, he was elected as his party nominee to the 2016 presidential election.

== Personal life ==
He is married to Liliana Milagros Hernández Muñoz and has begotten 3 children: Federico (b. 1978), Frank Augusto (b. 1982), and Jaime Augusto (b. 1984). In 2012, Antún Batlle reported in his affidavit that his net worth is of almost RD$ 40 million.

Political offices
Preceded by Amable Aristy (2008)	Social Christian Reformist Party candidate for President of the Dominican Republic; 2016	Succeeded by incumbent
Party political offices
Preceded by Rafael Bello Andino	President of the Social Christian Reformist Party; 22 July 2004 – 9 August 2009	Succeeded by Carlos Morales Troncoso
Preceded by Carlos Morales Troncoso	President of the Social Christian Reformist Party; 26 January 2014 – present	Succeeded by incumbent
