= Miguel Vargas (politician) =

Dominican politician (born 1950)

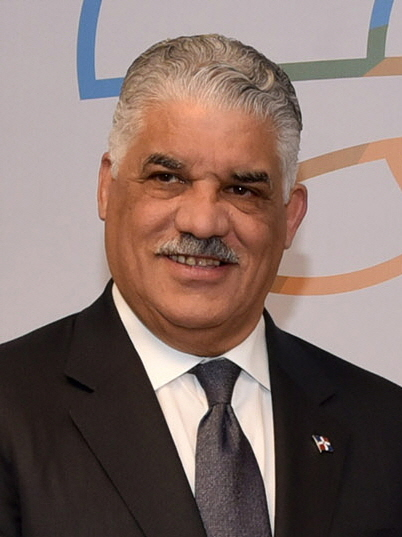

Minister of Foreign Affairs of the Dominican Republic
- In office 16 August 2016 – 16 August 2020
- President: Danilo Medina
- Preceded by: Andrés Navarro
- Succeeded by: Roberto Álvarez

Minister of Public Works and Communications of the Dominican Republic
- In office 16 August 2000 – 16 August 2004
- President: Hipólito Mejía
- Preceded by: Diandino A. Peña Crique
- Succeeded by: Manuel de Js. Pérez Gómez

Personal details
- Born: Miguel Octavio Vargas Maldonado; 26 September 1950 (age 76) Santo Domingo, Dominican Republic
- Party: Dominican Revolutionary Party
- Spouse: María Ángeles García
- Children: Alberto Manuel, Alan Omar, Miguel Paúl
- Parent(s): Altagracia Maldonado; Pedro A. Rivera
- Education: University of Puerto Rico (BEng)
- Occupation: Civil engineer, businessman, politician

Miguel Octavio Vargas Maldonado (born 26 September 1950) is a Dominican civil engineer, businessman, and politician. He is the current president of the Dominican Revolutionary Party, and former Minister of Foreign Affairs of the Dominican Republic.

== Biography ==
Miguel Vargas is the extra marital son of Altagracia Maldonado and Pedro Antonio Rivera Abreu, an agro-industrial businessman and politician. Vargas is named after the husband of his mother, Octavio Vargas. Vargas studied at the Colegio San Juan Bosco, where obtained his high school diploma. Afterwards, he pursued a Bachelor's of Science in Civil Engineering from the University of Puerto Rico.

Upon graduation, Vargas began his professional life as a supervising engineer in the engineering department and buildings of the Compañía Dominicana de Teléfonos (CODETEL). Years later, he founded Planinco, his first engineering firm.

Vargas received a substantial inheritance from his biological father, who was serving as senator for La Vega Province when he died in a car accident in 1994.

Vargas is currently married to María de los Ángeles García Frangie, and has three children: Alberto Manuel, Alan Omar, and Miguel Paúl.

== Political life ==
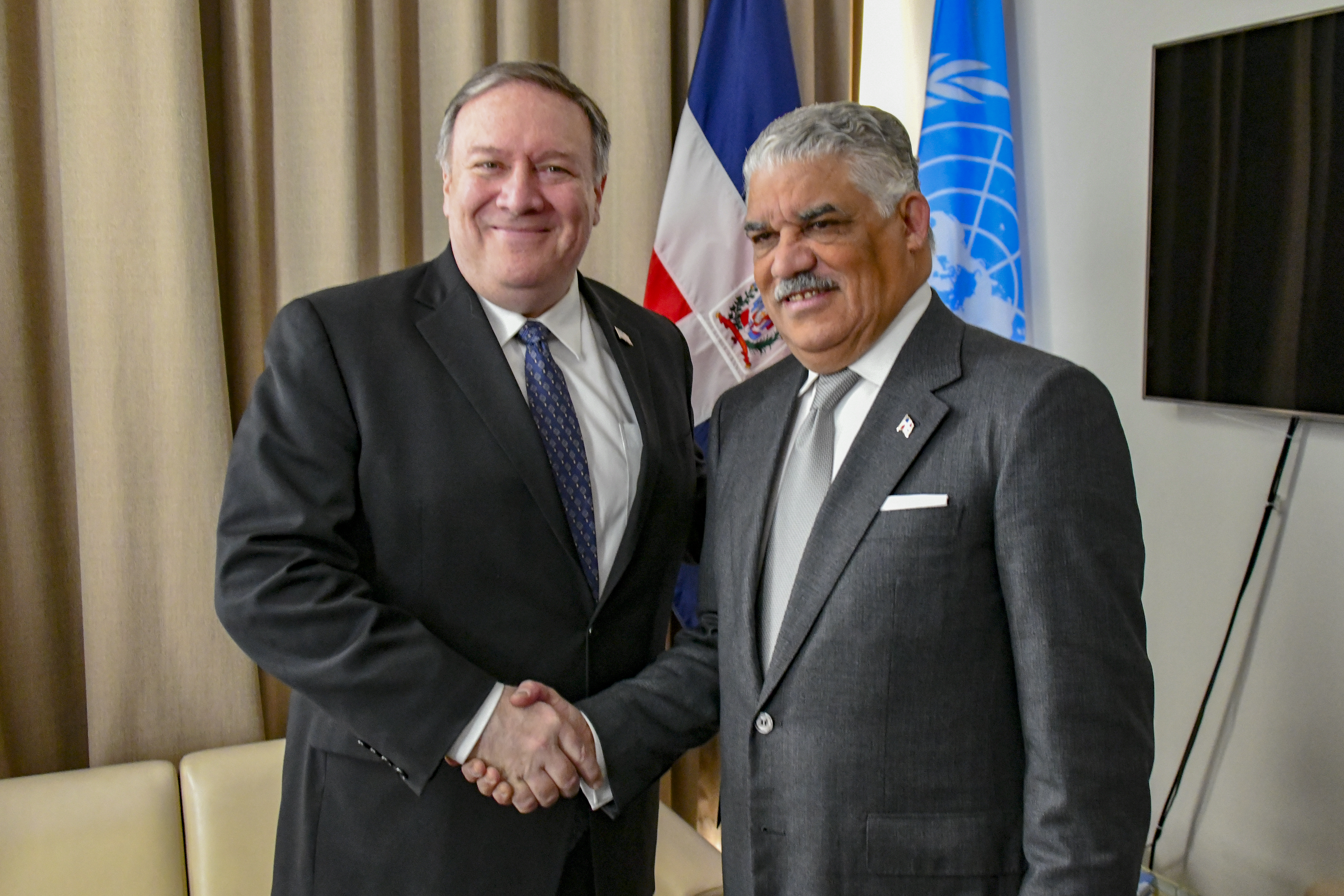
Vargas meets with U.S. Secretary of State Mike Pompeo in New York City on January 26, 2019

Miguel Vargas Maldonado began his political career in the mid-1970s, the Dominican Revolutionary Party (PRD), which has fought for nearly forty years. In the party leadership he has held the roles of Vice President, member of the Presidium, a member of the National Executive Committee (CEN) and the Political Commission and National Secretary of Finance.

Between 1982 and 1984, in the government of Salvador Jorge Blanco (PRD 1982–1986), he was director general of the "Water Supply and Sewerage Corporation of Santo Domingo CAASD". In the government of Hipolito Mejia (2000–2004), it was "Secretary of State for Public Works and Communications".

He was appointed as Chancellor of the Dominican Republic President Danilo Medina by 16 August 2016.

=== Primary Dominican Revolutionary Party (2007) ===
On 28 January 2007, Vargas Maldonado beat his opponent Milagros Ortiz Bosch, with about 80% of the votes, thus becoming the official candidate of the PRD to the Presidency of the Republic for the elections of 16 May 2008.

=== Campaign proposals as a presidential candidate election 2008 ===
Vargas Maldonado said that, if elected president in 2008, would cut taxes in order to boost the economy. Grant 50% of charges of public administration to women, and increase spending on social investment. His election campaign was based on his proposals to deal with pressing problems of the Dominican people as unemployment, crime, homelessness and high tax rates, as well as criticism of the government administration of President Leonel Fernandez Reyna (2004–2008 ).

=== Election Results 2008 ===
In the elections of 16 May 2008, voting for the PRD candidate with Vargas as obtained rose 33% in 2004 to 41% in 2008. However, he won by the PLD candidate and candidate for reelection, Dr. Leonel Fernandez, with over 53% of the vote.

=== PRD President ===
On Sunday 7 June 2009 Miguel Vargas was elected by the Political Commission of the PRD as party president. The election was decided by 244 votes in favor. Perredeísta membership of that body at that time was 312 people.

=== Election Results 2010 ===
Chaired by Miguel Vargas, the PRD attended the congressional and municipal elections on 16 May 2010. Although the result in terms of votes absolutes improved from the last election, no seat was achieved in the Senate . However, enrollment of deputies and mayors increased, which was considered a breakthrough by the PRD.

=== PRD Convention 2011 ===
On 6 March 2011 was held a convention where Vargas competed against former president of the Dominican Republic Hipolito Mejia, the official candidacy for president. In a closed dispute, the convention Mejia won with 53.30% against a 46.70%. The loser pre-candidate Vargas, claimed that some records in his favor were not counted, and other members of opposing parties, as the PLD and PRSC, could vote at this convention not having been excluded from the list of voters.

In his sworn statement of assets 2011 to run for the presidential candidate for the PRD declared a heritage of more than 100 million pesos. In January 2014 was the subject of controversy when it was discovered that received a loan from the Banco de Reservas on 13 December 2011 for $15 million, well above the equity amount Vargas said owning earlier this year, although the offered guarantees were previously rejected by the management of the Bank Valuations. Members of his party insinuated that the loan, which was approved in eleven days, would be related to Vargas Maldonado's refusal to participate in favor of the party's presidential candidate Hipólito Mejía in the election campaign 2012.

He is currently president of the PRD. He is also president of the "Socialist International for Latin America and the Caribbean" and, since 2013, vice president of the International Socialist worldwide.

== See also ==
- List of foreign ministers in 2017
- List of current foreign ministers
