= Jacinto Peynado Garrigosa =

Vice-president of the Dominican Republic

Jacinto Bienvenido Peynado Garrigosa (9 March 1941 – 9 August 2004) was a businessman and politician who served as Vice President of the Dominican Republic from 1994 to 1996.

== Biography ==
His father was Enrique Peynado Soler (son of the late president Jacinto Peynado y Peynado and Mercedes Soler Machado), and his mother was Miguelina Olimpia Garrigosa Thormann (daughter of Miguel Garrigosa Gallardo and Olimpia Thormann Lamarche).

He married Margarita Altagracia Álvarez Sorrentino, the daughter of Jaime Tomás Álvarez Valverde (1915–1993) and Margarita Sorrentino Visonne, an immigrant from Secondigliano, Italy.

Peynado Garrigosa chaired the commercial society Commercial Delta, a company founded by his father, which was car dealership in Dominican Republic of the automakers Toyota, Lexus and Volvo.

He was senator to the National Congress for the National District during the 1986–1990 and 1990–1994 periods; Vice-President of the Republic in the trimmed term comprised between 1994 and 1996. In the 1996 presidential election he was the candidate of the Social Reformist Party Christian (PRSC), but he finished in third place in the election as he did not receive the support of the PRSC's adherents. In the 2000 presidential election, Peynado was the running mate of Joaquín Balaguer.

Peynado died in Miami on 9 August 2004 as consequence of a cancer. His widow, Margarita Álvarez de Peynado, was the vicemayor of the Dominican capital city from 2002 to 2016 and deputy to Roberto Salcedo.

== Family tree ==
16. José Gregorio Peynado (†1840)
8. Jacinto Peynado Tejón (1829–1897)
17. Enemencia Tejón
4. Jacinto Bienvenido Peynado y Peynado (1878–1940); San Cristóbal, Dominican Republic
18. Pedro Piñeiro
9. Manuela María Peynado (1849–?)
19. Mónica Peynado Tejón
2. Enrique Peynado Soler (1913–); Santo Domingo, Dominican Republic
20. Félix Soler Nadal; Barcelona, Spain
10. Félix Eduardo Soler Rodríguez (1843–1924)
21. Jerónima Rodríguez Moreno
5. María de las Mercedes Consuelo Soler Machado (1880–1956); Santo Domingo, Dominican Republic
22. Manuel José Machado Peralta (1814–1872); Santo Domingo, Dominican Republic
11. Carolina de las Mercedes Machado Echavarría (1843–1903)
23. María de la Concepción Echavarría Vilaseca; Baní, Dominican Republic
1. Jacinto Bienvenido Peynado Garrigosa (1941–2004); Santo Domingo, Dominican Republic
12. Miguel José Buenaventura Garrigosa Arrom (1858–?); Palma de Mallorca, Spain
6. Miguel Garrigosa Gallardo 1886–1966); San Pedro de Macorís, Dominican Republic
13. Ercilia Gallardo Zaldívar (1866–?); Camagüey, Cuba
3. Miguelina Olimpia Garrigosa Thormann; Santo Domingo, Dominican Republic
28. Cristof Friederich Thormann; Hamburg, Germany
14. William Richard Thormann Falkenstein (1851–1915); Hamburg, Germany
29. Ludovine Falkenstein; Germany
7. Olimpia Thormann Lamarche (1881–1970); Santo Domingo, Dominican Republic
30. José Francisco Lamarche Roulet (1828–?); Santo Domingo, Dominican Republic
15. Rosalía Lamarche y Pérez-Guerra (1855–?); Santo Domingo, Dominican Republic
31. Elodía Josefa Pérez y Pérez-Guerra; Santo Domingo, Dominican Republic

== See also ==
Government offices
| Preceded by Carlos Morales Troncoso | Vice President of the Dominican Republic; 1994–1996 | Succeeded by Jaime David Fernández Mirabal |
