= Jacinto Peynado =

President of the Dominican Republic from 1938 to 1940

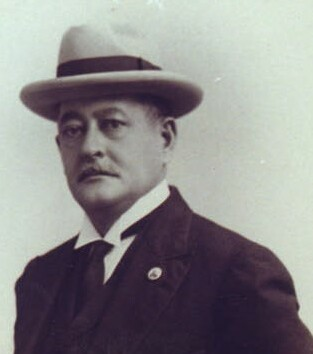
- Portrait, c. 1930s

37th President of the Dominican Republic
- In office 16 August 1938 – 24 February 1940
- Vice President: Manuel Troncoso de la Concha
- Leader: Rafael Trujillo
- Preceded by: Rafael Trujillo
- Succeeded by: Manuel Troncoso de la Concha
- Acting; 22 April 1930 – 21 May 1930
- Vice President: Vacant
- Leader: Rafael Trujillo
- Preceded by: Rafael Estrella Ureña (acting)
- Succeeded by: Rafael Estrella Ureña (acting)

22nd Vice President of the Dominican Republic
- In office 16 August 1934 – 16 August 1938
- President: Rafael Trujillo
- Preceded by: Rafael Estrella Ureña
- Succeeded by: Manuel Troncoso de la Concha

Personal details
- Born: 15 February 1878 San Cristóbal, Dominican Republic
- Died: 7 March 1940 (aged 62) Santo Domingo, Dominican Republic
- Party: Dominican
- Spouse: María de las Mercedes Soler Machado
- Relations: Jacinto Peynado Garrigosa (grandson); Francisco José Peynado Huttlinger (half-brother); José María Bonetti Burgos (half-nephew); José Miguel Bonetti (half-grandnephew)
- Children: 9
- Education: Professional Institute
- Profession: Attorney

Jacinto Bienvenido Peynado Peynado (15 February 1878 – 7 March 1940) was a Dominican politician who served as the 37th president of the Dominican Republic from 1938 until his death in 1940. He previously served as the 22nd vice president under President Rafael Trujillo from 1934 to 1938. As Trujillo was the de facto leader and thus the real power holder behind-the-scenes, Peynado had little power in the presidency.

== Biography ==
Peynado came from a distinguished Dominican family; he was the son of Jacinto Peynado Tejón (1829–1897) and Manuela María Peynado. His parents were related; they were uncle and niece to each other, respectively. Peynado was educated in Santo Domingo as a lawyer and worked as a law professor at University of Santo Domingo. He was appointed minister for justice (attorney general) and public education by President Ramón Báez in 1914 and retained that position in Juan Isidro Jimenez's government. He also served as minister of the interior (which in the Dominican Republic includes overseeing the National Police). His brother, Francisco, had negotiated with Charles Evans Hughes the treaty that terminated the occupation by the United States Marines in 1924.

Peynado briefly served as interim president of the Dominican Republic under the dictatorship of Rafael Trujillo, interrupting Rafael Estrella Ureña's term of office from 22 April until 21 May 1930, when Estrella Ureña resumed the presidency. Peynado served as secretary of the interior, police, and war in General Trujillo's subsequent government. He became secretary to the president in 1932, and was elected Trujillo's vice president in 1934. Peynado was Trujillo's hand-picked candidate in the elections held in 1938. He assumed the presidency on August 16, 1938, though Trujillo largely continued to control the country. Peynado retained office until February 24, 1940, when his ill health forced him to cede the presidency to Vice President Manuel de Jesús Troncoso de la Concha. He died in Santo Domingo (then named Ciudad Trujillo) on March 7, 1940.

== Personal life ==
Peynado married María de las Mercedes Soler Machado (1880–1956) on February 14, 1900. They had nine children: Ramón (1900–1903), Rosa Mercedes (1902–1946), José Bienvenido (1904–1971), Cristina Natalia (1906–1980), María Mireya (1912–1981), Enrique (1913–1997), María Dinorah (1915–2009), María Musetta (born 1920), and Augusta Victoria (born 1921). Only the youngest eight survived childhood.

His grandson, also named Jacinto Peynado, served as vice president of the Dominican Republic from 1994 to 1996.

Political offices
Preceded by Rafael Estrella Ureña	Vice President of the Dominican Republic; 1934–1938	Succeeded by Manuel de Jesús Troncoso de la Concha
Preceded by Rafael Trujillo	President of the Dominican Republic; 1938–1940	Succeeded by Manuel de Jesús Troncoso de la Concha
