= Minister of Foreign Affairs (Dominican Republic) =

Minister of Foreign Affairs of the Dominican Republic
- Ministro de Relaciones Exteriores de la República Dominicana
- Coat of arms of the Dominican Republic

- Incumbent; Víctor "Ito" Bisonó since August 16, 2026
- Ministry of Foreign Affairs
- Style: Mr./Madam Minister (Señor/a Ministro/a) (informal); Chancellor (Canciller) (informal); The Most Excellent (Excelentísimo/a Señor/a) (diplomatic); His/Her Excellency (Su Excelencia) (diplomatic)
- Member of: Cabinet of the Dominican Republic
- Reports to: President of the Dominican Republic
- Seat: Estancia San Geronimo, Santo Domingo
- Appointer: President of the Dominican Republic
- Term length: No fixed term
- Inaugural holder: Ulises Francisco Espaillat
- Formation: April 4, 1874 (152 years ago)
- Salary: RD$300,000 (monthly)
- Website: mirex.gob.do (in Spanish and English)

The Minister of Foreign Affairs of the Dominican Republic is the public official who heads the Ministry of Foreign Affairs of the Dominican Republic. The Minister of Foreign Affairs is a member of the Cabinet of the President of the Dominican Republic. The current Minister of Foreign Affairs, appointed by President Luis Abinader, is Víctor "Ito" Bisonó.

== List ==
This is a list of foreign ministers of the Dominican Republic from 1943 to the present day.

- 1943–1946: Manuel Arturo Peña Batlle
- 1946–1947: Arturo Despradel
- 1947–1953: Virgilio Díaz Ordóñez
- 1953: Rafael Trujillo
- 1953–1955: Joaquín Balaguer
- 1955–1956: Enrique de Marchena
- 1956–1961: Porfirio Herrera Báez
- 1961–1962: Ambrosio Álvarez Aybar
- 1962–1963: José Antonio Bonilla Atiles
- 1963: Armando González Tamayo
- 1963: Andrés A. Freites Barrera
- 1963: Héctor García-Godoy
- 1963–1964: Donald Reid Cabral
- 1964: Luis Aquiles Mejía Guzmán
- 1964–1965: Donald Reid Cabral
- 1965: Horacio Vicioso Soto
- 1965: Jottin Cury (in opposition)
- 1965–1966: José Ramón Rodríguez
- 1966: Carlos Federico Pérez y Pérez
- 1966–1967: Gilberto Herrera Báez
- 1967–1970: Fernando Amiama Tió
- 1970–1972: Jaime Manuel Fernández
- 1972–1975: Víctor Gómez Bergés
- 1975–1980: Ramón Emilio Jiménez
- 1980–1981: Emilio Ludovino Fernández
- 1981–1982: Manuel Enrique Tavares Espaillat
- 1982: Pedro Padilla Tonos
- 1982–1986: José Augusto Vega Imbert
- 1986–1988: Donald Reid Cabral
- 1988–1991: Joaquín Ricardo García
- 1991–1994: Juan Arístides Taveras Guzmán
- 1994–1996: Carlos Morales Troncoso
- 1996: Caonabo Javier Castillo
- 1996–2000: Eduardo Latorre Rodríguez
- 2000–2003: Hugo Tolentino Dipp
- 2003–2004: Frank Guerrero Prats
- 2004–2014: Carlos Morales Troncoso
- 2014–2016: Andrés Navarro
- 2016–2020: Miguel Vargas
- 2020–2026: Roberto Álvarez
- 2026–present: Víctor "Ito" Bisonó

== See also ==
- Dominican Republic
  - List of presidents of the Dominican Republic
  - Vice President of the Dominican Republic
  - List of colonial governors of Santo Domingo

== Sources ==
- Rulers.org – Foreign ministers A–D
