= 1996 Dominican Republic presidential election =

← 1994	16 May 1996 (first round); 30 June 1996 (second round)	2000 →
- Turnout: 78.63% (first round) ▼9.28pp 76.80% (second round)
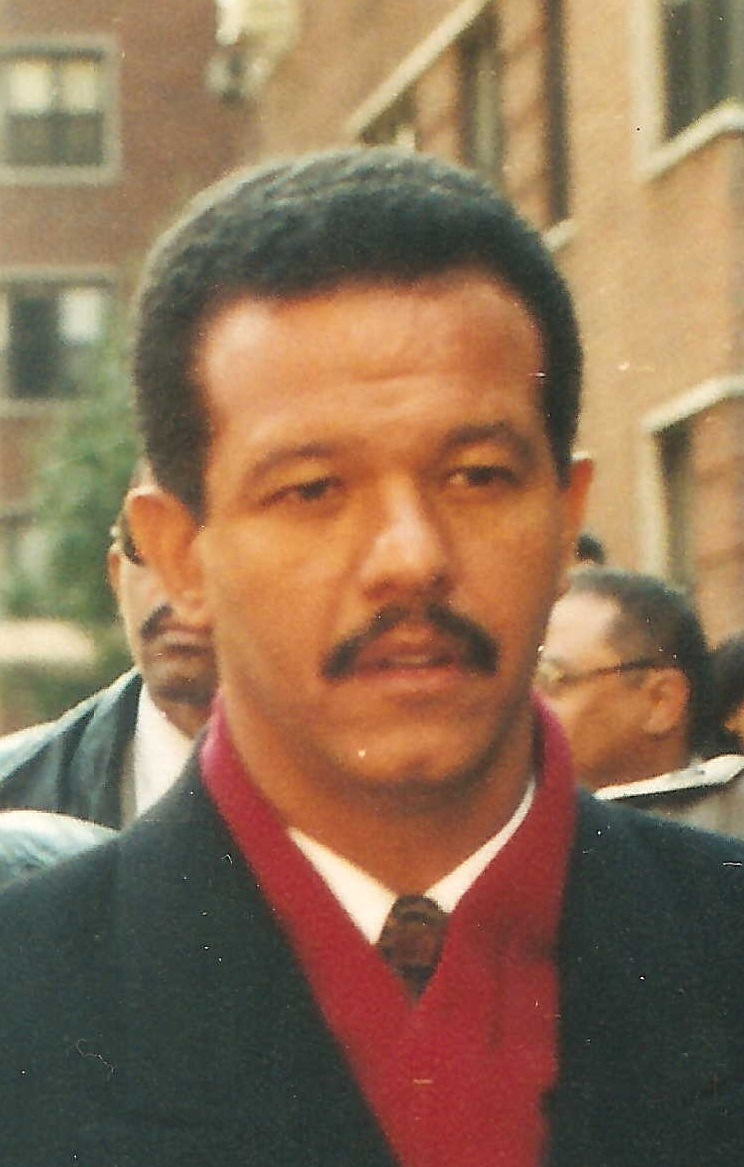

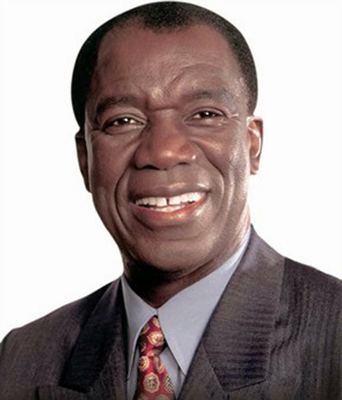
Nominee	Leonel Fernández	José Francisco Peña Gómez
Party	PLD	PRD
Popular vote	1,466,382	1,394,641
Percentage	51.25%	48.75%
President before election
Joaquín Balaguer
PRSC
Elected President
Leonel Fernández
PLD

Presidential elections were held in the Dominican Republic on 16 May 1996, with a second round on 30 June. Whilst José Francisco Peña Gómez won the most votes in the first round, he was defeated by Leonel Fernández in the second round, after the Social Christian Reformist Party, whose candidate had lost in the first round, declared their support for Fernández. Voter turnout was 78.63% in the first round and 76.80% in the second.

Conservatives and business interests opposed Peña Gómez. Peña Gómez, whose parents were Haitian, faced nationalist, anti-Haiti rhetoric in the campaign.

The elections were considered free and fair.

== Results ==
Candidate	Party	First round		Second round	
Candidate	Party	Votes	%	Votes	%
José Francisco Peña Gómez	Dominican Revolutionary Party	1,333,925	45.94	1,394,641	48.75
Leonel Fernández	Dominican Liberation Party	1,130,523	38.93	1,466,382	51.25
Jacinto Peynado Garrigosa	Social Christian Reformist Party	435,504	15.00		
José Rafael Abinader	Social Democratic Alliance	3,907	0.13		
Total		2,903,859	100.00	2,861,023	100.00
Valid votes		2,903,859	98.47	2,861,023	99.33
Invalid/blank votes		45,120	1.53	19,402	0.67
Total votes		2,948,979	100.00	2,880,425	100.00
Registered voters/turnout		3,750,502	78.63	3,750,502	76.80
Source: Nohlen
