= Manuel Fernández Mármol =

Dominican politician

Manuel Fernández Mármol (3 June 1912 – 20 January 1983) was a politician from the Dominican Republic who served as Vice president of the Dominican Republic and Mayor of Santo Domingo.

== Personal life ==
On 20 January 1983, he died of pneumonia at the age of 70. He was a founding member of the Dominican Revolutionary Party.
