= Rafael Estrella Ureña =

Dominican politician (1889–1945)

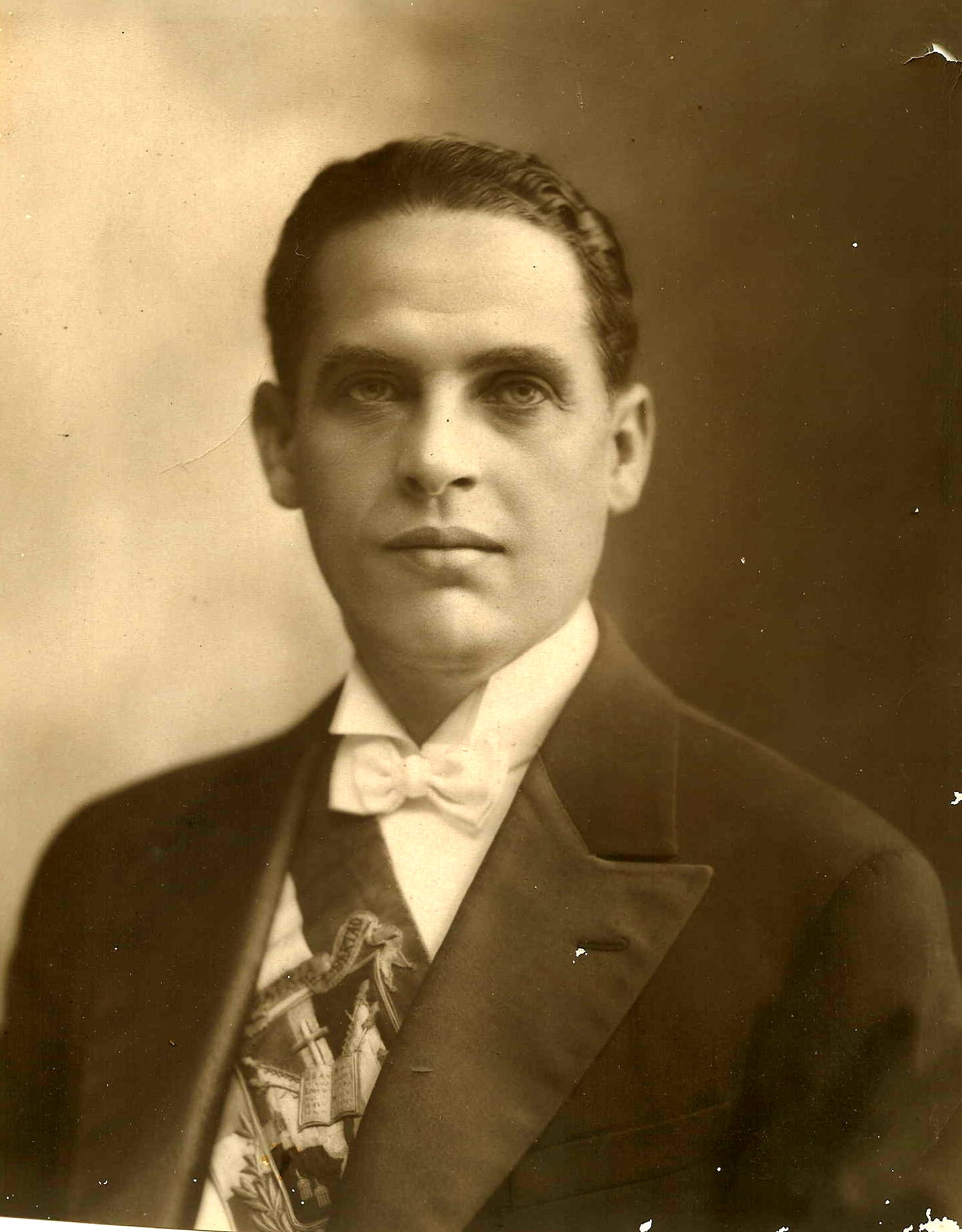
- Official portrait, 1930

Acting President of the Dominican Republic
- In office 21 May 1930 – 16 August 1930
- Vice President: Vacant
- Leader: Rafael Trujillo
- Preceded by: Jacinto Peynado (acting)
- Succeeded by: Rafael Trujillo
- In office 3 March 1930 – 22 April 1930
- Vice President: Vacant
- Leader: Rafael Trujillo
- Preceded by: Horacio Vásquez
- Succeeded by: Jacinto Peynado (acting)

21st Vice President of the Dominican Republic
- In office 16 August 1930 – January 1932
- President: Rafael Trujillo
- Preceded by: José Dolores Alfonseca
- Succeeded by: Jacinto Peynado

Personal details
- Born: 10 November 1889 Santiago de los Caballeros, Dominican Republic
- Died: 25 May 1945 (aged 55)
- Party: Dominican (from 1931)
- Other political affiliations: Liberal Reformist (before 1931)
- Spouse: Tomasina Martínez
- Children: 9
- Profession: Lawyer and Politician

Juan Rafael Estrella Ureña (10 November 1889 – 25 May 1945) was a Dominican politician and lawyer who served as the 21st vice president of the Dominican Republic under President Rafael Trujillo from 1930 until his resignation in 1932. He previously served as the acting president from March to April 1930, where his term was briefly interrupted Jacinto Peynado until the following month where Estrella Ureña retained the role and served until Trujillo's accession to the presidency in August. Estrella Ureña became acting president following the ousting of Horacio Vásquez.

== Biography ==
Estrella Ureña was born on November 10, 1889, in Santiago de los Caballeros. His mother was Juana Antonia Ureña Estévez and his father was Juan Bautista Estrella Durán; he had 1 brother. He later moved with his family to live in Santo Domingo, where he studied at the University of Santo Domingo. Estrella Ureña studied law, and during his college years he mixed with young fans of the doctrines of Puerto Rican independence advocate Eugenio María de Hostos, this made him change his thinking.

Under Eladio Victoria's administration, Estrella Ureña adamantly opposed, and felt dissatisfaction with the assassination of President Ramón Cáceres. He then planned to conspire against Victoria, and with others, he founded the "Partido Liberal Reformista" or "Liberal Reformist Party" which had its fundamental ideology in the ideas of Eugenio María de Hostos. He was eventually imprisoned.

On June 9, 1917, he married Tomasina Martínez Rodríguez (1904–1989) and fathered 9 children.

By 1924, Estrella Ureña fully supported Horacio Vásquez and heavily helped his presidential campaign. In 1925, he founded the Partido Republicano (Republican Party) and was appointed to the department of Justice and Public Instruction. Estrella conspired with the Chief of the Armed Forces, Rafael Leónidas Trujillo, and together, they cut a deal. In return for letting Estrella take power, Trujillo would be allowed to run for president in new sham elections. As the rebels marched toward Santo Domingo, Vásquez ordered Trujillo to suppress them. However, feigning "neutrality," Trujillo kept his men in barracks, allowing Estrella's rebels to take the capital virtually unopposed. On March 3, Estrella was proclaimed acting president with Trujillo confirmed as head of the police and the army. As per their agreement, Trujillo became the presidential nominee of the newly formed Patriotic Coalition of Citizens. Vásquez was forced to resign along with his deputy, Dr. José Dolores Alfonseca. In 1930, Trujillo won the presidential elections and designated Estrella as his vice-president. In 1932, Estrella resigned from the vice-presidency; some say that it was on the pretext that relations between Estrella and Trujillo had become strained.

He died on May 25, 1945, of a surgical procedure. It was rumored that Trujillo was the one who had hired the surgeon to ensure that Estrella was not to survive the operation. In response, Trujillo declared a state of mourning for three days.

== Sources ==
- Biography at the Enciclopedia Virtual Dominicana
