= Víctor Gómez Bergés =

Dominican politician, jurist and diplomat (1940–2023)

- Born: 25 February 1940; Santiago de los Caballeros, Dominican Republic
- Died: 24 February 2023 (aged 82); Santo Domingo, Dominican Republic

Víctor Gómez Bergés (25 February 1940 – 24 February 2023) was a Dominican politician, jurist, and diplomat.

== Life and career ==
Born in Santiago de los Caballeros, Bergés graduated in law from the Universidad Autónoma de Santo Domingo (UASD) at 22, and got a doctorate in Canon Law at the Pontifical Gregorian University in Rome. In 1962, he worked in the Secretariat of State for the Recovery of Assets, and in 1963 he began working in the Secretariat of State for Agriculture.

In 1970, Bergés was appointed Secretary of State for Education, Fine Arts and Culture. He served as Minister of Foreign Affairs between 1972 and 1977, the youngest person in the history of the Dominican Republic to serve in that role, and between 1977 and 1978 he also served as Secretary of State for Finance and Secretary of State for Industry and Commerce.

In 1978, he became senator and was the speaker of the majority coalition in the senate until 1982. In 1983 he was appointed Ambassador Extraordinary and Plenipotentiary of the Dominican Republic to the Vatican, and simultaneously Dominican Ambassador to Greece and Cyprus. Because of his criticism of party leader Joaquín Balaguer he was expelled from Social Christian Reformist Party in 1985; Balaguer and Bergés eventually reconciled, and he was later appointed Ambassador Extraordinary and Plenipotentiary of the Dominican Republic in Argentina and in Paraguay. A deputy of the Central American Parliament between 2000 and 2004, he served as Judge of the Constitutional Court between 2011 and 2018. He also was a prolific writer of political essays, and served as professor at the Pontificia Universidad Católica Madre y Maestra.

Bergés died on 24 February 2023, one day before his 83rd birthday. He was the father of politician Víctor Gómez Casanova, a former deputy and member of the Dominican Revolutionary Party.
