= Miriam Germán Brito =

Dominican judge (born 1948)

Attorney General of the Republic
- In office 16 August 2020 – 24 February 2025
- Preceded by: Jean Alain Rodríguez Sánchez
- Succeeded by: Yeni Berenice Reynoso

Judge of the Supreme Court of the Dominican Republic
- In office 27 December 2011 – 15 April 2019

Personal details
- Born: 8 December 1948 (age 77) Lilas, Hermanas Mirabal Province, Dominican Republic
- Children: 4
- Education: Pontificia Universidad Católica Madre y Maestra

Miriam Concepción Germán Brito (born 8 December 1948) is a Dominican lawyer and judge. She served as Attorney General of the Republic between 2020 and her resignation in 2025 and judge of the Supreme Court of the Dominican Republic between 2011 and 2019.

== Early life and education ==
Germán was born on 8 December 1948 in the village of Lilas, Hermanas Mirabal Province, Dominican Republic, the daughter of a farmen and a dressmaker, and studied in Salcedo. She graduated in law from the Pontificia Universidad Católica Madre y Maestra in 1972.

== Career ==
She began her professional career at the law firm of Salvador Jorge Blanco, and subsequently served as a prosecutor at the peace justice. In 1974, she served as a peace justice in Santiago de los Caballeros and later as a magistrate in Salcedo, until she was appointed an investigating judge in Moca.

Germán then worked in Santo Domingo as an assistant solicitor in the National District Public Prosecutor’s Office, where she remained for several years until she was appointed judge of the First Criminal Chamber in 1986. After a short time as a judge, she worked at a legal advice and assistance centre run by the Catholic Church, and in 1991 she began working in the First Criminal Chamber until she was promoted to the Court of Appeal in 1997. In November 1993 she stood up to the Joaquín Balaguer government’s defiance of the courts to such an extent that the president was forced to take action. In 2002, Germán was appointed President of the First Chamber of the Court of Appeal. In March 2011 she was appointed president of the Criminal Chamber of the Court of Appeal of Federal District.

On 22 December 2011, the National Council of the Magistracy announced Germán’s appointment as a judge of the Supreme Court of the Dominican Republic and she was also elected second alternate to the president. She presided the Criminal Chamber. In 2017, during the review of the coercive measures in the Odebrecht case, Germán issued a dissenting opinion in which she questioned the strength of the evidence presented by the Public Prosecutor’s Office. She argued that the case file contained evidential shortcomings which, if not rectified, would make it difficult to secure convictions at the trial on the merits, and she considered that pre-trial detention was not sufficiently justified. In 2019, her resignation was announced.

Newly elected president of the Dominican Republic Luis Abinader appointed her Attorney General of the Republic and she was sworn in on 17 August 2020. She announced in January 2023 that she was stepping down from her post, but following a constitutional reform that also affected the Public Prosecutor’s Office, she accepted President Abinader’s request to remain in office. Yeni Berenice Reynoso succeeded her on 24 February 2025 and Germán retired.
