= Disappearance of Sudiksha Konanki =

2025 missing person case in the Dominican Republic

Sudiksha Konanki
- Konanki's profile picture on LinkedIn
- Born: December 13, 2004; India
- Disappeared: March 6, 2025 (aged 20); Hotel Riu Republica, Arena Gorda Beach, Punta Cana, Dominican Republic
- Status: Missing for 1 year, 8 months and 12 days
- Education: University of Pittsburgh
- Height: 5 ft 3 in (1.60 m)
- Parents: Subbarayudu Konanki; Sreedevi Konanki

Sudiksha Konanki (Note: English pronunciation: /suːˈdɪkʃə koʊˈnɑːŋki/ soo-DIK-shə koh-NAHNG-ki; Telugu pronunciation: [suː'tʰiːkʂaː 'koːnaŋkiː]) (born December 13, 2004; last seen on March 6, 2025) is a 20-year-old Indian missing person. A permanent U.S. resident and a pre-medical student at University of Pittsburgh, she was last seen on March 6, 2025. On spring break with a few of her friends at Hotel Riu Republica in Punta Cana, Dominican Republic, she was reported to have last been seen with an American on the beach, who has since returned to the U.S., after her disappearance.

== Background ==
Sudiksha was born on December 13, 2004 to parents Subbarayudu and Sreedevi Konanki and was a permanent U.S. resident since 2006. She lived in South Riding, Virginia, and studied at Thomas Jefferson High School for Science and Technology. She attended the University of Pittsburgh and studied Biology and Chemistry with the goal of pursuing a career in medicine.

== Disappearance ==
On Monday, March 3, 2025, Konanki and five fellow students traveled to the Dominican Republic for spring break, staying at the Riu República hotel. On March 6, at around 3:00 a.m., Konanki was seen drinking with a group of five women aged 20–22 and two men aged 22 at the hotel bar. Surveillance footage captured the group heading to the beach at 4:15 a.m. with Konanki seen walking arm in arm with Joshua Steven Riibe (/ˈriːbə/), a 22-year-old college student from Iowa. While the others departed at around 5:00 a.m., Konanki remained with Riibe. According to Riibe, a wave swept them out to sea, and he attempted to rescue Konanki. He claimed to have last seen her walking in knee-deep water. After asking Konanki if she was okay, Riibe vomited seawater he had swallowed and was unable to hear her response. Following this, Riibe did not see Konanki and assumed she had left. He then fell asleep on a beach chair. Surveillance footage shows Riibe leaving the beach at 8:55 a.m.

== Aftermath ==
On March 18, 2025, Konanki's parents requested the authorities to declare their daughter legally dead. However, this request cannot legally proceed, as the Civil Code of the Dominican Republic — specifically the provisions set forth between Articles 112 and 140 — establishes that a declaration of "legal absence" may be sought only after a period of four years of disappearance. Furthermore, such a declaration may be granted only one year after the request has been formally submitted. In addition, the physical presence of the body before a forensic physician is a mandatory requirement for a legal declaration of death.

Riibe, who remained detained for over a week at the Riu República hotel after his passport was confiscated by local authorities when he attempted to check out, was interrogated several times by local Dominican attorneys investigating the case, along with Dominican Attorney General Yeni Berenice Reynoso. His lawyers, Beatriz Santana, Helen Peralta, and Esteban A. Sanchez, submitted a writ of habeas corpus on March 18 and Riibe was released after the court hearing. Riibe then received an emergency passport the next day at the Bávaro U.S. Consulate and left the island immediately with a friend.

A video purporting to show Konanki drowning in the ocean while a man tries to save her widely circulated on social media. It was debunked by Agence France-Presse, who determined that it was actually taken at the Riviera Beach in Sochi, Russia, and that it depicted a different man and woman.

== See also ==
- List of people who disappeared mysteriously (2000–present)
- Disappearance of Natalee Holloway - Alabama woman who disappeared under similar circumstances in 2005
