= Jean Alain Rodríguez Sánchez =

Attorney General of the Dominican Republic (born 1975)

Personal details
- Party: Dominican Liberation Party
- Relations: Rafael Calventi (stepfather); Idelisa Bonnelly de Calventi (stepaunt-in-law)
- Parents: Carlos Ángel Rodríguez Fernández (father); Maybé Sánchez Caminero (mother)
- Website: www.jeanrodriguez.do

Jean Alain Rodríguez Sánchez (born May 10, 1975) is a Dominican lawyer and politician former Attorney General of the Dominican Republic. He was appointed to the position of President Danilo Medina. Before becoming Attorney General, Rodríguez Sánchez served as the executive director of the CEI-RD (2012-2016). He is a member of the Central Committee of the Dominican Liberation Party (Spanish: Partido de la Liberación Dominicana, or PLD), the previous governing political party in Dominican Republic until August 16, 2020.

Rodríguez was arrested in Santo Domingo on June 29, 2021, on charges of corruption. Rodriguez is the first attorney general to be prosecuted in the country's history.

Rodríguez was sanctioned by the United States Department of State under Section 7031(c) on 11 December 2023.

== Early life and education ==
Jean Alain Rodríguez Sánchez was born on May 10, 1975, in Santo Domingo, National District, Dominican Republic, to Carlos Rodríguez and Maybé Sánchez (ambassador of the Dominican Republic to Germany).

Rodríguez's family are long time members of the Dominican Liberation Party. Rodríguez became interested in politics at a young age and decided to follow his family's footsteps and also become a member of the Party.

== Professional profile ==
After obtaining a Bachelor of Laws at the Pontificia Universidad Católica Madre y Maestra (PUCMM for its Spanish acronym) in Santo Domingo, Rodríguez completed three masters: the University of Paris, the Sapienza University of Rome and the National School of Administration in Rome, Italy where he obtained a Masters in Public Administration and Penal Law graduating summa cum laude.

Rodríguez has practiced law for nearly 20 years, has been a professor in the faculties of Dominican Republic for over a decade and also holds a Masters in Spanish, English, French and Italian.

== Political work ==
Since the 1990s, Jean Rodríguez is an active member of the Dominican Liberation Party, where he studied politics.

From then on, he has taken a role as member and campaign manager, contributing in the presidential campaigns of 1996, 2000, 2004, 2008, 2012 and 2016. In some of those campaigns, he was appointed as National Coordinator of Major Projects, presided over external movements of national support, integrated technical teams, worked on the External Movement Coordination, the Transition Acts Committee, as well as other relevant campaign duties.

In 2014, he was elected member of the Central Committee of the Dominican Liberation Party, with over 77,000 votes.

== 2016 presidential campaign ==
During the recent campaign that resulted in the election of President Medina, he served as national coordinator of the Campaign Project "República Digital" (Digital Republic) and presided the movement Renewal with Danilo, one of the three biggest external movements of the country, with over 58,000 members, achieving to concrete over 42,000 votes registered in favor of the President and the candidate.

== Social work ==
Jean Rodríguez is President of the JAR Foundation, a non-profit organisation dedicated to strengthen the wellbeing of vulnerable groups by age minority, poverty situations, marginality and inequality. The organisation conducts annual operations favoring children and vulnerable groups, including charitable journeys in empoverished zones.

== Public service ==
Rodríguez was the Attorney General of the Dominican Republic from August 16, 2016, until August 16, 2020. He served as executive director of the CEI-RD (2012-2016), legal adviser to the Directorate General of Customs (2004–2005), of the Dominican Institute of Telecommunications (INDOTEL) (2004–2009) and of the Tourism Ministry (2004–2006), auxiliar lawyer of the Tax Attorney of the National District (1997), substitute judge and member of the Board of the National District (2010–2012), as well as other public functions.

=== Executive Director of the Dominican Republic Export & Investment Center ===
On August 17, 2012, President Danilo Medina appointed Rodríguez as Executive Director of the Dominican Republic Export & Investment Center (CEI-RD for its initials in Spanish), via the presidential decree number 460-12.

During his tenure as director of the CEI-RD, he received a bronze medal in 2012, a silver medal in 2013 and two gold medals for his excellent role as a public official in CEI-RD in 2014 and 2015.

Rodríguez's management style produced a much more transparent entity according to the external evaluations of the National Directorate of Ethics and Government Integrity (DIGEIG).

Likewise, the management doubled the assistance to exporters and investors and quintupled the capacitations offered and the promotional vacations in which the country has presence.

Under his directorate, the four-year presidential period 2012-2016 ended with a toughened place no. 1 as investment destination in the entire region; the development of the One Stop Investment; over 9.5 billion US dollars in direct foreign investment; an increase in exportations of almost 14%, in times in which the world's exportations suffer an average decrease of 10%; and more than 108,000 jobs and work opportunities generated by the investment attraction and the development of exportations. Direct foreign investment was a key part of his campaigns when he took on the role.

=== Attorney General of the Dominican Republic ===
Rodriguez's restructured the Attorney General's Office and created a new office within it focused on crime prevention.

Rodriguez has favored prison reform, and particularly the "New Penitentiary Model." as the AG pretends to give “unprecedented support” in favor of this urgent reform.

As attorney general, Rodríguez has sought to combat gender-based violence, based on prevention, prosecution, and participation of civil society. In coordination with the Ministry of Education, the AG has developed an educational program to prevent gender-based violence from a very young age. Individual guides have been adapted for different age groups. The attorney general's office created new care units for victims in all provinces and planned to create three correctional facilities for male aggressors. The office also prohibited the previous practice of sending citations, restraining orders, orders of arrest, amongst others, to male aggressors with their female victims.

Under Rodríguez, the AG's office has expanded its digitization and digital services. to request services from the comfort of their homes through friendly digital platforms

Notable public corruption cases handled by the Attorney General's Office include the Embraer Super Tucanos, Institute of Potable Water and Sewage Systems (INAPA), Odebrecht and other cases. Rodríguez has spoken out against embezzlement, impunity, and white-collar crime.

Rodríguez opened the Odebrecht case in the Dominican Republic after the United States Department of Justice, in December 2016, disclosed information about acts of corruption by Odebrecht in several countries, including the payment of bribes in the Dominican Republic. Odebrecht's offices in the Dominican Republic were raided and there were more than 25 interviews of congresspersons, officials, lobbyists, lawyers and auditors. During the first weeks of January 2017, Rodríguez requested the temporary suspension of Odebrecht as a government contractor, a measure that was confirmed by the Office of Contracting and Procurement.

In a 2017 plea agreement, Odebrecht admitting to bribing officials to secure contracts and agreed to pay a $184 million fine. Rodríguez asked for certified copies of the confessions of Odebrecht executives, sanctioned by the Supreme Court of Brazil. Rodríguez met with his Brazilian counterpart on the case.

The Odebrecht cases resulted in the arrest of several persons, including persons charged included ministers, ex-ministers, and other officials accused of money laundering, bribes and submitting false sworn financial statements. Rodriguez sought prison terms of for charged. In 2017, the Special Judge of the Preliminary Hearings of the Supreme Court of Justice, Francisco Ortega Polanco, declared there was enough evidence provided by the AG for the case to go to trial and ordered that 10 of the 14 defendants in the case be detained pretrial. One of the accused was a fugitive, and subject to an arrest warrant and Interpol notice). Those remanded include Victor Diaz Rua, who had previously served as the country's Minister for Public Works and Communications, as well as the nations current Minister of Commerce, Temistocles Montas, who handed in his resignation to the Dominican president as a direct consequence of his being remanded. Rodríguez described the prosecutions as an important anti-corruption move.

Rodriguez has sought for more vigorous prosecution of crimes related of illegal deforestation.

In March 2017, the AGO's office issued an average salary increase of 25% for all public prosecutors and the first wage scale for the office. Through the National School of the Public Ministry, at the request of the AG, a training program has been developed for all staff.

Rodriguez has also sought to modernize the office with greater use of updated technology.

== 2021 Corruption Charges ==
On June 30, 2021, Dominican authorities arrested Rodriguez over accusations of diverting public funds towards groups that supported the Dominican Liberation Party and destroying records related to extraditions, asset seizure, and criminal activity during his tenure as Attorney General of the Dominican Republic. He is accused of defrauding the Dominican state out of more than RD$6 billion (US$103.4 million dollars) as part of a complex criminal ring whose activities included conspiracy, fraud, bribery, forgery of public documents, identity theft, cybercrime, and money laundering. Rodriguez is the first attorney general to be prosecuted in the country's history.

The arrest took place after Rodriguez was prevented from boarding a flight headed towards Florida on June 24, 2021. The decision to prevent Rodriguez from leaving the country was controversial, as no arrest warrant had been issued against him at that time.

Rodriguez’s arrest comes as a result of a public corruption investigation titled Operation Medusa (Spanish: Operación Medusa led by Yeni Berenice Reynoso, prosecutor and director of the Government Specialized Anti-Corruption Prosecution organization (Spanish: Procuraduría Especializada de Persecución de la Corrupción (PEPCA)). Authorities also arrested other former officials in the attorney general’s office under Rodriguez’s tenure, including Miguel José Moya, Javier Alejandro Forteza, Altagracia Guillén Calzado, and Rafael Antonio Mercedes, and raided several properties belonging to the arrested individuals and their relatives, including a residential property owned by Rodriguez’s mother.

On July 13, 2021, Rodriguez was sent to pre-trial detention for 18 months. Three former officials were likewise sent to pre-trial detention, while three other individuals implicated in the case were ordered to serve their pre-trial detention in house arrest.
