= Francisco Domínguez Brito =

Dominican lawyer and politician

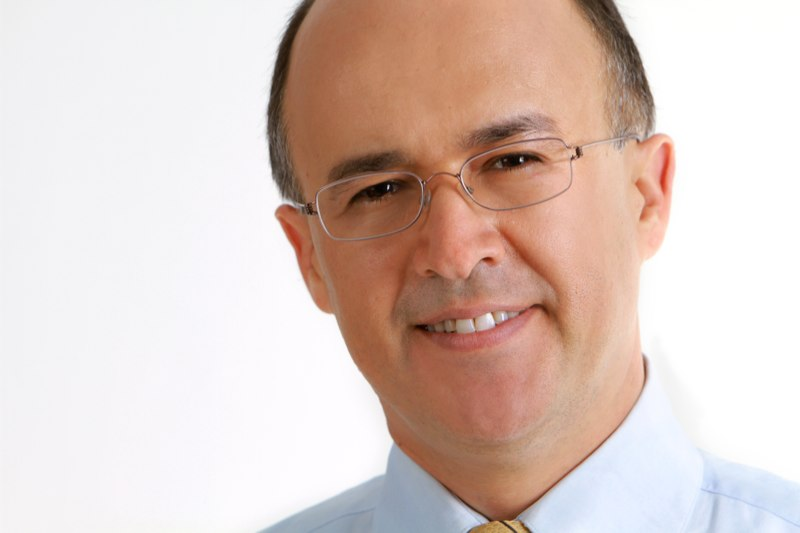

Minister of the Environment and Natural Resources of the Dominican Republic
- In office August 16, 2016 – May 10, 2018 (resigned on April 26, 2018)
- Preceded by: Bautista Rojas Gómez
- Succeeded by: Ángel Estévez

Senator for the Province of Santiago de los Caballeros
- In office August 16, 2006 – August 16, 2010
- Preceded by: José Rafael Abinader
- Succeeded by: Julio César Valentín

Attorney General of the Dominican Republic
- In office August 16, 2012 – August 16, 2016
- Preceded by: Radhamés Jiménez Peña
- Succeeded by: Jean Alain Rodríguez
- In office August 16, 2004 – August 16, 2006
- Preceded by: Víctor Céspedes Martínez
- Succeeded by: Radhamés Jiménez Peña

District Attorney of the National District
- In office October 1997 – August 16, 2000
- Preceded by: Guillermo Moreno
- Succeeded by: Máximo Aristy Caraballo

Personal details
- Born: Francisco Javier Tadeo Domínguez Brito; October 28, 1965 (age 60) Gurabo, Dominican Republic
- Party: Dominican Liberation Party (PLD)
- Education: Pontificia Universidad Católica Madre y Maestra; Panthéon-Assas University
- Occupation: Lawyer
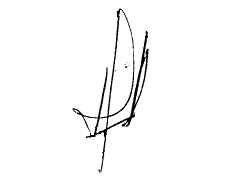
- Signature
- Website: http://dominguezbrito2020.com

Francisco Javier Tadeo Domínguez Brito (born October 28, 1965, in Santiago) is a Dominican lawyer and politician.

He has been Minister of Environment and Natural Resources (2016), Minister of Labor (2011), Senator (2006), Attorney General (2004) and District Attorney of the National District (1997). In Congress he stood out for being the senator with more laws passed in the 2006–2010 four-year period; made significant contributions to the Constitution of the Republic proclaimed in the year 2010 and received wide acceptance for managing a vast cultural and educational agenda in favor of its province Santiago. As Prosecutor of the National District and Attorney General of the Republic he pursued and obtained significant convictions in crimes that moved Dominican society in the last decades of 20th century and promoted an institutionalization program for criminal and prison prosecution systems.

He is a member of the Central Committee of the Dominican Liberation Party (PLD).

== Early life ==
Francisco Javier Domínguez Brito is a Dominican lawyer and politician. He was born in Santiago, Dominican Republic on October 28 on 1965. Son of Mr. Pedro Domínguez Rosario and Mrs. Elsa Brito de Domínguez.

He did his primary and basic studies at the Colegio de La Salle in Santiago. In 1988 she obtained a law degree from the Pontifical Catholic University Mother and Teacher (PUCMM). In 1991 he completed a master's degree in Social Thought at this same university and a master's degree in Civil Law at the Panthéon-Assas University in Paris, France.

In the private sphere, he has been a legal advisor to the Chamber of Deputies of the Republic, professor of 'History of Political Ideas' at PUCMM, Director Executive of the Institutional and Justice Foundation (FINJUS), as well as a consultant to the National School of the Magistracy in relation to the Program of Implementation of the New Criminal Procedure Code; of the State Reform and Modernization Support Project (PARME), which operates with funds from the European Union; and of the Judicial Statistics Research Project implemented by the Justice Studies Center of Las América (CEJAS) whose headquarters are located in Santiago, Chile, among other institutions.

Also, he is a Notary Public of the number of the Jurisdiction of Santiago, member of the Santiago Bar Association and the Bar Association of the Dominican Republic.

== Political career ==
Francisco Domínguez Brito joined the PLD in the year 1984. Thus, he began his partisan work in that year, leading on that date a "Work Committee", in what was the "Captain Máximo Cabral" work nucleus. A year later, he went on to direct the "Youth Front of the Maximo Cabral" and in 1986 he entered a study circle.

Once a full member of the PLD in 1988, he occupies different functions in the grassroots committees to which he belonged until he was elected in 1992 a member of the Middle Management, after the Political Committee approved the elevation of the working nucleus to "Maximo Cabral Intermediate Committee". In this Committee he held the role of organization manager until the year 1994. In that same year, he was unanimously elected by the "Maximo Cabral Intermediate Committee" as a candidate for deputy mayor.

After the electoral process of 1994, he went to Paris, to carry out post-graduate studies at the University of Paris II (Pantheon Assas). There he organizes a circle of studies and becomes the founder of the PLD section in France. In January 1995 he directed the Electoral Commission in Madrid, for the election of the Party Directorate in Europe. Upon his return to the country in 1995 he is elected Secretary-General of the "Maximo Cabral Intermediate Committee". He was reelected in 1997 unanimously as secretary-general. In this period he also stands out for being the founder of the "Rosa Sosa Intermediate Committee". In 1998 he is appointed deputy secretary of the organization and is elected member of the Central Committee, a position he holds until now.

== Private practice ==
In the private sector, he has been a legal advisor to the Chamber of Deputies of the Dominican Republic, a professor of "History of Political Ideas" in the Pontifice Universidad Catolica Madre Maestra (PUCMM), and Executive Director of Institutional and Justice Foundation (FINJUS). He has also been a consultant to the National Judicial School regarding the Program to Implement the New Criminal Procedure Code, the Project for the Reform and Modernization of the State (Parma), which operates with funding from the European Union and Research Project on Judicial Statistics implemented by the Justice Studies Center of The Americas (CEJAS) headquartered in various locations including Santiago, Chile.

Also, he is a Notary Public of several jurisdictions in Santiago, and a member of the Bar Association of Santiago and the Bar Association of the Dominican Republic.

== Public service ==
Francisco Domínguez Brito has held important public positions in the Dominican Republic:

=== District Attorney of Santo Domingo (1997–2000) ===
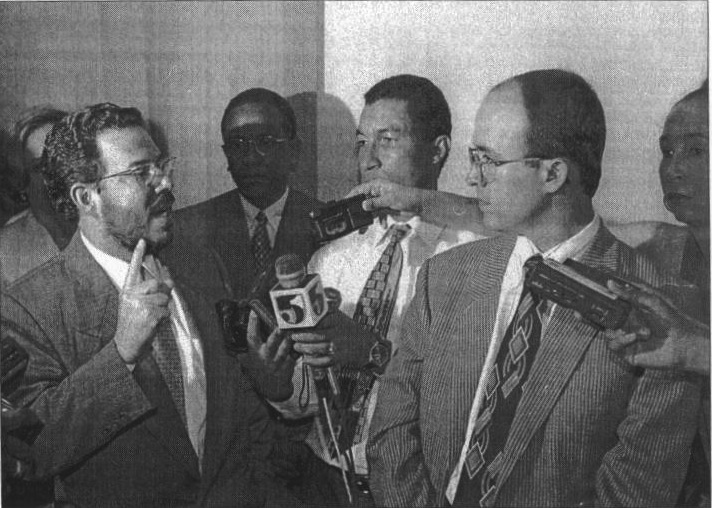
The prosecutor outgoing (left) addresses Francisco Domínguez Brito (right) who observes and awaits his oath by the Attorney General Abel Rodríguez del Orbe. September 25, 1997.

On September 23 of the year 1997, by presidential decree 404-97 the President of the Republic Leonel Fernández Reyna appointed Francisco Domínguez Brito as Prosecutor of National District of Republic replacing Dr. Guillermo Moreno García. At just 31 years of age, Dominguez would become the Prosecutor of the youngest National District in contemporary history.

Convictions outstanding cases. Among the important convictions obtained during his administration, those against civilians and military officers accused of the murder of the renowned Dominican journalist Orlando Martínez Howley, which occurred in 1975 during the authoritarian government of Joaquín Balaguer, stand out and that for the two young people accused of the murder of the teenager José Rafael Llenas Aybar in the year 1996.

Organizational change. In the Prosecutor's Office of National District, Francisco Domínguez Brito promoted profound reforms both in the organizational aspect and in the direction of the criminal investigation to make the entity a modern institution, with clear and transparent procedures. In its management period, the administrative unit responsible for receiving and managing the files, serving and informing the public was created; Through it, all processes were simplified and automated. He initiated the seizure of the courts randomly using an automated lottery, which broke with a manual tradition and non-transparent methodologies. A database and effective control of detainees was initiated through a systematic procedure for registering and identifying them by capturing biometric data from the moment they entered the judicial system. To standardize processes and measure performance, a manual of functions and procedures of all departments was developed.

Institutional change. At the structural level, the departments that existed were redesigned. Deputy prosecutors were assigned to the different police units (stations or detachments), as well as to the National Drug Control Directorate (DNCD). In this way, the Public Ministry (Ministerio Público) assumed control of the investigations from the moment he was aware of the criminal offense, generating a coordinated and immediate reaction. The Department of Internal Affairs and Special Investigations, whose deputy prosecutors were in charge of investigating any official who was engaged in exercising their functions, was also created and equipped with trained personnel. Similarly, the Department of Family and Minors and the Department of Intellectual Property were created.

Finally, under the direction of Domínguez Brito, the Office of the National District gave priority to an extensive program of alternative dispute resolution. With this program, conciliation between the parties was sought in cases in which the public interest and citizen security were not compromised, thereby ending the conflict through the agreement, thus avoiding minor offenses from entering the judicial system.

=== Attorney General of the Republic (2004–2006) ===
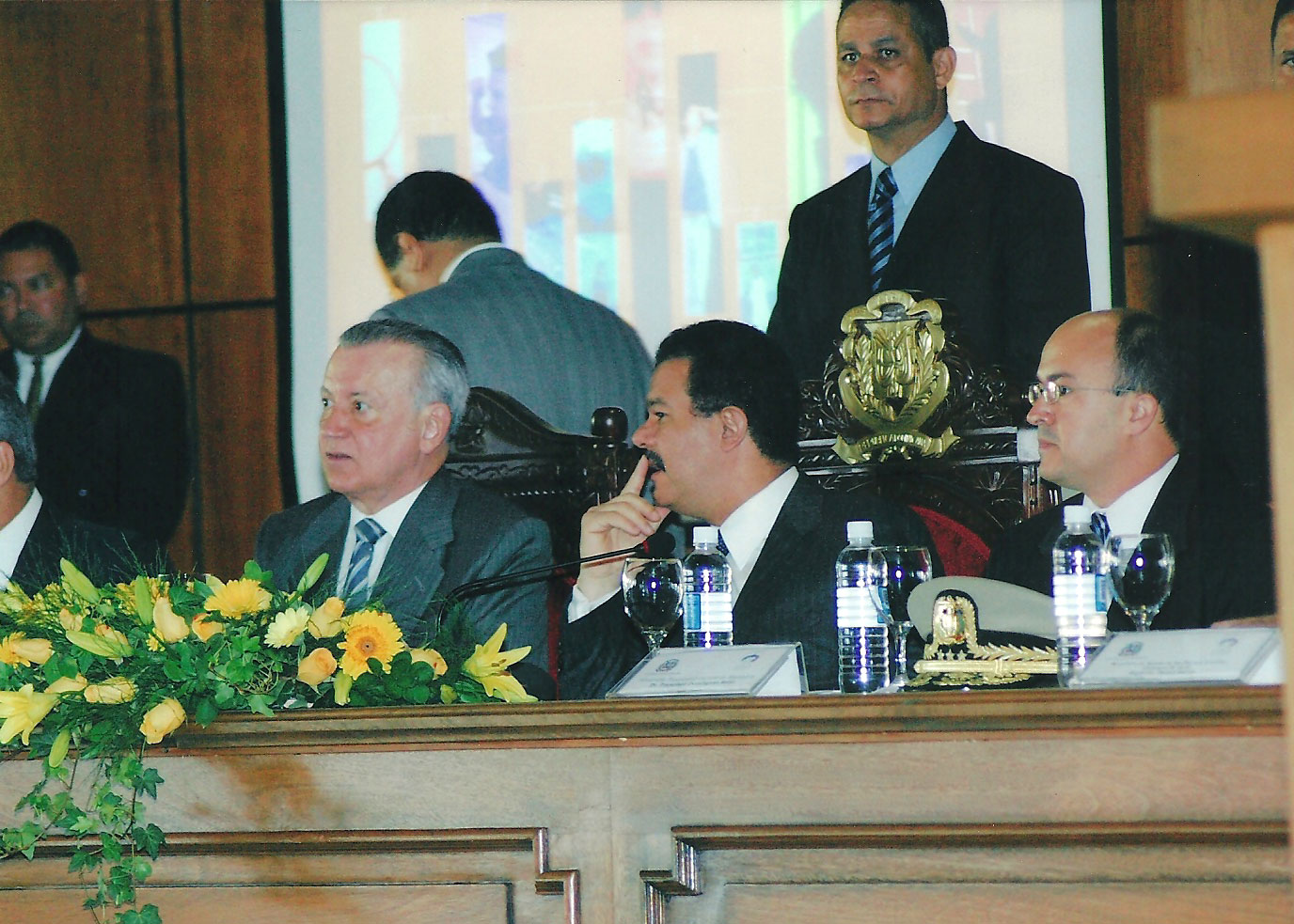
El vice president, Dominican President and Francisco Domínguez Brito in 2005 .

On August 16 of the year 2004, by presidential decree 861-04 the President of the Republic Dr. Leonel Fernández Reyna appointed Francisco Domínguez Brito as Attorney General of the Republic. When he took office, he was barely 38 years old and thus became the Attorney General of the Republic youngest of the Contemporary history. Then he declared that his administration would be based on the sacred commitment to honor the truth, respect due process and guarantee constitutionally protected rights for all Dominicans and Dominicans.

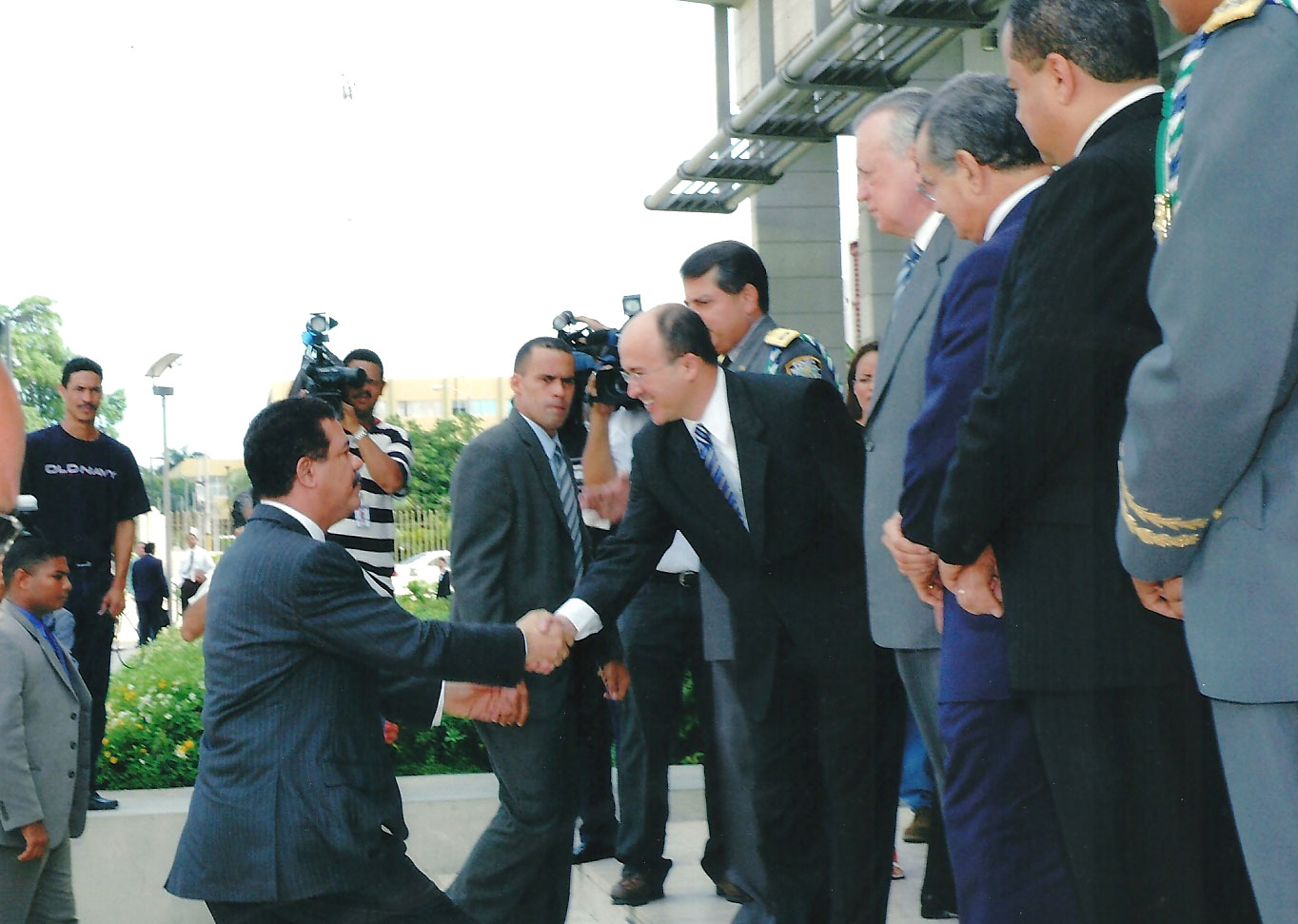
Francisco Domínguez Brito, greets Dominican President upon his arrival at the headquarters of the Attorney General's Office January 5, 2005.

The institutional challenge. By assuming Prosecutor a strategic plan was developed based on the analysis of the challenges presented to the Public Prosecutor's Office the New Criminal Procedure Code (approved two years earlier), the implementation of the Statute of the Public Ministry (approved a year earlier), its interrelation with the other entities of the Justice System and society. To respond effectively to the new procedural order, the Public Ministry was oriented to establish the necessary units and units to guarantee better treatment and technical and scientific specialization. He received an institutional budget of 654 million Dominican pesos (approximately US$18 million).

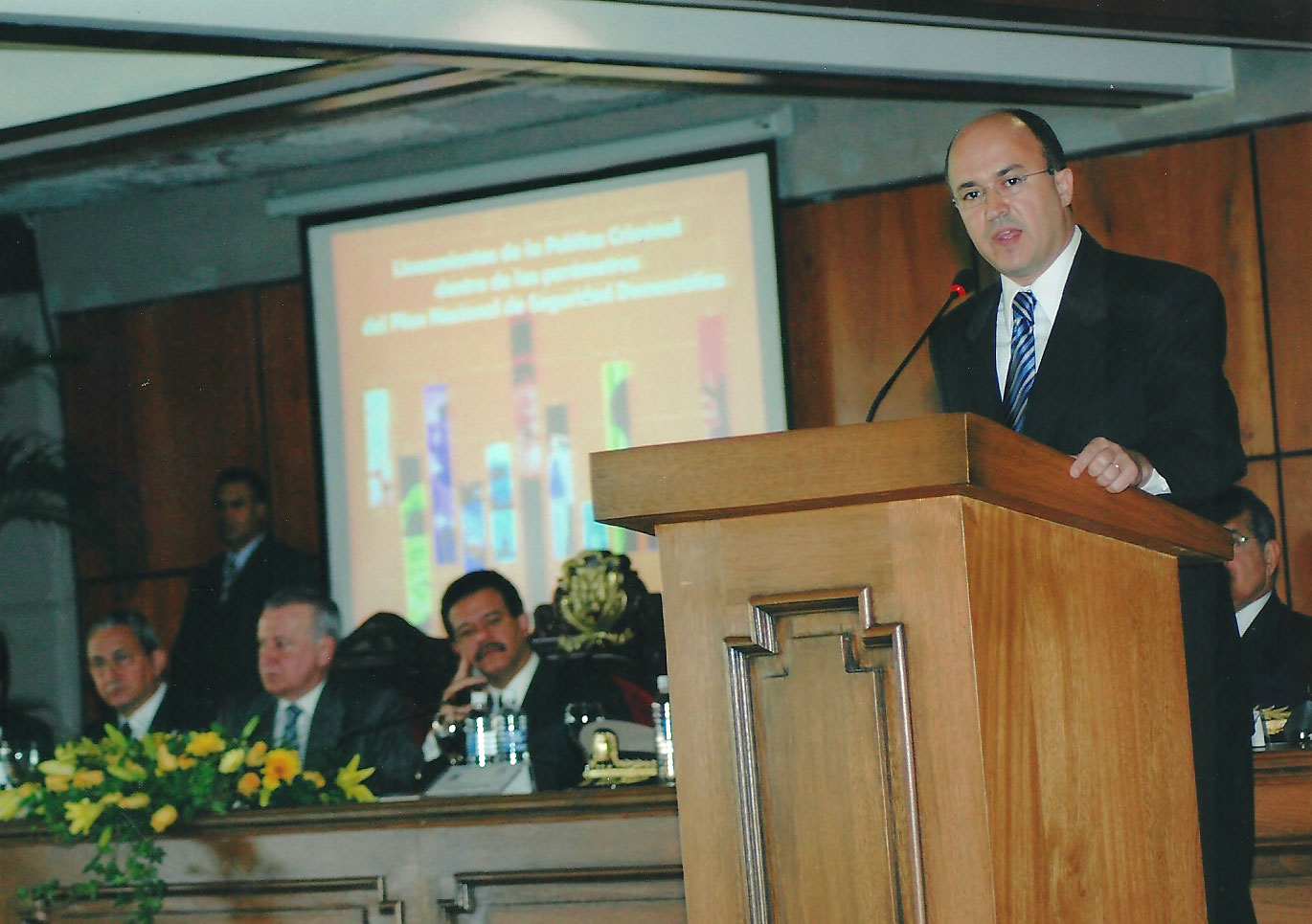
Francisco Domínguez Brito, addresses the auditorium at the headquarters of the Attorney General's Office, observes behind vice president, Dominican President and the President of the Supreme Court Court Dr. Jorge Subero Isa. January 5, 2005.

Training and qualification. Aware that the task of theoretically adapting the Public Prosecutor's Office for a new procedural scheme and the necessary implementation of the prosecutors' career was monumental, Dominguez decided to address both issues simultaneously. The initial training of candidates for career prosecutors on the one hand and the training of current prosecutors on the other through the 'Extraordinary Training Programs' was carried out through the new National School of Public Prosecution (ENP). The first promotions of career prosecutors were incorporated as of the year 2006.

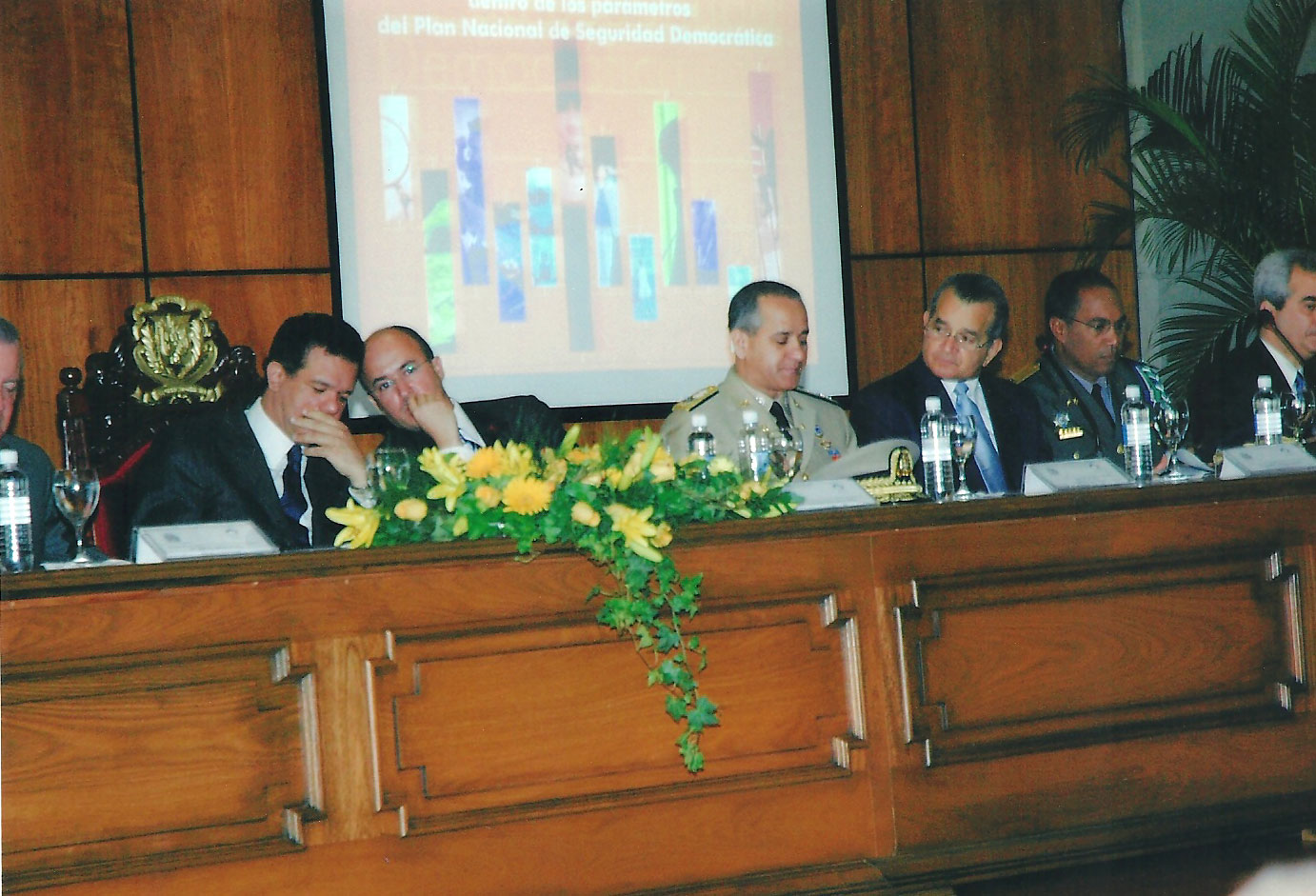
Francisco Domínguez Brito talks with Dominican President, on the right the Ministers of the Armed Forces, Interior and the Chief of the National Police, in Santo Domingo 2005.

Administration of resources and priorities. Adapting technically and providing appropriate technological resources to the Public Ministry needed a considerable budgetary boost, so Francisco Domínguez managed to allocate for the year 2005 double that of the previous year (reaching 1,100 million Dominican pesos ). Due to the marked deterioration and the deplorable conditions that it presented, the transformation of the prison system was promoted through the accelerated conversion of prison facilities to the so-called "new prison model". In the first stage, 9 of the 35 prisons in the country were incorporated into the new model. When the Office of the Prosecutor assumed the country's prison system, it barely received 16% (110 million Dominican pesos) of the institution's total budget; by 2006 after two years of prioritization, spending had increased to 34% (509 million Dominican pesos).

The technification of the criminal investigation needed to be institutionalized, and on several occasions, Domínguez advocated the creation of judicial technical police. During this period, the National Institute of Forensic Sciences (INACIF).

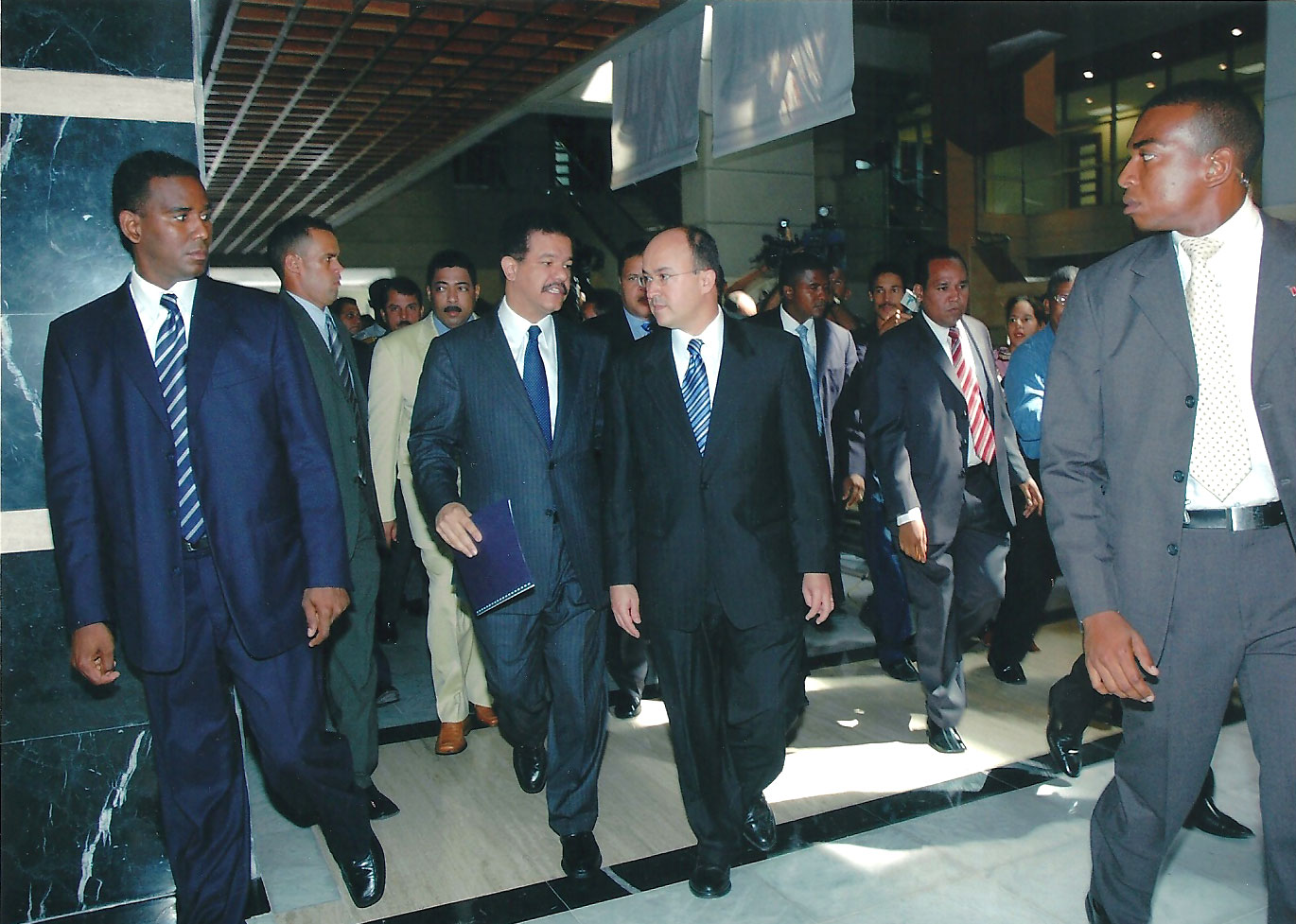
Francisco Domínguez Brito, walks with the Dominican President Leonel Fernández on a tour of the new Courthouse of Santo Domingo in 2005.

Interinstitutional cooperation and transparency. As Attorney he was appointed a member of the Technical Unit of the National Commission of Ethics and Fight against Corruption (CNECC). From here, they promoted important initiatives related to the regulation of the state procurement and contracting regime, first through a Presidential decree and then through the bill that would later govern the matter. Public ethics commissions were also created and programs for the promotion and promotion of the principles established in the Code of Ethics of the Public Servant (Law 120–01) were established.

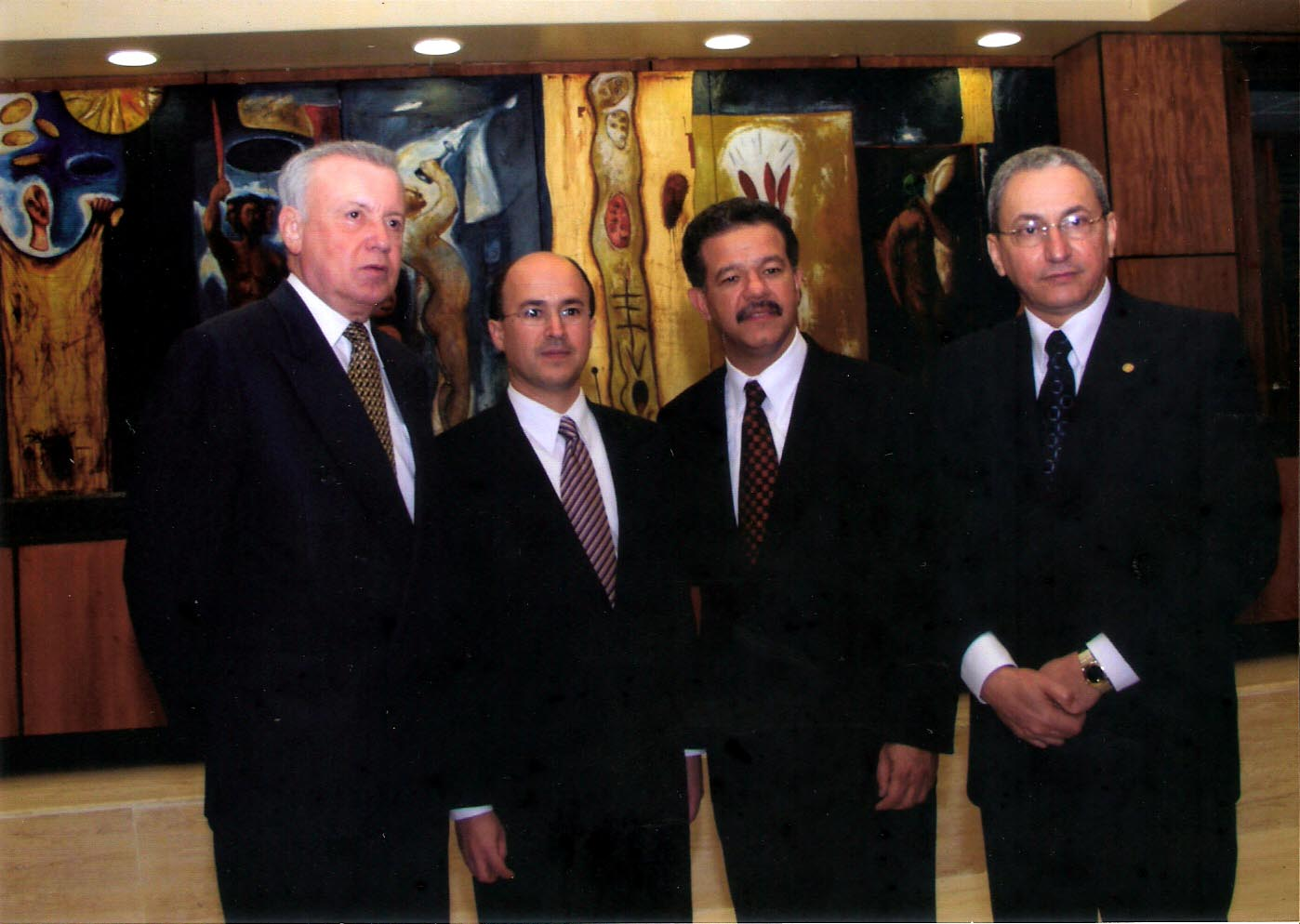
The Rafael Alburquerque, "Francisco Domínguez Brito", Dominican President, and President of the Supreme Court in 2005.

The new institutionality in the Office of the Attorney General of the Republic. Under this management were created:

- the Office of Attention to Victims; the Criminal Information System (SIC); the Unit of the Public Ministry anti Money Laundering;
- Neighborhood or community prosecutors, implementing alternative dispute resolution, to offer quick access to justice, contributing to the discharge of cases, social peace and alleviating the work overload that previously characterized the old system inquisitorial;
- Specialized centers for domestic violence in the National District, the province of Santo Domingo, Santiago, La Vega and Baní; to strengthen the programs of care for victims of family abuse; Awareness raising of institutions that usually detect cases of family violence, especially police, school and health authorities, so that they provide adequate care to the victims and, where appropriate, seek the intervention of specialized institutions.

=== Senator for the province of Santiago (2006–2010) ===
Being Attorney General of the Republic, on February 1 of the year 2006 he requested a provisional license to get involved in the electoral process to be held on 16 May of that year:

"(...) I want to inform you that today I am proceeding to apply for a license for three months without pay ..., as of February 16 of this year for the purpose of assuming the candidacy of the Senate for the province of Santiago, "he said.

On August 8, he formally resigned from the position of Attorney, to assume the Senate for the Province of Santiago.

Thus, having been an official candidate for the PLD during the congressional and municipal elections held in Republic on May 16 of the year 2006, Francisco Domínguez Brito became the senator elected by the province of Santiago by obtaining 156,499 valid votes (53.25%).

He was sworn in on August 16 of that same year by the President of the Senate of the Republic Reinaldo Pared Pérez.

He served as president of the Justice and Human Rights Commission, responsible for deciding on issues related to judicial organization, the creation, and removal of courts, the approval, and discussion of codes and procedural laws, the prison administration; as well as the protection and safeguarding of fundamental rights and public freedoms.

==== Approved legislative initiatives ====
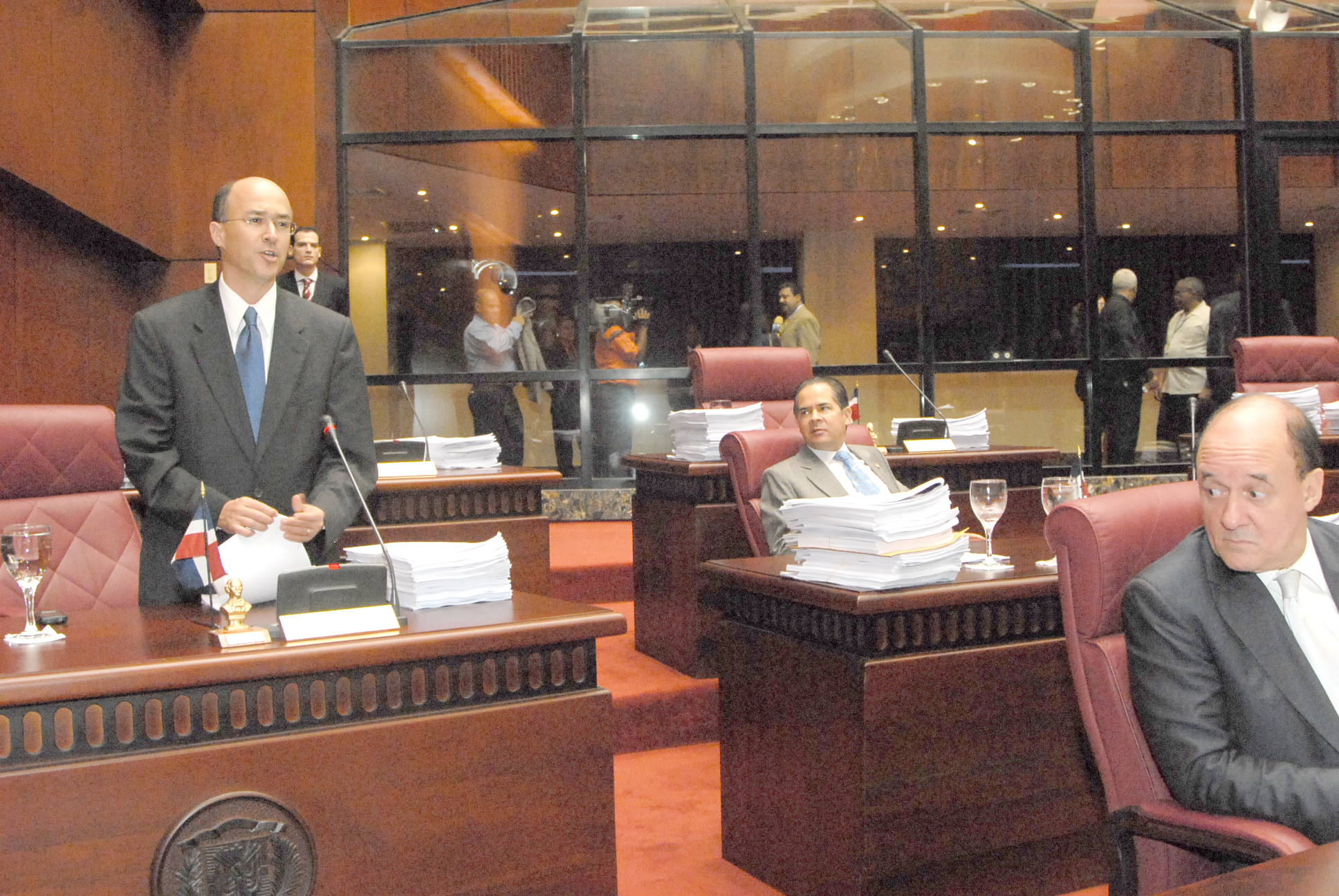
Francisco Domínguez Brito addresses the senators of the Republic. To the right seated the senators Antonio Cruz and Prim Pujals Nolasco, October 17, 2009.

Law Number	Subject and Date of promulgation
12 -07	Law on fines established in the Criminal Code and special laws and strengthening of the national prison system, May 2007.
13-07	Law of transition towards the jurisdictional control of the Administrative activity of the State, of February 2007.
176-07	Law of National District and the municipalities, of July 2007.
218-07	Amnesty Law on Late Declaration of Birth, August 2007.
222-07	Law by which modifies the literal e, of article 78 of the law 66-97 of the General Law of Education, of August 2007. (Validity of school textbooks).
454-08	Law through which the National Institute of Forensic Sciences of the Dominican Republic (INACIF), of October 2008 is created.
481-08	General Law of Archives of the Dominican Republic, of December 2008.
479-08	General Law of commercial companies and individual limited liability companies, of December 2008.
489-08	December 2008.
174-09	Law that modifies literal b of art. 70 of Law No. 241 of 1967, on traffic and construction of islets on motorways, modifies art. 19-bis of Law No. 1474, on communication channels and adds art. 37 to Law No. 202-04, on Protected Areas to create the ecological corridor classification, of June 2009.
181-09	Law amending articles 15, 16, 17 of Law No. 50-87, on the official Chambers of Commerce and Production, of July 2009.
108-10	Law for the promotion of Cinematographic activity. Submitted jointly with President of the Senate and approved in ordinary session in December 2009. Promulgated in August 2010.
86-11	Law on the Unavailability of Public Funds, which details that Public funds deposited in financial intermediation entities or allocated in special sub-accounts of the National Treasury for the benefit of the State organs, as well as the amounts owed to them by natural or legal persons for concept of taxes or any other cause, may not be withheld as a result of retentive embargo or opposition of any nature.
146-11	Law designating mahogany, the national tree of Republic and Rosea de Bayahibe, the national flower of Republic.

==== Social and cultural initiatives ====
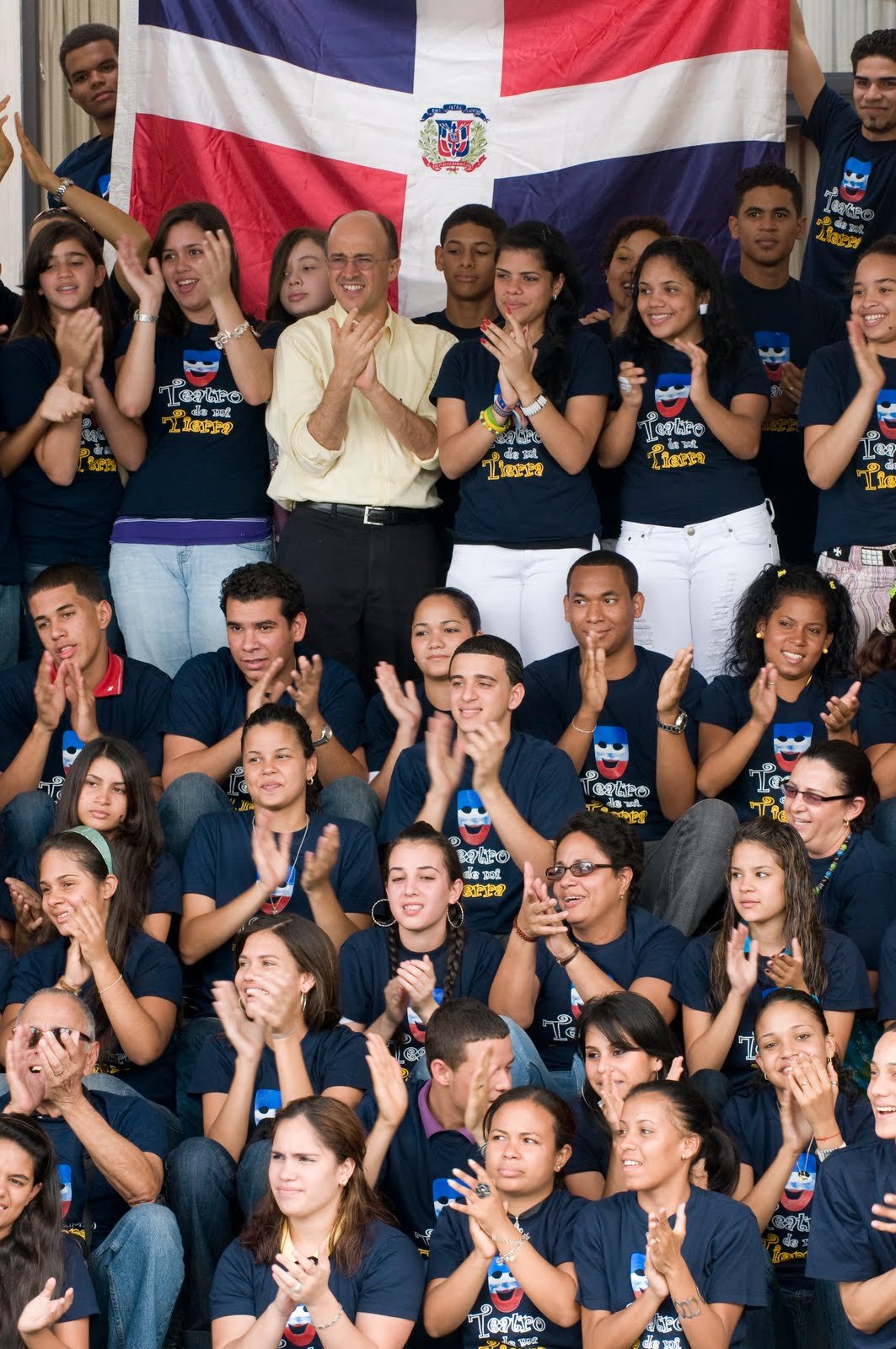
Francisco Domínguez Brito, together with young participants of the IV Festival of School Theater, Santiago, March 2010.

The senatorial management of Francisco Domínguez Brito, under the slogan A management for All, was set as a goal since its inception to support the process of school, human and professional training of the citizens of Santiago. In this sense, the highest percentage of the resources administered by the Senate office was dedicated to this chapter through relevant activities and events, among which are:

Program	Description
Scholarships	Designed to contribute and improve the situation of those students with limited financial resources; It included programs of study at the technological level to boost the entrance and satisfactory exit in priority careers for the regional and national development of the country
Provincial School Theater Festival	To establish the foundations of a theatrical movement in the region that originated in middle-level schools and could generate, through theatrical practice, intellectual and spiritual enrichment for the integral development of young people. More than 60 educational institutions, 60 theater productions, conferences, workshops, and 15 thousand participants held an edition every year since 2007.
Computer Training Center	It is a joint initiative with the Dominican Telecommunications Institute (INDOTEL) and was especially dedicated to people with visual disabilities. More than 1,300 students paraded through their classrooms.
Santiago Bilingual City	It aims to develop appropriate strategies in the planning of the curriculum of the education system that allows graduates of schools of English as a second language.
Rehabilitation of educational centers	More than fifty teaching centers were benefited by this initiative that seeks to improve their facilities and infrastructure.
Environmental Action	The Senate Office supported the activities of institutions such as the Board of Trustees of the Central Park, the Undersecretariat of Forest Resources, the Ecological Society of Cibao, Inc, the Saltadero Foundation, among others.
Support to social services institutions	Despite the efforts made by the Central Government to reduce poverty and help Dominicans in a situation of marginalization, the role of philanthropic institutions and social good is becoming increasingly relevant. Among the institutions with which the Senate Office related in its efforts are: The Arturo Grullón Children's Hospital, the Jesus Volunteer with the Children, the House Home for Mothers, the SOS Villages, the Special Education Rehabilitation Center, Street Action, Children with a Hope, Shelter for battered women, Civil Defense, Siervas de María, among others.

=== National Assembly: Constitutional Reform (2009) ===
In the framework of the reform process to the constitution Dominican initiated in the year 2008, and after the approval of the law that declared the need for Congress to avoid these tasks, the November 12, 2008 Francisco Domínguez Brito presented the preliminary proposal of the report regarding the Convocation Bill for Constitutional Reform, which supported the constitutional reform as a result of The need for institutional strengthening, the establishment of criteria for incorporating international standards into domestic law, the extension of constitutional procedures that allow the system of weights and balances to be efficient, the consolidation of the rule of law and compliance with the law, of the scope of transparency in the actions of the administration, of guaranteeing economic democracy through an instrument for the integral development of the nation Ion: the person, the family and society, and finally the substantive rule reform is supported by the need to incorporate new legal figures.

Since the conclusion of the Popular Consultation process initiated to prepare a proposal for reform of the constitution, "Francisco Domínguez Brito" expressed his interest in formalizing in the constitutional text a set of precepts that allow enhancing democracy Dominican. In this sense, he used important public scenarios to express his vision about the need to strengthen institutionality and horizontal control mechanisms among the Powers of the State of the Republic, as well as for the establishment of more and better systems. of guarantees to fundamental rights, greater control of public finances, rationalization of electoral rules and processes, among others.

Style Commission Coordinator

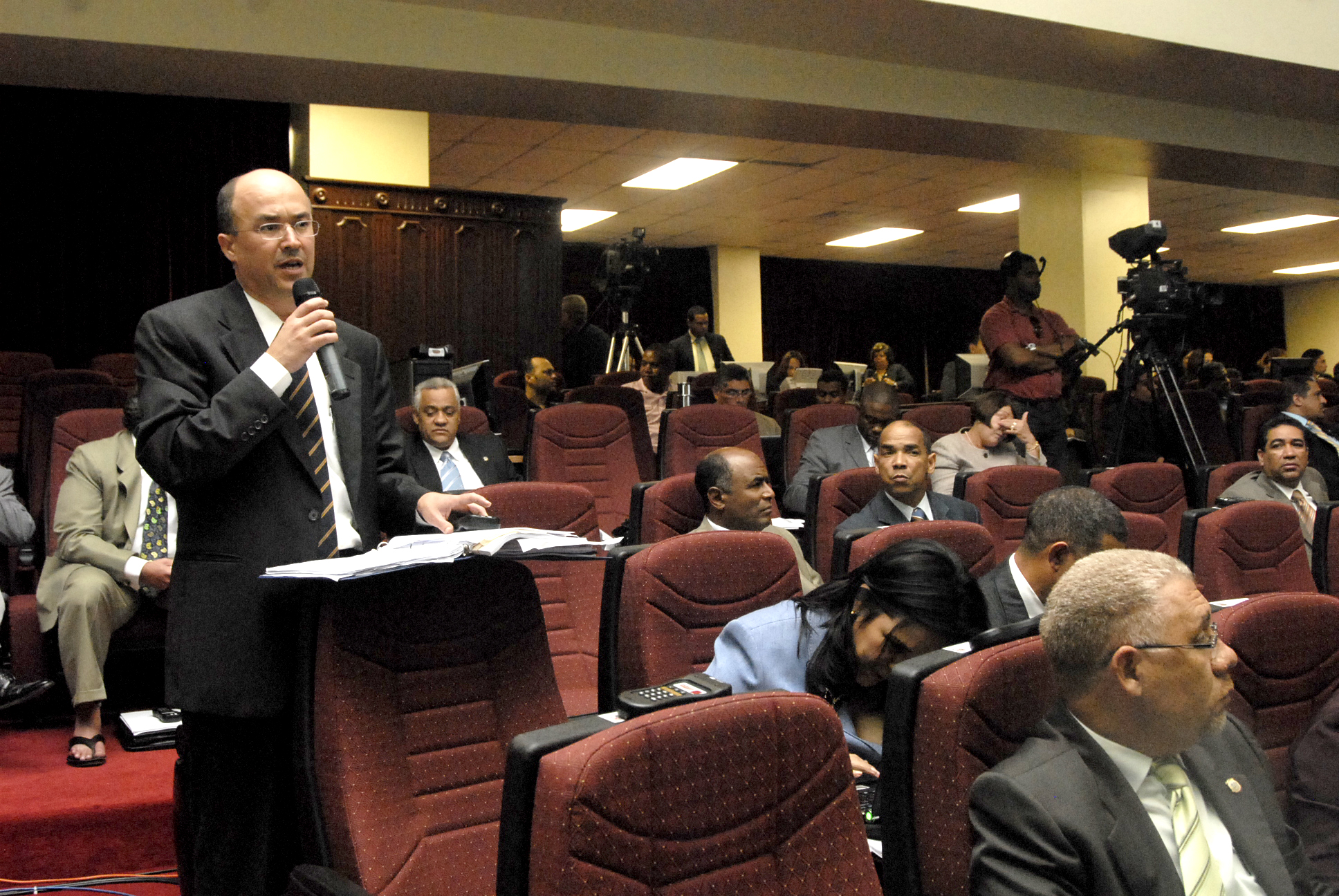
Francisco Domínguez Brito 'addresses the plenary session room of the National Assembly in Santo Domingo, April from 2009.

The Constitution Review Assembly met for the first time on Tuesday March 24 of the year 2009 in Santo Domingo. As Senator representing Santiago, he was appointed a coordinator of the Style Committee (Coordination and Support Body of the National Assembly). The attribution and essential function of the Commission was to review the texts that would be decided by the Assembly at first reading regarding the correct use of the language to be presented to the Plenary in the second reading.

Proposals to the plenary

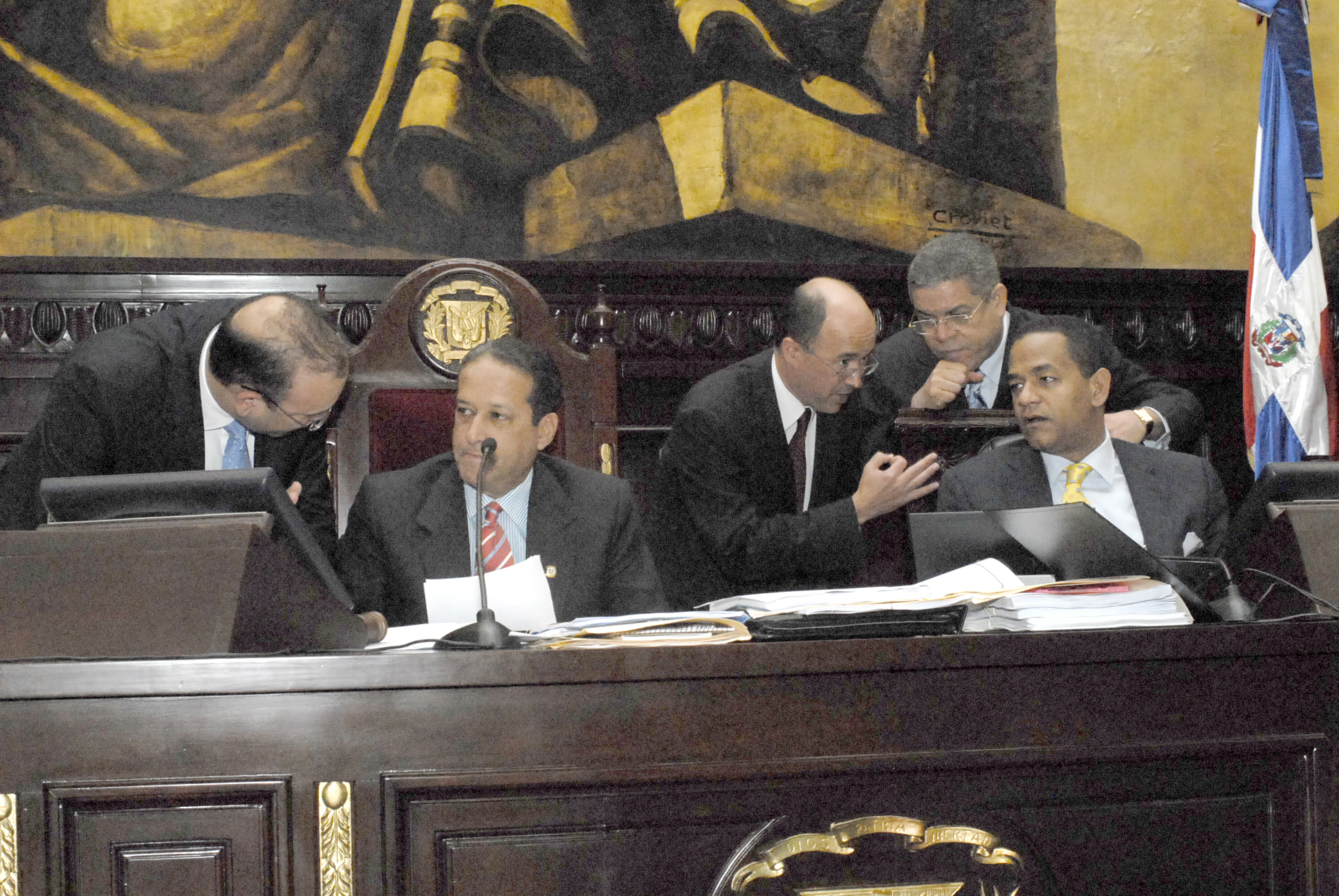
Francisco Domínguez Brito (center) talks with Vice-president of the National Assembly (seated), and with Roberto Rosario spokesman for the opposition (behind). On the left, President of the Assembly (sitting) and Deputy Ulises Cabrera, May 2009.

It was proposed to promote modifications to the constitutional text in force since the year 1966 Regarding the powers of the Executive Power, the National Congress, the Supreme Court of Justice, the Central Electoral Board, the Town Halls and municipalities, the Comptroller General's Office, the Chamber of Accounts, the Attorney General's Office of the Republic, the National Police, the security forces, as well as general principles related to budgetary management, planning, territorial organization, local governments and the fundamental rights of citizens.

Senator Francisco Domínguez Brito expressed his support for the right to education, emphasizing that every human being has the right to comprehensive, quality, permanent education, on equal terms and opportunities. Regarding the right to culture, he promoted the value of the cultural identity, the artistic, cultural and historical wealth of the country and a State that guarantees the protection, enrichment, conservation, restoration and enhancement of the cultural heritage of the nation. He defended the establishment and protection of property rights in all its variants. Regarding the regime of the provinces, it promoted integral regional and provincial development, with the creation of a consultative development council on economic and social matters.

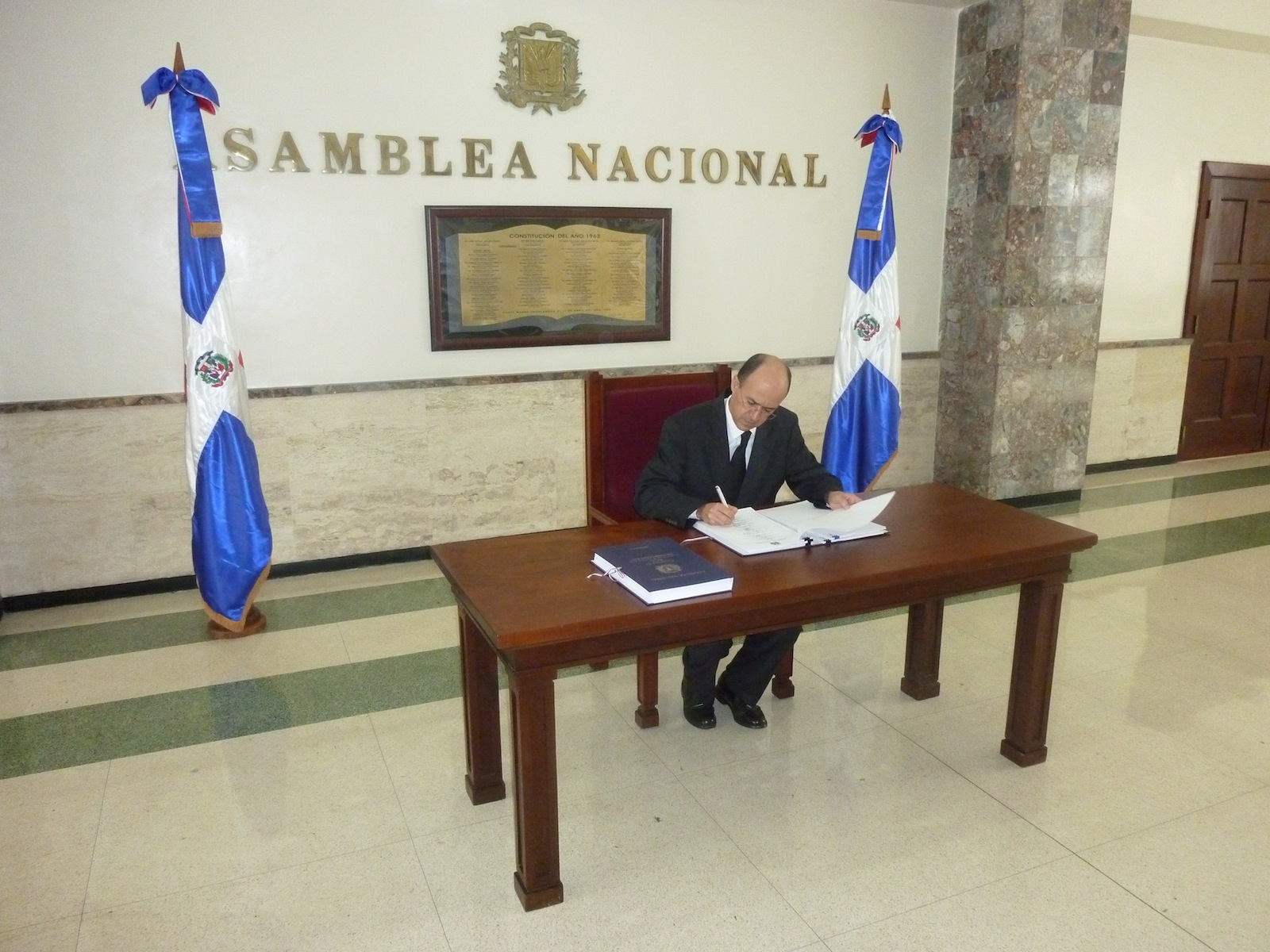
Francisco Domínguez Brito while signing the original document with the new Constitution of the Republic in Santo Domingo, December 2009.

He promoted the condemnation of all forms of administrative corruption. To this end, corruption prevention measures were instituted, establishing the mandatory declaration of assets of public officials, corresponding to the latter proving the origin of their assets. Concerning natural resources, he advocated the use of resources for the development of each of the provinces where they come from.

In the justice sector, Senator Francisco Domínguez Brito 'proposed to establish specialized jurisdictions and clarify the role of Public Ministry as an immovable figure and as a responsible body injustice for the formulation and implementation of State policy against crime, directing the criminal investigation and exercising public action on behalf of society. Similarly, he promoted the role of Public Prosecutor as a defender of fundamental rights, as a promoter of alternative dispute resolution and defender of the public interest protected by law. In the same direction, he promoted the Public Prosecutor's Office, the institution of a Higher Council for the Public Ministry and the extension of powers of the National Council of the Magistracy established in 1994.

Finally, Dominguez introduced by itself or jointly to other assemblymen proposals for modification to more than a hundred articles of the draft Constitutional reform. As president of the Special Commission on the Judiciary, he proposed a new redesign of judicial organization, powers, and prerogatives of the justice system actors in the Republic. Domínguez Brito along with the assembly members of the PLD Minou Tavárez Mirabal and Julio César Valentín Jiminián managed to approve more than a third of the 277 articles of the new Constitution of the Republic proclaimed in the year 2010.

=== Minister of Labor of the Republic (2011–2012) ===
On August 22, 2011, the President of the Dominican Republic Leonel Fernández appointed Francisco Domínguez Brito as Minister of Labor through decree number 494-11. Upon being sworn in on August 26 at the National Palace, he affirmed that Family Insurance and Medical Insurance have been pillars of this Government, and said that these two lines will be which will give priority, as will employment growth:

"We will work very hard to keep improving and administratively be sustainable; There is also the issue of pensions. People want when their work ends, the retirement age; That those funds are there. We will be vigilant in this regard. "

Integrated Labor Registration System (SIRLA). The Integrated Labor Registration System (SIRLA) was implemented in 2011 and consists of an electronic system in which employers can register their companies and workers. This eliminates the need to make purchases and deposits of work forms physically, simplifying the procedures, saving time and making the process transparent. As of July 2012, 561,395 workers and 16,249 establishments had been registered.

Judicial Assistance. The Ministry of Labor offers legal advice to users and has 60 lawyers that are available to all workers and employers for free. During the performance of their duties, during the management of Francisco Domínguez Brito, 6,590 users were served, of which 1,395 received an assignment of lawyers for cases in the courts of the republic: 688 for dismissals, 305 for resignations and 400 for eviction. All the assistance offered left 12,489,932 pesos of compensation received by the workers served.

Labor Inspection. The labor inspection department made 62,787 visits to companies during the period from August 2011 to May 2012. 36,729 warning certificates and 3,127 infraction records were issued. Likewise, personal attention was offered to 305,631 users throughout the country.

Project "Meets and Win". The Project Meets and Wins was a regional initiative funded by the United States Department of Labor, executed in stages in coordination with the Ministry of Labor to increase compliance with labor rights through the strengthening of inspection systems labor. One of the biggest contributions provided by the project was to ensure that more than 11,200 inspection records and more than 65,000 records of attention to people are in the Electronic System of Inspection Case Management (SEMC) in the Local Labor Representations. This electronic tool standardizes inspection reports and reduces internal paperwork since inspectors can access the system remotely.

Institutional agreements. Under the direction of Francisco Domínguez Brito, the Ministry of Labor signed agreements with the Major League Baseball (MLB), the National Institute of Technical-Vocational Training (INFOTEP), the Technological Institute of the Americas (ITLA) and the Cyber Park with the purpose of accompanying the young people discharged in the process of seeking employment as baseball players in a way that allows them to reorient their lives, as well as promoting job reintegration through training, technical-professional training and occupational guidance. An agreement was also concluded with the Catholic Technological University of Barahona (UCATEBA) and the CESAL Non-Governmental Organization, with the objective of working in collaboration for the intermediation, occupational orientation and promotion of employment as well as for studies in coordination with the OMLAD, to know the requirements and needs of the work marking of the Barahona province. A similar agreement was signed with the Presidential Office of Information and Communication Technologies (OPTIC) to integrate the Ministry of Labor into the Center for Attention to the Citizen (GOB Point) located in the Megacentro shopping center. In July 2012, an agreement was signed with the Attorney General's Office, in order to establish an inter-institutional cooperation scheme aimed at promoting the social and labor reintegration of the users of the Free Environment (formed by people who have come out of serving sentences from the new prisons in the country), as well as deported people, through the creation and identification of job opportunities that allow them to generate income to support themselves with their families.

National Employment Service (SENAE). In the period from August 2011 to July 2012, 16,683 vacancies and 65,173 candidates for the Electronic Employment Exchange of the Ministry of Labor were registered. Since its creation, the initiative has registered 5,730 companies, 140,316 job seekers and has evaluated 49,599 job vacancies.

Job Fairs. Between August 2011 and August 2012, with the intermediation of the Ministry of Labor, ten (10) Fairs and ten (10) days of employment were held in the provinces of San Cristóbal, Santo Domingo, Santiago, La Vega, La Romana, Barahona, San Juan de la Maguana, Azua, Baní, Mao, San Francisco de Macorís and Higüey.

Youth and Employment Program (PJE). The "Youth and Employment (PJE)" Program was part of the active employment policies implemented by the Government of the Republic and has been in place since 2003. In the period from August 2011 to July 2012, 341 training courses were held with 119 System Operational Centers (COS) for a total of 10,980 young beneficiaries. Gender equality was maintained in this cycle since 54% of graduates are young women.

Temporary Employment Pilot Project "Santiago Works". The "Santiago Trabaja" Project constituted one of the four components of the Youth Development Program that the Ministry of Labor has executed since 2007, with the support of the World Bank. Santiago Trabaja was designed and implemented as a mechanism to combat unemployment, specifically in the province of Santiago de los Caballeros, following the increase in the level of unemployment resulting from the impact of the international financial crisis and in particular in the sector of the free zone. The objective was to provide 3,335 people with basic skills between 18 and 65 years and directly transfer RD 3,600 pesos per month for 4 months, conditioning their participation in the development of social utility initiatives through sub-projects that develop works or services of social interest, with intensive use of labor.

Dominican Labor Market Observatory (OMLAD). The Dominican Labor Market Observatory constitutes the Research Department of the Ministry of Labor, located in the General Employment Directorate. During the administration of Francisco Domínguez Brito, he completed the studies: "Haitian Immigrants and Labor Market: Study on Construction Workers and Production of Bananas in the Dominican Republic", "Diagnosis of the Labor Market of the Province of Puerto Plata", and the "Overview of the Dominican Labor Market corresponding to the year 2011".

=== Attorney of the Republic (2012–2016) ===
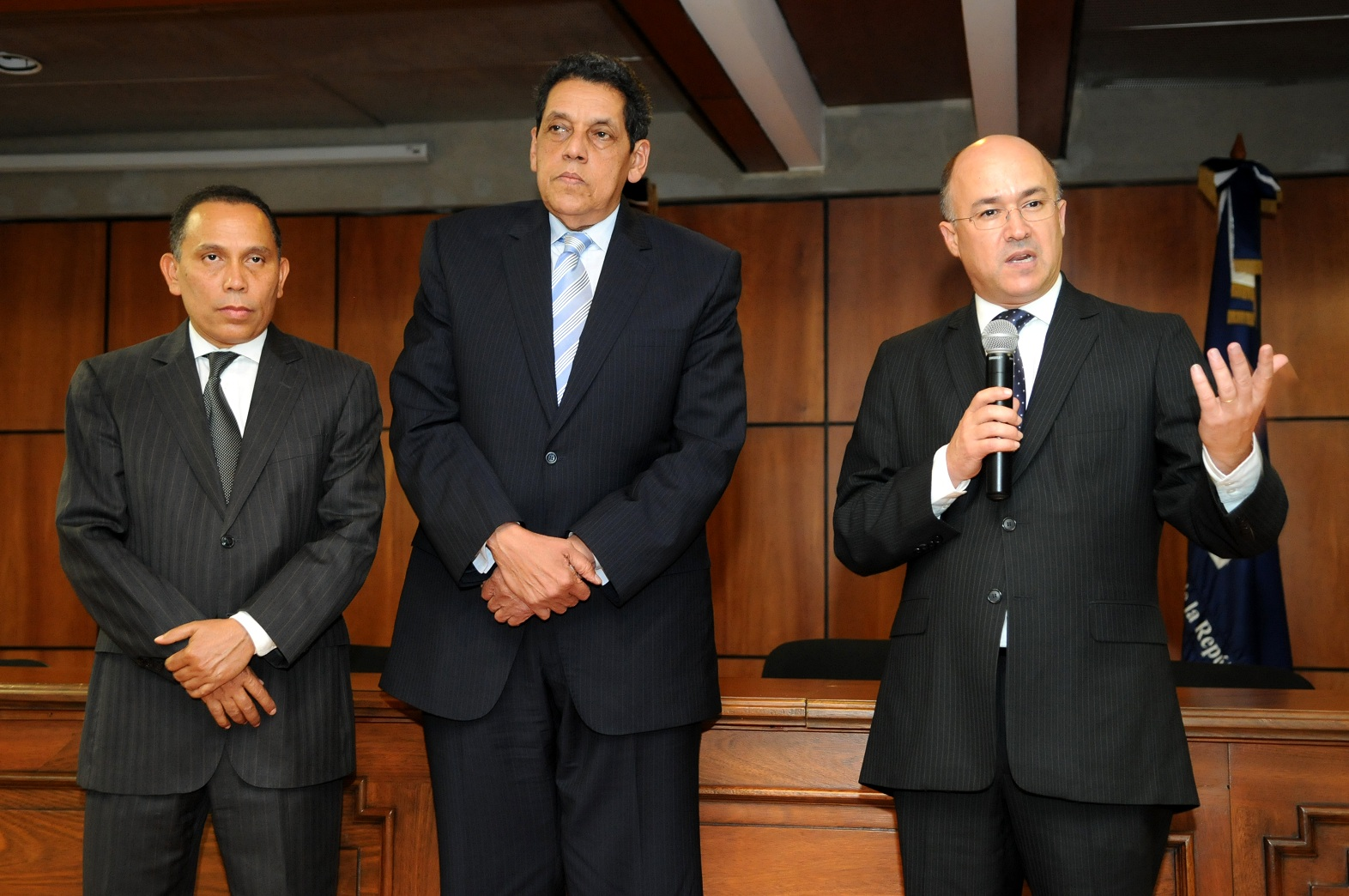
The Attorney General outgoing (left) and the Legal Consultant of the Executive Branch along with Francisco Domínguez Brito (right) who speaks to the press after his inauguration. August 17, 2012.

On August 16, 2012, by decree 454–12, the Dominican President Danilo Medina appointed Francisco Domínguez Brito 'as Attorney General of the Dominican Republic. Upon being possessed by the Legal Consultant of the Executive Branch, he declared:

"Our responsibility is to do the job well, to do things correctly, to carry out our work with passion, dedication and interest, because we are the defenders of society being protected from criminality, which will not win us the battle We are the defenders of the law, we are the defenders of society being protected from dishonesty, we are the ones who guarantee citizen freedom, it is in our hands ... the life of the other, the freedom of the others .. . "

Corruption Prosecutions (August 2012). Eleven (11) days after assuming as Attorney General for the second time, Francisco Domínguez Brito announced that after an investigation led by the Inspectorate of the Procuraduría, it was determined that Pascual Cordero Martínez paid more than one million pesos for the prison director, Mario Acosta Santos, to manage to return him to the "La Victoria" Jail from the Higüey Correction and Rehabilitation Center where he was transferred to have more control of him by the rigor of the New Penitentiary Model. Days later, the Permanent Attention Court of the National District issued three months of pretrial detention in Najayo prison to the former director of Prisons, Mario Acosta.

Suspension of prosecutors (September 2012). The Superior Council of the Public Prosecutor's Office, headed by the Attorney General of the Republic, Francisco Domínguez Brito, suspended twelve prosecutors from the judicial departments from the provinces Santo Domingo, Santiago, La Vega, and Monsignor Nouel. The suspended ones, until they conclude the investigations, are prosecutors Máximo Suárez Frías, Leónidas Suárez, Miguel Morfe Henríquez, Ivelisse Casado and Juan Rosa, all of the Santo Domingo province. Likewise, Carmen Elizabeth Jiménez, Fernando Arturo Martínez Ramos, Ana Cristina Rodríguez, Máximo Peralta and Leiny Rosario Solís, from La Vega. Also, Pedro Celestino Santana Tavárez, from Santiago, and Miguel Alejandro Sharp Jiménez, from Monsignor Nouel.

Proposals for modification of the Criminal Procedure Code (September 2012). On September 14, the Attorney General presented to the National Congress a proposal to amend the Criminal Procedure Code to limit some situations that have allowed prosecuted persons to evade justice, as well as to limit the discretion of judges when imposing coercive measures on repeat offenders or other pending legal proceedings, create a more efficient system for the capture of fugitives or declared in absentia, among others.

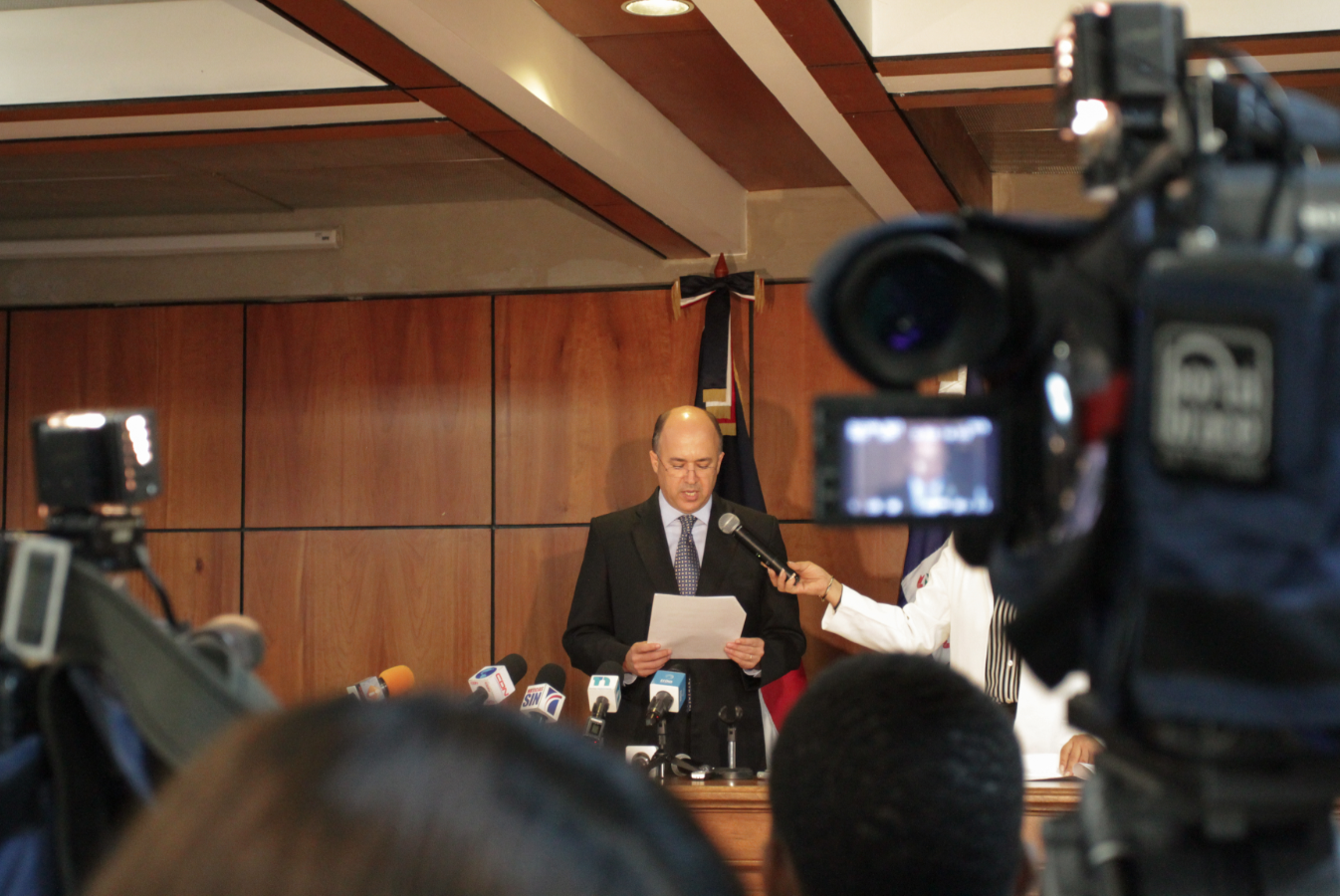
The Attorney General Francisco Domínguez Brito speaks to the press announcing measures taken by the Public Ministry for the prison system. September 27, 2012.

Elimination of privileges in prisons (September–October 2012). On September 28 the Attorney General of the Republic, Francisco Domínguez Brito, ordered the elimination of privileges enjoyed by prisoners millionaires in some prisons. Through a communication sent to the director of Prisons, Tomás Holguín La Paz, Domínguez Brito issued instructions so that no inmate enjoys special privileges, such as the use of air conditioners, televisions, antennas Satellite dishes, laptops, phones, among others. On weekends in a row, with the help of the High-Risk Transfer Unit, 77 inmates were taken and occupied marital cells that had been converted into private suites; murderers, drug traffickers, rapists, and other dangerous criminals were transferred to the Anamuya Correction and Rehabilitation Center in the province of La Romana.

Regulation of seizure of motor vehicles (October 2012). The Attorney General of the Republic instructed all representatives of the Public Ministry to only seize motor vehicles when they constitute a probative and binding element with the process that takes place. The instructions were given through circular number 03646, addressed to the attorneys general, deputies, the prosecutors, and their deputies, as well as to the supervisors. He pointed out that the warning was given to preserving the fundamental right of ownership inherent in every person, which may be violated at the time of kidnapping things, especially motor vehicles.

Prosecution of Senator Felix Bautista (October 2014). On October 22, 2014, Francisco Domínguez Brito sent an indictment and opening request to trial against Senator Felix Bautista deposited with the Supreme Court of Justice. The Office of the Prosecutor requested the appointment of a Judge of Instruction Special, to $2know in preliminary hearing a request for preventive detention and accusation for serious acts of corruption and money laundering against: Félix Ramón Bautista Rosario, Soraida Antonia Abreu Martínez, José Elías Hernández García, Bolívar Antonio Ventura Rodríguez, Carlos Manuel Ozoria Martínez, Gricel Aracelis Soler Pimentel and Welcome Apolinar Bretón Medina. "Domínguez Brito said that with the action against the Senator and Secretary of Organization of the PLD he is fulfilling his responsibility and added:

"I think there is a limit to everything, I think that not everything can be allowed. This is not at this time, this has a lot of time, it is a professional job, and more than anything it is a responsibility of the Public Ministry, which wants the truth to prevail in this case. If there are illicit enrichment and unexplained heritage, society must organize and punish ... because when in a democracy there are no consequences to facts that violate the norms, undoubtedly that also becomes a stimulus for other events to happen. The most important thing for us is that truth and justice prevail, all we seek in this is truth and justice. Dominican society, Dominican democracy, need these criteria to be those that prevail in the work of the entire system. "

=== Ministry of Environment and Natural Resources (2016–2018) ===
Recovery of Protected Areas: Intervention and rescue of the Valle Nuevo National Park with which we guarantee water in quantity and quality for 7 out of 10 Dominicans, about 6 million people; relocation of peasants who lived within the National Park; delivery of houses to these farmers; reforestation of the areas; release of sequestered waters. The intervention of the Haitises improving park conditions. Agroforestry Development Programs: we work together with the Presidency of the Republic seven Agro-Forestry Development programs to recover the abandoned mountains of the south of the country with the planting of 90 million trees and an investment of 6 billion Weights in four years. Rescue of the Ozama and Isabela River: we eliminate the pollution caused by shipwrecks by closing these companies and removing the vessels that polluted the river. Regulation and control of companies that launched their waste without treating aquifers. Social Empowerment: we carry out approaches with Non-Governmental Organizations to be part of the decision-making process and empower them through the signing of dozens of co-management agreements for protected areas so we guarantee that our measures will be sustainable over time. Response to the Citizen. We created the Green Line: a reception center and quick response to citizen concerns and complaints available through direct line (809-200-6400), social networks, WhatsApp and the web. Green Areas: we finish and inaugurate the Santiago Central Park, Villa Altagracia Park; the Botanical Garden of Santiago, among other infrastructures giving priority to the recovery of these spaces for the whole family. Environmental Education: Implementation of the "Growing with My Tree" program to plant together with all the students in the country more than 30 million trees in a year and we start cinema environmental forums in schools through the Green School program. Species Care: we established closures and controls for the protection of species such as parrotfish, shark and black hedgehog. Debureaucratization of the permit: new procedures were established for the delivery of permits in the construction sector, reducing the waiting time from six months to three days. New procedures were also established in permitting in the LPG and non-metallic mining sector making processes more agile and transparent.

Political offices
Preceded by Víctor Méndez	Senator – Santiago de los Caballeros; August 16, 2006–present time	Succeeded by Julio César Valentín Jiminián
Preceded by Víctor Céspedes Martínez	Attorney General of the Dominican Republic; August 16, 2004 – August 16, 2006	Succeeded by Radhamés Jiménez
Preceded by Guillermo Moreno	District Attorney-Santo Domingo de Guzmán; October 1997 – August 16, 2000	Succeeded by Máximo Aristy Caraballo
