= Odebrecht case in the Dominican Republic =

Bribery scandal in Latin America, 2017–2024

The Odebrecht case in the Dominican Republic was a bribery and money-laundering scheme that was part of the wider Odebrecht case which began in Brazil and affected ten countries in Latin America. The Odebrecht case, in turn, was just one part of the sprawling Operation Car Wash scandal.

In June 2017, Supreme Court Justice Francisco Ortega sent eight individuals arrested in connection with the Odebrecht case including two senators and other officeholders to jail and two into house arrest, including several current or former officeholders. Defendants were charged with bribery, money laundering, and other crimes.

By mid-2019, the case appeared to be stalled, until the Public Prosecutor's Office filed charges and sent six to trial, which began in September 2020, but the case was weakened when none of the witnesses could testify to having witnessed bribery.

In June 2021, the former chief of the Public Prosecutor's Office from 2016 to 2020 was arrested on numerous charges related to the case, raising further doubts about the impartiality of the accusations in the case. Nevertheless, two of the defendants were convicted in October 2021, but there were questions about the validity of the ruling. The conviction was upheld in May 2023 by an Appeals Court, but a dissenting justice claimed the decision would likely be reversed on further appeal, In August 2024, the Supreme Court of Justice vacated the Appeals Court decision, declaring the defendants innocent.

== Background ==
=== Operation Car Wash ===
Operation Car Wash was a nine-year criminal investigation (2014 – 2022) that began in Brazil and originally involved money-laundering at the state-owned oil company Petrobras and bribery of government officials, including politicians, senators, governors, and businessmen, which expanded to numerous other companies (notably Odebrecht) and a dozen foreign countries. Considered the largest corruption investigation in Brazil's history.

=== Odebrecht case ===
The Odebrecht case was one part of Operation Car Wash, and on its own was one of the largest transnational bribery schemes in Latin America. At least ten countries were involved: Argentina, Brazil, Colombia, Dominican Republic, Ecuador, Guatemala, Mexico, Panama, Peru, and Venezuela.

Odebrecht S.A. (officially Novonor), is a Brazilian conglomerate headquartered in Salvador, Brazil operating internationally in the fields of engineering, construction, and chemicals including petrochemicals.

== Origins ==
On 21 December 2016, the United States Department of Justice informed the international community of the scope of corruption schemes led by Odebrecht, mainly involving Latin American countries, including the Dominican Republic. The scandal alerted the Dominican Public Prosecutor's Office, headed by Jean Alain Rodríguez, and set in motion the criminal investigation.

== Initiation of the investigation ==
On the morning of 29 May 2017, the Attorney General of the Republic, Jean Alain Rodríguez, implicated fourteen men of being part of the Odebrecht corruption scheme, among them businessmen, politicians (including a minister) and a lawyer. Ten of the accused were immediately arrested; in addition, the Attorney General's Office requested Interpol to arrest the engineer and civil servant Bernardo Castellanos de Moya, who was in Panama. Congress was also requested to lift the legislative immunity of two pro-government senators and one opposition congressman. The Attorney General of the Republic petitioned the Supreme Court of Justice for a preventive detention measure of 18 months for all fourteen.

== Case details ==
=== Initial arrests and preventive measures ===
On 7 June 2017, Special Instruction Judge Francisco Ortega sent eight of the ten arrested in the Odebrecht case to prison, while placing two others under house arrest as a preventive measure.

The Attorney General Jean Rodríguez described the ruling issued by Judge Francisco Ortega, which declared the case complex and imposed coercive measures on the 14 defendants identified as having participated in the bribes admitted by the multinational Odebrecht in the country to secure public infrastructure contracts, as crucial for the fight against corruption and illicit enrichment.

He further stated that the ruling marked the beginning of the effort to end impunity in the country, noting that it was issued after the Public Prosecutor's Office demonstrated the defendants' links to bribery, criminal association, collusion of officials, malfeasance, embezzlement, incompatibility with public office, illicit enrichment, and money laundering.

=== Sentencing of defendants ===
Defendant Ángel Rondón Rijo was given one year of preventive detention at the National Penitentiary of La Victoria; Víctor Díaz Rúa and Conrado Pittaluga were sentenced to nine months in prison at the Najayo Correctional and Rehabilitation Center; Juan Temístocles Montás, Porfirio Andrés Bautista, and Ruddy González were sentenced to six months in prison at the Najayo Correctional Center, while César Domingo Sánchez and Máximo de Oleo were given three months of imprisonment to be served at the Najayo CCR.

Additionally, Radhamés Segura and Roberto Rodríguez Hernández were placed under house arrest for nine months.

An economic guarantee of RD$5 million and a travel ban were imposed on Senator Tommy Galán from San Cristóbal, Senator Julio César Valentín from Santiago, and Deputy Alfredo Pacheco Osoria from the National District.

=== Public criticism and legal proceedings ===
In May 2019, Columbia University professor and CNN en Español columnist Geovanny Vicente Romero questioned in his column, "Why is the Odebrecht case not advancing in the Dominican Republic as it is in other countries?"

In June 2019, the Public Prosecutor's Office filed formal charges against only 6 of the alleged 14 involved, these being Conrado Pittaluga Arseno, Tommy Alberto Galán Grullón, Andrés Bautista, Ángel Rondón Rijo, Roberto Rodríguez, and Víctor Díaz Rúa.

On 19 June, Judge Francisco Ortega Polanco sent the accused to trial. The trial began on 21 September 2020, with the mandatory presence of the six defendants. From the start of the presentation of documentary evidence, the Public Prosecutor's Office appeared to lack substantial proof against the six implicated. Most of the country's lawyers supported the view of then-Supreme Court Justice Miriam Germán Brito, who expressed her opinion in her dissenting vote in 2017. (Note: Supreme Court Justice Miriam Germán Brito wrote in 2017: "It happens that most of the evidence the Public Prosecutor's Office claims to have comes from plea deals made in Brazil. However, these statements do not contain definitive and precise assertions about the activities of the accused. There are many instances of ‘I believe,’ ‘it seems to me,’ and, in some aspects, a clear denial. Given the current state of the process and the evidence presented for the coercive measures, there is a noticeable difficulty in proving the case. If the Public Prosecutor's Office does not address this issue during the investigation—and we hope they do—it does not bode well for the future of the trial, at least not for the substantive phase, where evidence must be conclusive and beyond reasonable doubt.")

=== Weakening of the case and continued doubts ===
Despite the dissenting vote of Germán Brito, who is currently the Attorney General of the Republic, the Public Prosecutor's Office did not strengthen the evidence. During the testimony, none of the witnesses could identify any connection between the businessmen Ángel Rondón and Víctor Díaz Rúa, or with the other accused individuals. Both Dominican experts and Brazilian witnesses were unaware of the alleged bribes, further weakening the future of the case in the country.

On 29 June 2021, the Public Prosecutor's Office arrested Jean Alain Rodríguez in the so-called Operation Medusa, accusing him of numerous charges, including: criminal association, bribery, embezzlement, collusion of officials, political financing, and illicit enrichment. This arrest further raised doubts about the impartiality of the accusation presented by the Public Prosecutor's Office, which was led by Jean Alain from 2016 to 2020, against the defendants in the Odebrecht case.

=== Final verdicts, appeals and acquittals ===
On 14 October 2021, the First Collegiate Court of the National District acquitted four of the six implicated individuals, while Díaz Rúa and Ángel Rondón were sentenced to 5 and 8 years in prison, respectively. Both declared their innocence and announced their intention to appeal the verdict. At that time, several lawyers, particularly those representing the convicted, questioned the ruling.

In the case of Víctor Díaz Rúa, the sentence acquitted him of charges related to the Odebrecht case, as no evidence of bribery or overvaluation in the works constructed during his tenure at the Ministry of Public Works was found. However, he was convicted of money laundering for allegedly failing to submit a sworn asset declaration upon leaving the Ministry in 2012. Díaz Rúa claimed that the conviction was illegal, as he had provided all the evidence demonstrating the origin of his assets.

In the case of Ángel Rondón, he received an atypical conviction by being sentenced for bribery despite there being no evidence of any actual bribery.

On 19 May 2023, an Appeals Court upheld the conviction. However, Judge Daniel Nolasco issued a dissenting opinion, arguing that the judges who supported the decision should not have upheld the conviction due to the weakness of the evidence, and suggested that the defendants would be acquitted if they appealed the decision:

"In light of all the flaws identified in the contested ruling on appeal, the judges in this appellate jurisdiction should never have upheld such a decision, particularly regarding the citizen Víctor José Díaz Rúa, whose punitive conviction constitutes a judicial act that violates the minimum guarantees of constitutional due process."

"Thus, in order to overturn this legal absurdity, the dissenting opinion issued on this occasion is justified both in law and in the proper administration of justice. The appropriate solution in this case would have been to issue a full acquittal or, alternatively, to nullify the criminal case against the said defendant, in accordance with Article 69, numeral 5, of the Constitution of the Republic, which would imply an absolute release from criminal responsibility."

=== Conclusion of the case ===
On 9 August 2024, the Supreme Court of Justice acquitted Ángel Rondón Rijo and Víctor Díaz Rúa, declaring them innocent and ordering the cessation of all coercive measures against them. Additionally, the Court ordered the return of all seized assets, the lifting of any opposition, restrictions, and asset freezes, as well as the cancellation of registrations or oppositions and any precautionary measures. It also ordered the restitution of all assets affected during the process.

With the acquittal by the Supreme Court of Justice, the Odebrecht case concludes in the Dominican Republic without any individuals being identified as responsible for the alleged bribes admitted by Odebrecht in 2016.

== See also ==
- Odebrecht–Car Wash leniency agreement
- Offshoots of Operation Car Wash outside Brazil
