= Rafael Calventi =

Dominican architect and diplomat

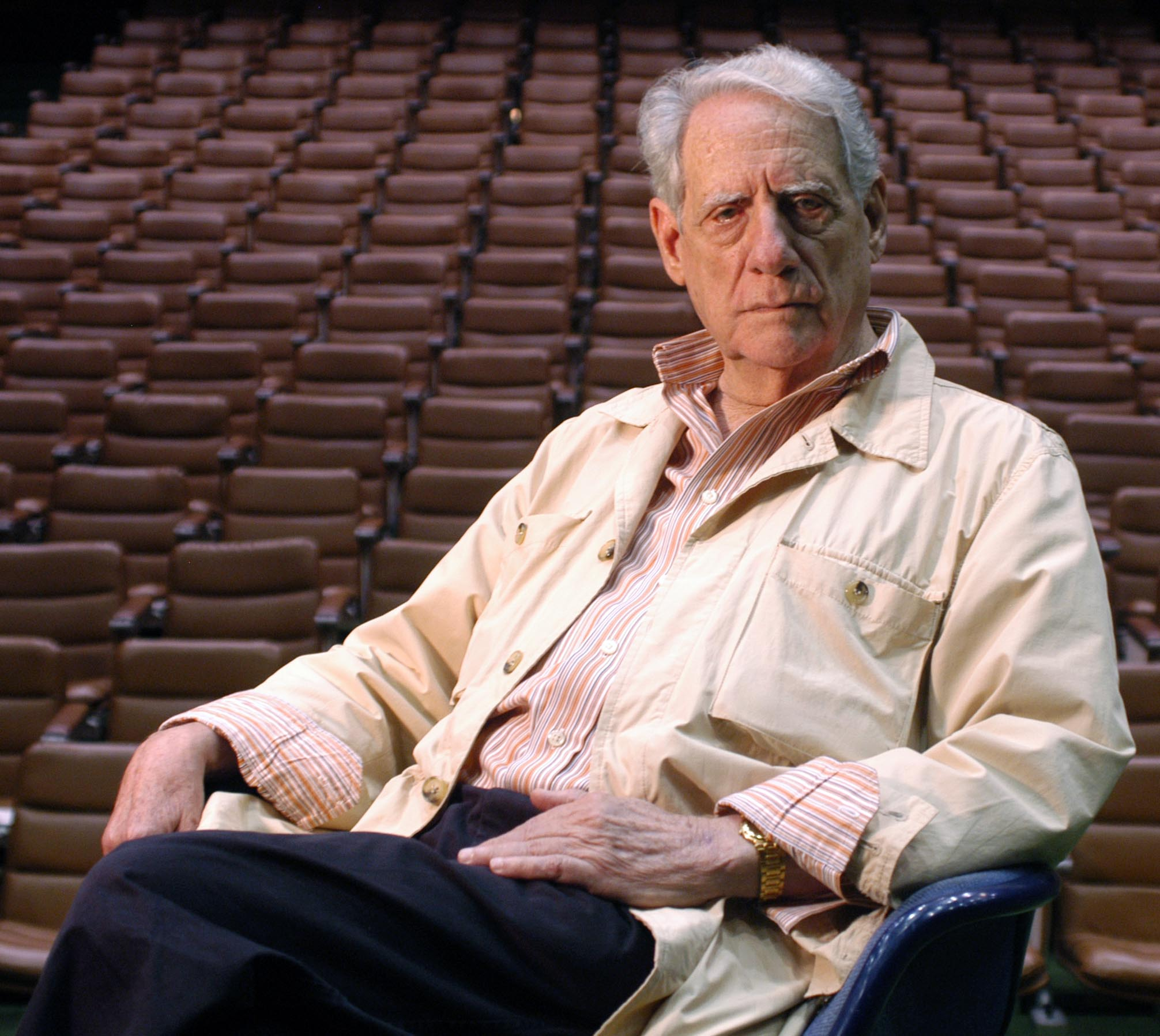

Ambassador of the Dominican Republic to Germany
- In office 20 March 2009 – 19 August 2018
- President: Leonel Fernández, Danilo Medina
- Preceded by: Pedro Vergés
- Succeeded by: Maybé Sánchez de Calventi

Personal details
- Born: Rafael Calventi Gaviño; 18 March 1932 La Vega, Dominican Republic
- Died: 19 August 2018 (aged 86) Berlin, Germany
- Spouse: Maybé Sánchez Caminero
- Children: 3 children and 4 stepchildren (including Jean Alain Rodríguez Sánchez)
- Relatives: Idelisa Bonnelly (sister-in-law); Juan Bosch (cousin); Milagros Ortiz Bosch (cousin-niece)
- Occupation: Architect, diplomat
- Awards: Order of Merit of the Italian Republic; Order of the Liberator General San Martin

Rafael Calventi Gaviño (18 March 1932 – 19 August 2018) was a Dominican architect and diplomat.

== Early life ==
Calventi was born in La Vega, Dominican Republic, to Juana Cintrón Gaviño (her father was a Galician colonist in Puerto Rico) and Arturo Calventi Suárez (1883–1968), both Puerto Rican immigrants.

Calventi studied at the Sapienza University of Rome, Italy, where he was a pupil of Pier Luigi Nervi and obtained the title of Doctor of Architecture. After his graduation he worked in the studios of Marcel Breuer and I.M. Pei in New York and Pierre Dufau in Paris. He is considered to have been a representative architect of the modernist movement in Latin America.

== Career ==
In 1962 Calventi began his professional practice in Santo Domingo, Dominican Republic, standing out as a designer and educator, with the axis of a group of young architects. In addition, he joined the University Renewal Movement (1965), composed of professors, students, and employees of the University of Santo Domingo, which managed to modernize the academic standards of the institution and democratize access to higher education in the Dominican Republic. Following this the School of Architecture was created from the Autonomous University of Santo Domingo and he became its first director, between 1966 and 1968. There he was a professor of Architectural Composition and Theory of Architecture. He was also one of the founders of the Technological Institute of Santo Domingo (INTEC) in the 1972. Foremost in reknowb among Calventi's completed structures is the headquarters for Banco Central de Reublica Dominicana in Santo Domingo which was realized in 1978. The building has been described as belonging to the Brutalism genre of architectural design.

In the public service sector he served as Deputy Director of the Office of the National District of Urban Planning and Design Chief of the Directorate of Buildings in the Ministry of Public Works and Communications of the Dominican Republic (SEOPEC). In 2005 he received a Special Tribute for his life's work from the Dominican Chamber of Construction. In 1997 he was a member of the National Commission on Urban Affairs of the Dominican Republic (CONAU) and was also a member of the Executive Committee of Cultural Heritage of the Dominican Republic. He was a member of the French Academy of Architecture and of the Dominican College Engineers, Architects and Surveyors (CODIA).

== Diplomat ==
In 1996 Calventi joined the Dominican diplomatic corps and thereafter served as the Dominican ambassador to Italy, Mexico, Argentina and lastly Germany. In Rome he was permanent representative of the Dominican Government to the United Nations World Food Programme (WFP) and the United Nations Food and Agriculture Organization (FAO); Dominican Government Delegate to the Italo-Latin American Institute (ILAI). In 2000 he received the Knight Grand Cross of the Order of Merit of the Republic of Italy. In Argentina in 2009 he was awarded the Order of the Liberator San Martin, Grand Cross.
