= Yeni Berenice Reynoso =

Dominican lawyer and career prosecutor (born 1982)

Attorney General of the Republic
- Incumbent
- Assumed office 24 February 2025
- Appointed by: National Council of the Magistracy
- Preceded by: Miriam Germán Brito

Personal details
- Born: 25 October 1982 (age 44) Luperón, Puerto Plata, Dominican Republic
- Education: Universidad Tecnológica de Santiago (LLB); Pontificia Universidad Católica Madre y Maestra (LLM)
- Profession: Lawyer, Prosecutor

Yeni Berenice Reynoso Gómez (born 25 October 1982) is a Dominican lawyer and career prosecutor who currently serves as the Attorney General of the Dominican Republic. She took office on 24 February 2025, becoming the first Attorney General appointed by the National Council of the Magistracy following the 2024 constitutional reforms.

Prior to her appointment as Attorney General, she served as the General Director of Persecution of the Public Ministry (2020–2025) and as the District Attorney of the National District (2011–2018). She is known for her role in high-profile anti-corruption investigations and institutional reforms within the Dominican justice system.

== Education ==
Reynoso holds a Law degree from the Universidad Tecnológica de Santiago (UTESA), graduating in 2002. She earned a master's degree in Penal Sciences from the Pontificia Universidad Católica Madre y Maestra (PUCMM), where she presented a thesis titled "Organized Crime as a Parallel Power: Challenges for the Dominican Justice System."

She also holds a master's degree in State Administration Law with a dual degree from the Instituto Global de Altos Estudios en Ciencias Sociales (IGLOBAL) and the University of Salamanca in Spain.

Her specialized training includes:

- Specialization in Procedural and Constitutional Law from the National University of Costa Rica.
- Investigation and Leadership training at the International Law Enforcement Academy (ILEA).
- Specialization in Criminal Law and Criminal Procedure from the National School of the Public Ministry and Universidad APEC.
- Specialized training in feminicide investigation from the Spanish Cooperation Center in Antigua Guatemala.
- In 2025, she was pursuing a doctorate in National and Human Security at the National Defense University (UNADE).

== Career ==
=== Early Career and Prosecutor of Santiago ===
Reynoso began her career in the judicial system at age 17 as a legal volunteer in Santiago de los Caballeros. In 2009, she became the first woman and the youngest person in history to be appointed as the District Attorney (Procuradora Fiscal) of Santiago, the country's second-largest province.

=== District Attorney of the National District ===
In 2011, she was appointed District Attorney of the National District (Santo Domingo), a position she held until 2018. During her tenure, she prosecuted several high-profile cases involving corruption, money laundering, and gender violence.

=== Director of Persecution ===
In August 2020, she was appointed Deputy Attorney General and Director of Persecution by the Superior Council of the Public Ministry, under the administration of Attorney General Miriam Germán Brito. In this role, she led major anti-corruption operations, including "Operación Antipulpo" and "Operación Medusa," which targeted former high-ranking government officials.

=== Attorney General ===
On 21 February 2025, the National Council of the Magistracy unanimously selected Reynoso as the Attorney General of the Dominican Republic. Her candidacy was proposed by President Luis Abinader. She is the first Attorney General selected under the 2024 Constitutional Reform, which removed the power of direct appointment by decree from the President to ensure greater independence of the Public Ministry. She was sworn in on 24 February 2025.

== Recognitions ==
Reynoso has received multiple awards for her work in the justice sector:

- 2025: Recognition by the U.S. Marshals Service for her collaboration in public safety.
- 2024: Recognition by United States Homeland Security Investigations for her role in Operation Icarus.
- 2022: Integrity and Anti-Corruption Award, granted by the civil society organization Participación Ciudadana (local chapter of Transparency International).
- 2013: "Woman of Courage" Award, granted by the United States Department of State through its embassy in Santo Domingo.
- 2011: Grand National Quality Prize, awarded by the Ministry of Public Administration to the Santiago Prosecutor's Office under her leadership.
