= Attorney General of the Republic =

Dominican government agency

Office of the Attorney General of the Republic
- Procuraduría General de la República (Spanish); Ministerio Público (Spanish); PGR
- Coat of arms of the Dominican Republic

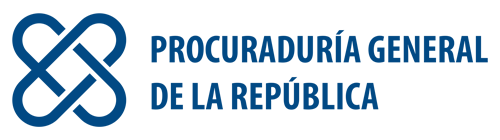
- Current logo

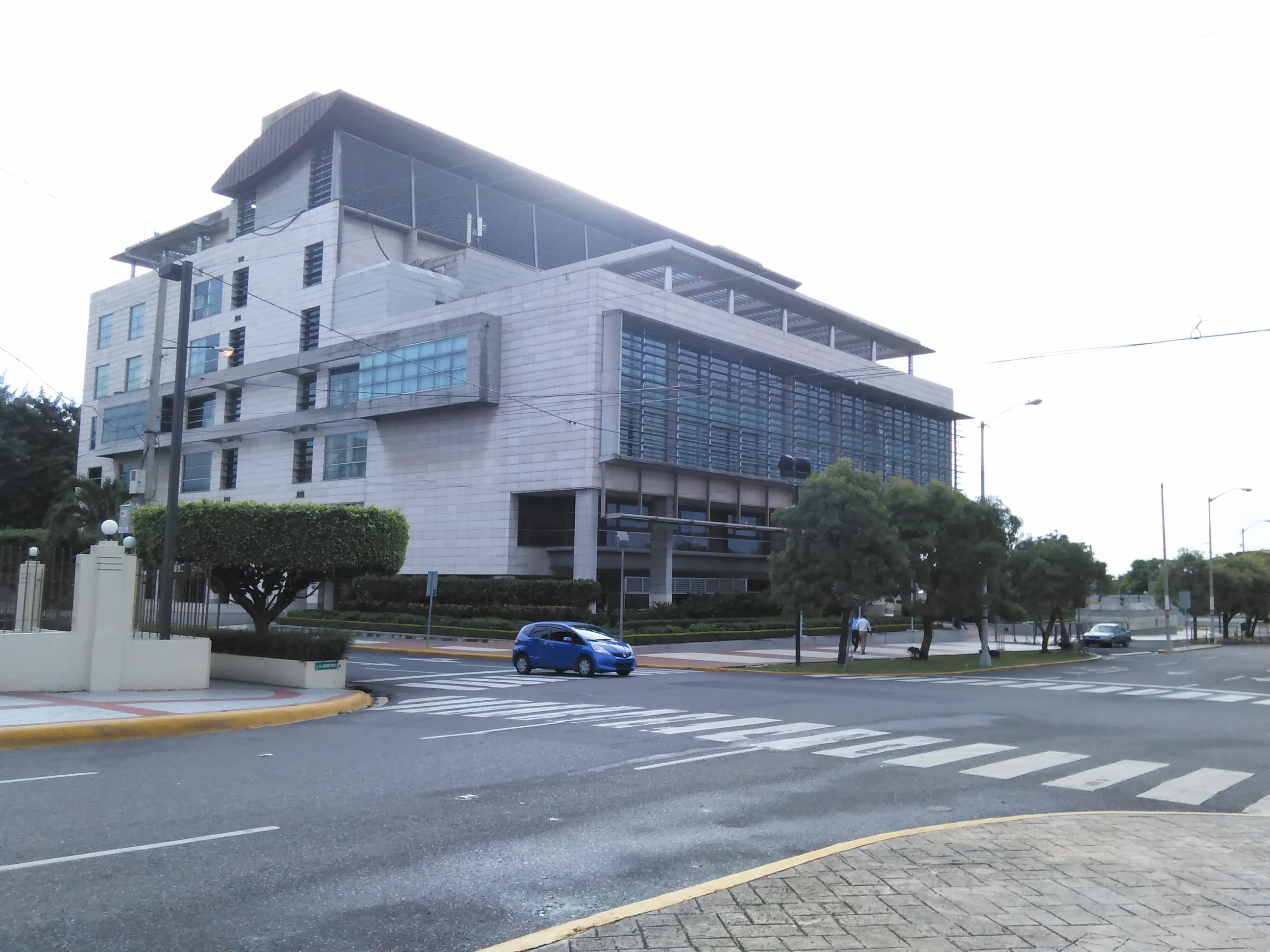
- Attorney General’s Office of the Republic (2018)

Agency overview
- Formed: November 6, 1844; 182 years ago
- Jurisdiction: Dominican Republic
- Headquarters: Centro de Los Heroes, Santo Domingo
- Annual budget: RD$9,286,898,720.00 billion (FY 2026); RD$10,566,729,557.74 (2021)
- Minister responsible: Yeni Berenice Reynoso, Attorney General of the Republic
- Deputy Minister responsible: Betania Rosa Rubio, Deputy Attorney General of the Dominican Republic
- Website: pgr.gob.do (in Spanish)

The Office of the Attorney General of the Republic (Spanish: Procuraduría General de la República) of the Dominican Republic is a government institution belonging to the executive branch that is responsible for representing the Dominican State in courts of law, defending public interest, assuring respect for the due process of law and overseeing penitentiaries in the Republic.

It was established on the 1844 Dominican Constitution as the Secretary of State of Justice and Public Instruction (Secretaría de Estado de Justicia e Instrucción Pública). Its headquarters are located at Santo Domingo, at the Centro de los Héroes, near the Supreme Court and the Congress of the Dominican Republic. Since February 21, 2025, the Attorney General is Yeni Berenice Reynoso.

It is analogous to Departments of Justice or Ministries of Justice in other countries.

== History ==
The origin of this Ministry can be found on the first Dominican Constitution, signed on November 6, 1844. This document specified that:

There will be four Ministers-Secretaries of State and of the following Departments: first, of Justice and Public Instruction; second, of the Interior and Police; third, of Finance and Trade; fourth of War and Navy.

— Constituent Assembly, Constitution of San Cristóbal, Title III, Chapter II, Section II, Art. 109

Thus, it was established the Secretary of State of Justice and Public Instruction (Secretaría de Estado de Justicia e Instrucción Pública) as the regulatory office of the judiciary activity and as the nexus between the president and the Supreme Court, established on Art. 31 of the same code of law.

The following year, on June 11, 1845, the Law no. 41 determined the role of the Attorney General. Initially, this position would be the link between the Secretary of Justice and the Supreme Court.

In 1931, the Secretary was suppressed and its functions on the matter of justice were transferred to the Office of the Attorney General (Procuraduría General de la República). In 1934, the Secretary of State of Justice was reestablished, at the same as the creation of the Secretary of State of Education and Fine Arts taking the functions in the matter of public instruction. During the 1950s, the office was given roles on the subject of labour, being temporarily named Secretary of State of Justice and Labour.

On November 10, 1964, by the Law no. 485, the Secretary of State of Justice was permanently abolished and all its functions were transferred to the Office of the Attorney General.

== Affiliated institutions ==
The Office of the Attorney General has a number of agencies that work alongside it to improve the judiciary system of the Dominican Republic. These are:

- Attorney's offices from several municipalities
- Specialized Attorney's Offices on:
  - Prosecution against money laundering
  - Arms control and trafficking
  - Persecution of administrative corruption
  - Illicit traffic of migrants and human trade
  - Environmental defense and natural resources
  - High technology crimes and felonies
  - Crimes and felonies against health
  - Electronic system
- General offices:
  - Victim Attention
  - Penitentiary and Reformatory Services
  - Children, Teenagers and Families
  - Investigation on Financial Crimes
  - Gender Violence
- Schools:
  - Penitentiary National School (ENAP)
  - Public Ministry National School
- National System for Conflict Resolution
- Legal Representation System on Victims' Rights (RELEVIC)
- National Institute of Forensics (INACIF)

== List of the Attorneys General of the Republic ==
- Jose Manuel Machado (1961)
- Porfirio Nestor Basora Puello (1961-1962)
- Eduardo Antonio García Vásquez (1962-1963)
- Osvaldo B. Soto (1963)
- Manuel Rafael García Lizardo (1963-1964)
- Fernando A. Chalas Valdez (1964-1965)
- Manuel Ramón Morel Cerda (1965)
- Gustavo Gómez Ceara (1965-1966)
- Manuel Rafael García Lizardo (1966-1968)
- Carlos Rafael Goico Morales (1968-1969)
- Anaiboní Guerrero Báez (1970)
- Marino Ariza Hernandez (1970)
- Antonio Grullón Chavez (1971)
- Juan Arístides Taveras Guzmán (1971-1973)
- Fabio Fiallo Cáceres (1973-1975)
- Miguel Angel Luna Morales (1976-1978)
- Alfredo Victoria (1978-1979)
- Flavio Darío Espinal Hued (1979)
- Bienvenido Mejía y Mejía (1979-1982)
- Antonio Rosario (1982-1984)
- Americo Espinal Hued (1984-1986)
- Julio César Castaño Espaillat (1986)
- Ramón González Hardy (1986-1987)
- Pura Luz Núñez Pérez (1987-1988) [1st female]
- Semiramis Olivo de Pichardo (1988-1990) [2nd female]
- Manuel García Lizardo (1991-1992)
- Efraim Reyes Dulac (1992-1995)
- Juan Demostones Cotes Morales (1995)
- Luis Nelson Pantaleón González (1995-1996)
- Ramón Pina Acevedo (1996)
- Abel Rodriguez del Orbe (1996-1998)
- Mariano Mejia (1998-1999)
- Virgilio Bello Rosa (2000-2003)
- Víctor Céspedes Martínez (2003-2004)
- Francisco Domínguez Brito (2004-2006)
- Radhamés Jiménez (2006-2012)
- Francisco Domínguez Brito (2012-2016)
- Jean Alain Rodríguez Sánchez (2016-2020)
- Miriam Germán Brito (2020–2025) [3rd female]
- Yeni Berenice Reynoso (2025- present)

== See also ==
- Justice minister
- Politics of the Dominican Republic
