= Idelisa Bonnelly =

Dominican marine biologist (1931–2022)

- Born: Idelisa Bonnelly Peralta; 10 September 1931; Santiago de los Caballeros, Dominican Republic
- Died: 3 July 2022 (aged 90)
- Spouse: Vinicio Calventi Gaviño
- Relatives: Rafael Calventi Gaviño (brother-in-law); Arambilet (nephew-in-law); Rafael F. Bonnelly (second-cousin once-removed); Sully Bonnelly (third cousin-once removed)

Academic background
- Education: Columbia University; New York University

Academic work
- Institutions: Universidad Autónoma de Santo Domingo; Research Center of Marine Biology; Dominican Foundation for Marine Research
- Main interests: Marine biologist
- Notable works: Created the first sanctuary for humpback whales

Idelisa Bonnelly de Calventi (10 September 1931 – 3 July 2022) was a Dominican marine biologist who is considered the "mother of marine conservation in the Caribbean". She was the founder of the study of biology in the Dominican Republic, as well as the founder of the Institute of Marine Biology and the Dominican Foundation for Marine Research. She was instrumental in the creation of the first Humpback Whale Sanctuary of the North Atlantic and has won numerous awards, including induction into the UNEP's Global 500 Roll of Honour, UNESCO's Marie Curie Medal and the Order of Merit of Duarte, Sánchez and Mella. The BBC has called her one of the most important women scientists in Latin America.

== Biography ==
Idelisa Bonnelly Peralta was born on 10 September 1931 in Santiago de los Caballeros, Dominican Republic. As she wanted to study marine biology and there were no schools teaching biology in the Dominican Republic, she pursued her university studies in New York. In 1953, she enrolled at Columbia University, graduating with a BS in marine biology in 1956. She went on to attain a master's degree from New York University in 1961. After completion of her schooling, Bonnelly began her first job at the New York Aquarium as a research assistant to Ross Nigrelli.

In 1962, she returned to the Dominican Republic and began teaching at the Universidad Autónoma de Santo Domingo (UASD), founding the first institution for the study of biology in the country. In 1966, she founded the Institute of Marine Biology, which later became the Research Center of Marine Biology (Spanish: Centro de Investigación de Biología Marina), at which she taught from 1967 to 1986 and then until 1992 served as the coordinator of graduate studies.

In 1974, Bonnelly founded the Academy of Sciences of the Dominican Republic and began publishing works which became widely influential for those managing and concerned with conservation of marine resources. In 1986, she was instrumental in the creation of the first protected area for the humpback whale, originally called the Humpback Whale Sanctuary on the Silver Bank (Spanish: Santuario de Ballenas Jorobadas del Banco de la Plata) but today known as Santuario de los Bancos de la Plata y la Navidad. For her contributions, she was awarded the Medal of Merit of Dominican Women in Science by the Government of the Dominican Republic (1986), the National Science Prize from the Academy of Sciences of the Dominican Republic (1987), and was inducted into the Global 500 Roll of Honour by the United Nations Environment Programme (UNEP) in 1987.

She became a Professor Meritorious at (UASD) in 1990 and in 1991 she created the Dominican Foundation for Marine Research (Spanish: Fundación Dominicana de Estudios Marinos) (FUNDEMAR), an institution which coordinates the marine management plan, studies marine life and the coral reef, and manages the Marine Mammal Sanctuary. That same year, Bonnelly joined the Organization for Women in Science for the Developing World (OWSD) and served in the First General Assembly. She continued publishing and her works have been utilized for influencing marine and coastal Environmental Law. Bonnelly was made an academic laureate of the Academy of Sciences in 2007, received a National Ecology Award from the Fundación Corripio in 2008, and was awarded the Marie Curie Medal from UNESCO in 2009.

In 2010, the Society for the Conservation of Biology of Victoria, British Columbia, Canada, honored her with a Distinguished Service Award in Biology and in 2011, the Government of the Dominican Republic granted her the Order of Merit of Duarte, Sánchez and Mella. In 2013, she was recognized by the BBC as one of the ten most important women scientists in Latin America.

== Death ==
Idelisa Bonnelly died on 3 July 2022 at the age of 90.

Ancestors of Idelisa Bonnelly

16. (France) Pierre Bonnelly
8. (United States Virgin Islands) José Arístides Bonnelly Coutín
17. (France) Marie-Lucette Coutin
4. (Dominican Republic) Pedro Arístides Bonnelly Camaré
18. (Dominican Republic) Alejandro Camaré Coiscou
9. (Dominican Republic) Alejandrina Camaré Osorio
19. (Dominican Republic) Martha Osorio Ruiz
2. (Dominican Republic) Miguel Rafael Bonnelly García (1898–1986)
5. (Dominican Republic) Rafaela García Valdez
1. Idelisa Bonnelly Peralta (born 1931)
6. (Dominican Republic) Elías Peralta Gove
3. (Dominican Republic) Victoria Peralta Mañé (1899–1995)
7. (Dominican Republic) Elvira Mañé Casado

== Awards ==
- 1986 Medal of Merit for Women in Science, Government of the Dominican Republic
- 1987 National Science Prize, Academy of Sciences of the Dominican Republic
- 1987 Global 500 Roll of Honour, United Nations Environment Programme (UNEP)
- 1990 Meritorious professor Autonomous University of Santo Domingo
- 2007 Academic Laureate Academy of Sciences of the Dominican Republic
- 2008 National Ecology Award, Fundación Corripio
- 2009 Marie Curie Medal, UNESCO
- 2010 Distinguished Service Award in Biology (SCB), Society for the Conservation of Biology, Victoria, Canada, 2010
- 2011 Order of Merit of Duarte, Sánchez and Mella, Government of the Dominican Republic

≠

== Partial list of publications ==
- Bonnelly de Calventi, Idelisa (1974). Informe Sobre la Pesca en la Republica Dominicana (in Spanish). Santo Domingo, Dominican Republic: Centro de Investigaciones de Biologia Marina, Universidad Autónoma de Santo Domingo.
- Bonnelly de Calventi, Idelisa (1974). Estudios de biología pesquera dominicana (in Spanish). Santo Domingo, Dominican Republic: Editora de la Universidad Autónoma de Santo Domingo.
- Bonnelly de Calventi, Idelisa (1974). La investigación pesquera y sus proyecciones (in Spanish). Santo Domingo, Dominican Republic: Universidad Autónoma de Santo Domingo.
- Bonnelly de Calventi, Idelisa (1978). Conservación y ecodesarrollo (in Spanish). Santo Domingo, Dominican Republic: Centro de Investigaciones de Biología Marina, Universidad Autónoma de Santo Domingo.
- Bonnelly de Calventi, Idelisa; Vásquez Tineo, Manuel; Terrero, David (1985). Informe, aspectos químicos y usos nativos de plantas en la medicina folklórica dominicana : estudio bibliográfico (in Spanish). Santo Domingo, Dominican Republic: Centro de Investigaciones de Biología Marina, Universidad Autónoma de Santo Domingo. OCLC 20360333.
- Bonnelly de Calventi, Idelisa (1994). Mamiferos marinos en la República Dominicana (in Spanish). Santo Domingo, Dominican Republic.

== See also ==
- Timeline of women in science
