= Pontificia Universidad Católica Madre y Maestra =

Dominican private university

Mother and Teacher Pontifical Catholic University
- Pontificia Universidad Católica Madre y Maestra
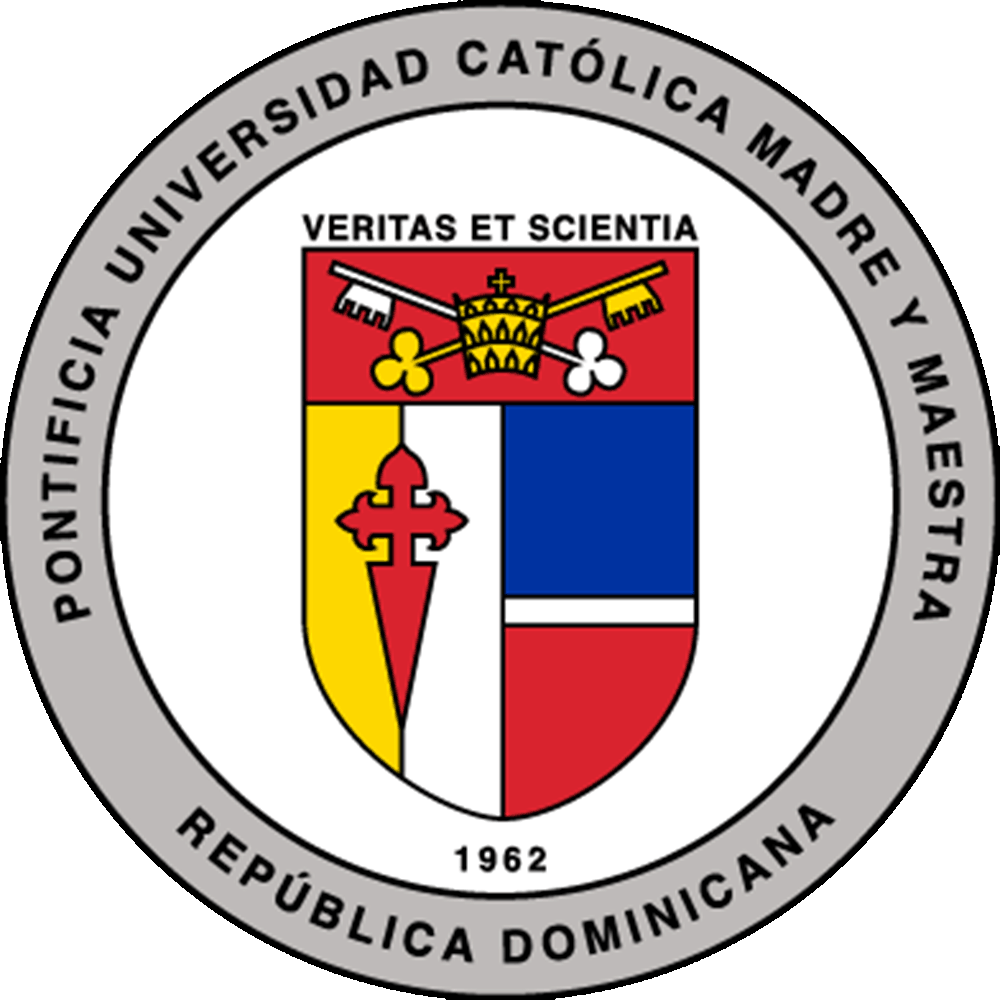
- Motto: Veritas et Scientia (Latin)
- Motto in English: Truth and Science
- Type: Private, Roman Catholic, Coed
- Established: 9 September 1962; 63 years ago
- Affiliations: Pontifical Universities, International Council of Universities of Saint Thomas Aquinas
- President: Secilio Espinal Espinal
- Students: 16,000
- Location: Campuses are in Santiago de los Caballeros, Santo Domingo, and Puerto Plata, Dominican Republic
- Campus: Santiago Campus, Suburban, 1.2 km^{2}; Santo Tomás de Aquino Campus, Urban, 14000 m^{2}; Puerto Plata campus Urban
- Colors: Blue, Red and Yellow
- Website: www.pucmm.edu.do

Pontificia Universidad Católica Madre y Maestra (English: Pontifical Catholic University Madre y Maestra) or PUCMM is a private, coeducational Roman Catholic university in the Dominican Republic. The university grants undergraduate, graduate, doctoral and professional degrees. It has three campuses: one in Santiago de los Caballeros, another in Santo Domingo and an extension in Puerto Plata.

== History ==
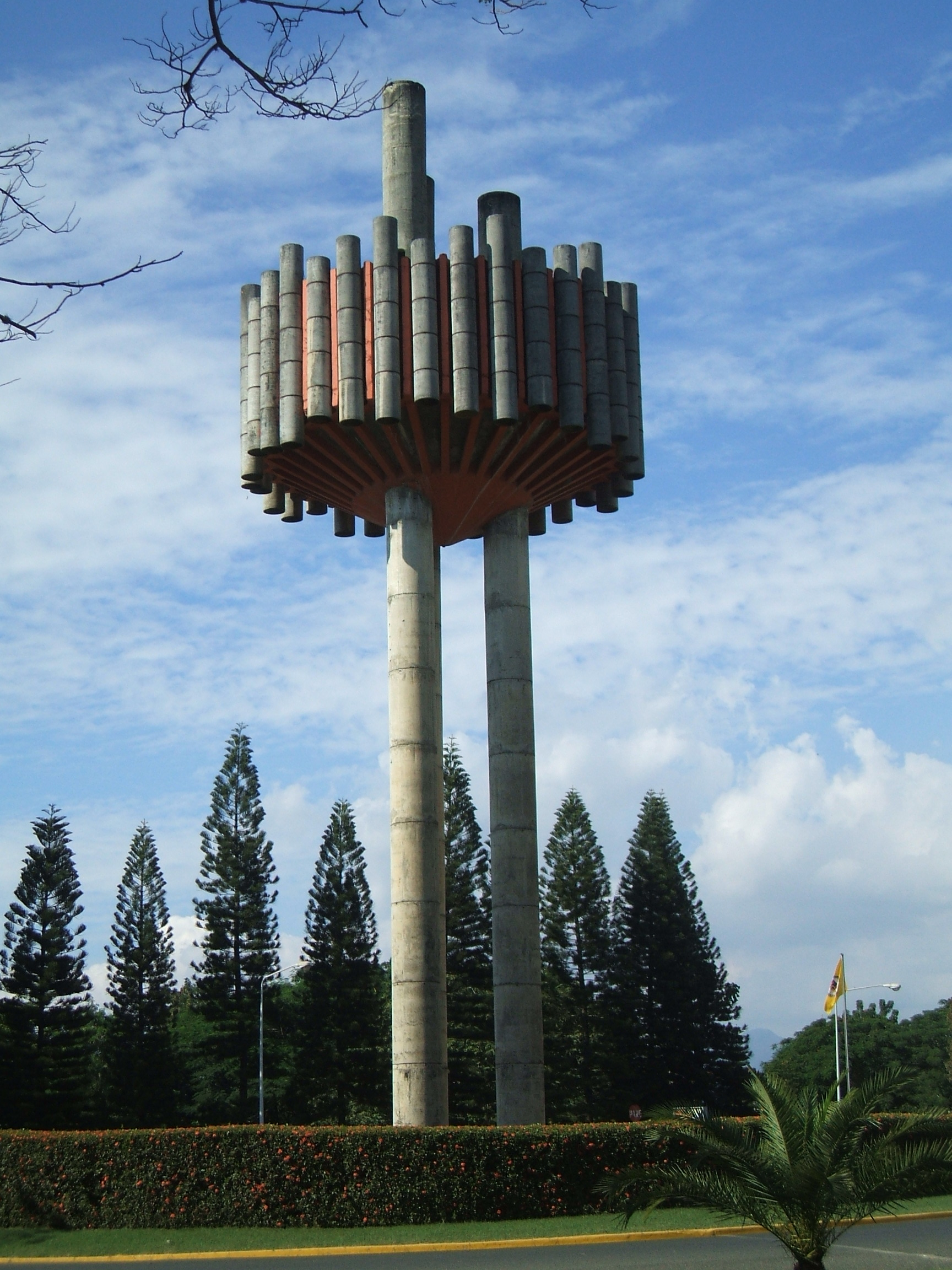
The water tower on the campus of Santiago has become a symbol of the university.

The university is named after Pope John XXIII's encyclical Mater et Magistra, meaning mother and teacher in Latin. At first, PUCMM offered faculties in law, education, and philosophy. Its recognition by the Dominican government came through Law 6150 on 31 December 1962. In 1991, the institution was delegated with the responsibility for country domain registration.

== Rankings ==
PUCMM made the list of Quacquarelli Symonds' top Latin American universities in 2012. It was ranked #1201-1400 globally in 2025 QS World University Rankings and #161-170 out of the top 250 universities in Latin America and 5th on the Caribbean. In 2023, the university received a ranking of two Palmes, representing a good business school with a regional influence.

== Divisions ==
- Faculty of Social Sciences, Humanities, and Arts
  - School of Architecture and Design
  - School of Communications
  - School of Law
  - School of Education
  - School of Humanities and Social Sciences
  - School of Languages
  - School of Psychology
  - School of Theology
  - Department of General Studies
- Faculty of Economic and Administrative Sciences
- Faculty of Science and Engineering
  - Civil Engineering
  - Mechanical Engineering
  - Electrical Engineering
  - Industrial Engineering
  - Systems Engineering
  - Mechatronics
  - Computer Science
  - Network Engineering
  - Environmental Engineering
- Faculty of Health Sciences
  - Oral Medicine
  - Medicine
  - Nutrition and Dietetics
  - Physical Therapy

== See also ==
- Mater et Magistra
