= Cabinet of the Dominican Republic =

Executive government body in the Dominican Republic

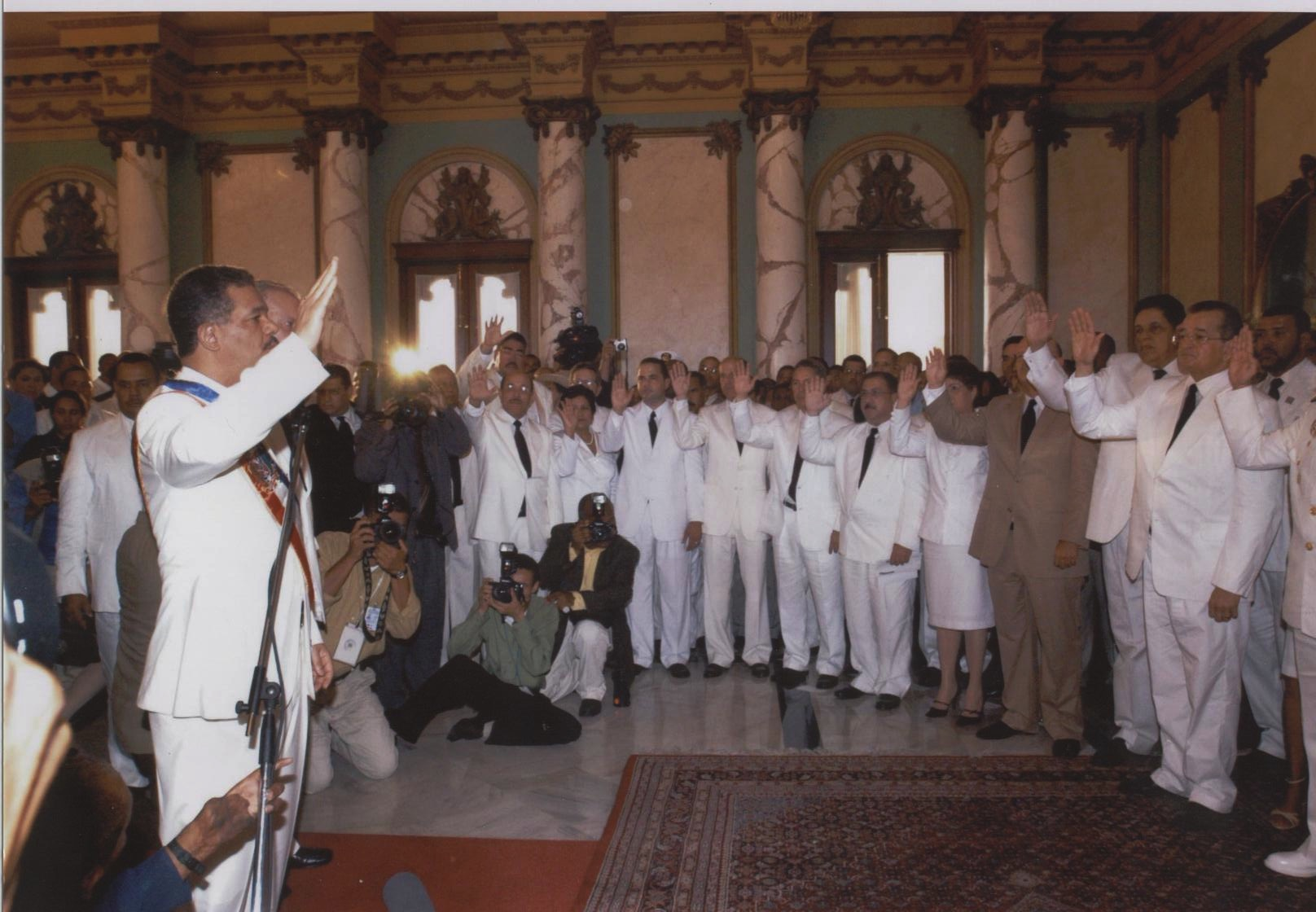
Leonel Fernández’s first government cabinet sworn in for the 2004–2008 term at the National Palace

The Cabinet of the Dominican Republic is nominated and selected by the President of the Dominican Republic and may be removed by the President at any time. Its members head the ministries and other key government offices. The Cabinet is responsible for assisting the president in his duty to govern the nation.

The Ministries of the Dominican Republic were known as "Secretariats of State" until the issuance of decree No. 56-10 on February 8, 2010, and the promulgation of the Constitution of the Dominican Republic. These acts changed the designation "Secretariat of State" to "Ministry," and established that the individuals in charge of these portfolios would henceforth be referred to as "ministers."

== Cabinet of Luis Abinader (2020–2028) ==
Upon taking office on August 16, 2020, President Luis Abinader appointed his Cabinet through decree No. 324-20. In August 2021, the Ministry of Housing, Habitat and Buildings was established, creating an additional ministerial position within the Cabinet. The Ministry of Justice was subsequently established in 2026, adding another ministerial position.

The following is a list of ministers who have served or are currently serving in President Abinader’s Cabinet:

Office	Image	Title	Officeholder	Assumed office	Ref.
Executive branch
President of the Dominican Republic (Spanish: Presidente/a de la República Dominicana)		President (Spanish: Presidente/a)	Luis Abinader (b. 1967)	16 August 2020	
Vice President of the Dominican Republic (Spanish: Vicepresidente/a de la República Dominicana)		Vice President (Spanish: Vicepresidente/a)	Raquel Peña (b. 1966)	16 August 2020	
Ministries
Ministerio de la Presidencia (MINPRE) (English: Ministry of the Presidency)		Minister of the Presidency (Spanish: Ministro/a de la Presidencia)	José Ignacio Paliza (b. 1981)	16 August 2024	
Ministerio Administrativo de la Presidencia (MAPRE) (English: Administrative Ministry of the Presidency)		Administrative Minister of the Presidency (Spanish: Ministro/a Administrativo de la Presidencia)	Andrés Bautista (b. 1964)	16 August 2024	
Ministerio de Administración Pública (MAP) (English: Ministry of Public Administration)		Minister of Public Administration (Spanish: Ministro/a de Administración Pública)	Sigmund Freund Mena		
Ministerio de Agricultura (MA) (English: Ministry of Agriculture)		Minister of Agriculture (Spanish: Ministro/a de Agricultura)	Francisco Oliverio Espaillat Bencosme		
Ministry of Culture (MINC) (Spanish: Ministerio de Cultura de la República Dominicana)		Minister of Culture (Spanish: Ministro/a de Cultura)	Roberto Salcedo Jr. (b. 1979)	26 February 2025	
Ministerio de Defensa de la República Dominicana (MIDE) (English: Ministry of Defense of the Dominican Republic)		Minister of Defense (Spanish: Ministro/a de Defensa)	Lieutenant general, ERD Carlos Antonio Fernández Onofre (b. 1962)	16 August 2024	
Ministerio de Deportes y Recreación (MIDEREC) (English: Ministry of Sports and Recreation of the Dominican Republic)		Minister of Sports and Recreation (Spanish: Ministro/a de Deportes y Recreación)	Kelvin Cruz (b. 1978)	16 August 2024	
Ministry of Education (MINERD) (Spanish: Ministerio de Educación de la República Dominicana)		Minister of Education (Spanish: Ministro/a de Educación)	Luis Miguel de Camps (b. 1979)	26 February 2025	
Ministry of Higher Education, Science and Technology (MESCyT) (Spanish: Ministerio de Educación Superior, Ciencia y Tecnología)		Minister of Higher Learning, Science and Technology (Spanish: Ministro/a de Educación Superior, Ciencia y Tecnología)	Rafael Santos Badía (b. 1953)	12 February 2026	
Ministry of Energy and Mines (MEM) (English: Ministry of Energy and Mines)		Minister of Energy and Mines (Spanish: Ministro/a de Energía y Minas)	Joel Santos (b. 1969)	16 August 2024	
Ministry of Finance and Economy (MHE) (Spanish: Ministerio de Hacienda y Economía de la República Dominicana)		Minister of Finance and Economy (Spanish: Ministro/a de Hacienda y Economía)	Magín Javier Díaz (b. 1972)	15 July 2025	
Ministry of Industry, Trade and MSMEs (MICM) (English: Ministerio de Industria, Comercio y Mipymes)		Minister of Industry, Trade and MSMEs (Spanish: Ministro/a de Industria, Comercio y Mipymes)	Eduardo Sanz Lovatón (b. 1977)	6 January 2026	
Ministerio de Interior y Policía (MIP) (English: Ministry of Interior and Police)		Minister of Interior and Police (Spanish: Ministro/a de Interior y Policía)	Faride Raful (b. 1979)		
Ministerio de la Juventud (MJ) (English: Ministry of Youth)		Minister of Youth (Spanish: Ministro/a de la Juventud)	Carlos Valdez Matos (b. 1991)		
Ministerio de Medio Ambiente y Recursos Naturales (MMARN) (English: Ministry of Environment and Natural Resources)		Minister of Environment and Natural Resources (Spanish: Ministro/a de Medio Ambiente y Recursos Naturales)	Armando Paíno Henríquez Dájer		
Ministerio de la Mujer (MMUJER) (Spanish: Ministry for Women)		Minister for Women (Spanish: Ministra de la Mujer)	Gloria Reyes (b. 1986)		
Ministerio de Obras Públicas y Comunicaciones (MOPC) (English: Ministry of Public Works and Communications)		Minister of Public Works and Communications (Spanish: Ministro/a de Obras Públicas y Comunicaciones)	Eduardo Estrella (b. 1953)		
Ministry of Foreign Affairs (MIREX) (Spanish: Ministerio de Relaciones Exteriores de la República Dominicana)		Minister of Foreign Affairs (Spanish: Ministro/a de Relaciones Exteriores)	Ito Bisonó (b. 1963)		
Ministerio de Salud Pública y Asistencia Social (MISPAS or MSP) (English: Ministry of Public Health and Social Assistance of the Dominican Republic)		Minister of Public Health and Social Assistance (Spanish: Ministro/a de Salud Pública y Asistencia Social)	Víctor Atallah (b. 1966)		
Ministerio de Trabajo (MT) (English: Ministry of Labor of the Dominican Republic)		Minister of Labour (Spanish: Ministro/a de Trabajo)	Eddy Olivares (b. 1964)	26 February 2025	
Ministerio de Turismo de la República Dominicana (MITUR) (English: Ministry of Tourism of the Dominican Republic)		Minister of Tourism (Spanish: Ministro/a de Turismo)	David Collado (b. 1975)	16 August 2020	
Ministerio de Vivienda y Edificaciones (MIVED) (English: Ministry of Housing and Buildings)		Minister of Housing and Buildings (Spanish: Ministro/a de Vivienda y Edificaciones)	Jean Luis Rodríguez	16 August 2026	
Ministerio de Justicia (MJ) (English: Ministry of Justice)		Minister of Justice (Spanish: Ministro/a de Justicia)	Antoliano Peralta (b. 1954)		
Attorney General of the Republic (PGR) (English: Procuraduría General de la República)		Attorney General of the Republic (Spanish: Procurador General de la República)	Yeni Berenice Reynoso (b. 1982)		
Note: Under Article 30 of Law No. 247-12, the President of the Dominican Republic may appoint up to three Ministers without Portfolio. These positions do not constitute separate ministries.
Minister of State without Portfolio (Spanish: Ministro/a de Estado sin Cartera)		Minister of State without Portfolio (Spanish: Ministro/a de Estado sin Cartera)	Neney Cabrera (b. 1966)	16 August 2020	
Minister of State without Portfolio (Spanish: Ministro/a de Estado sin Cartera)		Minister of State without Portfolio (Spanish: Ministro/a de Estado sin Cartera)	Roberto Fulcar Encarnación	3 August 2022	
Minister of State without Portfolio (Spanish: Ministro/a de Estado sin Cartera)		Minister of State without Portfolio (Spanish: Ministro/a de Estado sin Cartera)	Deligne Alberto Ascención Burgos	26 February 2025	
Institutes, directorates and public agencies
Presidential Spokesperson (Spanish: Vocero de la Presidencia); Dirección de Estrategia y Comunicación Gubernamental (DIECOM) (English: Directorate for Strategy and Government Communication		Presidential Spokesperson (Spanish: Vocero/a de la Presidencia); Director of the Directorate for Strategy and Government Communication (Spanish: Director/a de la Dirección de Estrategia y Comunicación Gubernamental)	Félix Reyna	16 August 2025	
Contraloría General de la República (CGRD or CGR) (English: Office of the Comptroller General of the Republic)		Comptroller General of the Office of the Comptroller General of the Republic (Spanish: Contralor General de Contraloría General de la República)	Geraldo Espinosa Pérez		
Central Bank of the Dominican Republic (BCRD) (Spanish: Banco Central de la República Dominicana)		Governor of the Central Bank (Spanish: Gobernador/a del Banco Central)	Héctor Valdez Albizu (b. 1947)	17 August 2004	
Banco de Reservas de la República Dominicana (Banreservas) (English: Reserve Bank of the Dominican Republic)		Executive President (Spanish: Presidente/a ejecutivo)	Leonardo Aguilera (b. 1950)		
Superintendencia de Seguros de la República Dominicana (SIS) (English: Superintendency of Insurance of the Dominican Republic)		Superintendency of Insurance of the Dominican Republic (Spanish: Superintendente de Bancos de la República Dominicana)	Julio César Valentín (b. 1966)		
Superintendencia de Bancos de la República Dominicana (SB) (English: Superintendency of Banks of the Dominican Republic)		Superintendent of Banks of the Dominican Republic (Spanish: Superintendente de Bancos de la República Dominicana)	Víctor Cedeño Brea		
Superintendencia del Mercado de Valores de la República Dominicana (SIMV) (English: Superintendency of the Securities Market of the Dominican Republic)		Superintendent of the Securities Market of the Dominican Republic (Spanish: Superintendente del Mercado de Valores de la República Dominicana)	Ernesto Bournigal Read		
Oficina Gubernamental de Tecnologías de la Información y Comunicación (OGTIC) (English: Government Office for Information and Communication Technologies)		Director General of Government Office for Information and Communication Technologies (Spanish: Director/a General de la Oficina Gubernamental de Tecnologías de la Información y Comunicación)	Edgar de Jesús Batista Carrasco		
Instituto Tecnológico de las Américas (ITLA) (English: Las Americas Institute of Technology)		Rector of Las Americas Institute of Technology (Spanish: Rector/a del Instituto Tecnológico de las Américas)	Jimmy Rosario Bernard		
Instituto Nacional de Formación Técnico Profesional (INFOTEP) (English: National Institute for Technical and Vocational Training)		Director General of the National Institute for Technical and Vocational Training (Spanish: Director/a General del Instituto Nacional de Formación Técnico Profesional)	Maira Margarita Morla Pineda		
Instituto Superior de Formación Docente Salome Ureña (ISFODOSU) (English: Salomé Ureña Higher Institute for Teacher Training)		Rector of the Salomé Ureña Higher Institute for Teacher Training (Spanish: Rector/a del Instituto Superior de Formación Docente Salome Ureña)	Dinorah García Romero		
Instituto Técnico Superior Comunitario (ITSC) (English: Community Higher Technical Institute)		Rector of the Community Higher Technical Institute (Spanish: Rector/a del Instituto Técnico Superior Comunitario)	José Ramón Holguín Brito		
Legal Counsel to the Executive Branch		Legal Counsel to the Executive Branch (Spanish: Consultor/a Jurídico del Poder Ejecutivo	Jorge Subero Isa (b. 1947)	5 January 2026	
Instituto Nacional de Tránsito y Transporte Terrestre (INTRANT) (English: National Institute of Transit and Land Transportation)		Executive Director of the National Institute of Transit and Land Transportation (Spanish: Director/a Ejecutivo/a del Instituto Nacional de Tránsito y Transporte Terrestre)	Juan Manuel Méndez (b. 1966)	3 August 2022	
Fideicomiso RD Vial (English: RD Vial Trust)		Director General of RD Vial Trust (Spanish: Director/a General del Fideicomiso RD Vial)	Hostos Rizik Lugo		
Dirección General de Pasaportes (DGP) (English: General Directorate of Passports)		Director General of General Directorate of Passports (Spanish: Director/a General de la Dirección General de Pasaportes)	Lorenzo David Ramírez Uribe		
Dirección General de Contrataciones Públicas (DGCP) (English: General Directorate of Public Procurement)		Director General of the General Directorate of Public Procurement (Spanish: Director/a General de la Dirección General de Contrataciones Públicas)	Carlos E. Pimentel Florenzán		
Instituto Dominicano de las Telecomunicaciones (INDOTEL) (English: Dominican Institute of Telecommunications)		President of the Board of Directors of the Dominican Institute of Telecommunications (Spanish: Presidente/a del Consejo Directivo del Instituto Dominicano de las Telecomunicaciones)	es:Guido Gómez (b. 1967)		
Instituto Azucarero Dominicano (INAZUCAR) (English: Dominican Sugar Institute)		Director of the Dominican Sugar Institute (Spanish: Director/a del Instituto Nacional de Tránsito y Transporte Terrestre)	Máximo Pérez Pérez		
Dirección General de Aduanas (DGA) (English: General Directorate of Customs)		Director General of General Directorate of Customs (Spanish: Director/a General de la Direccion General de Aduanas)	Nelson de Jesús Arroyo Perdomo	3 August 2022	
Dirección General de Proyectos Estratégicos y Especiales de la Presidencia (PROPEEP) (English: General Directorate for Strategic and Special Projects of the Presidency)		Director General of the General Directorate for Strategic and Special Projects of the Presidency (Spanish: Director/a General de la Dirección General de Proyectos Estratégicos y Especiales de la Presidencia)	Robert Darío Polanco Tejada		
Dirección General de Presupuesto (DIGEPRES) (English: General Directorate for General Directorate of the Budget)		Director of the General Directorate of the Budget (Spanish: Director/a de la Dirección General de Presupuesto)	José Rijo Presbot		
Dirección General de Catastro Nacional (DGCN) (English: General Directorate of Customs)		Director General of the National Cadastre (Spanish: Director/a General de la Dirección General de Catastro Nacional)	Héctor Pérez Mirambeaux	3 August 2022	
Dirección General de Impuestos Internos de la República Dominicana (DGII) (English: General Directorate of Internal Taxes of the Dominican Republic)		Director General of General Directorate of Internal Taxes of the Dominican Republic (Spanish: Director/a General de la Direccion General de Impuestos Internos)	Pedro Porfirio Urrutia Sangiovanni		
Dirección General de Cine de la República Dominicana (DGCINE) (English: General Directorate of Cinema)		Director General of General Directorate of Cinema (Spanish: Director/a General de la Dirección General de Cine)	Marianna Vargas Gurilieva		
Cámara de Cuentas de la República Dominicana (CCRD) (English: Chamber of Accounts of the Dominican Republic)		President of the Chamber of Accounts of the Dominican Republic (Spanish: Presidente/a de la Cámara de Cuentas de la República Dominicana)	Emma Polanco (b. 1950)		
Centro de Desarrollo y Competitividad Industrial (PROINDUSTRIA) (English: Center for Industrial Development and Competitiveness)		Director General of Center for Industrial Development and Competitiveness (Spanish: Director/a General de la Dirección General de Jubilaciones y Pensiones a Cargo del Estado)	Rafael Ulises Cruz Rodríguez		
Dirección General de Jubilaciones y Pensiones a Cargo del Estado (DGJP) (English: General Directorate of State-Funded Retirement and Pension Schemes)		Director General of General Directorate of State-Funded Retirement and Pension Schemes (Spanish: Director/a General de la Dirección General de Jubilaciones y Pensiones a Cargo del Estado)	Juan Rosa		
Dirección General de Ética e Integridad Gubernamental (DIGEIG) (English: General Directorate of Ethics and Government Integrity)		Director General of General Directorate of Ethics and Government Integrity (Spanish: Director/a General de la Dirección General de Ética e Integridad Gubernamental)	Milagros Ortiz Bosch (b. 1936)		
Dirección General de Medicamentos, Alimentos y Productos Sanitarios (DIGEMAPS) (English: General Directorate for Medicines, Food and Health Products)		Director General of General Directorate for Medicines, Food and Health Products (Spanish: Director/a General de la Dirección General de Medicamentos, Alimentos y Productos Sanitarios)	Marcos Balaguer Jerez		
Archivo General de la Nación de República Dominicana (AGN) (English: General Archive of the Nation of the Dominican Republic)		Director General of General Archive of the Nation (Spanish: Director/a General del Archivo General de la Nación)	Roberto Cassá (b. 1948)		
Refinería Dominicana de Petróleo, S.A. (Refidomsa) (English: Dominican Petroleum Refinery)		Chairman of the Board of Directors of Refidomsa (Spanish: Presidente/a del Consejo de Administración de Refidomsa)	Samuel Pereyra (b. 1976)	18 August 2025	
Empresa Metropolitana de Transporte, S.A. (EMT) (English: Metropolitan Transportation Company)		Executive Director of the Metropolitan Transportation Company (Spanish: Director/a Ejecutivo/a de la Empresa Metropolitana de Transporte)	Jhael Isa		
Defensa Civil de la República Dominicana (DC) (English: Civil Defense of the Dominican Republic)		Executive Director of the Civil Defense of the Dominican Republic (Spanish: Director/a Ejecutivo/a de la Defensa Civil de la República Dominicana)	Carlos Manuel Paulino Cárdenas		
Centro de Operaciones de Emergencias (COE) (English: Emergency Operations Center)		Director of Emergency Operations Center (Spanish: Director/a del Centro de Operaciones de Emergencias)	Erdwin Robert Olivares Luciano		
Autoridad Portuaria de la República Dominicana (APORDOM) (English: Dominican Port Authority)		Executive Director of the Dominican Port Authority (Spanish: Director/a Ejecutivo/a de la Autoridad Portuaria Dominicana)	Francisco Alejandro Campos Álvarez		
Instituto Nacional de Recursos Hidráulicos (INDRHI) (English: National Institute of Hydraulic Resources)		Executive Director of the National Institute of Hydraulic Resources (Spanish: Director/a Ejecutivo/a del Instituto Nacional de Recursos Hidráulicos)	Olmedo Caba Romano		
Operadora Metropolitana de Servicios de Autobuses (OMSA) (English: Metropolitan Bus Services Operator)		Administrator of the Metropolitan Bus Services Operator (Spanish: Administrador/a de la Operadora Metropolitana de Servicios de Autobuses)	Onéximo González		
Instituto Dominicano de Meteorología (INDOMET) (English: Dominican Institute of Meteorology)		Executive Director of the Dominican Institute of Meteorology (Spanish: Director/a Ejecutivo/a del Instituto Dominicano de Meteorología)	Gloria Ceballos (b. 1958)		
Edesur Dominicana, S.A. (Edesur (República Dominicana))		General Manager of Edesur Dominicana (Spanish: Gerente General de Edesur Dominicana)	José Luis Actis		
Empresa Distribuidora de Electricidad del Este, S.A. (EdeEste (República Dominicana))		General Manager of the Eastern Electricity Distribution Company (Spanish: Gerente General de la Empresa Distribuidora de Electricidad del Este)	Emilio Contreras		
Edenorte Dominicana, S.A. (Edenorte (República Dominicana))		General Manager of Edenorte Dominicana S.A. (Spanish: Gerente General de Edenorte Dominicana S.A.)	Gustavo Adolfo Martínez		
Sistema Nacional de Atencion a Emergencias y Seguridad (911) (English: National Emergency Response and Security System)		Executive Director of the National Emergency Response and Security System (Spanish: Director/a Ejecutivo/a del Sistema Nacional de Atencion a Emergencias y Seguridad)	Colonel Aircraft pilot, ERD Randolfo Rijo Gómez		
Instituto Dominicano de Aviación Civil (IDAC) (English: Dominican Institute of Civil Aviation)		Director General of the Dominican Institute of Civil Aviation (Spanish: Director/a General del Instituto Dominicano de Aviación Civil)	Igor David Rodríguez Durán		
Junta de Aviación Civil (JAC) (English: Civil Aviation Board)		President of the Civil Aviation Board (Spanish: Presidente/a de la Junta de Aviación Civil)	Julio Peña Guzmán	16 August 2026	
Lotería Nacional (LN) (English: National Lottery)		Director of National Lottery (Spanish: Director/a de la Lotería Nacional)	Teofilo Jose Abrahan Leon Tabar Manzur		
Seguro Nacional de Salud (SeNaSa) (English: National Health Insurance)		Executive Director of National Health Insurance (Spanish: Director/a Ejecutivo/a del Seguro Nacional de Salud)	Edward Guzmán		
Servicio Nacional de Salud (SNS) (English: National Health Service)		Executive Director of National Health Service (Spanish: Director/a Ejecutivo/a del Servicio Nacional de Salud)	Julio Landrón		
Corporación Estatal de Radio y Televisión (CERTV) (English: State Radio and Television Corporation)		Director General of State Radio and Television Corporation (Spanish: Director/a General de la Corporación Estatal de Radio y Televisión)	Iván Ruiz		
Consejo Estatal del Azúcar (República Dominicana) (CEA) (English: State Sugar Council)		Honorary Director of the State Sugar Council (Spanish: Director/a Honorifico/a del Consejo Estatal del Azúcar)	Rafael A. Burgos Gómez		
Tesorería Nacional de la República Dominicana (TN) (English: National Treasury of the Dominican Republic)		National Treasurer (Spanish: Tesorero/a Nacional)	Luis Rafael Delgado Sánchez		
National Statistics Office (ONE) (Spanish: Oficina Nacional de Estadística)		Director General of the National Statistics Office (Spanish: Director/a General de la Oficina Nacional de Estadística)	Mildred Martínez	27 May 2025	
National Institute of Price Stabilization (INESPRE) (Spanish: Instituto Nacional de Estabilización de Precios)		Executive Director of the National Institute of Price Stabilization (Spanish: Director/a Ejecutivo/a del Instituto Nacional de Estabilización de Precios)	David Herrera Díaz		
Dominican Postal Institute (INPOSDOM) (Spanish: Instituto Postal Dominicano)		Director General of INPOSDOM (Spanish: Director/a General del INPOSDOM)	Erick Alberto Guzmán Núñez	3 August 2022	
Departamento Aeroportuario (DA) (English: Airport Department)		Executive Director of the Airport Department (Spanish: Director/a del Departamento Aeroportuario)	Mérido de Jesús Torres Espinal		
Dirección de Servicios de Atención a Emergencias Extrahospitalarias (DAEH) (English: Directorate of Out-of-Hospital Emergency Care Services)		Director of the Directorate of Out-of-Hospital Emergency Care Services (Spanish: Director/a de la Dirección de Servicios de Atención a Emergencias Extrahospitalarias)	Juan Manuel Méndez (b. 1966)		
Tesorería de la Seguridad Social (TSS) (English: Social Security Treasury)		General Treasurer of the Social Security Treasury (Spanish: Tesorero/a de la Seguridad Social)	Henry Sahdalá Dumit		
Instituto Nacional de Atención Integral a la Primera Infancia (INAIPI) (English: National Institute for Comprehensive Early Childhood Care)		Executive Director of the National Institute for Comprehensive Early Childhood Care (Spanish: Director/a Ejecutivo/a del Instituto Nacional de Atención Integral a la Primera Infancia)	Kenia Xiomara Guante Valdez	16 August 2026	
Corporación del Acueducto y Alcantarillado de Santo Domingo (CAASD) (English: Santo Domingo Aqueduct and Sewerage Corporation)		Director General of Santo Domingo Aqueduct and Sewerage Corporation (Spanish: Director/a General de la Corporación del Acueducto y Alcantarillado de Santo Domingo)	Felipe Antonio "Fellito" Suberví Hernández		
Corporación de Acueducto y Alcantarillado de Santiago (CORAASAN) (English: Santiago Aqueduct and Sewerage Corporation)		Director General of Santiago Aqueduct and Sewerage Corporation (Spanish: Director/a General de la Corporación de Acueducto y Alcantarillado de Santiago)	Andrés Corsinio Cueto Rosario		
Corporación del Acueducto y Alcantarillado de Moca (CORAAMOCA) (English: Moca Aqueduct and Sewerage Corporation)		Director General of Moca Aqueduct and Sewerage Corporation (Spanish: Director/a General de la Corporación del Acueducto y Alcantarillado de Moca)	Reynaldo Méndez		
Corporación del Acueducto y Alcantarillado de La Romana (CORAAROM) (English: La Romana Aqueduct and Sewerage Corporation)		Director General of La Romana Aqueduct and Sewerage Corporation (Spanish: Director/a General de la Corporación del Acueducto y Alcantarillado de La Romana)	Dolores Núñez		
Corporación de Acueductos y Alcantarillados de Puerto Plata (CORAAPPLATA) (English: Puerto Plata Aqueduct and Sewer Corporation)		Director General of Puerto Plata Aqueduct and Sewer Corporation (Spanish: Director/a General de la Corporación de Acueductos y Alcantarillados de Puerto Plata)	Tomás Emilio Durán Garden		
Security services
Dominican Army (ERD) (Spanish: Ejército de República Dominicana)		Commanding General of the Dominican Army (Spanish: Comandante general del Ejército de República Dominicana)	Major general ERD, Jimmy Arias Grullón (b. 1977)	16 August 2026	
Dominican Air Force (FARD) (Spanish: Fuerza Aérea de República Dominicana)		Commanding General of the Dominican Air Force (Spanish: Comandante General de la Fuerza Aérea de República Dominicana)	Major general Aircraft pilot FARD, Enmanuel Marcelino Souffront Tamayo	16 August 2026	
Dominican Navy (ARD) (Spanish: Armada de República Dominicana)		Commanding General of the Dominican Navy (Spanish: Comandante General de la Armada de República Dominicana)	Vice admiral ARD, Juan Bienvenido Crisóstomo Martínez	16 August 2026	
Cuerpo Especializado de Seguridad Fronteriza Terrestre (CESFronT) (English: Specialized Land Border Security Corps)		Director General of General Specialized Land Border Security Corps (Spanish: Director/a General de la Cuerpo Especializado de Seguridad Fronteriza Terrestre)	Major general, ERD Enrique Armando Aguilera Trujillo	17 August 2026	
Dominican Republic National Police (PN) (Spanish: Policía Nacional de la República Dominicana)		Director General of the Dominican Republic National Police (Spanish: Director/a General de la Policía Nacional de la República Dominicana)	Major general PN, Ernesto Rafael Rodríguez García	16 August 2026	
Dirección Central de Policía de Turismo (POLITUR) (English: Central Directorate of Tourism Police)		Director of the Central Directorate of Tourism Police (Spanish: Director/a de la Dirección Central de Policía de Turismo)	General officer PN, Minoru Matsunaga Matsunaga		
Dirección General de Seguridad de Tránsito y Transporte Terrestre (DIGESETT) (Spanish: General Directorate of Traffic Safety and Land Transportation)		Director of the General Directorate of Traffic Safety and Land Transportation (Spanish: Director/a de la Dirección General de Seguridad de Tránsito y Transporte Terrestre)	General officer PN, Pascual Cruz Méndez		
Dirección General de Migración (República Dominicana) (DGM) (English: General Directorate of Migration)		Director General of General Directorate of Migration (Spanish: Director/a General de la Dirección General de Migración)	Vice admiral ARD, Luis Rafael Lee Ballester		
Cuerpo Especializado de Seguridad Aeroportuaria y Aviación Civil (CESAC) (English: Specialized Corps for Airport Security and Civil Aviation)		Director General of Specialized Corps for Airport Security and Civil Aviation (Spanish: Director/a General del Cuerpo Especializado de Seguridad Aeroportuaria y Aviación Civil)	Brigadier general Aircraft pilot FARD, Manuel Abad García Lithgow		
Departamento Nacional de Inteligencia (República Dominicana) (DNI) (English: National Intelligence Department)		Director of National Intelligence Department (Spanish: Director/a del Departamento Nacional de Inteligencia)	Luis Soto		
Presidential Security Corps (CUSEP) (Spanish: Cuerpo de Seguridad Presidencial)		Head of the Presidential Security Corps (Spanish: Jefe/a del Cuerpo de Seguridad Presidencial)	Brigadier general, ERD Guillermo Caro Cruz		
Servicio Nacional de Protección Ambiental (SENPA) (English: National Environmental Protection Service)		Director General of the National Environmental Protection Service (Spanish: Director/a General del Servicio Nacional de Protección Ambiental)	Brigadier general, ERD Rafael Genaro Almonte Cid		
Dirección General de Servicios Penitenciarios y Correccionales (DGSPC) (English: National Environmental Protection Service)		Director General of the General Directorate of Penitentiary and Correctional Services (Spanish: Director/a General del Dirección General de Servicios Penitenciarios y Correccionales)	Roberto Jose Santana Sanchez		

=== Former cabinet members ===
Office	Image	Title	Officeholder	Assumed office	Left office	Ref.
Ministries
Ministerio de la Presidencia (República Dominicana) (MINPRE) (English: Ministry of the Presidency)		Minister of the Presidency (Spanish: Ministro/a de la Presidencia)	Lisandro Macarrulla (b. 1956)	16 August 2020	24 July 2022	
Ministerio de la Presidencia (República Dominicana) (MINPRE) (English: Ministry of the Presidency)		Minister of the Presidency (Spanish: Ministro/a de la Presidencia)	Joel Santos (b. 1969)	22 August 2022	16 August 2024	
Ministerio de Defensa de la República Dominicana (MIDE) (English: Ministry of Defense of the Dominican Republic)		Minister of Defense (Spanish: Ministro/a de Defensa)	Lieutenant general, ERD Carlos Luciano Díaz Morfa (b. 1959)	16 August 2020	16 August 2024	
Ministry of Foreign Affairs (MIREX) (Spanish: Ministerio de Relaciones Exteriores de la República Dominicana)		Minister of Foreign Affairs (Spanish: Ministro/a de Relaciones Exteriores)	Roberto Álvarez (b. 1944)	16 August 2020	16 August 2026	
Attorney General of the Republic (PGR) (English: Procuraduría General de la República)		Attorney General of the Republic (Spanish: Procurador General de la República)	Miriam Germán Brito (b. 1948)	16 August 2020	24 February 2025	
Ministerio de Interior y Policía (República Dominicana) (MIP) (English: Ministry of Interior and Police)		Minister of Interior and Police (Spanish: Ministro/a de Interior y Policía)	Jesús "Chú" Vásquez Martínez	16 August 2020	30 July 2024	
Ministry of Finance and Economy (MHE) (Spanish: Ministerio de Hacienda y Economía de la República Dominicana)		Minister of Finance and Economy (Spanish: Ministro/a de Hacienda y Economía)	Jochi Vicente	16 August 2020	15 July 2025	
Ministry of Industry, Trade and MSMEs (MICM) (English: Ministerio de Industria, Comercio y Mipymes)		Minister of Industry, Trade and MSMEs (Spanish: Ministro/a de Industria, Comercio y Mipymes)	Ito Bisonó (b. 1963)	16 August 2020	6 January 2026	
Ministry of Economy (MEPyD) (Spanish: Ministerio de Economía, Planificación y Desarrollo)		Minister of Economy, Planning and Development (Spanish: Ministro/a de Economía, Planificación y Desarrollo)	Miguel Ceara Hatton (b. 1954)	16 August 2020	6 July 2022	
Ministry of Economy (MEPyD) (Spanish: Ministerio de Economía, Planificación y Desarrollo)		Minister of Economy, Planning and Development (Spanish: Ministro/a de Economía, Planificación y Desarrollo)	Pável Isa Contreras	7 July 2022	10 January 2025	
Ministerio Administrativo de la Presidencia (República Dominicana) (MAPRE) (English: Administrative Ministry of the Presidency)		Administrative Minister of the Presidency (Spanish: Ministro/a Administrativo de la Presidencia)	José Ignacio Paliza (b. 1981)	16 August 2020	17 July 2024	
Ministry of Education (MINERD) (Spanish: Ministerio de Educación de la República Dominicana)		Minister of Education (Spanish: Ministro/a de Educación)	Roberto Fulcar Encarnación	16 August 2020	2 August 2022	
Ministry of Education (MINERD) (Spanish: Ministerio de Educación de la República Dominicana)		Minister of Education (Spanish: Ministro/a de Educación)	Ángel Hernández Castillo (b. 1953)	3 August 2020	26 February 2025	
Ministerio de Salud Pública y Asistencia Social (República Dominicana) (MISPAS or MSP) (English: Ministry of Public Health and Social Assistance of the Dominican Republic)		Minister of Public Health and Social Assistance (Spanish: Ministro/a de Salud Pública y Asistencia Social)	Plutarco Arias (b. 1958)	16 August 2020	26 February 2021	
Ministerio de Salud Pública y Asistencia Social (República Dominicana) (MISPAS or MSP) (English: Ministry of Public Health and Social Assistance of the Dominican Republic)		Minister of Public Health and Social Assistance (Spanish: Ministro/a de Salud Pública y Asistencia Social)	Daniel Enrique Rivera	1 March 2021	17 January 2024	

== See also ==
- Constitution of the Dominican Republic
- Law of the Dominican Republic
- Politics of the Dominican Republic
- Elections in the Dominican Republic
- List of political parties in the Dominican Republic
