= Ministry of Higher Education, Science and Technology (Dominican Republic) =

Government ministry of the Dominican Republic

- Ministerio de Educación Superior, Ciencia y Tecnología (Spanish); MESCyT
- Coat of arms of the Dominican Republic

- Current logo

Agency overview
- Formed: August 13, 2001; 25 years ago
- Preceding agency: Secretary of State of Higher Education, Science and Technology (2001–2010)
- Type: Ministry; Ministry of Higher Education, Science and Technology; Ministries of the Dominican Republic
- Jurisdiction: Dominican Republic
- Headquarters: 18°28′21″N 69°54′44″W Avenida Máximo Gómez 31, esquina Avenida Pedro Henríquez Ureña, Gascue, Santo Domingo, Distrito Nacional, 10204, Dominican Republic
- Employees: 1,002 (July 2026)
- Annual budget: RD$20,782,483,558.00 billion (FY 2026); RD$16,876,109,465.18 billion (2021)
- Minister responsible: Rafael Santos Badía, Minister of Higher Education, Science and Technology
- Parent agency: Executive branch of the Government of the Dominican Republic
- Child agency: See internal structure
- Key document: Law No. 139-01 (in Spanish)
- Website: mescyt.gob.do (in Spanish)

The Ministry of Higher Education, Science and Technology (Spanish: Ministerio de Educación Superior, Ciencia y Tecnología, MESCyT), is a government institution that regulates higher education in the country as well as research, grants and technology.

It originated from a commission to modernize the Dominican government and it was officially created as the Secretaría de Estado de Educación Superior, Ciencia y Tecnología on 2001. The current minister is Rafael Santos Badía, who assumed office on February 9, 2026.

== History ==
=== Higher education in the Dominican Republic ===
The history of higher education in the Dominican Republic goes back to colonial times. The first academic center was founded by Dominican friars in 1518 and it would later be elevated to a university by the papal bull In Apostolatus Culmine of October 28, 1538. This was St. Thomas Aquinus University (Spanish: Real y Pontificia Universidad de Santo Tomás de Aquino). This institution closed on 1801 when the Spanish colony of Santo Domingo became part of the French Empire.

Higher education was restored on 1815 by writer and politician José Núñez de Cáceres, who was elected rector of the institution. He was responsible of declaring the Ephemeral Independence of 1821, which saw the beginning of the Haitian occupation of the Spanish side and the closing of the university.

Between 1866 and 1891, the Professional Institute (Instituto Profesional) had some of the functions of the nonexistent University. The Professional Institute reappeared on 1895. On November 16, 1914, it was transformed into the University of Santo Domingo (Universidad de Santo Domingo). This institution temporarily closed during the United States occupation of the Dominican Republic (1916-1924).

On December 31, 1961, by the Law no. 5778, the center acquired its autonomy, renaming itself as the Autonomous University of Santo Domingo (Universidad Autónoma de Santo Domingo). The first autonomous authorities were elected in February 1962.

=== History of the institution ===
The origin of the Ministry of Higher Education, Science and Technology comes from the Commission to Reform and Modernize the Nation (Comisión para la Reforma y Modernización del Estado) from 1966. One of its objectives was to reorganize the National System for Science and Technology (Sistema Nacional de Ciencia y Tecnología). This commission concluded that it was a necessity to create an institution that could manage the scientific and technological activities, as well as everything relating to higher education and universities.

As a result, the Dominican government signed the creation of the Secretary of State of Higher Education, Science and Technology (Secretaría de Estado de Educación Superior, Ciencia y Tecnología) on 2001, by the Law no. 139–01. It adopted its current name, Ministry of Higher Education, Science and Technology (Ministerio de Educación Superior, Ciencia y Tecnología), after the 2010 Constitutional reform and the subsequent Decree no. 56-10 which changed the names of all government agencies. It is generally known by its acronym, MESCyT.

== Internal structure ==
As all other Ministries of the Dominican Republic, the MESCyT is subdivided into viceministries. These are:

- Administrative-Financial Viceministry
- Viceministry of Higher Education
- Viceministry of Science and Technology
- Viceministry of Evaluation and Certification
- Viceministry of International Relations

Other offices of lower rank are:

- Grants Office
- Foreign Languages Office
- Information Technology Office
- Communications Office

== Evolution of the ministry's logo ==
2010–2020 (under the presidencies of Leonel Fernández and Danilo Medina)

2020–present (under the presidency of Luis Abinader)

== See also ==
- List of universities in the Dominican Republic
- List of Dominican ministers of higher learning, science and technology
