= Ministerio de Hacienda =

Ministerio de Hacienda may refer to:

- Ministry of Finance (Chile)
- Ministry of Finance (Dominican Republic)
- Ministry of Finance (Spain)
