= Cruz Maria Dotel =

Dominican visual artist and educator

Cruz María Dotel
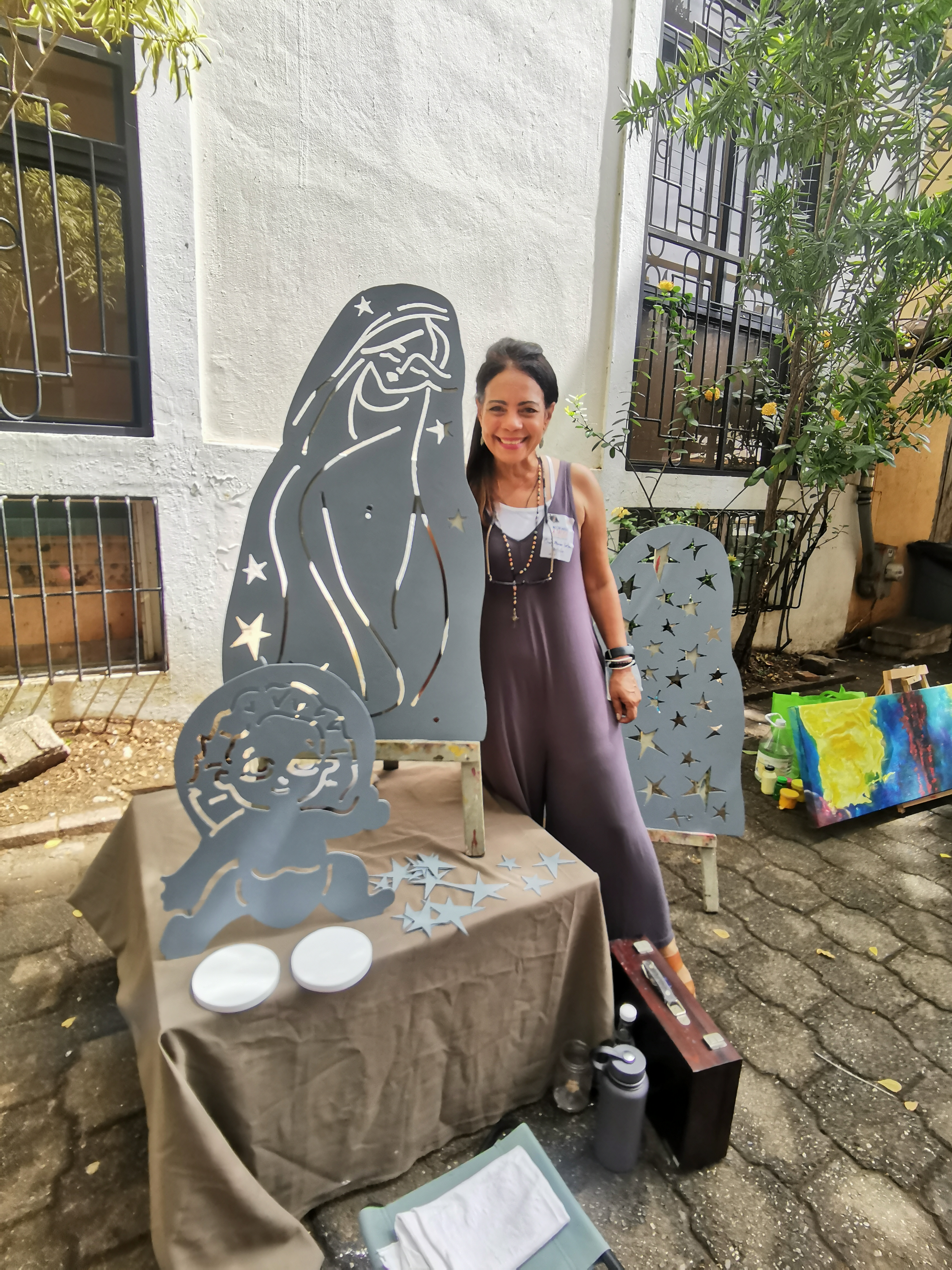
- Cruz María Dotel
- Citizenship: Dominican Republic
- Occupations: Visual artist, educator
- Years active: 2000–present
- Employer: Ministry of Education of the Dominican Republic
- Known for: Visual arts, arts education, doctoral research on art and education

Cruz María Dotel is a Dominican visual artist and educator. Her work is mainly focused on nature, especially water and territory.

She has exhibited her work in the Dominican Republic and internationally, including Portugal and Japón. She has also participated in the National Biennial of Visual Arts in Santo Domingo.

== Academic work ==
Dotel completed a doctoral thesis at the University of Murcia focused on how artistic projects influence teaching practice and competency-based education in the Dominican Republic.

She has contributed to the design and development of arts education curricula in the Dominican Republic, participating in official publications of the Ministry of Education.

She has also been involved in curriculum adaptation processes at different educational levels, including primary and initial education.

Her work is also linked to broader educational initiatives aligned with international frameworks in education.

Her work has been referenced in educational and institutional documents related to arts education and curriculum development in the Dominican Republic.

Her thesis and academic work are also available in institutional and academic libraries.

Her work in education has been linked to curriculum development and to the integration of art as a tool to strengthen teaching practice and critical thinking within the Dominican educational system.

Dotel has coordinated and co-authored official educational materials for the teaching of arts education in the Dominican Republic, including a series of booklets published by the Ministry of Education’s Libro Abierto publishing initiative in 2024.

She has also participated as a speaker at conferences and forums within the education sector, including events organized by the Dominican Institute for the Evaluation and Research of Educational Quality (IDEICE). She has also served as a member of the international editorial board of the journal EARI. Educación Artística. Revista de Investigación.

== Career ==
Dotel has been active since the early 2000s. She has presented exhibitions such as Estudio preparatorio del coraje in 2021.

She has also worked in the Dominican Ministry of Education (Dominican Republic) as a national coordinator for arts education.
