= Ministries of the Dominican Republic =

The Ministries of the Dominican Republic (Spanish: Ministerios de la República Dominicana) are the primary units of the executive branch of the government of the Dominican Republic. These offices were formerly known as Secretaries of State (Spanish: Secretarias de Estado), but that denominations changed on 2010, with the Constitutional reform. The change was effective on February 6, 2010, by Decree no. 55–10.

The history of these offices can be traced to the first Constitution of the Dominican Republic, signed at San Cristóbal, on November 6, 1844. The first four institutions, known as Secretaries of State, were: Justice and Public Instruction; the Interior and Police; Finance and Commerce; and War and Navy. As of February, 2023, the Dominican Republic has a total of 24 Ministries, including the General Attorney's Office.

Ministries are analogous to Departments and Secretaries of State in others nations.

== Council of Ministers ==
The heads of the ministries, known as Ministers of their respective department, form the traditional Cabinet of the Dominican Republic, an executive organ that serves at the disposal of the president for the coordination of the government affairs and normally act as an advisory body to the presidency.

Out of the 24 Ministries, only 3 are women, as of February 2023.

== Current Ministries ==
As of February, 2023, the Dominican Republic has a total of 24 Ministries, the latest being the Ministry of Housing and Constructions, established on 2021. Below, a table listing all Ministries, the year they were created and their initial name.

Office	Created on	Budget (2021) in RD$
Office of the Attorney General of the RepublicProcuraduría General de la República	1844	10,566,729,557.74
Ministry of the Presidency Ministerio de la Presidencia	1927	27,330,805,616.30
Administrative Ministry of the Presidency Ministerio Administrativo de la Presidencia	2012	14,690,695,735.40
Ministry of Public Administration Ministerio de Administración Pública	2008	916,023,908.28
Ministry of Foreign AffairsMinisterio de Relaciones Exteriores	1874	8,261,136,983.55
Ministry of Defense Ministerio de Defensa	1844	34,903,848,896.17
Ministry of the Interior and Police Ministerio de Interior y Policía	1844	50,169,229,527.51
Ministry of FinanceMinisterio de Hacienda	1844	20,222,491,904.92
Ministry of Agriculture Ministerio de Agricultura	1854	16,918,221,101.88
Ministry of Industry, Trade and MSMEs Ministerio de Industria, Comercio y Mipymes	1966	17,938,366,655.89
Ministry of Energy and Mines Ministerio de Energía y Minas	2013	1,524,638,866.40
Ministry of Tourism Ministerio de Turismo	1979	3,940,210,676.42
Ministry of Economy, Planning and DevelopmentMinisterio de Economía, Planificación y Desarrollo	2006	2,438,494,144.12
Ministry of Labor Ministerio de Trabajo	1930	1,874,075,576-52
Ministry of Public Works and Communications Ministerio de Obras Públicas y Comunicaciones	1887	45,743,372,024.07
Ministry of Housing and Constructions Ministerio de Vivienda y Edificaciones	2021	NA
Ministry of Environment and Natural Resources Ministerio de Medio Ambiente y Recursos Naturales	2000	12,237,611,021.36
Ministry of Public Health and Social Assistance Ministerio de Salud Pública y Asistencia Social	1924	145,792,041,708.08
Ministry of Education Ministerio de Educación	1934	186,774,494,864.96
Ministry of Culture Ministerio de Cultura	2000	2,797,080,497.09
Ministry of Higher Education, Science and TechnologyMinisterio de Educación Superior, Ciencia y Tecnología	2001	16,876,109,465.18
Ministry of Women Ministerio de la Mujer	1999	1,050,462,822.83
Ministry of Youth Ministerio de la Juventud	2000	626,848,908.53
Ministry of Sports and Recreation Ministerio de Deporte y Recreación	1974	3,041,611,938.46
