= Ministry of Finance and Economy (Dominican Republic) =

Government ministry of the Dominican Republic

Ministry of Finance and Economy of the Dominican Republic
- Ministerio de Hacienda y Economía de la República Dominicana (Spanish); MHE
- Coat of arms of the Dominican Republic

- Logo of the Ministry between 2020 and 2025

Agency overview
- Formed: November 14, 1844; 182 years ago
- Preceding agency: Secretary of State of Finance and Trade (1844–1916) Secretary of Treasury and Finance (1916–1924) Secretary of State of Finance, Labour and Communications (1924–1965) Secretary of State of Finance (1965–2010) Ministry of Finance (2010–2025)
- Type: Ministry; Ministry of finance Ministries of the Dominican Republic
- Headquarters: 18°28′29″N 69°54′19″W Avenida México 45, Gascue, Santo Domingo, Distrito Nacional, 10201, Dominican Republic
- Employees: 1,612 (July 2026)
- Annual budget: RD$19,297,367,709.00 billion (FY 2026); RD$20,222,491,904.92 billion (2021)
- Minister responsible: Magín Javier Díaz, Minister of Finance and Economy
- Parent agency: Executive branch of the Government of the Dominican Republic
- Child agencies: See internal structure; See affiliated agencies
- Key document: Law No. 45-25 (in Spanish)
- Website: www.hacienda.gob.do (in Spanish)

The Ministry of Finance and Economy of the Dominican Republic (Spanish: Ministerio de Hacienda y Economía de la República Dominicana, MHE) also known as Treasury (Spanish: Hacienda), is the government institution in charge of preparing, executing and evaluating the country's fiscal policies, including national income, expenses and finance and securing its sustainability in relation to the economical policies. Other functions are to propose fiscal and customs legislation, regulate loans' authorization and negotiation, approve public contracting, and periodically prepare the state of the budget, finance and economy.

It was established on the first Dominican Constitution of 1844 as the Secretary of State of Finance and Trade (Secretaría de Estado de Hacienda y Comercio). Its headquarters are located at Santo Domingo. Since 15 July 2025, its Minister is Magín Javier Díaz.

With the enactment of Law 45-25, which provides for the merger of the Ministry of Finance and the Ministry of Economy, Planning and Development, the entity assumes part of the functions of the former Ministry of Economy, Planning and Development and is now known as the Ministry of Finance and Economy.

== History ==
The origin of this Ministry can be found on the first Dominican Constitution, signed on November 6, 1844. This document specified that:

There will be four Ministers-Secretaries of State and of the following Departments: first, of Justice and Public Instruction; second, of the Interior and Police; third, of Finance and Trade; fourth of War and Navy.

— Constituent Assembly, Constitution of San Cristóbal, Title III, Chapter II, Section II, Art. 109

A few days later, on November 14, 1844, the office was officially created as the Secretary of State of Finance and Trade (Secretaría de Estado de Hacienda y Comercio), being its first ministre-secretary Ricardo Miura. The office was also held in its early days by national hero Matías Ramón Mella, as well as José Manuel Caminero, Jacinto de la Concha and José Joaquín Puello.

During the Second Republic (1865–1916), this institution saw several financial crisis that damaged the politics of the Dominican Republic. President Ulises Heureaux's government was characterized by the unsupported issue of banknotes and the unmeasured debt to foreign companies. This situation led to the Dominico-American Convention of 1907 during the presidency of Ramón Cáceres, which ceded Dominican customs to the United States. This eventually led to the American occupation of the Dominican Republic (1916–1924). During this period, the institution is renamed Secretary of Treasury and Finance (Secretaría de Estado del Tesoro y Hacienda).

During the Third Republic (1924–1965), this office was renamed several times, being known for a time as Secretary of State of Finance, Labour and Communications (Secretaría de Estado de Hacienda, Trabajo y Comunicaciones). At the start of the Fourth Republic in 1965, it was known as Secretary of State of Finance (Secretaría de Estado de Finanzas).

On 2006, Law no. 494-06 reorganized the institution, which was renamed from Finanzas to Hacienda, which in English can be translated as both finance or internal revenue. At the same, the government created a new departement, the Secretary of State of Economy, Planning and Development (Secretaría de Estado de Economía, Planificación y Desarrollo).

It adopted its current name, Ministry of Finance or Internal Revenue (Ministerio de Hacienda), after the 2010 Constitutional reform and the subsequent Decree no. 56-10 which changed the names of all government agencies.

== Internal structure ==
As all other Ministries of the Dominican Republic, the Ministry of Finance is subdivided into vice-ministries. These are:

- Technical-Administrative Vice-ministry
- Vice-ministry of Budget, Accounting and Assets
- Vice-ministry of State Assets
- Vice-ministry of the Treasury
- Vice-ministry of Public Credit
- Vice-ministry of Fiscal Policy

== Affiliated agencies ==
The Bank of Reserves of the Dominican Republic (BanReservas) is a descentralized and autonomous institution related to the Ministry of Finance.

As fiscal regulator, the Ministry of Finance has a great number of decentralized institutions. Some of these are:

- Superintendency of Insurance
- General Office of Customs (DGA)
- General Office of Internal Revenue (DGII)
- General Office of National Cadastre
- General Office of Budget
- General Office of Public Credit
- Bank of Reserves of the Dominican Republic (BanReservas)
- National Treasury
- National Lottery
- Savings Fund for Workers and Monte de Piedad

== List of ministers ==
- Ricardo Miura, 1844–1847
- José María Caminero, 1847–1849
- Jacinto de la Concha, 1849
- Ramón Matías Mella, 1849–1850
- Manuel Joaquín del Monte, 1850–1851
- Miguel Lavastida, 1851–1852
- Francisco Cruz Moreno, 1852–1855
- Manuel Joaquín del Monte, 1855–1856
- Danuel Coén, 1856–1858
- Pablo Pujols, 1858
- José Mareo Perdomo, 1858–1860
- Pedro Ricart Torres, 1860–1861
- Pablo Pujols, 1863
- Ricardo Curiel, 1863–1864
- José Manuel Glas, 1863–1864
- Alfredo Deetjen, 1864
- Rafael M. Leyba, 1864–1865
- Pablo Pujols, 1865
- Eusebio Pereyra, 1865
- Theodore Stanley Heneken, 1865
- Segundo Peralta, 1865
- Juan Ramón Fiallo, 1865
- Francisco Saviñón, 1865
- Pedro Tomás Garrido, 1865–1866
- Eusebio Pereyra, 1866
- Pedro Tomás Garrido, 1866
- Juan Ramón Fiallo, 1866
- Pablo Pujols, 1866–1867
- Pedro Perdomo, 1867–1868
- Carlos Nouel, 1868
- Pedro Tomás Garrido, 1868
- Carlos Moreno, 1868
- Ricardo Curiel, 1868–1873
- Idelfonso Mella Castillo, 1873–1874
- Luis Durocher, 1874
- José Manuel Glas, 1874
- Francisco Xavier Amiama, 1874–1875
- Pedro Tomás Garrido, 1875
- Juan Bautista Zafra, 1875–1876
- Mariano A. Cesteros, 1876
- Juan Bautista Zafra, 1876
- José de Jesús Castro, 1876
- Manuel María Gautier, 1876
- Pedro María Piñeiro, 1876
- Manuel A. Cáceres, 1876–1878
- Francisco Gregorio Billini, 1878
- Manuel de Jesús Rodríguez, 1878
- Pedro María Aristy, 1878–1879
- Apolinar de Castro, 1879
- Maximiliano Grullón, 1879–1880
- Rodolfo Boscowitz, 1880–1882
- Eugenio Generoso de Marchena, 1882–1884
- Amable Damirón, 1884–1885
- Angel R. Delgado, 1885
- Lucas Gibbes, 1885
- Rodolfo Boscowitz, 1885–1887
- Julio J. Julia, 1887–1889
- Juan Francisco Sánchez, 1889–1893
- Modesto Rivas, 1893–1897
- José de Jesús Álvarez, 1897–1899
- Federico Augusto González, 1899–1900
- Elías Brache, 1900–1902
- Emiliano Tejera, 1902–1903
- Rafael Galván, 1903
- José Brache, 1903
- Enrique Pou, 1903–1904
- Federico Velásquez Hernández, 1904–1911
- Angel M. Soler, 1911
- Francisco A. Córdova, 1911–1912
- Eduardo Ricart, 1912
- Arturo Grullón, 1912
- Eduardo Soler, 1912–1913
- Mario A. Saviñón, 1913–1914
- Salvador B. Gautier, 1914
- Armando Pérez Perdomo, 1914–1915
- Francisco Herrera, 1915
- José Manuel Jiménez, 1915–1916
- Francisco J. Peynado, 1916
- US military intervention
- Eladio Sánchez, 1922–1923
- Agustín Acevedo, 1923–1924
- José Dolores Alfonseca, 1924–1926
- Martín de Moya, 1926–1930
- Jafet Hernández, 1930
- Roberto Despradel, 1930–1931
- Teódulio Pina Chevalier, 1931
- Santiago Michelena, 1931–1932
- Rafael Paino Pichardo, 1932–1933
- Tulio Manuel Cestero, 1933
- Rafael Brache, 1933–1934
- Agustín Aristy, 1934–1938
- Federico García Godoy, 1938–1940
- Virgilio Álvarez Pina, 1940–1942
- Manuel Cocco, 1942–1943
- Furcy Pichardo, 1943–1944
- Manuel de Jesús Troncoso de la Concha, 1944–1945
- Horacio A. Febles, 1945
- Rafael Paino Pichardo, 1945–1947
- Victor Garrido, 1947–1949
- José A. Castellanos, 1949–1950
- Generoso Núñez, 1950–1952
- Salvador Ortíz, 1952–1953
- Julio de la Rocha Báez, 1953–1954
- Salvador Lluberes Peña, 1954
- Virgilio Álvarez Sánchez, 1954–1956
- Salvador Ortíz, 1956
- Virgilio Álvarez Sánchez, 1956–1958
- José A. Turull Ricart, 1958–1959
- Virgilio Álvarez Sánchez, 1959
- José Ernesto García Aybar, 1959
- José A. Turull Ricart, 1959
- Furcy Pichardo, 1959–1961
- José A. Quezada, 1961
- Pedro Justo Carrión, 1961
- José Manuel Machado, 1961–1962
- Manuel Enrique Tavarez, 1962
- Ramón Cáceres Troncoso, 1962–1963
- Jacobo Majluta, 1963
- Pedro Manuel Casals, 1963
- Manuel Ramón Cruz Díaz, 1964
- José Andrés Aybar Castellanos, 1964–1965
- José Rafael Abinader, 1965
- Generoso Núñez, 1965
- Fidel Méndez Núñez, 1965
- Enrique Tarazona, 1965–1966
- Antonio Martínez Francisco, 1966–1970
- Arturo Muñiz Marte, 1970–1973
- Carlos Séliman, 1973–1975
- Fernando Álvarez Bogaert, 1975–1976
- Diógenes Fernández, 1976–1977
- Victor Gómez Bergés, 1977
- Reynaldo A. Bisonó, 1977–1978
- Manuel José Cabral, 1978–1979
- Bolívar Báez Ortíz, 1979–1982
- Ramón Martínez Aponte, 1982
- José Rafael Abinader, 1982–1984
- José Santos Taveras, 1984
- Hugo Guiliani Cury, 1984
- Manuel Cocco Guerrero, 1984–1986
- Roberto Saladín, 1986–1987
- José Carlos Isaias, 1987–1988
- Roberto Martínez Villanueva, 1988–1989
- Guillermo Caram, 1989
- Rodolfo Rincón Martínez, 1989–1990
- Licelot Marte de Barrios, 1990–1993
- Florencio Lorenzo Silva, 1993–1994
- Luis Taveras Andujar, 1994–1995
- Pedro Reynoso Jimenez, 1995
- Roberto Martínez Villanueva, 1995–1996
- Daniel Toribio, 1996–2000
- Fernando Álvarez Bogaert, 2000–2002
- José Lois Malkún, 2002–2003
- Rafael Calderon Martínez, 2003–2004
- Vicente Bengoa, 2004–2011
- Daniel Toribio, 2011–2012
- Simón Lizardo Mézquita, 2012–2016
- Donald Guerrero, 2016–2020
- José Manuel Vicente Dubocq, 2020–2025
- Magín Díaz, since 2025

== Evolution of the ministry's logo ==
2010–2020 (under the presidencies of Leonel Fernández and Danilo Medina)

2020–2025 (under the presidency of Luis Abinader)

== See also ==
- Cabinet of the Dominican Republic
