= Rainier Mallol =

Dominican engineer

Ministry of Economy, Planning and Development (MEPyD)
- Director of Information and Communication Technologies (ICT)

Ministry of Industry, Commerce and Mipymes (MICM)
- Director of Information and Communication Technologies (ICT)

Personal details
- Born: Rainier Mallol Cotes; May 9, 1991 (age 35) Santo Domingo, Dominican Republic
- Citizenship: Dominican Republic
- Education: Harvard University

Rainier Mallol (born May 9, 1991 in Santo Domingo, Dominican Republic) is a Dominican entrepreneur and engineer best known for implementing artificial intelligence (AI) technologies for predicting disease outbreaks and other uses. He is the founder of cxgenies and co-founder of AIME (Artificial Intelligence in Medical Epidemiology).

He has served as the Director of Information and Communication Technologies (ICT) at the Dominican Republic's Ministry of Economy, Planning and Development (MEPyD) and was also the Director of ICT at the Ministry of Industry, Commerce and Mipymes (MICM).

== Early life and education ==
Rainier Mallol was born in 1991 in Santo Domingo, Dominican Republic.

He earned a bachelor's degree in Telematics Engineering from Pontificia Universidad Católica Madre y Maestra (PUCMM). In 2015, Mallol enrolled in Singularity University at NASA Ames Research Park, where he began developing his project to predict disease outbreaks using AI.

Mallol pursued graduate studies at Harvard University, where he obtained a master's degree in international development.

== Career ==
=== AIME ===
In 2014, while a student at Singularity University, Mallol co-founded AIME, a company focused on predicting disease outbreaks using artificial intelligence. He developed an AI platform capable of predicting outbreaks of diseases such as dengue fever, Zika, and chikungunya with up to 87% accuracy, three months in advance.

AIME's platform analyzes various data variables, including weather patterns, population density, and infrastructure, to forecast potential outbreak zones. The system has been piloted and implemented in countries like Malaysia, Brazil, and the Philippines. During the 2016 Summer Olympics in Rio de Janeiro, AIME assisted in tracking and controlling the Zika virus.

=== cxgenies ===
Mallol founded cxgenies, an AI-driven platform specializing in customer experience analysis. The platform utilizes AI to analyze customer feedback across various interaction channels, including calls, emails, reviews, surveys, social media, and chats, design personalized action plans, and assess service operators' performance.

== Public service ==
Ministry of Economy, Planning and Development

Mallol served as the Director of Information and Communication Technologies (ICT) at the Dominican Republic's Ministry of Economy, Planning and Development (MEPyD). In this role, he helped improve government data systems and public services.

Member of the Presidential Committee for COVID-19 Management

In 2020, amid the COVID-19 pandemic, Mallol was invited to join the Dominican Republic's Presidential Committee for COVID-19 management. He developed and led the creation of data systems to inform policies aimed at mitigating the economic impacts of the pandemic and improving crisis management.

Ministry of Industry, Commerce and Mipymes

In 2023, Mallol joined the Ministry of Industry, Commerce and Mipymes (MICM) as the Director of ICT. He has been involved in initiatives related to implementing systems with a nation-wide impact such as the Electronic System of Movable Security Interests, cybersecurity and digital infrastructure projects in the Dominican Republic.

== Awards and honors ==
- UN Young Leader for the Sustainable Development Goals (2016)
- MIT Innovators Under 35 (2017)
- Vanity Fair Future Innovators Index (2019)
- Forbes 30 Under 30 (2019)
