= Mallol =

Mallol is a surname. Notable people with the surname include:

- Lorenç Mallol (fl. 1350), Catalan poet
- Maria Teresa Ferrer i Mallol (1940-2017), Catalan historian
- Rainier Mallol (born 1991), Dominican engineer and businessman
- Tomàs Mallol (born 1923), Catalan film-maker whose collection formed the basis of the Museum of Cinema-Tomàs Mallol collection in Girona
