= Juan Ariel Jiménez =

Dominican politician

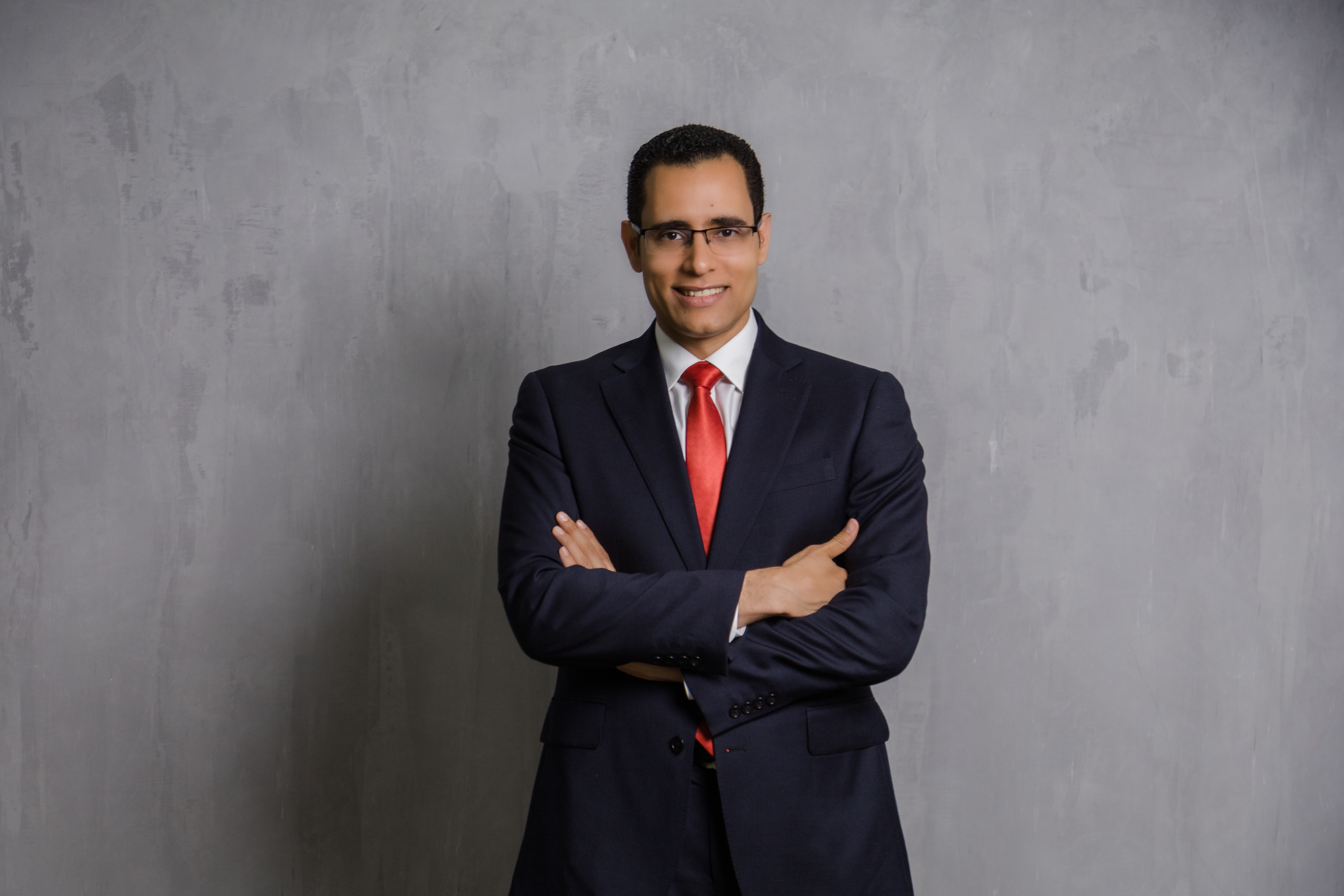

Ministry of Economy, Planning and Development
- In office 2019–2020
- President: Danilo Medina

Personal details
- Born: Juan Ariel Jiménez Núñez; February 1985 (age 41) Dominican Republic
- Party: Dominican Liberation Party
- Education: Pontificia Universidad Católica Madre y Maestra (BA); Harvard Kennedy School (MPA)

Juan Ariel Jiménez is a Dominican economist and government minister who served in the government of the Dominican Republic as the Minister of Economy, Planning and Development from August 2019 to 2020 under President Danilo Medina. Between 2021 and 2022, he was elected to the Central Committee of his political organization and later promoted to the Political Committee, the highest organization of the party's leadership. He is currently Vice President of the PLD.
