= Ministry of Culture (Dominican Republic) =

Government ministry of the Dominican Republic

Ministry of Culture of the Dominican Republic
- Ministerio de Cultura de la República Dominicana (Spanish); MINC
- Coat of arms of the Dominican Republic

- Current logo

- Ministry of Culture Headquarters (2026)

Agency overview
- Formed: June 28, 2000; 26 years ago
- Preceding agency: Secretary of State of Culture (2000–2010)
- Type: Ministry; Ministry of Culture; Ministries of the Dominican Republic
- Jurisdiction: Dominican Republic
- Headquarters: 18°27′54″N 69°53′40″W Avenida George Washington, esquina Calle Presidente Vicini Burgos, Gascue, Santo Domingo, Distrito Nacional, 10205, Dominican Republic
- Employees: 1,338 (July 2026)
- Annual budget: RD$4,419,749,461.87 billion (FY 2026); RD$2,797,080,497.09 billion (2021)
- Minister responsible: Roberto Ángel Salcedo, Minister of Culture
- Parent agency: Executive branch of the Government of the Dominican Republic
- Child agencies: See internal structure; See affiliated institutions
- Key document: Law No. 41-00 (in Spanish)
- Website: cultura.gob.do (in Spanish)

The Ministry of Culture of the Dominican Republic (Spanish: Ministerio de Cultura de la República Dominicana, MINC), is a government institution in charge of cultural activities, cultural heritage and creative manifestations. Its main objective is to protect the nation's identity, guarantying the cultural rights of its people. At the same time, it coordinates awards, festivals, fairs, museums, among others.

It appeared on 2000 as the Secretary of State of Culture (Spanish: Secretaría de Estado de Cultura). Its headquarters are located at Santo Domingo. Its Minister is Roberto Ángel Salcedo, since February 3, 2025.

== History ==
The first reference to an office dedicated specifically to culture in the Dominican Republic can be found on 1934 with the creation of the Secretary of State of Education and Fine Arts (Secretaría de Estado de Educación y Bellas Artes). This is the origin of the modern Ministry of Education. On 1965, this institution received the name Secretary of State of Education, Fine Arts and Worship (Secretaría de Estado de Educación, Bellas Artes y Cultos), taking attributions from the Secretary of State of External Relations. On 1997, its name would change again to Secretary of State of Education and Culture (Secretaría de Estado de Educación y Cultura).

On 1979, a UNESCO mission, together with Dominican intellectuals, made a diagnosis of the government cultural institutions, which concluded that these offices were scattered between several Secretaries and that it was necessary to create a consolidated organism to take over all cultural matters.

It wouldn't be until 1997, during the first presidency of Leonel Fernández, that the Presidential Board of Culture (Consejo Presidencial de Cultura) was created to coordinate the General Archive of the Nation, the National Library, the National Theater, several museums, school, theaters and other cultural and crafts centers. This Board was led by singer and composer Víctor Víctor.

To answer these demands of artists and intellectuals, on June 28, 2000, Leonel Fernandez's Government signed Law 41–00, which would definitely create the Secretary of State of Culture (Secretaría de Estado de Cultura) as the coordinator of all cultural matters.

It adopted its current name, Ministry of Culture (Ministerio de Cultura), after the 2010 Constitutional reform and the subsequent Decree no. 56-10 which changed the names of all government agencies.

== Internal structure ==
Similar to other Ministries of the Dominican Republic, the Ministry of Culture is subdivided into vice-ministries. These are:

- Vice-ministry of Cultural Development and Investigation
- Vice-ministry of Creativity and Artistic Training
- Vice-ministry of Cultural Heritage
- Vice-ministry of Cultural Identity and Citizenship
- Vice-ministry of Cultural Identities
- Vice-ministry for Territorial Decentralization and Coordination

== Affiliated institutions ==
The Ministry of Culture is in charge of many different cultural activities. This is the reason why it has many affiliated agencies, according to the different arts and cultural centers. Some of these are:

- Great Cibao Theater
- Eduardo Brito National Theater
- National Craftsmanship Center
- General Office of Cinematography
- Visual Arts National School
- Drama National School
- National Conservatory
- National Center for Works of Arts and Documents Conservation
- Pedro Henríquez Ureña National Library
- Dominican National Ballet
- Narciso González Cultural Center
- Elia Mena National School of Music

Other offices also connected to this Ministry are:

- Dominican National Committee to the UNESCO
- Public Shows National Committee
- General Office of Museums
- National Office of Landmark Heritage
- National Office of Sub-aquatic Cultural Heritage
- National Office of Books and Reading

The National Archive of the Nation became an autonomous institution on 2010.

== Evolution of the ministry's logo ==
2010–2020 (under the presidencies of Leonel Fernández and Danilo Medina)

2020–present (under the presidency of Luis Abinader)
