= Ministry of Industry and Trade (Dominican Republic) =

Government ministry of the Dominican Republic

Ministry of Industry, Trade and MSMEs
- Ministerio de Industria, Comercio y Mipymes (Spanish); MICM
- Coat of arms of the Dominican Republic

- Current logo

- Ministry of Industry, Trade and MSMEs HQ, "Torre MICM" in 2026

Agency overview
- Formed: June 30, 1966; 60 years ago
- Preceding agency: Secretary of State of Finance and Trade (1844–1934) Secretary of State of Labor, Agriculture, Industry and Trade (1934–1966) Secretary of State of Industry and Trade (1966–2010) Ministry of Industry and Trade (2010–2017)
- Type: Ministry; Ministry of Trade and Industry; Ministries of the Dominican Republic
- Jurisdiction: Dominican Republic
- Headquarters: 18°27′35″N 69°56′28″W Torre MICM, Avenida 27 de Febrero 306, Bella Vista, Santo Domingo, Distrito Nacional, Dominican Republic
- Employees: 2,746 (July 2026)
- Annual budget: RD$20,902,618,809.00 billion (FY 2026); RD$17,938,366,655.89 billion (2021)
- Minister responsible: Eduardo Sanz Lovatón, Minister of Industry, Trade and MSMEs
- Deputy Ministers responsible: Daniel Arturo Peña Fernández, Deputy Minister of Foreign Trade; Rainiero Luis Martín Olivo Bordas, Deputy Minister of Internal Trade; Lucía Ynés Zorrilla Rodríguez, Deputy Minister for Free Zones and Special Regimes; Jorge Guillermo Morales Paulino, Deputy Minister for MSME Promotion; Gianna Franjul, Deputy Minister of Industrial Development; Anibelca María Mena Susan, Deputy Minister for the Promotion of Agribusiness
- Parent agency: Executive branch of the Government of the Dominican Republic
- Child agencies: See internal structure; See affiliated agencies
- Key document: Law No. 37-17 (in Spanish)
- Website: micm.gob.do (in Spanish)

The Ministry of Industry, Trade and MSMEs (Spanish: Ministerio de Industria, Comercio y Mipymes, MICM) of the Dominican Republic, is a government institution in charge of formulating, evaluating and supervising the country's policies, plans and projects related to industries, exporting, internal trade, external trade, industrial zones and micro, small and medium-sized enterprises (MSMEs). It also manages the country's oil reserves and other fuels.

This office appeared with its current functions on 1966 as the Secretary of State of Industry and Trade (Spanish: Secretaría de Estado de Industria y Comercio). Its headquarters are located at Santo Domingo. Its Minister is Eduardo Sanz Lovatón, since January 6, 2026.

== History ==
The origin of this Ministry is connected to the Ministry of Finance, found on the first Dominican Constitution, signed on November 6, 1844. This document specified that:

There will be four Ministers-Secretaries of State and of the following Departments: first, of Justice and Public Instruction; second, of the Interior and Police; third, of Finance and Trade; fourth of War and Navy.

— Constituent Assembly, Constitution of San Cristóbal, Title III, Chapter II, Section II, Art. 109

A few days later, on November 14, 1844, the office was officially created as the Secretary of State of Finance and Trade (Secretaría de Estado de Hacienda y Comercio), being its first ministre-secretary Ricardo Miura.

It wouldn't be until 1934 that an office specifically dedicated to industry and trade was created by Law no. 786, that established the Secretary of State of Labor, Agriculture, Industry and Trade (Secretaría de Estado de Trabajo, Agricultura, Industria y Comercio). This institution had many changes over the years, being split into two offices during 1959 and 1966.

On June 30, 1966, this Ministry was reinstated by Law no. 290-66 that created the Secretary of State of Industry and Trade (Secretaría de Estado de Industria y Comercio). This office was in charge not only of industry and trade, but also mining and energy.

It adopted the name Ministry of Industry and Trade (Ministerio de Industria y Comercio), after the 2010 Constitutional reform and the subsequent Decree no. 56-10 which changed the names of all government agencies.

On 2013, it lost its attributions on the energy sector and mining with the creation of the Ministry of Energy and Mines with Law 100–13.

Later, on 2017, this Ministry adopted its current name, Ministry of Industry, Trade and MSMEs (Ministerio de Industria, Comercio y Mipymes), with the reorganization of the institution by Law 37–17. This gave more weight to micro, small and medium-sized enterprises (MSMEs or Mipymes in Spanish).

== Internal structure ==
As the other Ministries of the Dominican Republic, the Ministry of Industry, Trade and MSMEs is subdivided into vice-ministries. These are:

- Vice-ministries of External Trade
- Vice-ministries of Internal Trade
- Vice-ministries of Industrial Development
- Vice-ministries of Development of Micro, Small and Medium Enterprises
- Vice-ministries of Free Economic Zones and Special Regimes

== Affiliated agencies ==
Some of the offices affiliated to this Ministry are:

- Dominican Institute of Quality
- National Office of Industrial Property
- National Board for the Promotion and Support of Micro, Small and Medium Enterprises
- National Commission for Defense of Competition
- Center of Industrial Development and Competitivity
- Dominican Center of Exports and Investment
- National Board of Exporting Free Zones
- Regulatory Commission for Disloyal Practices
- National Office of Copyright
- Dominican Board of Quality

== Evolution of the ministry's logo ==
2016–2020 (under the presidency of Danilo Medina)

2020–present (under the presidency of Luis Abinader)
