= José Rafael Abinader =

Dominican politician (1929–2018)

Senator for Santiago Province
- In office 16 August 1998 – 16 August 2002
- Preceded by: Eduardo Estrella
- Succeeded by: Víctor Méndez

Secretary of the Treasury of the Dominican Republic
- In office 1982–1984
- President: Antonio Guzmán
- Preceded by: Bolívar Báez Ortiz
- Succeeded by: José Santos Taveras

Personal details
- Born: 2 March 1929 Tamboril, Dominican Republic
- Died: 4 November 2018 (aged 89) Santo Domingo, Dominican Republic
- Party: Dominican Revolutionary Party (1947–1962); Dominican Social Alliance Party (1962-2014); Modern Revolutionary Party (2014-2018)
- Spouse: Rosa Sula Corona Caba
- Children: 4, including Luis Abinader
- Parent(s): José S. Abinader, Esther Wassaf

José Rafael Abinader Wasaf (Arabic: خوسيه رافائيل أبي نادر واصف; 2 March 1929 – 4 November 2018) was a politician, lawyer and writer from the Dominican Republic and Vice-President of the Dominican Revolutionary Party. He founded the Universidad Dominicana O&M, in which he was rector. Abinader as a businessman was president of Grupo Abicor.

Jose Rafael Abinader was the son of José S. Abinader, a Lebanese immigrant from Baskinta, Mount Lebanon, who arrived to the country in 1898, and Esther Wassaf, born in Monte Cristi to Lebanese parents from Baskinta as well. When he was 11 years old, his family moved from the town of Tamboril to the hamlet of Gurabito (located on the outskirts of Santiago de los Caballeros).

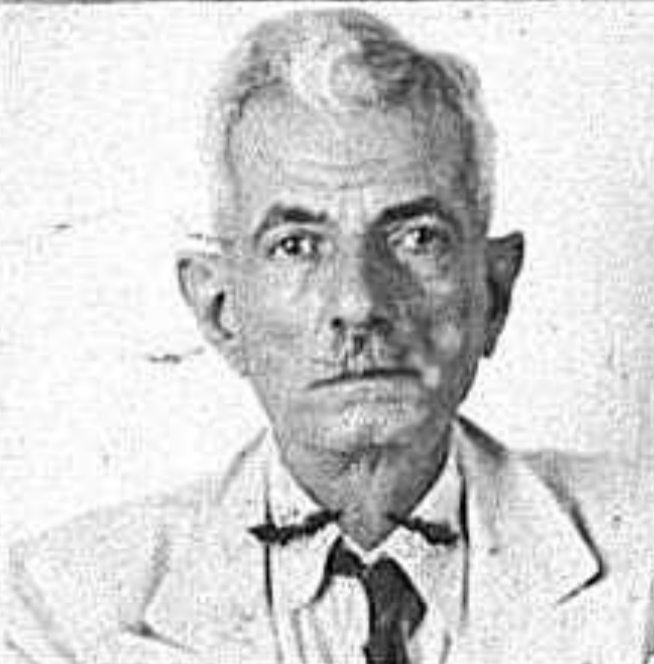
José Sesin Abinader, the father of José Rafael Abinader Wasaf (April 1945)

He studied law, and got a doctorate. He married Rosa S. Corona Caba, and had 3 children, among them the businessman and politician Luis Abinader.

Abinader was a member of the National Executive Committee (Spanish: Comité Ejecutivo Nacional) of the Dominican Revolutionary Party starting in 1963.

He was Secretary of the Treasury of the Dominican Republic in 1965 and from 1982 to 1984.

He founded the Dominican Social Alliance party (ASD; now the Modern Revolutionary Party or PRM); in 1998 he was elected Senator for the Santiago Province in an alliance with the Dominican Revolutionary Party.

Abinader was the ASD's presidential candidate for three times: 1982, 1990 and 1996. Thirty-four years after Abinader's first presidential campaign, his son Luis Abinader became the presidential candidate of that party (although renamed to the PRM) for the 2016 general election. and the 2020 general election, winning the latter.

== Works ==
- "Ideas económicas y sociales"
- "Comentarios acerca del ahorro"
- "Bosquejo de un estudio económico"
- "La corrupción administrativa en América Latina"
- "La sociedad bajo escrutinio"
- "Poemas antiguos"
