= Constitutional Court of the Dominican Republic =

Court interpreting the Constitution of Dominican Republic

Constitutional Court
- Tribunal Constitucional
- Established: 2010
- Jurisdiction: Dominican Republic
- Location: Santo Domingo
- Composition method: Appointed by the National Council of the Magistracy.
- Authorised by: Dominican Constitution
- Judge term length: 9 years, non renewable
- Number of positions: 13
- Website: www.tribunalconstitucional.gob.do

President
- Currently: Milton Ray
- Since: 12 January 2023

First Substitute Judge
- Currently: Rafael Díaz Filpo
- Since: 2021

The Constitutional Court (TC), created by the Dominican Constitution of 2010, is a constitutional court the mission of which is to guarantee the supremacy of the Constitution, defend the constitutional order and protect fundamental rights (art. 184 of the Constitution).

In order to comply with its powers, expressly conferred by the Constitution and the Organic Law of the Constitutional Court and Constitutional Procedures, No. 137-11, the Constitutional Court issues decisions which are final and irrevocable, and which, at the same time, constitute binding precedents for the public authorities and all the organs of the State. The Constitutional Court is autonomous and independent from the other branches of government and is vested with administrative and budgetary autonomy.

The TC has its headquarters in the municipality of Santo Domingo Oeste, province of Santo Domingo, in front of the Plaza de la Bandera, but may meet in any other place in the Dominican Republic.

== Powers ==
The Constitutional Court is competent to hear in sole instance:

- Of direct actions of unconstitutionality against laws, decrees, regulations, resolutions and ordinances, at the request of the President of the Republic, of one third of the members of the Senate or of the Chamber of Deputies and of any person with a legitimate and legally protected interest.
- Preventive control of international treaties prior to their ratification by the legislative body.
- To hear conflicts of competence between the branches of government, at the request of one of their holders
- To hear appeals for review filed against jurisdictional decisions that have acquired the authority of irrevocable res judicata after January 26, 2010, and in the cases provided for by Law 137–11;
- To hear appeals for review filed in relation to judgments issued in matters of amparo.

== Composition ==
The court is composed of thirteen magistrates, appointed by the National Council of the Magistracy for a single nine-year term and gradually renewed every three years.

Since 2021, the current composition is:

- Milton L. Ray Guevara (since 2011)
- Rafael Díaz Filpo (since 2011)
- Lino Vásquez Sámuel (since 2011)
- Víctor Joaquín Castellanos Pizano (since 2011)
- José Alejandro Ayuso (since 2018)
- Alba Luisa Beard Marcos (since 2018)
- Manuel Ulises Bonnelly Vega (since 2021)
- Justo Pedro Castellanos Khoury (since 2011)
- Domingo Antonio Gil (since 2018)
- María del Carmen Santana de Cabrera (since 2021)
- Miguel Aníbal Valera Montero (since 2018)
- José Alejandro Vargas Guerrero (since 2021)
- Eunisis Vásquez Acosta (since 2021)
