= Ministry of Higher Education, Science and Technology =

Ministry of Higher Education, Science and Technology may refer to:

- Ministry of Higher Education, Science and Technology (Dominican Republic)
- Ministry of Higher Education, Science and Technology (Kenya)
- Ministry of Higher Education, Science and Technology (South Sudan)
- Ministry of Science, Technology and Higher Education (Tanzania), succeeded (formerly the Ministry of Science, Technology and Higher Education)
- Ministry of Higher Education, Science and Technology (Zimbabwe)
- Ministry of Higher Education, Science and Technology (Indonesia)

== See also ==
- Ministry of Science, Technology and Higher Education, Portugal
