= Ministry of Education (Dominican Republic) =

Government ministry of the Dominican Republic

Ministry of Education of the Dominican Republic
- Ministerio de Educación de la República Dominicana (Spanish); MINERD
- Coat of arms of the Dominican Republic

- Current logo

- Ministry of Education of the Dominican Republic Headquarters (2026)

Agency overview
- Formed: November 30, 1934; 91 years ago
- Preceding agency: Secretary of State of Education and Fine Arts (1934–1965) Secretary of State of Education, Fine Arts and Religious Affairs (1965–1997) Secretary of State of Education, Education and Culture (1997–2000) Secretary of State of Education (2000–2010)
- Type: Ministry; Ministry of Education; Ministries of the Dominican Republic
- Jurisdiction: Dominican Republic
- Headquarters: 18.463133°N 69.908854°W Avenida Máximo Gómez, esquina Calle Santiago 02, Gascue, Santo Domingo, Distrito Nacional, 10201, Dominican Republic
- Employees: 265,741 (July 2026)
- Annual budget: RD$332,030,596,342.00 billion (FY 2026); RD$186,774,494,864.96 billion (2021)
- Minister responsible: Luis Miguel de Camps, Minister of Education
- Deputy Ministers responsible: Francisco Germán D'Oleo, Vice-Ministry for Teacher Accreditation and Certification; Oscar Amargós, Vice-Ministry for the Supervision and Control of Educational Quality
- Parent agency: Executive branch of the Government of the Dominican Republic
- Child agencies: See internal structure; See affiliated institutions
- Key document: Law No. 66-97 (in Spanish)
- Website: www.ministeriodeeducacion.gob.do (in Spanish)

The Ministry of Education of the Dominican Republic (Spanish: Ministerio de Educación de la República Dominicana, MINERD), is a government institution in charge of planning, managing and making the country's education system, as well as administering public schools and supervising private centers. By law, this Ministry receives 4% of the Dominican gross domestic product.

It appeared as its own entity on 1934 as the Secretary of State of Education and Fine Arts (Secretaría de Estado de Educación y Bellas Artes), although it wouldn't be until 2000 when it focused exclusively on education. Its headquarters are located at Santo Domingo. Its Minister is Luis Miguel de Camps, since February 3, 2025.

== History ==
Since 1844, Dominican education was in charge of the Secretary of State of Justice and Public Instruction (Spanish: Secretaría de Estado de Justicia e Instrucción Pública), which is nowadays the Office of the Attorney General of the Republic. On 1931, this institution was suppressed; its functions in the matter of justice were transferred to the Office of the Attorney General by Law no. 79, and its roles on education and Fine Arts were transferred to the General Superintendency of Education (Superintendencia General de Enseñanza).

Years later, on November 30, 1934, by Law no. 786, the Secretary of State of Education and Fine Arts (Secretaría de Estado de Educación y Bellas Artes) was created, thus replacing the term "public instruction" for education. On 1965, it will become the Secretary of State of Education, Fine Arts and Worship (Secretaría de Estado de Educación, Bellas Artes y Cultos) by receiving functions of the Secretary of State of External Relations. Later on, the office would be renamed as Secretary of State of Education and Culture (Secretaría de Estado de Educación y Cultura) by Law no. 66–97, which redefined the education system of the Dominican Republic.

It would adopt its current attributions on 2000 with the creation of the Secretary of State of Culture, by Law no. 41–00, thus becoming the Secretary of State of Education (Secretaría de Estado de Educación).

It adopted its current name, Ministry of Education (Ministerio de Educación), after the 2010 Constitutional reform and the subsequent Decree no. 56-10 which changed the names of all government agencies.

== Internal structure ==
Similar to other Ministries of the Dominican Republic, the Ministry of Education is subdivided into vice-ministries. These are:

- Vice-ministry of Teaching Accreditation and Certification
- Vice-ministry of Supervision, Evaluation and Control of Education Quality

Inside the Ministry, other offices are:

- General Office of Early Education
- General Office of Primary Education
- General Office of Middle and High School Education
- General Office of Education for Young Adults and Adults
- General Office of Special Education
- General Office of Counseling and Psychology
- General Office of Culture
- General Office of Evaluation
- General Office of Syllabus

Other departments and agencies are:

- National Office for Education Planning and Development
- International Cooperation Office
- Ministry of Education's United Nations Model
- Office for the Free Access to Information
- Purchase and Contracting Department
- Educational Radio-Television

== Affiliated institutions ==
The Ministry of Education has several institutions affiliated to it, dedicated to the well-being of students and teachers. These are:

- National Institute of Comprehensive Attention for Early Infancy (INAIPI)
- Dominican Institute of Evaluation and Investigation of Education Quality (IDEICE)
- Salomé Ureña Higher Institute of Teacher Training (ISFODOSU), named after Dominican educator and poet Salomé Ureña
- National Institute for Teacher Training (INAFOCAM)
- National Institute for Teachers' Well-being (INABIMA)
- National Institute for Students' Well-being (INABIE)
- Dominican Teachers' Health Risks Administration (ARS SEMMA)
- National Institute for Physical Education (INEFI)

== Statistics and publications ==
The Ministry of Education has a comprehensive list of data and statistics on its website. There you can find a map of all education centers in the country.

According to this website, the number of students by academic year was as follows:

Number of students per sector (2016-2021)
Academic year	Number of students	Public sector	Private sector	Semiofficial
2016-2017	2,749,144	2,069,929	672,758	51,557
2017-2018	2,736,697	2,051,250	637,940	47,507
2018-2019	2,807,279	2,090,436	669,287	47,556
2019-2020	2,761,118	2,058,675	655,371	47,072
2020-2021	2,388,553	1,969,632	384,302	34,619

== Evolution of the ministry's logo ==
2012–2020 (under the presidency of Danilo Medina)

2020–present (under the presidency of Luis Abinader)
