= Licelott Marte de Barrios =

Dominican lawyer, diplomat, politician, and accountant (1934–2019)

The Honourable Licelott Marte de Barrios

Chair of the Audit Chamber of the Dominican Republic
- In office 9 October 2008 – 4 February 2017
- Deputy: Pablo del Rosario
- Preceded by: Andres Terrero
- Succeeded by: Hugo Álvarez

Chair of Empresa de Transmisión Eléctrica Dominicana (ETED)
- In office 2008–2008

Deputy for the National District
- In office 16 August 2002 – 16 August 2006

Chair-Minister of Refinería Dominicana de Petróleo (REFIDOMSA)
- In office 1993–1996

Minister of Finance of the Dominican Republic
- In office 1990–1993
- Preceded by: Rodolfo Rincón Martínez
- Succeeded by: Florencio Lorenzo Silva

Personal details
- Born: Licelott Catalina Marte Hoffiz; 30 April 1934 Santo Domingo, Dominican Republic
- Died: 13 June 2019 (aged 85) Santo Domingo, Dominican Republic
- Party: Social Christian Reformist Party
- Spouse: Juan Amador Barrios
- Children: Brigadier General Mélido Juan de Jesús Barrios Marte, ERD
- Parents: Santos Mélido Marte Pichardo (father); Aurora Altagracia Hoffiz Pastor (1912–2013) (mother)
- Education: University of Santo Domingo
- Profession: Lawyer
- Awards: (Spain) Order of Civil Merit: Dame Grand Cross; (Argentina) Order of May: Grand Cross; (Chile) Order of Bernardo O'Higgins: Grand Cross; (France) National Order of Merit: Commander; (Colombia) Order of Boyaca: Grand Cross; (Dominican Republic) Order of Merit of Duarte, Sánchez and Mella: Grand Cross with Silver Breast Star
- Income: RD$ 325,174 monthly (2009) (US$ 9,030)
- Net worth: RD$ 24,420,946.57 (2009) (US$ 678,223.98)

Licelott C. Marte de Barrios (30 April 1934 – 13 June 2019) was a Dominican lawyer, diplomat, politician, and accountant.

== Biography ==
Licelott Catalina Marte Hoffiz was born on 30 April 1934 in Santo Domingo to Santos Mélido Marte Pichardo—minister of Defense in 1961—and Aurora Altagracia Hoffiz Pastor.

In her youth she was elected Queen of the Carnival of San Cristóbal and Miss Santiago.

She graduated in 1958 as Juris Doctor from the University of Santo Domingo, and has post-grades from the Pontifical Catholic University Mother and Teacher and Universidad Iberoamericana (UNIBE) universities. She was Minister of Finance from 1990 to 1993, Chair-Minister of REFIDOMSA from 1993–1996, and Deputy for the National District from 2002 to 2006.

Marte de Barrios served as the Chair of the Audit Chamber of the Dominican Republic from October 2008 to February 2017.

Licelott died on 13 June 2019, after being several days at a Dominican hospital fighting cancer.
