= Donald Guerrero =

Dominican politician (born 1958)

Minister of Finance
- In office August 16, 2016 – August 16, 2020
- President: Danilo Medina
- Preceded by: Simón Lizardo Mézquita
- Succeeded by: José Manuel Vicente Dubocq

Personal details
- Born: November 6, 1958 (age 67) San José de Ocoa, Dominican Republic
- Parent(s): Ángel Donald Guerrero Martínez, Francia Ortíz Arias
- Education: Instituto Tecnológico de Santo Domingo; University of Maryland
- Occupation: Economist, businessman, politician

Donald Guerrero Ortíz (born November 6, 1958) is a Dominican businessman, economist, and professor. Founder and CEO of Axis Automotive Group. He was the Minister of Finance of the Dominican Republic from 2016 to 2020.

== Early life ==
Guerrero Ortíz was born in San José de Ocoa on November 6, 1958. He is the son of Ángel Donald Guerrero Martínez and Francia Ortiz Arias.

He graduated in Economics from the Santo Domingo Institute of Technology, where he also completed postgraduate studies in Business Administration. Later, he completed a master's degree in Finance from the University of Maryland and a postgraduate degree in Banking and Finance from Chase Manhattan Bank, San Juan, Puerto Rico.

== Career ==
Guerrero Ortiz taught at various universities. He was a teacher of Microeconomics and Business Economics at the Pedro Henríquez Ureña National University (UNPHU). Additionally, he taught International and Corporate Finance at the postgraduate level at INTEC. He was professor of Business Strategy at the Pontificia Universidad Católica Madre y Maestra.

He is the founder and CEO of Axis Automotive Group, a leading dealership conglomerate in Puerto Rico. His journey in the automotive industry began in January 1996 with the acquisition of Pedro Gómez's Toyota Service facilities. Today, the company represents well-known brands such as Autogermana BMW, Autogermana Mini, Autocentro Nissan, Autocentro Chrysler, Dodge, Jeep, Ram, and Autocentro.

=== Minister of Finance ===
Through Presidential Decree 201-16, he was appointed Minister of Finance to replace Simón Lizardo Amézquita in 2016. He held the position until August 16, 2020. He implemented measures to guarantee and safeguard the country's financial health.

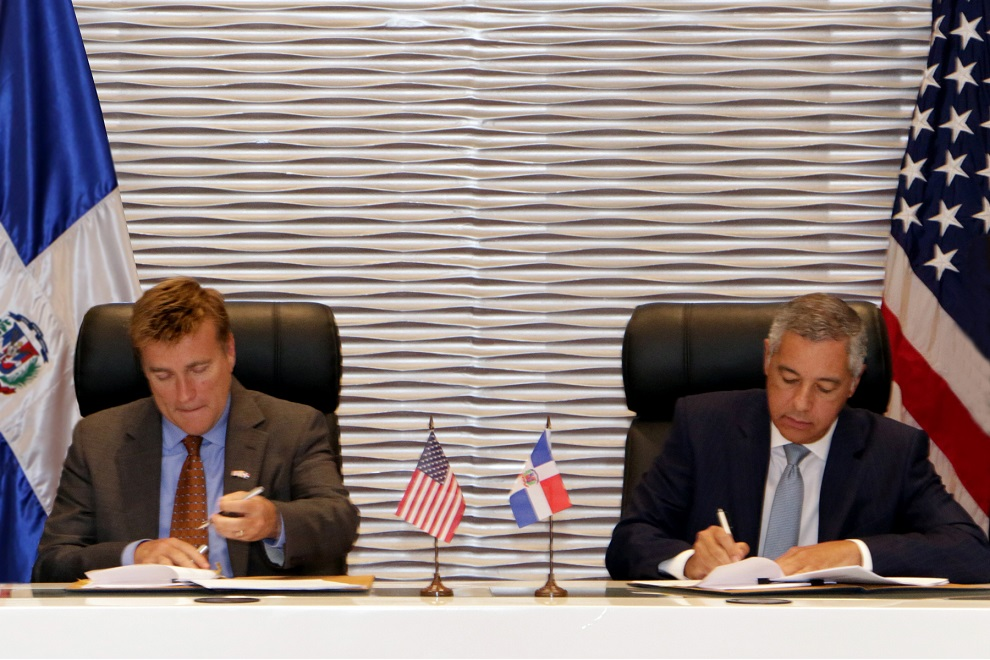

In his four years of management, he took the following actions:

- Economic stability: Before the COVID-19 pandemic, the Dominican Republic led economic growth in Latin America, Central America, and the Caribbean. In 2019, the country achieved gross growth of 5%.
- Transparency and the fight against tax evasion: In 2018, the Dominican Republic joined the inclusive framework of the project against the Erosion of the Tax Base and the Transfer of Benefits (BEPS, as part of the efforts to apply the highest international standards in terms of tax transparency and elimination of tax evasion.)
- Administration of public spending and management of public debt: Public spending in the Dominican Republic, before COVID-19, was one of the lowest in the region.
- Collection record: 100% coverage of the estimated collections in 2018 increased State income.

== Recognition ==
British magazine The Banker, from the Financial Times editorial group, chose Guerrero Ortiz as the 2018 Minister of Finance of the Year for the Americas.

He was among three prime ministers chosen in the “2016 Ranking: The Best Finance Ministers of Latin America” published by the main business, economy and finance magazine in the region, AméricaEconomía.
