= Milton Ray =

Dominican Lawyer & Constitutionalist

Milton Leónidas Ray Guevara

President of the Constitutional Court of the Dominican Republic
- In office 28 December 2011 – 28 December 2023
- Preceded by: Office created
- Succeeded by: Napoleón Estévez Lavandier

Minister of Labour
- In office 16 August 2000 – 16 August 2004

Senator for the province of Samaná
- In office 16 August 1998 – 16 August 2000
- Preceded by: Enrique Pujals Pierrot
- Succeeded by: Ramiro Espino Fermín

Personal details
- Born: 5 May 1948 (age 78)
- Spouse: Johanna Monagas
- Children: Angelisa, Milton François, Iraima Elizabeth, Charles David, Ariel de Js, Dianaira
- Parent(s): César Leónidas Ray, Ferolina Guevara
- Education: University of Nice
- Occupation: lawyer, judge and constitutional law expert

Milton Leónidas Ray Guevara (born 5 May 1948, in Samaná) is a Dominican lawyer, judge and expert constitutionalist. He was the first Chief Justice of the Constitutional Court of the Dominican Republic. In 28 December 2023 his tenure in the Constitutional Court ended and Napoleón Estévez Lavandier succeeded him as Chief Justice after being appointed by the National Council of the Judiciary.

He was elected senator for 1998–2002 by the Dominican Revolutionary Party, but he left the senatorial office when he was appointed Minister of Labour on 16 August 2000 and held that position until 16 August 2004.

== Early life and family ==
Ray was born on 5 May 1948, in Samaná to Mr. César Leónidas Ray, of African American descent, and Mrs. Ferolina Guevara.

== Academic studies ==
Ray graduated in law summa cum laude from the Mother and Teacher Pontifical Catholic University (PUCMM) in 1970. He then studied in Europe, graduating as Doctor in public law (mention très bien) from the University of Nice, France in 1975. He also gained a diploma of advanced studies (DEA) in social law from the Sorbonne in Paris, France (1984), and diplomas in comparative law from Strasbourg, France (1976); from the International School of Trieste, Italy (1976); and the School of Banking Law of Barcelona, Spain (1975).

== Curriculum vitae ==
- Professor of the Department of Juridical Sciences, PUCMM, 1970-2012 2020-Actuality
- Dean of students, PUCMM, 1971–1972
- Director of the Department of Juridical Sciences of the PUCMM, 1988–1997
- Director of the Mastery of Business Rights and Economic Legislation, PUCMM, 1993–1996
- Professor of Mastery in the Iberoamerican University, 2002–2011

== Chief Justice of the Constitutional Court ==
Ray assumed the presidency of the Constitutional Court on 28 December 2011, and was sworn in by President Leonel Fernández. At the time, some Dominican citizens, had accused Ray of unconstitutional behaviour. However, Ray has been defended by others in the Dominican Republic.

In November 2022, Ray was awarded an honorary doctorate by Universidad Acción Pro-Educación y Cultura (UNAPEC), in recognition of his career as a jurist, professor and magistrate and for his contributions to Dominican constitutionalism. In February 2023, President Luis Abinader formally recognised Ray's contributions over his career.

== Works and publications ==
- Doctrina Jurídica Dominicana: Un Aporte Personal (Editora Taller, 1990)
- Institucionalidad y Justicia, Vol. I (co-editor con la Licda. Lidia Cabral, Editora Taller, 1993)
- Institucionalidad y Justicia, Vol. II (colaboración de la Licda. Lidia Cabral)
- Institucionalidad y Justicia, Vol. III (colaboración del Lic. Eddy Tejeda)
- Separata de Doctrina: Ambiente Conceptual para una Legislación de Grupos Financieros Bancarios (Revista Ciencias Jurídicas, Pontificia Universidad Católica Madre y Maestra, 1998)
- Por un Samaná Mejor, Para un País Mejor (Gestión Senatorial 1998–2000)
- La Expropiación por Causa de Utilidad Pública en República Dominicana (tesis doctoral publicada en francés)
- La Guerra del Yom Kippur, Cese del Fuego, Superpotencias y Naciones Unidas (memoria para el certificado de Estudios Internacionales, Instituto de Derecho de la Paz y del Desarrollo)
- El Canal de Panamá y Las Naciones Unidas (memoria para el doctorado en derecho público)
- Los Extranjeros en la Seguridad Social (memoria para el Diploma de Estudios Avanzados (DEA))
- Opinión Constitucional (2014)

== Recognition ==
- Government of France, Grand Officer of the National Order of Merit, 1987
- Government of France, Officer of the Order of the Legion of Honour, 1999
- Order of the Merit of Duarte, Sánchez and Mella, Grand Cross Silver Plaque, 2004
