= O&M College =

Organization & Method College
- Organization & Method College
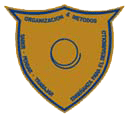
- Seal of O&M College
- Type: Private
- Established: 1966; 60 years ago
- Location: Santo Domingo, Dominican Republic
- Website: udoym.edu.do

Organization & Method College or O&M College (Spanish: Universidad Organización y Método) is a university in Santo Domingo in the Dominican Republic. It was founded in 1966 by José Rafael Abinader. It has campus in other cities as well, Santiago de los Caballeros, La Romana, San José de Ocoa, San Felipe de Puerto Plata, Moca, Santo Domingo Este.
