= Archivo General de la Nación de República Dominicana =

National archives of Dominican Republic

General Archive of the Nation
- Archivo General de la Nación

Agency overview
- Formed: May 23, 1935
- Type: National archives
- Jurisdiction: Dominican Republic
- Headquarters: 18°27′28″N 69°55′22″W Calle General Modesto Díaz 2, Ciudad Universitaria, Santo Domingo, Distrito Nacional, 10105, Dominican Republic
- Agency executive: Roberto Cassá, Director General
- Website: agn.gob.do (in Spanish)

The General Archive of the Nation (Spanish: Archivo General de la Nación) of the Dominican Republic is the country's national archive, decentralized from the Ministry of Culture. It is in charge of organizing and preserving all documents relevant to the history of the Dominican Republic.

It was created on 1935 by Law no. 912. On June 28, 2000, by Law no. 41-00, the institution was transferred to the newly created Secretary of State of Culture. Years later, on 2008, the Archive was given autonomy and became an agency of its own right, by Law no. 481-08.

Its headquarters are located near the University Zone of Santo Domingo. Its director general is historian Roberto Cassá, since August 16, 2020.

From its website, you can access a series of publications and digitized documents.

Among its departments, it has a library, a newspaper archive, a photograph archive, a conservation department, an investigation department, among others.

== See also ==
- List of national archives
- Ministry of Culture of the Dominican Republic
