= List of Dominican ministers of higher learning, science and technology =

The Ministry of Higher Learning, Science and Technology was created on 13 August 2001 by the law number 139 of the year 2001.

Before being elevated to the level of Ministry, a similar position was known as the National Council for Superior Education (Consejo Nacional de Educación Superior or CONES)

== List of secretaries ==
- Andrés Rafael Reyes Rodríguez: (2001-2004)
- Ligia Amada Melo de Cardona: (2004-???)
- Alejandrina Germán: (2016-2020)
- Franklin García Fermín: (2020-actualidad)

== See also ==
- Cabinet of the Dominican Republic
- Profile of the current Minister
