= Instituto Tecnológico de las Américas =

Las Americas Institute of Technology
- Instituto Tecnológico de las Américas (Spanish)
- Other name: ITLA
- Type: Public
- Established: August 2000, 15; 26 years ago
- Founder: Dominican state
- Rector: Jimmy Rosario Bernard
- Location: 18.451074°N 69.6627782°W Autopista Las Américas, Kilómetro 27, Parque Cibernético de Santo Domingo, La Caleta, Boca Chica, Santo Domingo Province, 11606, Dominican Republic
- Campus: Suburban, 0.27 km²
- Colors: Blue and red
- Website: itla.edu.do

Instituto Tecnológico de las Américas (English: Las Americas Institute of Technology, ITLA), is an institution specializing in higher technical studies in La Caleta, Dominican Republic.

== History ==
Founded in 2000 by the Dominican state, Instituto Tecnológico de las Américas (ITLA) is the only center specialized in technological education in the Dominican Republic.

ITLA offers an academic background that enables them to use technology as a catalyst for the social and human development of citizens.

ITLA's areas of expertise include Software Development, Information Networks, Multimedia, Sound, Mechatronics, Automated Manufacturing, and Computer Security. It also has the School of Languages and a Diploma in Data Science.

ITLA was formally constituted as a non-profit institution by Decree No. 422-00, dated August 15, 2000, issued by the former president Leonel Fernández, although the inauguration took place on August 13 of that year, considering the anniversary date of the institution.

In the first administration of the PLD government, 1996–2000, former president Leonel Fernández, Instituto Tecnológico de las Américas (ITLA) was inaugurated.

Currently, the institution is directed by Jimmy Rosario Bernard, who was appointed as rector of the institution by president Luis Abinader.
