= Ministry of Energy and Mines (Dominican Republic) =

Government ministry of the Dominican Republic

Ministry of Energy and Mining
- Ministerio de Energía y Minas
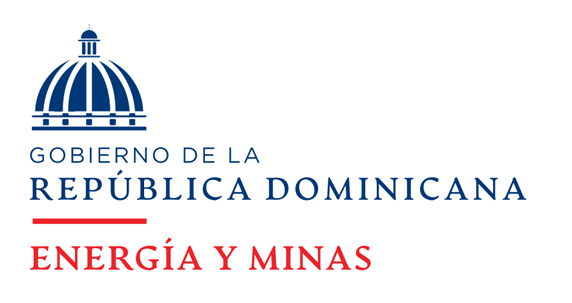

Agency overview
- Formed: 3 July 2013
- Jurisdiction: Dominican Republic
- Headquarters: Av. Independencia, Santo Domingo
- Annual budget: RD$ 1,524,638,866.40 (2021)
- Minister responsible: Antonio Almonte
- Website: http://www.mem.gob.do/

The Ministry of Energy and Mining (Spanish: Ministerio de Energía y Minas) of the Dominican Republic is a government institution in charge of the responsible development of the country's energy and mining sectors. Its main concern is to keep a reliable energy infrastructure and preserve an adequate exploitation of the country's minerals.

This office appeared on 2013 with its current name as a separate institution from the Ministry of Industry and Trade. Its headquarters are located at Santo Domingo. Its Minister is Antonio Almonte, since August 16, 2020.

== History ==
By 1920, electricity in the Dominican Republic was provided by foreign-investment companies. On 1928, the government created the Santo Domingo Electric Company (Compañía Eléctrica de Santo Domingo), given the first steps to the national electric system. Through 1954 and 1955, the Dominican government focused on acquiring companies dedicated to the generation and distribution of electricity, and created the Dominican Electric Corporation (Corporación Dominicana de Electricidad or CDE) on 1955 by Decree no. 555.

On 1966, with the creation of the Secretary of State of Industry and Trade (Secretaría de Estado de Industria y Comercio), all matters related to energy and mining were put under this office.

On June 4, 1971, Congress signed Law 146-71 about the mining sector.

On July 3, 2013, by Law 100–13, the Dominican government formally created the Ministry of Energy and Mining (Ministerio de Energía y Minas) as the regulator of the energy policies and the nation's mining.

== Internal structure ==
As the other Ministries of the Dominican Republic, the Ministry of Energy and Mining is subdivided into vice-ministries. These are:

- Vice-ministry of Government Energy Saving
- Vice-ministry of Energy
- Vice-ministry of Nuclear Energy
- Vice-ministry of Hydrocarbons
- Vice-ministry of Mining
- Vice-ministry of Energy Safety and Infrastructure

== Affiliated agencies ==
The Ministry of Energy and Mining has several institutions affiliated with it. These are:

- National Commission of Energy (Comisión Nacional de Energía or CNE)
- Superintendency of Electricity (Superintendencia de Electricidad)
- General Office of Mining (Dirección General de Minería)
- National Geologic Service (Servicio Geológico Nacional)

The Dominican Corporations of State's Electric Companies (Corporación Dominicana de Empresas Eléctricas Estatales or CDEEE) were dissolved and integrated in this Ministry in 2020.
