= Law of the Dominican Republic =

The Law of the Dominican Republic is somewhat complex.

Dominican law theorists make a fundamental distinction between primary sources of law, which can give rise to binding legal norms, and secondary sources, sometimes called authorities. The primary sources are enacted law and custom, with the former overwhelmingly more important. Sometimes, "general principles of law" are also considered a primary source. Authorities may carry weight when primary sources are absent, unclear, or incomplete, but they are never binding and are neither necessary nor sufficient as the basis for a judicial decision. Case law and the writings of legal scholars are as such secondary sources.

== Primary sources ==
Primary sources of law included enacted law, custom, and general principles. Enacted law includes legal rules adopted by the legislature, the executive, and administrative agencies. The various types of enacted law form a hierarchy with the constitution at the pinnacle, followed by legislation, then executive decrees, then administrative regulations, and finally local ordinances. Account must also be taken of the increasing importance of international treaties and conventions. Parliamentary legislation, including the Civil and Commercial codes, is today the principal source of law in the Dominican Republic.

While custom is technically considered a primary source of law, in practice, it is more often than not dismissed as of little importance. Custom (in the form of trade usage) plays a greater role in commercial law than it does in civil law generally.

It is sometimes said that "general principles", derived either from norms of positive law or from the existence of the legal order itself, are a primary source of law. They are characterized as such by some French and Dominican scholars in discussions of the judicial doctrine of abuse of rights and the expansion of the notion of unjust enrichment.

== Secondary sources ==
Authorities, or secondary sources of law, include case law (jurisprudencia) and doctrine. While case law plays an enormous role in the everyday operation of the Dominican law system, because of the necessity to interpret and apply the "written" law, its legal use is mainly limited to deciding particular cases. Judicial pronouncements are not binding on lower courts in subsequent cases, nor on the same or coordinate courts. As a practical matter, however, it is generally recognized in the Dominican legal system that judges do. It should take into consideration prior decisions, especially when settled case law shows that a line of cases has developed. Dominican judicial decisions have de facto weight to provide reasonable certainty and predictability; to meet the elementary demand of fairness that like cases be treated alike; and the related, but distinct, consideration that justice should not only be done, but should appear to have been done. Dominican courts commonly accept French case law as a source of law when the legal texts of the Dominican Republic and France are identical.

The writings of legal scholars (doctrina), like court decisions, are considered authoritative in the Dominican legal system. The role of doctrine is, however, quite different from that of the case law. While case law authority operates to settle the law and to assure a degree of consistency within a judicial hierarchy, scholarly writing exerts its greatest direct influence when the law is unsettled or when there is no established law on a point. Thus, the doctrine indirectly and to a great extent controls judges' understanding of case law. The weight attached by judges to doctrinal writing varies according to several circumstances, including the reputation of the author and whether the view expressed is an isolated one or represents the consensus of the most respected writers. In general, Dominican judges pay close attention to scholarly opinions (from Dominican as well as French sources), as expressed in general and specialized treatises, commentaries on the codes, monographs, law review articles, case notes, and expert opinions rendered in connection with litigation. Persistent doctrinal criticisms will often prompt re-examination of a holding and will sometimes even lead to the abandonment of an established judicial position.

== Dominican commercial law ==
Dominican law has given a commercial nature to all acts, operations, or activities carried out by business organizations. Therefore, in general cases involving corporations in the Dominican Republic, priority is given to the basic principles of the Dominican Commercial Code, enacted on July 4, 1882.

Dominican Commercial Law, whose primary source is the Commercial Code, has the Civil Code and trade customs as subsidiary sources. Many consider Article 18 of the Dominican Commercial Code to be the provision that legitimizes Civil Law as an important source of Commercial Law. However, there are important stipulations in the Civil Code that demonstrate the interdependence of the two texts, as, for example, Article 1107 shows.

== See also ==
- Legal systems of the world
