= Roberto Cassá =

Dominican historian (born 1948)

- Born: 12 September 1948 (age 78); Dominican Republic
- Occupations: Historian, writer, educator

Roberto Cassá Bernaldo de Quirós (born 12 September 1948) is a Dominican historian, writer, and educator. He serves as the president of the Dominican Academy of History and is a member of both the Academy of Sciences of the Dominican Republic and the Association of Historians of Latin America and the Caribbean.

Cassá is Director of the General Archive of the Nation.

== Biography ==
Roberto Cassá was born on 12 September 1948, the son of the Dominican lawyer José Cassá Logroño (Santo Domingo, 1916–† ?) and his wife María Bernaldo de Quirós Villanueva (Madrid, 1923–Santo Domingo, 2013), a Spaniard who migrated with her family in 1940 after the end of the Spanish Civil War to the Dominican Republic and whose parents and siblings, dissatisfied with Trujillo’s regime, moved to Mexico in 1947. He studied at the Colegio Santa Teresita; and graduated from the high school at the Lycée Manuel Rodríguez Objío.

== Career ==
In the year 1974 obtained his BA in History at the Autonomous University of Santo Domingo; in 1988 obtained a master's degree in Latin American studies History and a PhD in Sociology, both at the Autonomous University of Mexico. He was Professor of Social History and Social History Dominican Universal Tegnologico Institute in Santo Domingo from 1975 to 1985.

From 1987 he was employed as a professor of the Center for Economic Research and Teaching in Mexico, where he taught Economic History. He was also a professor of history at the Latin American Faculty of Social Sciences from 1986 to 1989. Was also a professor at the Autonomous University of Santo Domingo for over two decades.

He has participated in numerous projects of historical, sociological and economic research sponsored by private, state and academic institutions, he is also president of the Academy of the Dominican History and member of the Academy of Sciences of the Dominican Republic and the Association of Historians of American America and the Caribbean.

Academic offices
Preceded by José Felipe Chez Checo	Chairman of the Dominican Academy of History; 2001–2004	Succeeded by Emilio Cordero Michel
