= Ministry of Economy (Dominican Republic) =

Government ministry of the Dominican Republic

Ministry of Economy, Planning and Development
- Ministerio de Economía, Planificación y Desarrollo
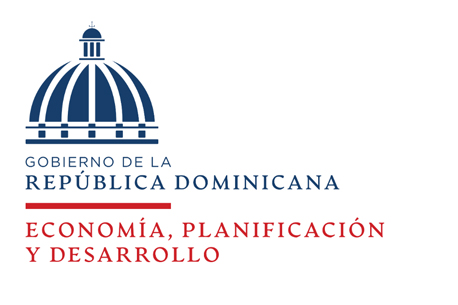

Agency overview
- Formed: December 28, 2006
- Dissolved: July 22, 2025
- Jurisdiction: Dominican Republic
- Headquarters: Av. México, Santo Domingo
- Annual budget: RD$ 2,438,494,144.12 (2021)
- Minister responsible: Pavel Isa Contreras
- Child agency: National Statistics Office
- Website: mepyd.gob.do

The Ministry of Economy, Planning and Development (Spanish: Ministerio de Economía, Planificación y Desarrollo or MEPyD) of the Dominican Republic was a government institution which coordinates the country's macroeconomic politics and sustainable development. It regulates the National System for Development and Public Investment, controls the statistics programs, evaluates the impact of economic actions, establishes the international cooperation politics, among other roles.

It was created on 2006 as the Secretaría de Estado de Economía, Planificación y Desarrollo. Its headquarters are located at Santo Domingo. Since July 11, 2022, its Minister is Pavel Isa Contreras.

== History ==
Since 1965, development and economic planning politics in the Dominican Republic were in charge of the Technical Secretariat of the Presidency (Spanish: Secretariado Técnico de la Presidencia). On 2006, the office was replaced by the Secretary of State of Economy, Planning and Development (Secretaría de Estado de Economía, Planificación y Desarrollo), as established by the Law no. 496-06 of December 28, 2006.

This process was the result of a legal transformation of the Dominican public administration, in order to strengthen the country's economic development. At the same time, the government reorganized the National System for Development and Public Investment (Sistema Nacional de Planificación e Inversión Pública) to face the economic and social development in an equitable manner.

It adopted its current name, Ministry of Economy, Planning and Development (Ministerio de Economía, Planificación y Desarrollo), after the 2010 Constitutional reform and the subsequent Decree no. 56-10 which changed the names of all government agencies.

== Structure ==
As all other Ministries of the Dominican Republic, the MEPYD is subdivided into vice-ministries. These are:

- Administrative-Financial Vice-ministry
- Vice-ministry of Economic and Social Analysis
- Vice-ministry of Planning
- Vice-ministry of International Cooperation
- Vice-ministry of Territorial Laws and Regional Development

== Affiliated institutions ==
Cooperating with the MEPyD in its roles, there are other offices affiliated with this Ministry. These are:

=== National Statistics Office ===
Its role is to collect, review, elaborate and publish the national statistics, including censuses.

=== José Joaquín Hungría Morell National Geographic Institute ===
It's responsible of formulating all politics related with Geography, Cartography and Geodesy.
