= Coat of arms of the Dominican Republic =

- Armiger: Dominican Republic
- Adopted: 6 November 1844 (altered at least 21 times)
- Motto: Dios, Patria, Libertad "God, Homeland, Liberty"

The coat of arms of the Dominican Republic features a shield in similarly quartered colors as the flag, supported by a bay laurel branch (left) and a palm frond (right); above the shield, a blue ribbon displays the national motto: Dios, Patria, Libertad (God, Homeland, Liberty). Below the shield, the words República Dominicana appear on a red ribbon. In the center of the shield, flanked by six spears (three on each side), the front four holding the national flag, is a Bible which is open to John: 8:31–32 with a small golden cross above it. The coat of arms appears in the center of the flag of the Dominican Republic.

== Official description ==
The constitution of the Dominican Republic describes the coat of arms as follows:

The National Arms have the same colors as the National Flag arranged in the same manner. It has in the center a Bible open at the Gospel of Saint John, Chapter 8, Verse 32, and above it a cross, issuing from a trophy of three spears and four national flags without arms, to both sides; there is a laurel branch on the left side and one of palm on the right. It is surmounted by an ultramarine ribbon, in which is written the motto "Dios, Patria, Libertad". In its base another, vermilion ribbon with its ends turned up with the words "República Dominicana". The shape of the shield is rectangular, with its upper corners protruding and lower rectangular, the center of its base ends with a point, and positioned in such a way, that drawing a horizontal line joining two vertical lines of the rectangle from where the lower angles begin results in a perfect square.

== Gallery ==
Arms under the House of Castile

The Habsburg arms, with half-arches added to the crown

Same arms, with crown's arches bent

Arms under the House of Bourbon

Lesser coat of arms of the Captaincy General of Santo Domingo

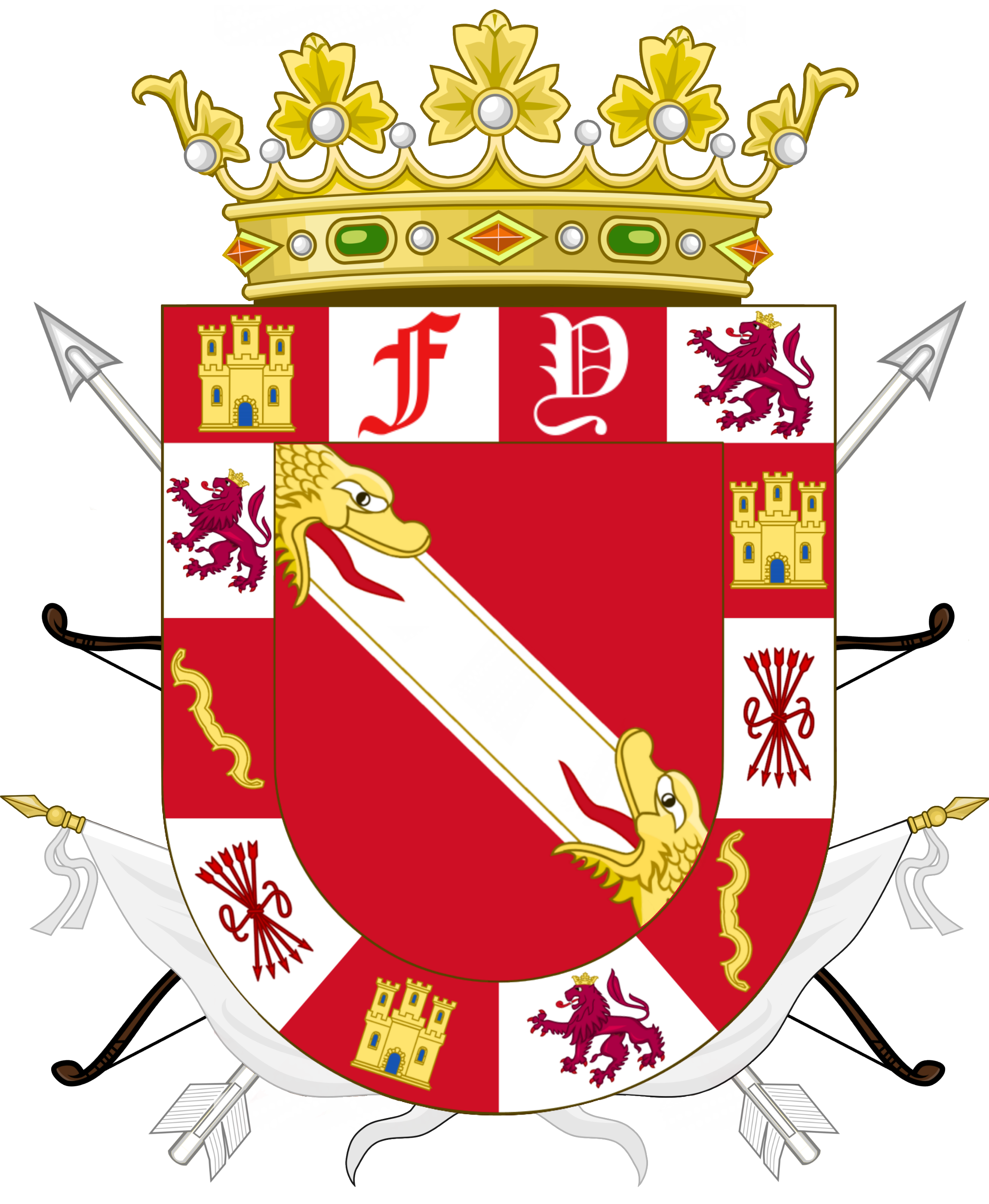
Greater coat of arms used during 1861–1865

First coat of arms used from 1844

Coat of arms from 1860

Coat of arms from 1913

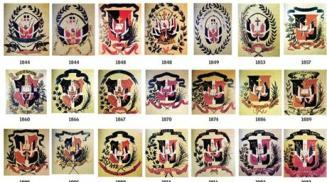
Evolution of the coat of arms
