= Constitution of the Dominican Republic =

Supreme law of the Dominican Republic

Overview
- Original title: Constitución de la República Dominicana
- Jurisdiction: Dominican Republic
- Created: November 6, 1844 (first constitution)
- Date effective: October 27, 2024 (current text)
- System: Presidential republic

Government structure
- Branches: Three
- Head of state: President of the Dominican Republic
- Chambers: National Congress: Senate and Chamber of Deputies
- Executive: President of the Republic
- Judiciary: Supreme Court of Justice and Constitutional Court
- Last amended: October 27, 2024
- Author: National Revisory Assembly
- Supersedes: 2015 Constitution

The Constitution of the Dominican Republic (Constitución de la República Dominicana) is the supreme law of the Dominican Republic. The country's first constitution was proclaimed on November 6, 1844, in San Cristóbal, several months after independence from Haiti.

Dominican constitutional history has been characterized by frequent amendment and republication of the constitutional text. Because amendments have traditionally resulted in the promulgation of a consolidated constitution, the number of Dominican "constitutions" is sometimes counted differently from the number of fundamentally new constitutional orders. The constitutional reform proclaimed on October 27, 2024 has been described as the fortieth modification of the constitutional text since 1844.

The current Constitution was proclaimed by the National Revisory Assembly on October 27, 2024, and published in Official Gazette No. 11170 on October 31, 2024.

== Constitutional history ==
=== Nineteenth century ===
The first Dominican constitution was proclaimed on November 6, 1844, shortly after the country declared independence from Haiti. It established a republican system with separation of powers, representative government and a catalogue of individual rights.

The original constitutional project nevertheless became the subject of conflict over executive authority. President Pedro Santana secured the inclusion of Article 210, which granted the executive broad emergency powers during the war for independence. Constitutional politics in the decades that followed frequently alternated between provisions favoring a strong presidency and more liberal arrangements intended to limit executive power.

Successive governments regularly revised or replaced the constitutional text. Although some reforms substantially altered the balance of political power, many consisted of comparatively limited amendments republished as a new constitution.

=== Trujillo era ===
During the dictatorship of Rafael Trujillo, constitutional institutions formally remained in existence, but the legislature and judiciary lacked meaningful independence and constitutional guarantees did not operate as effective restraints on executive authority.

The constitution was repeatedly altered during the Trujillo period, including changes connected with presidential terms and the institutional organization of the state. Constitutional forms therefore continued to be maintained even while political power was concentrated in the dictatorship.

== Constitutions after Trujillo ==
After Trujillo's assassination in 1961, constitutional changes provided for elections and the transfer of power to an interim Council of State. The Constitution of 1962 largely continued the institutional framework inherited from the Trujillo period.

In 1963, the government of President Juan Bosch promulgated a substantially more liberal constitution. It strengthened civil liberties, limited military participation in politics, addressed the social function of property and sought to reduce the power traditionally concentrated in the presidency.

Bosch was overthrown in September 1963, and the earlier constitutional order was restored. The demand to restore the 1963 Constitution subsequently became one of the central issues of the Dominican Civil War of 1965.

Following the civil war and the United States intervention, a new constitution was proclaimed in 1966 under President Joaquín Balaguer. It combined an extensive catalogue of rights with a comparatively strong executive branch.

The 1966 constitutional framework remained the basis of Dominican government for several decades, although it was repeatedly amended.

=== 1994 reform ===
The 1994 constitutional reform followed the political crisis generated by the disputed presidential election of that year. Among its principal institutional changes were restrictions on immediate presidential reelection, the establishment of the National Council of the Magistracy and changes to the presidential electoral system, including provision for a second round when no candidate obtained the constitutionally required majority.

=== 2002 reform ===
A further constitutional reform in 2002 altered the rules on presidential reelection, permitting a president to seek a second consecutive term. The reform was adopted during the administration of President Hipólito Mejía.

== Constitution of 2010 ==
A major constitutional revision was proclaimed on January 26, 2010, during the presidency of Leonel Fernández. In contrast with many earlier amendments, the 2010 Constitution substantially reorganized the institutional structure of the state and expanded the constitutional treatment of fundamental, social and collective rights.

Among the institutions established or constitutionally restructured were the Constitutional Court, the Superior Electoral Court, the National Council of the Magistracy and the Council of the Judiciary.

The Constitution maintained the Dominican Republic as a civil, republican, democratic and representative state and defined it as a "social and democratic state under the rule of law".

=== Fundamental rights and nationality ===
Article 37 declares that the right to life is inviolable "from conception until death" and prohibits the death penalty. The provision became significant in debates over the country's abortion laws.

Article 55 provides constitutional protection for the family and states that the government shall promote and protect the organization of the family on the basis of marriage between a man and a woman.

The 2010 Constitution also modified the constitutional rules governing nationality. Article 18 excluded from birthright Dominican nationality children born in the country to foreign diplomats, foreigners considered "in transit", and persons residing illegally in Dominican territory.

The latter provision was controversial, particularly in relation to Dominicans of Haitian descent. The Inter-American Commission on Human Rights noted that the 2010 Constitution expressly added children of foreigners residing illegally in the country to the categories excluded from nationality based on jus soli.

The nationality provisions later became central to controversy surrounding the Constitutional Court's 2013 decision TC/0168/13 and subsequent legislation addressing the status of people affected by the decision.

=== Criticism of the language and drafting ===
The language of the 2010 Constitution has also been the subject of criticism. Dominican lawyer and linguist Fabio J. Guzmán Ariza analyzed its drafting in his 2012 book El lenguaje de la Constitución dominicana, published by the Dominican Academy of Language.

Guzmán Ariza argued that the text contained extensive structural, syntactic, orthographic and lexical deficiencies and that legislation should be drafted in language that is clear and comprehensible to the general public. His study reported that 245 of the Constitution's 277 articles—approximately 88 percent—contained at least one syntactic, orthographic or lexical problem.

The book proposed measures including a legislative drafting guide, specialized training for legislative drafters, linguistic review during the legislative process and greater instruction in legal writing in law schools.

During the debate over the 2024 constitutional reform, Guzmán Ariza stated that many of the linguistic problems he had identified in the 2010 text had not been corrected in the 2015 amendment and also criticized grammatical problems in the proposed 2024 amendments. The Dominican Academy of Language offered to assist the executive and legislative branches with a linguistic revision of the constitutional text.

== 2015 constitutional reform ==
The Constitution was amended on June 13, 2015. The principal political change concerned presidential reelection.

Article 124 was amended to allow a president to serve a second consecutive four-year term but prohibited a person who had served two consecutive terms from subsequently running again for president or vice president.

A transitional provision applied the new rule specifically to President Danilo Medina, permitting him to seek reelection in 2016 while barring him from a later presidential or vice-presidential candidacy after completing the 2016–2020 term.

== 2024 constitutional reform ==
President Luis Abinader proposed another constitutional reform after his reelection in the May 2024 election. Law No. 61-24, enacted on October 2, 2024, declared the need to reform Articles 81, 166, 167, 169, 171, 178, 179, 209, 268 and 274, add a new Article 278 and modify transitional provisions.

The National Revisory Assembly approved the amendments, and the revised Constitution was proclaimed on October 27, 2024.

The principal changes included:

- reducing the constitutionally prescribed membership of the Chamber of Deputies from 190 to 170, comprising 158 territorial deputies, five national deputies elected by accumulation of votes and seven representatives of Dominican communities abroad;
- transferring the appointment of the attorney general from direct presidential appointment to the National Council of the Magistracy, acting on a presidential nomination, as part of reforms intended to strengthen the institutional autonomy of the Public Prosecutor's Office;
- replacing the attorney general on the National Council of the Magistracy with the president of the Constitutional Court and extending the council's appointment responsibilities;
- placing the existing two-term presidential limit among constitutional provisions that cannot be amended to permit further presidential terms;
- prohibiting elected officials from benefiting from constitutional reforms enacted during their own terms when those reforms concern the rules governing nomination, election or continuation in the office they hold;
- reducing the size of the Chamber of Deputies; and
- providing for the eventual unification of presidential, congressional and municipal elections.

Transitional provisions maintain separate municipal elections in 2028 but extend the terms of the officials elected that year until August 2032, allowing the electoral calendars to be unified thereafter.

A transitional clause also provides that the president elected in May 2024—Luis Abinader—may not again be a candidate for president or vice president after completing his second term.

International IDEA described the reform as strengthening institutional limits on presidential reelection and changing the method of appointing the attorney general, while also noting criticism from civil-society organizations that the process lacked sufficient public consultation.

The reform was challenged before the Constitutional Court. In December 2024, the court rejected an application seeking to suspend the effects of Law No. 61-24, holding that the constitutional-review procedure did not provide for the requested suspension.

== Constitutional amendment procedure ==
The Constitution establishes the procedures governing its own reform. A constitutional amendment must first be initiated through legislation declaring the need for reform and specifying the constitutional provisions to be considered. Congress then meets as the National Revisory Assembly to decide the amendments.

Certain fundamental matters are protected from ordinary amendment. Following the 2024 reform, Article 268 protects not only the civil, republican, democratic and representative form of government but also the constitutional rules governing presidential election and term limits.

Article 272 provides for an approving referendum when reforms concern certain constitutionally specified matters, including fundamental rights, territorial organization and other protected areas. The Constitution establishes thresholds for approval in such a referendum.

== Constitution Day ==
Constitution Day (Día de la Constitución) commemorates the proclamation of the first Dominican Constitution on November 6, 1844.

November 6 is recognized as Constitution Day under Dominican law. Under the country's statutory system for movable public holidays, the non-working observance may be transferred when the date falls on specified weekdays.

The holiday commemorates the first Constitution rather than the date of the most recent constitutional reform.

== See also ==
- Constitutional Court of the Dominican Republic
- Politics of the Dominican Republic
- Congress of the Dominican Republic
- Law of the Dominican Republic
- Constitutional law
- Human rights in the Dominican Republic
