= Faride Raful =

Dominican politician (born 1979)

- Raful in 2025

Minister of the Interior of the Dominican Republic
- Incumbent
- Assumed office 31 July 2024
- President: Luis Abinader
- Preceded by: Jesús Vásquez Martínez

Senate majority leader
- In office 16 August 2020 – 16 August 2024
- Preceded by: Rubén Toyota
- Succeeded by: Cristóbal Venerado Castillo

Senator for Distrito Nacional
- In office 16 August 2020 – 16 August 2024
- Preceded by: Reinaldo Pared Pérez
- Succeeded by: Omar Fernández

Deputy for the 2nd circunscription of Distrito Nacional
- In office 16 August 2016 – 16 August 2020

Personal details
- Born: Faride Virginia Raful Soriano; 24 October 1979 (age 47) Santo Domingo, Dominican Republic
- Party: Modern Revolutionary Party
- Children: 1
- Parents: Tony Raful (father); Grey Soriano (mother)

Faride Virginia Raful Soriano de Rodríguez ([faˈɾi.ðe raˈful]; born 24 October 1979) is a Dominican lawyer, communicator, and politician. She currently serves as Minister of the Interior and Police, a position she has held since August 16, 2024. She previously served as a deputy and senator for the National District, representing the Modern Revolutionary Party (PRM).

She is the daughter of politician and poet Tony Raful Tejada, recipient of the 2014 National Literature Award, and Grey Soriano de Raful, a lawyer and political scientist.

She studied Law at the Pontificia Universidad Católica Madre y Maestra. She subsequently earned a master degree in Telecommunications and Information Technology Law from Universidad Carlos III de Madrid. She also completed postgraduate studies in Information Law at the University of Salamanca and a specialization in Copyright and Related Rights at Universidad de los Andes, in Mérida, Venezuela.

In the 2016 congressional elections, she was elected deputy for Constituency 1 of the National District. She held this position from 2016 to 2020. In 2020, she was elected senator for the National District, a position she held until August 2024. During her final year in the Dominican Republic Congress, she served as vice president of that institution.

During this period, she chaired the Energy, Finance, Reform and Modernization, and Economy, Planning and Development Committees. She was also a member of the Justice and Human Rights Committee and the Interior and Police and Citizen Security Committee.

Legislative initiatives introduced during her time in Congress included bills and proposals concerning vaccination, transparency, public procurement, the protection of persons with disabilities, climate change, and cybersecurity. She also participated in the legislative process leading to the Territorial Planning Law.

By means of Decree No. 420-24, issued by President Luis Abinader, Faride Raful assumed the position of Minister of the Interior and Police on August 16, 2024.

During her tenure, she has focused on five main areas: Community-Based Public Order, through Local Security Committees and the Garantía de Paz program; Police Reform, including changes to officer training, a new patrol model, and the incorporation of technology; the establishment of Puntos VIDA, a network of assistance and protection facilities for women experiencing violence; Organized Crime and International Cooperation, through agreements with other countries and participation in regional security initiatives; and Institutional Management and Modernization.

== Life and career ==
Raful was born in Santo Domingo, to politician and poet Tony Raful (of Lebanese descent), winner of the 2014 Dominican Prize of Literature, and his wife Grey Soriano, a lawyer and political scientist.

She studied law at the Pontificia Universidad Católica Madre y Maestra; she obtained a master's degree in telecommunications law and information technology at Charles III University of Madrid. She has also studied at the University of Salamanca and the University of Andes.

Raful has worked as radio host and producer in Sin Tacones Ni Corbatas in 95.7FM La Nota and in Voces Propias of Z101. She has also worked as a TV host at NCDN.

In the 2010 congressional election, Raful was a Dominican Revolutionary Party candidate for deputy of the National District, but lost. Six years later, she ran again for deputy, this time for the Modern Revolutionary Party, winning a seat in the lower house of the Dominican Congress.

== Deputy for the National District ==
As a deputy, Raful attracted attention nationwide and in public opinion for her opposition role in the Chamber of Deputies. She exposed alleged irregularities in the financing of projects approved by the government and Congress, particularly those concerning the national electricity sector.

She became involved in the oversight of one of the most ambitious projects undertaken in the Dominican Republic by the Brazilian company ODEBRECHT: the Punta Catalina thermoelectric power plant. The company was linked to major corruption scandals across Latin America.

As a member of the Finance Committee of the Chamber of Deputies, she strongly criticized the Dominican government increasing public borrowing, which had been approved by a majority of Congress members, arguing that it placed the country economic sustainability at risk in the medium and long term.

Faride Raful was also a member of the Dominican Congress Justice Committee, where she advocated for women reproductive and sexual rights, as well as initiatives aimed at ensuring greater transparency and institutional oversight.

Deputy Raful also submitted a legislative proposal to reorganize the public administration, beginning with the proposed elimination of 57 institutions that, according to the proposal, increased the national budget and undermined the efficiency of the State. The proposal became the subject of national debate.

Within the Modern Revolutionary Party (PRM), following its closed internal primaries, she was elected national vicepresident, a position she was scheduled to assume the following May 13. She has criticized the teaching of religion in schools, defending freedom of belief and worship.

She was also a member of the campaign leadership team of Dominican President Luis Abinader, serving as deputynational coordinator for the Modern Revolutionary Party (PRM). As a communicator, she has been active in various media outlets as an analyst, presenter, and television producer. Her programs have included Oye País with Ruddy González, Enfoque Final on CDN, Enfoque Matinal, and Contrarreloj with Homero Figueroa.

She hosted the daily radio program Voces Propias, broadcast on Z101. She currently produces and hosts Sin Tacones ni Corbatas with Fabricio Gómez on radio station 95.7 FM (La Nota) and is part of the cast of the dailytelevision program Esta Noche en Mariasela, alongside Mariasela Álvarez and journalist Diana Lora.

== Senator for the National District ==
In the 2020 Dominican General Election, Raful was elected as the senator for the National District, beating Rafael Paz of the People's Force, And Vinicio Castillo of the Social Christian Reformist Party.^{[1][2]} She also became the spokeswoman of her party in the senate.^{[3]}

== Senator for the National District ==
At the beginning of her term as senator, Raful announced that the so-called “barrilito” a budget allocation that legislators receive and may use at their discretion for social assistance and political activities would be invested in creating a senatorial office, for which she would hire legislative experts.^{[4]}

This announcement prompted immediate criticism, since during the election campaign Faride had been among those calling for the elimination of this social assistance fund.

Faride Raful subsequently returned to her campaign position and announced that she would renounce any use of the controversial fund.

== Minister of the Interior and Police ==
During her tenure as head of the Ministry of the Interior and Police, Faride Raful has developed a work agenda focused on strengthening citizen security, preventing violence, and modernizing the institutions responsible for public order.

Her main areas of action have been organized around five pillars: police reform, community-based public order, the implementation of Puntos VIDA, the fight against organized crime through international cooperation, and institutional management and modernization.

These areas include measures aimed at strengthening the operational capabilities of the National Police, expanding protection mechanisms for women, promoting community participation in conflict prevention, reinforcing coordination with national and international organizations, and improving the Ministrys services and administrative processes.

=== Police reform ===
One of the main pillars of the administration has been the reform of the National Police, aimed at changing training processes, strengthening operational capacity, and expanding prevention and patrol activities. Changes implemented include extending the initial training period for police officers from approximately three months to one year of in-person training, followed by a second year of technical and professional education.

The New Service and Patrol Model was also introduced. It is structured around 15 operational protocols designed to organize police deployment, establish supervision mechanisms, and improve the distribution of officers throughout the country. Under the Plan 20 Mil, 11,874 new police officers had been recruited as of August 2026.

In addition, 8,573 officers were reported to have received training under the Basic Police Tactical System (SITAB), 8,000 body cameras were incorporated, and technological tools were introduced for recording detainees and analyzing police information. According to data from the Ministry of the Interior and Police, reported robberies in the four initial areas implementing the new model decreased by 35% between January and July 2026, compared with the previous reference period.

=== Community-Based Public Order ===
This area encompasses actions aimed at strengthening violence prevention and peaceful coexistence through community participation and coordination among public institutions. Its main initiatives include the Local Security, Citizenship and Gender Committees, Community Dialogue sessions, the Garantía de Paz 2.0 program, and the Comprehensive Intervention Program in Priority Neighborhoods.

The Security Committees bring together authorities, government institutions, and civil society representatives to identify problems, channel community requests, and follow up on commitments made in each locality. During 2025, 880 meetings were held and, between January and August 2026, 492 activities were reported across 546 validcommittees. Garantía de Paz 2.0 coordinates operations involving the National Police, the Public Prosecutors Office, the National Drug Control Directorate (DNCD), and the Alcoholic Beverage Control Program (COBA). These operations monitorthe permitted hours for the sale of alcoholic beverages, address noise pollution, and verify compliance with public order regulations. The program had been deployed in 52 territories.

The Comprehensive Intervention Program in Priority Neighborhoods includes prevention, mediation, public-space recovery, and territorial-control measures in ten sectors selected according to their security and community-coexistence indicators. Villa Agrícola was the first sector to receive intervention, followed by activities in otherlocalities. Community Dialogue sessions seek to establish mediation spaces with neighborhood associations, community organizations, and other social groups to identify and address conflicts before they escalate into violence.

=== Puntos VIDA ===
At the end of 2025, the Ministry of the Interior and Police launched the Puntos VIDA program in coordination with the National Police, the Ministry of Women, and the Office of the Attorney General of the Republic. The initiative consists of a network of public and private establishments designated to provide immediate assistance, temporary shelter, and referrals to specialized services for women experiencing violence.

Its implementation was extended to the public sector through Decree No. 683-25. As of August 2026, the network included 71 establishments across 17 provinces, of which 27 belonged to the private sector and 44 to the public sector. A total of 661 people had also received training to guide and assist those seeking help at these locations. The program aims to facilitate access to protection services and establish response mechanisms closer to local communities.

=== Organized crime and international cooperation ===
The administration has promoted cooperation and information-sharing agreements with other countries and specialized organizations to strengthen response capabilities against organized crime and transnational criminal activity. Agreements have been signed with El Salvador, the United States, Spain, and Belgium, concerning police cooperation, information exchange, and the coordination of security measures.

In 2025, the Dominican Republic hosted the Eighth Meeting of Ministers Responsible for Public Security in the Americas (MISPA VIII), during which it assumed the presidency of the Organization of American States (OAS)Subsidiary Technical Group on Police Management. Dominican participation in REDPPOL, a network for the exchange of police experiences and best practices, was also strengthened.

Another regional cooperation instrument was the 2025–2035 Roadmap to prevent the illicit trafficking and proliferation of firearms, ammunition, and explosives. It was adopted alongside Belize, Costa Rica, El Salvador, Guatemala, Honduras, and Panama, with support from the OAS, UNLIREC, and the Central American Integration System (SICA).

=== Institutional management and modernization ===
The modernization of the Ministry of the Interior and Police has included the digitalization of services, the updating of information systems, the simplification of administrative procedures, and the strengthening of administrative oversight mechanisms.

Among the changes in service delivery was the reduction in the processing time for firearm transfer licenses, from 45 days to approximately three hours. The renewal process was reduced from one hour and thirty minutes to 40 minutes. The S99 system was implemented for case management and the issuance of digital vehicle certificates, along with the ARCO platform for registering and monitoring detained persons.

Progress was also made in integrating information among more than 30 government agencies, with the aim offacilitating data exchange and improving investigative and decision-making processes. In July 2026, the Ministry obtained recertification under ISO 9001:2015 and updated its Anti-Bribery Management System in accordance with ISO 37001: 2025.These measures form part of the process of digitalizing and updating administrative procedures and the services provided to the public.
