= Prim Pujals =

The Most Excellent Prim Pujals

Senator for the province of Samaná
- In office 16 August 2006 – 16 August 2020
- Succeeded by: Pedro Catrain

Personal details
- Born: 26 July 1943 (age 83) Samaná (Dominican Republic)
- Party: Dominican Liberation Party
- Other political affiliations: Social Christian Reformist Party
- Education: Universidad Autónoma de Santo Domingo; Universidad Central del Este
- Committees: President – "Committee of Foreign Relations and International Cooperation"
- Ethnicity: White Dominican
- Net worth: ▲RD$ 16.30 million (US$ 441,000)

Prim Pujals Nolasco (born 26 July 1943) is a lawyer, judge, and politician from the Dominican Republic. He is Senator for the province of Samaná, elected in 2006, and re-elected in 2010.

Pujals has a Juris Doctor.

On 29 December 2018, video footage of Pujals emerged on Dominican news media (and spread on social media) where he was seen loudly threatening a bystander who confronted him when he allegedly tried to cut in line at a local bank. Pujals can be heard threatening to kill the unnamed man, and calling him a derogatory racial slur.
