= Valentin Medrano Pérez =

Dominican Republic politician

Dominican Republic Senator from Independencia Province
- Incumbent
- Assumed office 16 August 2020
- Preceded by: Juan Orlando Mercedes

Personal details
- Born: November 11, 1950 (age 75) Duvergé, Dominican Republic
- Party: Dominican Liberation Party

Valentin Medrano Pérez (born 11 November 1950 in Duvergé, Dominican Republic) is a Dominican Republic politician and teacher of the Dominican Liberation Party (PLD). Elected in 2020, he is currently serving as the Senator of Independencia Province.

== Early life and education ==
Pérez was born on 11 November, 1950 in Duvergé to Arquímedes Medrano Román and Isaura Pérez Heredia. He graduated with a degree in Pedagogy, with a minor in Biology and Chemistry, at the Autonomous University of Santo Domingo (UASD). He also graduated with a Bachelor of Law from the Universidad del Caribe, and received a master's degree in Cooperative Affairs from the University of Río Piedras, Puerto Rico, and specialized in Multiple Service Cooperatives at the University of Guadalajara, Mexico. He began his political life driven by the ideology of Don Juan Bosch, from the age of 12, following the general elections of 1962.

== Political career ==
He participated in the foundation of the Dominican Liberation Party (PLD). In 2019, he announced his decision to run for Senator of Independencia Province. In his campaign, he promised to implement the National Organic Development Law and enforce the Border Development and Protection Law 4801. He also promised to promote industrial development and create opportunities for tourism.

He is currently president of the Dominican Foundation for Social and Cooperative Development, Inc. (FUNDESCOOP), a non-profit institution that is dedicated to cooperative, social and community work throughout the national territory, working on the prevention of pregnancies in adolescents, the problem of sexually transmitted diseases, HIV/AIDS.

== Political positions ==
Pérez is a member of the PLD, a centre to centre-left political party. He opposes abortion and preventive detention.
