= Tommy Galán =

Dominican Republic politician (born 1967)

The Most Excellent Tommy Galán

Senate of the Senate of the Dominican Republic
- In office 16 August 2006 – 16 August 2020
- Preceded by: Aníbal García Duvergé (PRD)

Deputy for the province of San Cristóbal
- In office 16 August 2002 – 16 August 2006

Personal details
- Born: 26 April 1967 (age 58)
- Party: Dominican Liberation’s Party
- Committees: President – "Committee of Treasury"
- Net worth: ▲RD$ 105.625 million (US$ 1,950,000)
- Website: www.tommygalan.com
- Tommy Galán on X

Tommy Alberto Galán Grullón (born 26 April 1967) is a Dominican politician. He represented province San Cristóbal in Chamber of Deputies from 2002 to 2006, and has served in the Senate since 2006. A member of the Dominican Liberation Party, he was named President of the San Cristóbal Committee in 2001.

Galán is a businessman and politician from the Dominican Republic. He is Senator for the province of San Cristóbal, elected in 2006 with 52% of the votes, and re-elected in 2010 with 55.48% of the votes.

Galán has a Bachelor of Business Administration degree.

== Biography ==
Tommy Galán Grullón was born on April 26, 1967. He is the son of Vinicio Galán and Aura Grullón. His brothers are Vinicio, Anthony and Omar Galán Grullón. He is married to Dominic Fuentes, her daughter Gaia Galán Fuentes. He is also the father of Tommy Gabriel, Gabriel Alexander and Jean Gabriel Galán Salazar (children of a previous marriage).

At the age of 8, along with his parents and brothers, he emigrated to the Province of San Cristóbal in head municipality, where he received primary and secondary education in the Loyola Polytechnic Institute, standing out for its discipline and integration.

He has a degree in Business Administration from the APEC Dominican University, in the year 1989.

== Dominican Liberation Party (PLD) ==
He joined the Dominican Liberation Party (PLD) in 1991, starting as a member. In 1993 he was the publicity secretary of the Municipal Directorate of the PLD, later deputy secretary of the Sports Secretary of the PLD. Later he was president of the Provincial Committee of Saint Christopher of the Dominican Liberation Party. He was elected as deputy to Congress National by the Province of San Cristóbal in the period 2002-2006, becoming a member of the Finance, Telecommunications, Budget and External Debt Commissions. Then enter the PLD Central Committee.

== Senator for the National District (2006) ==
In 2006 he was elected as Senator of the Province of San Cristobal by the Dominican Liberation Party (PLD), for a period of four years. In the congressional and municipal elections of 2010, Tommy Galán Grullón was presented again as candidate for Senator of the San Cristóbal Province by the PLD and its allies, resulting winner and reelected as Senator for San Cristóbal, for the period 2010-2016, with more than fifty per cent of the votes cast.

Galán held the presidency of the Permanent Commission of Finance, member of the Permanent Commission of Defense and Security, member of the Permanent Commission of Economy, Planning and Development, member of the Permanent Commission of Industry, Commerce and Free Zones, member of the Commission Permanent Minister of the Interior and Police and Citizen Security, member of the Permanent Commission for Modernization and Reform, member of the Permanent Committee on Budget and member of the Permanent Commission for Transport and Telecommunications in the Senate of the Dominican Republic, during the period 2006-2010, 2010-2014 and 2014 to present.
