= Arístides Victoria Yeb =

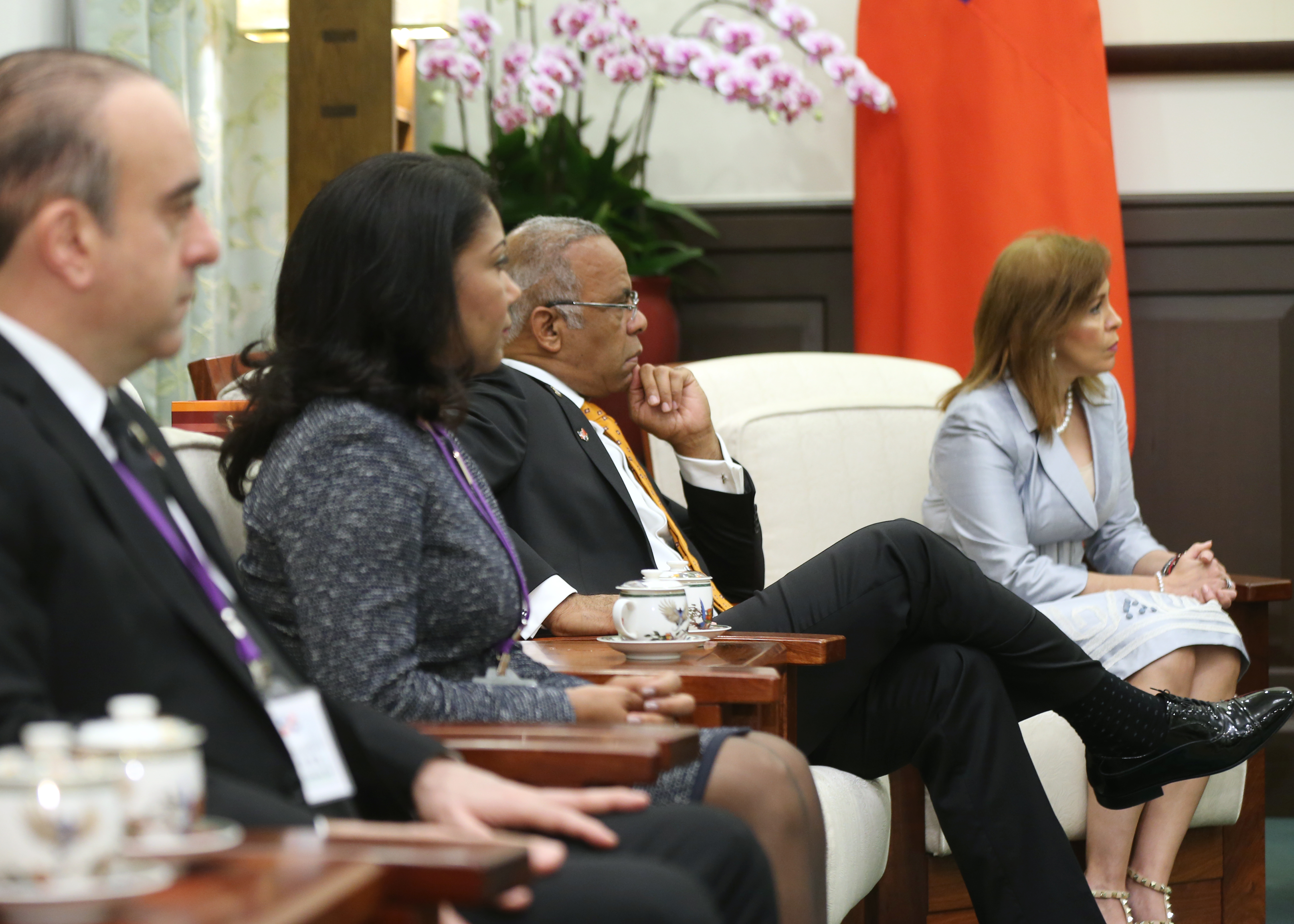
- Senator Victoria (left) with other Dominican senators at an official trip to Taiwan (June 2017)

National Senator for the Province of María Trinidad Sánchez
- In office 16 August 2010 – 16 August 2020
- Preceded by: Jesús "Chu" Vásquez Martínez
- Succeeded by: Alexis Victoria Yeb

Personal details
- Born: 18 June 1966 Nagua, Dominican Republic
- Party: Dominican Liberation’s Party
- Spouse: Jeannette Virginia Díaz Peláez
- Relations: Eladio Victoria (great-granduncle); Alexis Victoria Yeb (double cousin)
- Children: 2
- Parent(s): Arístides Victoria José, Lourdes Yeb Rapozo
- Ethnicity: White Dominican
- Net worth: RD$ 9.67 million (2010) (US$ 262,000)

Arístides Victoria Yeb (born 18 June 1966) is a politician from the Dominican Republic.

== Early life, family and education ==
Victoria Yeb was born to Lourdes Yeb Raposo, of Lebanese and Portuguese ancestry, and Arístides Victoria José, Vice Minister of Labor of the Dominican Republic, of French and Lebanese descent.

He graduated with a BA in Law at the Pedro Henríquez Ureña National University.

== Political career ==
Victoria was elected Senator for the Province of María Trinidad Sánchez in 2010, for a six-years-term. Previously, he was governor of María Trinidad Sánchez from August 2006 to August 2010, and Vice Minister of Interior and Police from August 2004 to August 2006.

He was described as one of the most hardworking senators.

Victoria Yeb was succeeded in the senatorship by Alexis Victoria Yeb, his political rival and double cousin.
