= Félix Vásquez =

The Most Excellent Félix Vásquez

Senator for the province of Sánchez Ramírez
- In office 16 August 2006 – 16 August 2020
- Preceded by: Pedro Luna (PRD)
- Succeeded by: Ricardo de los Santos (PRM)

Deputy
- In office 2004 – 16 August 2006

Secretary of State and Advisor on Rice affairs of the Executive Power
- President: Joaquín Balaguer

Personal details
- Born: 5 April 1943 (age 83) Loma de Cabrera, Dajabón Province, Dominican Republic
- Party: Dominican Revolutionary Party
- Other political affiliations: Social Christian Reformist Party
- Spouse: Marcia Altagracia Amparo Puigvert
- Children: 5
- Parent(s): Vidal Vásquez, Elisa Espinal
- Education: Colegio San Ignacio de Loyola (Master's degree in Farming)
- Occupation: Businessman, politician
- Profession: Agriculturist
- Committees: President – "Committee on Higher Education, Science and Technology"
- Ethnicity: White Dominican
- Net worth: ▲RD$ 124.69 million (2010) (US$ 3.37 million)

Félix María Vásquez Espinal (born 5 April 1943) is a businessman, philanthropist, and politician from the Dominican Republic. He is Senator for the province of Sánchez Ramírez, elected in 2006, and re-elected in 2010 with 55.14% of the votes.

Vásquez was born into a poor family. He and a brother won a scholarship that allowed them to study in a college. He graduated with a Master's degree in Farming and joined the Dominican Air Force in the Early 1960s. In 1964 he moved to Cotuí, Sánchez Ramírez, to work in the branch of the state-owned Agricultural Bank, five years later, he started a private business. In 1995, he founded the Fundación Félix Vásquez foundation. He has been Secretary of State-Advisor and Deputy.
