= Adriano Sánchez Roa =

The Most Excellent Adriano Sánchez Roa

Senator for the province of Elías Piña
- Incumbent
- Assumed office 16 August 2006
- Preceded by: Manuel Ramírez Pérez (PRD)

Administrator-General of the Banco Agrícola
- In office 1994–1996

Personal details
- Born: 24 January 1956 (age 70) Comendador, Elías Piña
- Party: Dominican Liberation Party
- Other political affiliations: Social Christian Reformist Party
- Children: Stalin Sánchez. Vladimir Sánchez Nathalia Sánchez Adrián Sánchez Nathaly Sánchez Ananti Sánchez.
- Parent: Manuel Roa Roberto Sánchez
- Education: Instituto Tecnológico de Santo Domingo, Universidad de Panamá
- Occupation: politico
- Profession: economista, político, agrónomo
- Committees: President – "Committee on Monitoring, Control and Evaluation of the Parliamentary Agenda"
- Net worth: ▲RD$ 10.56 million (2010) (US$ 285,000)
- Adriano Sánchez Roa on X

Adriano de Jesús Sánchez Roa (born 24 January 1956) is a politician, economist and writer from the Dominican Republic. He is Senator for the province of Elías Piña, elected in 2006, and re-elected in 2010, with 60.05% of the votes.

He has been described as one of the most hardworking senators.

== Works ==
- "Influencias de las Leyes Agrarias en el Cultivo del Arroz" (1981)
- "Café: Situación y Perspectivas" (1984)
- "La Crisis Arrocera" (1985)
- "La Reforma Agraria no ha llenado las Expectativas Creadas a Familias Campesinas" (1986)
- "Políticas Inflacionarias en los Productos Alimenticios de Origen Agropecuario" (1986)
- "Determinantes Estructurales en la Producción Cacaotalera" (1986)
- "Los Intermediarios en 25 Rubros Agropecuarios" (1987)
- "La Inflación en el Sector Agropecuario" (1988)
- "Consecuencias de la Insuficiencia del Crédito Estatal en el Agro". (1988)
- "Campesinos, Crisis Agropecuaria e Inflación" (1989)
- "En Tiempos Caracoles" (1990)
- "Los Dueños del Café" (1990)
- "FMI, Agricultura y Pobreza" (1991)
- "Los Desamparados de la Tierra: 30 años de Reforma Agraria" (1992)
- "Cuando el Amor Nace en Primavera" (1996)
- "Pensamiento Social Agrario de Joaquín Balaguer" (1997)
- "Los Amores Inmortales" (1999)
- "Capilla Sin Dios" (1999)
- "Otros Cuentos en el Mismo Exilio" (1999)
- "El Amor en el Rocío de la Noche"
- "Eloísa Quiere Casarse" (2004)
- "Contigo Voy a la Gloria" (2005)
