= Cristina Lizardo =

Dominican Republic politician (born 1959)

The Most Excellent Cristina Lizardo
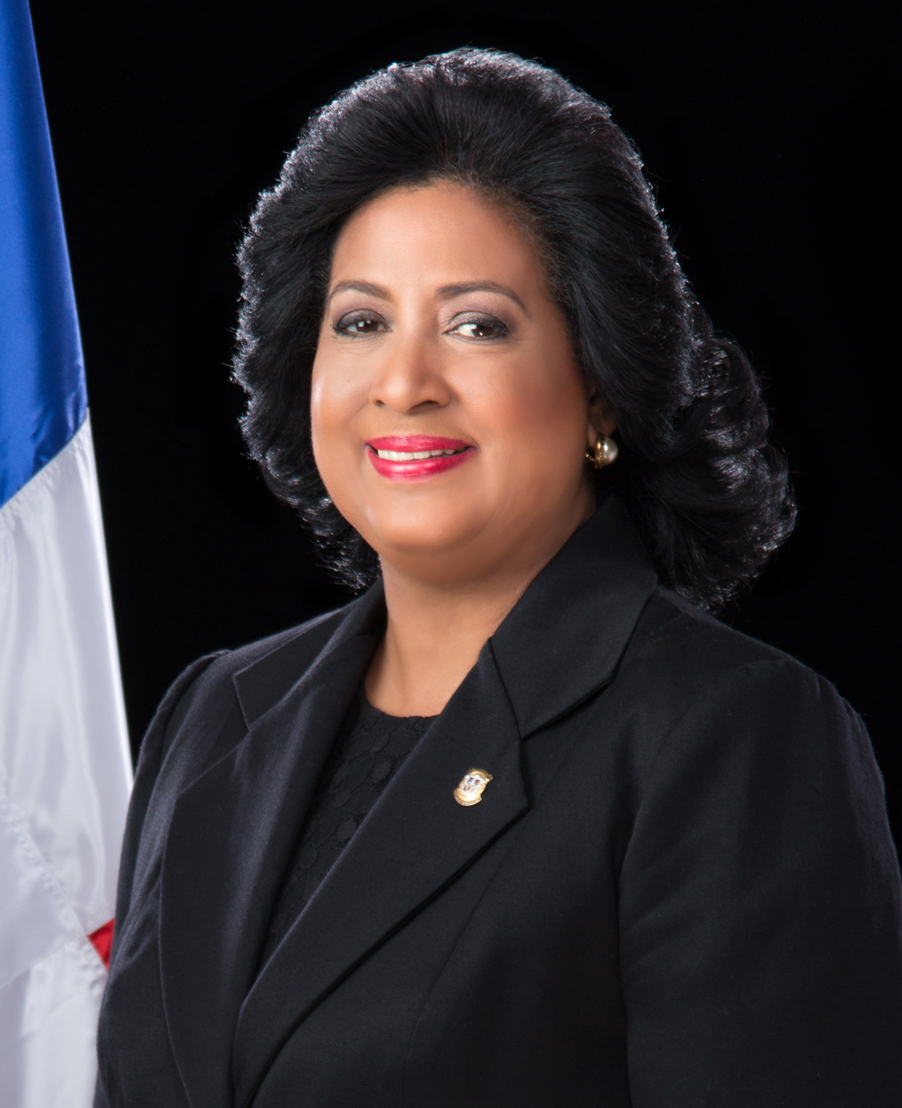

President of the Senate of the Dominican Republic
- In office 16 August 2014 – 16 August 2016
- President: Danilo Medina
- Preceded by: Reinaldo Pared Pérez (Dominican Liberation’s Party)
- Succeeded by: Reinaldo Pared Pérez (Dominican Liberation’s Party)

Senator for the province of Santo Domingo
- In office 16 August 2006 – 16 August 2020
- Preceded by: César Rutinel (Dominican Revolutionary Party)
- Succeeded by: Antonio Taveras (Modern Revolutionary Party)

Deputy for the province of Santo Domingo
- In office 16 August 2002 – 16 August 2006

Deputy for the National District
- In office 16 August 1998 – 16 August 2002

Personal details
- Born: 20 January 1959 (age 67)
- Party: Dominican Liberation’s Party (1978–present)
- Spouse: Freddy Antonio Madera Durán
- Children: Noelia, Natalia
- Parent(s): Simón Lizardo Cabrera (father), Mercedes Mézquita (mother)
- Education: Universidad Autónoma de Santo Domingo
- Occupation: Politician
- Profession: Teacher
- Net worth: ▼RD$ 11.80 million (2010) (▼US$ 0.32 million)
- Website: http://www.cristinalizardo.com.do/

Cristina Altagracia Lizardo Mézquita (born 20 January 1959) is a politician and academic from the Dominican Republic. She was Senator for the province of Santo Domingo from 2006 to 2020. Lizardo became the first woman to preside the Senate and the Congress of the Dominican Republic.

== Early life ==
Lizardo was born on 20 January 1959 in San Juan de la Maguana, which was then part of the San Juan Province in the Dominican Republic. She is the daughter of Simón Lizardo Cabrera, a public accountant, and Enoe Mercedes Mézquita. She had three other siblings: Simón, who was the former general manager of the Reserve Bank of the Dominican Republic, Elizabeth, and Juan.

Wanting to enter the vocation of being an educator, she moved to Santo Domingo for her education. She obtained a degree in education from the Autonomous University of Santo Domingo. In 1978 she joined the Dominican Liberation Party.

== Political career ==
In 1990 she took on her first position, becoming councilor of the City Council of the Distrito Nacional, which she did for two terms, leaving her seat in 1998. In addition, from 1996 to 1998 she was an administrative undersecretary in the Dominican government. Afterwards, from 1998 to 2006, she was a Deputy in the Congress of the Dominican Republic.

== Personal life ==
In 2007, she was diagnosed with breast cancer. She had a successful mastectomy and survived the disease. She is married to Freddy Antonio Madera Durán, with whom she has two daughters: Natalia and Noelia.

In her 2010 sworn statement of assets, she indicated that her net worth was RD$ 11.8 million.

Political offices
Preceded by Reinaldo Pared Pérez	President of the Senate of the Dominican Republic; 16 August 2014–16 August 2016	Succeeded by Reinaldo Pared Pérez
Preceded by César Rutinel	Senator for the Province of Santo Domingo; 16 August 2006–present	Incumbent
