= Amílcar Romero =

Dominican agronomist (born 1948)

Senator for the province of Duarte
- Incumbent
- Assumed office 16 August 2006
- Preceded by: Julio González (PRD)

Secretary of State of Agriculture
- In office 16 August 2004 – 16 August 2006
- President: Leonel Fernández

Secretary of State of Agriculture
- In office 17 August 1998 – 16 August 2000
- President: Leonel Fernández

Personal details
- Born: 16 October 1948 (age 77) San Francisco de Macorís (Dominican Republic)
- Party: Dominican Liberation’s Party
- Spouse: Saskia Altagracia Jorge García
- Children: Jean Amílcar Romero Shiara Romero
- Parent(s): Rafael Romero, Mercedes Portuondo
- Committees: President – "Committee of Agriculture and Agroindustrial Affairs"
- Ethnicity: White Dominican
- Net worth: ▲RD$ 35.83 million (2010) (▼US$ 0.97 million)

Almílcar Jesús Romero Portuondo (born 16 October 1948) is an agronomist and politician from the Dominican Republic. He is Senator for the province of Duarte, elected in 2006, and re-elected in 2010.

Invested Doctor Honoris Causa in 2006 by the Universidad Católica Nordestana.
