= Juan Orlando Mercedes =

The Most Excellent Juan Orlando Mercedes

Senator for the province of Independencia
- In office 16 August 2006 – 15 August 2020
- Preceded by: Dagoberto Rodríguez (PRD)
- Succeeded by: Valentin Medrano Pérez

Governor-Civilian of Independencia Province
- In office 2004–2006

Personal details
- Born: 16 June 1957 (age 68) Duvergé, Independencia Province, Dominican Republic
- Party: Dominican Liberation’s Party
- Profession: Electromechanical engineer
- Committees: President – "Committee on Energy Affairs"
- Net worth: ▲RD$ 24.25 million (2010) (US$ 656,000)

Juan Orlando Mercedes Sena (born 16 June 1957) is a politician and engineer from the Dominican Republic. He is Senator for the province of Independencia, elected in 2006, and re-elected in 2010 with 68% of the votes —the highest percentage achieved for a Senator. He was also president of the Energy Commission.

Mariotti was Governor-Civilian of Independencia from 1998 to 2000 and from 2004 to 2006
