= Luis René Canaán =

The Most Excellent Luis R. Canaán

Senator for the province of Hermanas Mirabal
- Incumbent
- Assumed office 15 November 2007
- Preceded by: (Renaming of province)
- Succeeded by: (incumbent)

Senator for the province of Salcedo
- In office 16 August 2006 – 15 November 2007
- Preceded by: Alejandro Santos (PRD)
- Succeeded by: (Renaming of province)

Personal details
- Born: 21 September 1949 (age 76)
- Party: Dominican Liberation’s Party
- Spouse: Judith García Pantaleón
- Children: 2
- Parent(s): Luis René Canaán Gil (father); María Antonia Rojas Tabar (mother)
- Education: Santo Domingo Institute of Technology
- Profession: Physician
- Committees: President – "Public Health" Vice President – "Social Security, Labour and Pensions"; Secretary – "Defence and National Security"; Member – "Youth" Member – "Natural Resources and Environment"
- Net worth: RD$ 23.3 million (2010) (US$ 630,000)

Luis René Canaán Rojas is a medic, marine and politician from the Dominican Republic. He is Senator for the province of Hermanas Mirabal and was elected in 2006, and re-elected in 2010 and 2016; and has served in the Dominican Navy.

Canaán has a Doctorate of Medicine from the Santo Domingo Institute of Technology.

== Super Tucano corruption scandal ==
In August 2016, Senator Canaán was accused of taking 3 million dollars as a bribe from Brazilian entrepreneurs to influence in the bidding for purchase of military aircraft, favoring Embraer over its American competitors. The Dominican Congress passed in 2009 a 94 million-dollar deal for the purchase of 8 Embraer EMB 314 Super Tucano attack warplanes with a loan from the Brazilian bank BNDES.

It was known for years that a Leonelist senator was implicated in the corruption scheme, but it was in August 2016 when his name was finally revealed.

Beside Senator Canaán, two high-rank military officers, Air Vice-marshal Pedro Rafael Peña, who was defense minister during the presidency of Leonel Fernández, and Colonel Carlos Ramón Piccini, were formally accused and arrested. Senator Canaán, who enjoys parliamentary immunity, has not been indicted nor arrested.

Judicial authorities informed that the inquest is part of an investigation led by the United States and Brazil.

The United States Federal Reserve has been investigating Embraer since 2010 due to a possible violation of the Foreign Corrupt Practices Act.

In 2011, it was revealed that almost 17 million dollars were diverted illegally.

== See also ==
- Operation Car Wash
