= Félix Bautista =

Félix Bautista may refer to:

- Félix Bautista (politician) (born 1963), member of the Senate of the Dominican Republic
- Félix Bautista (baseball) (born 1995), Dominican baseball pitcher for the Baltimore Orioles
