= Félix Bautista (politician) =

Senator of the Dominican Republic since 2010

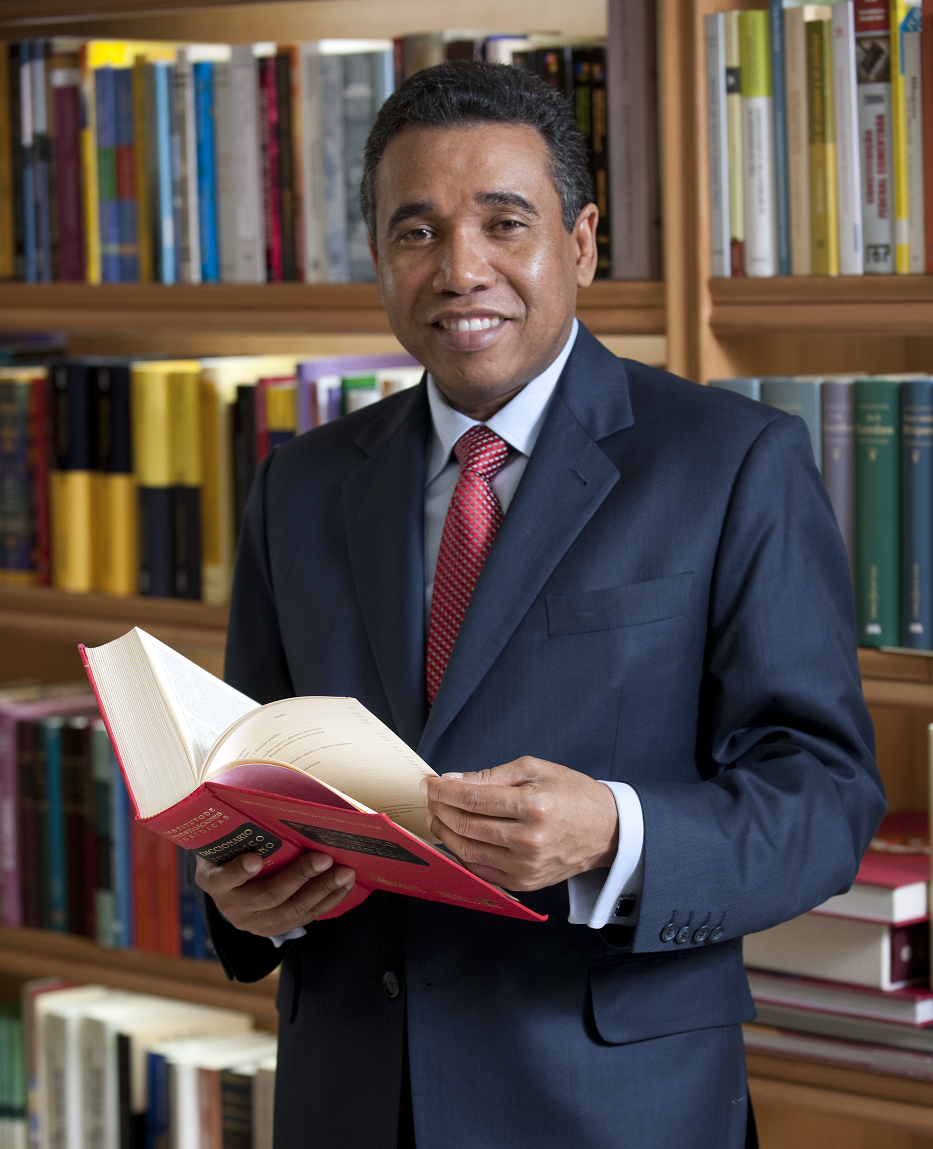
- Official portrait of Senator Bautista

Senator of the Dominican Republic
- Incumbent
- Assumed office 16 August 2010
- Preceded by: Jose Ramón de la Rosa Mateo

Director of the Office of Supervising Engineers of State Works
- In office August 2004 – 16 August 2010
- Preceded by: Hernani Salazar
- Succeeded by: Luis Wilfredo Sifres Nunez

Personal details
- Born: 16 May 1963 (age 63) San Juan, Dominican Republic
- Party: Dominican Liberation’s Party
- Spouse: Sarah Rojas
- Children: 7 (2 with Sarah Rojas)
- Parent(s): Luis María Bautista & Jacoba Figuereo
- Education: Universidad Autónoma de Santo Domingo
- Occupation: Politician, Businessman
- Net worth: by year: 1996: RD$ 547,000 (US$ 39,000); 2016: ▲RD$30,605,222.64 (US$664,472.89); 2024: ▲RD$213,517,382.38 (US$3,584,956.85)
- Félix Bautista on X

Félix Ramón Bautista Rosario (born 16 June 1963) is a Dominican Republic member of the Senate of the Dominican Republic since 2010. In the period 1996-2000 he was appointed Deputy Director of the Office of Supervising Engineers of State, term in which his privately held companies executed the biggest contracts of the state. Six months later, he was appointed as Director of the Coordinating Office of State Works, a post he held until the month of August 2000. He was Director of the Office of Supervising Engineers of State with the rank of Secretary of State during the period August 2004-August 2010. He is also an active businessman in the construction industry, the principal owner of HADOM Construction and ROFI SA., companies who have been year by year executing bulky contracts mysteriously won in "public" tenders He was sworn in as Senator of the Dominican Republic by the Province of San Juan on 16 August 2010.

On June 12, 2018, Félix Bautista, and five companies owned or controlled by him were sanctioned by the U.S. Department of Treasury under the Global Magnitsky Act due to his involvement in significant corruption. Bautista has reportedly engaged in bribery in relation to his position as a Senator, and is alleged to have engaged in corruption in Haiti, where he used his connections to win public works contracts to help rebuild Haiti following several natural disasters, including one case where his company was paid over $10 million for work it had not completed.

Politically, Bautista is a member of the Dominican Liberation Party (PLD), since 1981, where he has held the positions of Secretary of Minutes and Matches, Middle Leader, Operational Director of Propaganda on the Campaigns of 1996, 2000, 2004, National Operations Director of the 2008 season, and currently is Member of the Central Committee, and Secretary of Organization of the Dominican Liberation Party, one of the most important positions within the political party. On 2018, he was removed as a member of the party after being involved in more corruption charges.

Bautista has been subject to charges of corruption including allegedly receiving two billion-pesos contracts from the same state construction work through two companies linked to him by the attorney general's office. His companies have been accused of poorly executing these contracts nevertheless of over-charging.

Bautista has repeatedly denounced the charges against only seek to interfere with the possible campaign of former President Leonel Fernandez who would run a new turn in 2016. In March–April 2012, Bautista was accused of corruption, with allegations that during and after the 2010 election he had given Haitian President Michel Martelly $2.6m in bribes to ensure that his company would continue to receive contracts under Martelly's presidency. Martelly and Bautista both denied the allegations. The Supreme Court of the Dominican Republic has set for 1 October 2014 the first hearing in the case. More recently, on 27 March, the Supreme Court issued a ruling that benefited Senator Bautista on these allegations. Indicating that the Public Prosecutor Francisco Dominguez Brito, violated the laws and constitution to produce evidence against Senator. It also indicated that valid evidence was insufficient for a trial of the accused in the case. Several writers, and even the Prime Minister of Haiti, have described and analyzed the accusations against Felix Bautista which they regard as political persecution.
