= Dominican franco =

Former currency of the Dominican Republic

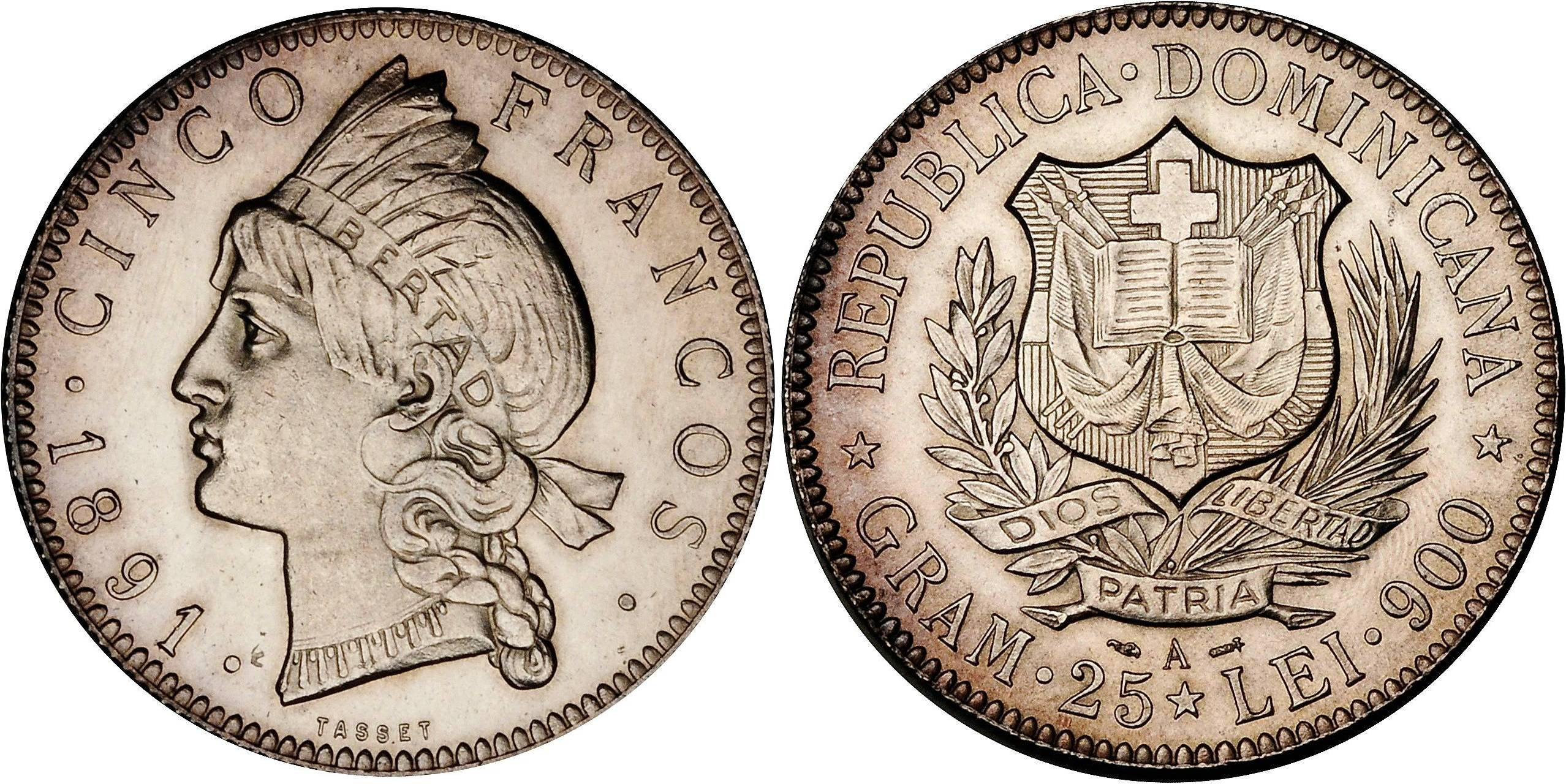
5 Franco coin

The franco was a currency introduced in the Dominican Republic in 1891, as the Dominican Republic Government, then headed by president Ulises Heureaux intended to join the Latin Monetary Union. It was worth five pesos and subdivided into 100 centésimos. Five denominations of coins were issued, 5, 10 and 50 centesimos, 1 and 5 francos. Although apparently intended to replace the mexican peso which was the main circulating currency back then, this did not happen, because the Dominican Government did not establish parity with the circulating Mexican peso and in 1897, new coins denominated in pesos and similar in design to the franco coins were introduced. The coins matched the specifications of the French 10 and 50 centimes and 1 and 5 francs, indicating that a link between the franco and the Latin Monetary Union was intended.

In 1891, 125,000 1-franco coins were produced.
