= Antonio Marte =

Dominican politician (born 1955)

Senator of Santiago Rodríguez Province
- Preceded by: Antonio Cruz

Personal details
- Born: Casimiro Antonio Marte Familia; March 4, 1955 (age 71)
- Party: People First Party

Casimiro Antonio Marte Familia (born March 4, 1955, in Toma, Santiago Rodríguez), also known as Antonio Marte, is a Dominican Republic businessman, trade unionist and senator. He is part of the People First Party. He has served as Senator of Santiago Rodríguez Province since 2020.

== Personal life ==
Antonio Marte was born on March 4, 1955, in Toma, Santiago Rodríguez Province, to Ramón Antonio Marte Fernández and Felipa Familia. He is married to Juana Fernández Rosario, with whom he has eight children, including actress Jatnna Marte.

== Political career ==
He started in politics when he moved to Santo Domingo in 1973, during the presidency of Joaquín Balaguer. There, he created his first union, called SITRAPURNO (Public Transport Union of the Northern Region). During this time, he had several run-ins with the police and arrests. He became acquainted with the expresident Antonio Gúzman, who encouraged him to join the Revolutionary Dominican Party (PRD). He founded CONATRA (National Confederation of Transport Organizations) in 1986.

In 2013, he launched his party Primero La Gente. This organization promoted a social-democratic ideology. He repeatedly applied for formal recognition of his party, but was denied. Although not officially recognized, the movement was able to elect 3 senators, 17 regidores, and a mayor in the 2016 elections through alliances with the Modern Revolutionary Party (PRM), the Dominican Liberation Party (PLD) and the Dominican Revolutionary Party (PRD). Antonio Marte ran for senator of Santiago Rodríguez Province with the PRM, but lost by a narrow margin to Antonio Cruz and the PLD.

In 2018, Antonio Marte returned to the PRD. In the 2020 elections, he obtained the support of the PRM, PRD, Fuerza del Pueblo and Social Christian Reformist Party (PRSC), with the PRSC being his main supporting party, and obtained 52.73% of the votes in Santiago Rodríguez.

As a senator, he successfully passed a law that designated Santiago Rodríguez as an ecotourism area. In 2021, he resigned from the Fuerza del Pueblo bloc, claiming that he had never officially been part of it despite it appearing on the ballot. According to a 2024 survey, he is expected to be reelected as Senator.

== Controversies ==
In 2008, he was found guilty of corruption during his decisions in the Transportation Renewal Plan. The Supreme Court of Justice gave him a sentence of three years in prison and a fine of eight million pesos for having been involved in the fraud of more of 1,800 million pesos together with several officials and transporters in the Government of former President Hipólito Mejía. However, president Leonel Fernández pardoned his sentence later that year. Some time later, the National Council of Private Enterprise and 80 other organizations sued Conatra for having an alleged monopoly over transportation.

After the General Directorate of Immigration detained several buses, Antonio Marte's transport syndicate prohibited its buses from carrying Haitian citizens "no matter if they are legal or illegal." After receiving criticism, the syndicate restored access to its buses for Haitian citizens. He has repeatedly opposed Haitian immigration and advocated for stronger border control in order to restrict the flow of Haitian nationals to the Dominican Republic. He opposed direct intervention after gang violence broke out in Port-au-Prince, stating that all aid should go through the UN.
