= Alexis Victoria Yeb =

Dominican politician (born 1972)

National Senator for the Province of María Trinidad Sánchez
- Incumbent
- Assumed office 16 August 2020
- Preceded by: Arístides Victoria Yeb

Personal details
- Born: 12 October 1972 Nagua, Dominican Republic
- Party: Modern Revolutionary Party
- Spouse(s): Maribel Gómez, Xiomara Ortiz (div.)
- Relations: Arístides Victoria José (uncle); Arístides Victoria Yeb (double cousin); Eladio Victoria (great-granduncle)
- Children: 3
- Parents: José Victoria José (father); Dulce Yeb Raposo (mother)

Alexis Victoria Yeb (born 12 October 1972) is a politician and businessman from the Dominican Republic.

== Early life and family ==
Victoria Yeb was born into the Victoria family, a political dynasty of the Dominican Republic of French origin. His parents are Dulce Yeb Raposo, of Lebanese and Portuguese ancestry, and José Victoria José, former congressman of the Dominican Republic of French and Lebanese descent. His parents are siblings of Lourdes Yeb Raposo and Arístides Victoria José (former congressman and ex Vice Minister of Labor of the Dominican Republic), respectively, the both of them parents of his predecessor Arístides Victoria Yeb, consequently, Alexis and Arístides are double cousins.

He was born on October 12, 1972, in the city of Nagua, María Trinidad Sánchez province. At the age of 17, he attended the Instituto Tecnológico de Santo Domingo, where he graduated with a degree in Business Administration.

In 2001, he married businesswoman Xiomara Ortiz. With Xiomara, he had a daughter: Alexia Marie. Later, he married Maribel Gómez, with whom he has two children: María Alejandra and Alexis Karim.

== Political career ==
In 2010, he joined the Dominican Revolutionary Party (PRD). He participated in the founding of the Partido Revolucionario Mayoritario, currently the Partido Revolucionario Moderno.

Victoria Yeb was elected Senator for the Province of María Trinidad Sánchez in 2020.
