= Omar Fernández (politician) =

Dominican politician (born 1991)

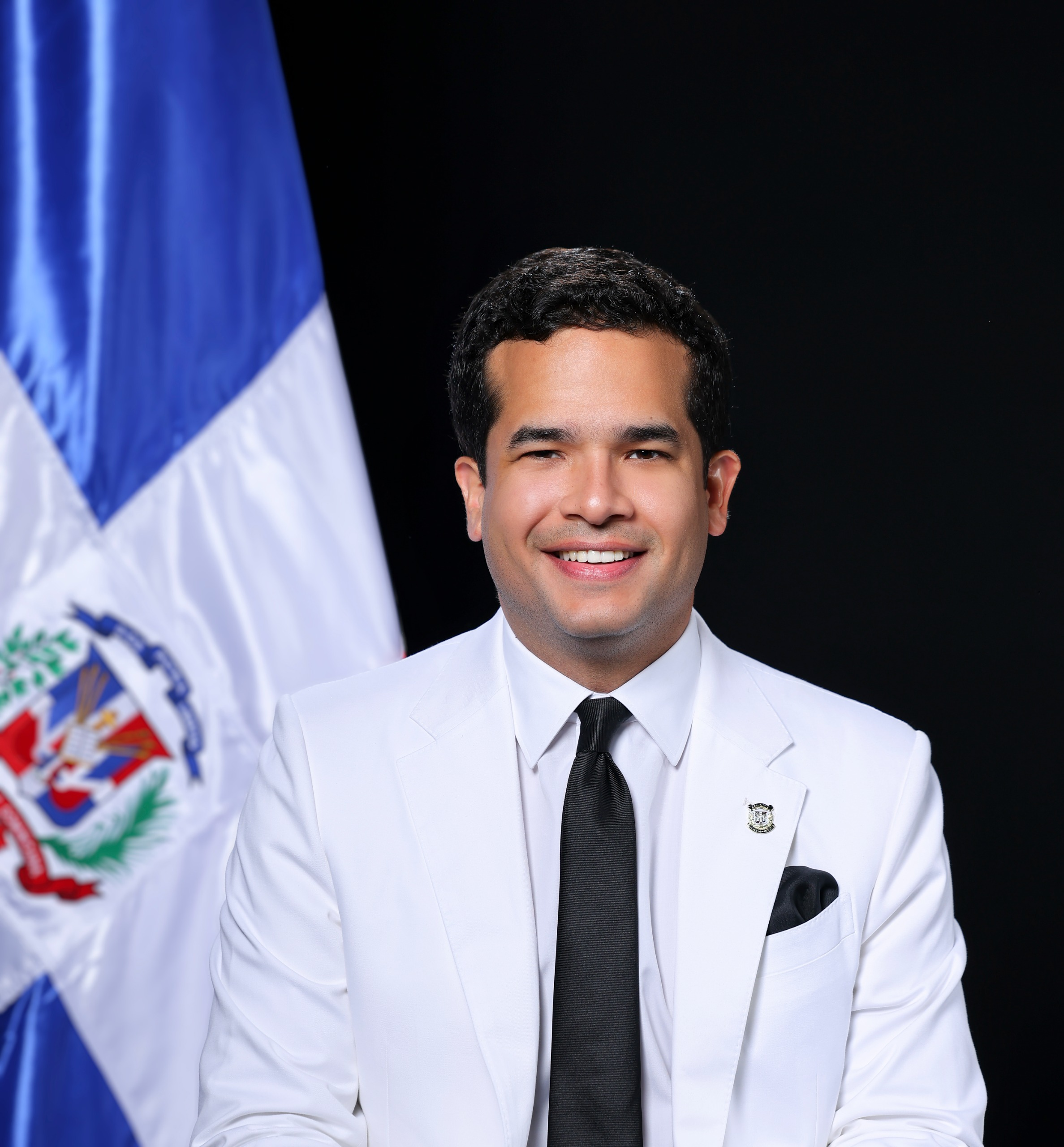
- Fernández in 2024

Senator for Distrito Nacional
- Incumbent
- Assumed office 16 August 2024
- Preceded by: Faride Raful
- Constituency: Distrito Nacional

Deputy for the 1st circunscription of Distrito Nacional
- In office 16 August 2020 – 16 August 2024

Personal details
- Born: Omar Leonel Fernández Domínguez; 5 December 1991 (age 34) Santo Domingo, Dominican Republic
- Party: People's Force (since 2019)
- Spouse: Alexia Rubio (m. 2026)
- Parents: Leonel Fernández (father); Rocío Domínguez Quezada (mother)

Omar Leonel Fernández Domínguez (born 5 December 1991) is a Dominican politician serving as a member of the Senate since 2024. From 2020 to 2024, he was a member of the Chamber of Deputies. He is the son of Leonel Fernández.
