= Heinz Vieluf =

The Most Excellent Heinz Vieluf

Senator for the province of Monte Cristi
- Incumbent
- Assumed office 16 August 2006
- Preceded by: Bernardo Alemán (PRD)

Personal details
- Born: 30 March 1959 (age 67) Santiago, Province of Santiago (Dominican Republic)
- Party: Dominican Liberation’s Party
- Children: 10
- Parent(s): Siegfried Vieluf, Ligia Cabrera
- Education: Bryant College (M.B.A.)
- Committees: President – "Committee of Dominicans Living Abroad"
- Heinz Vieluf on X

Heinz Siegfried Vieluf Cabrera (born 30 March 1959) is a businessman and politician from the Dominican Republic. He was Senator for the province of Monte Cristi, from 2006 to 2020.

Vieluf founded the Fundación Heinz Vieluf Cabrera foundation.
