= Eladio Victoria =

Dominican politician

Mr. President Eladio Victoria y Victoria
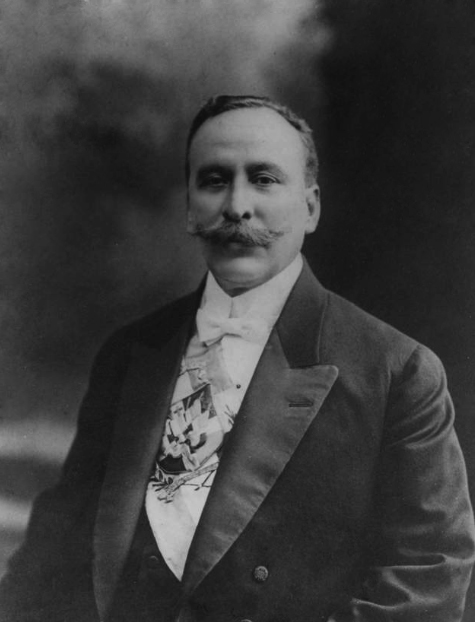

President of the Dominican Republic

Interim President of the Dominican Republic
- In office 5 December 1911 – 27 February 1912
- Preceded by: Council of Secretaries of State
- Succeeded by: Adolfo Alejandro Nouel

President of the Dominican Republic
- In office 27 February 1912 – 30 November 1912

Personal details
- Born: July 30, 1864 Baní, Dominican Republic
- Died: July 27, 1939 (aged 74) Santiago de los Caballeros, Dominican Republic
- Profession: Politician

Eladio Victoria y Victoria (July 30, 1864 in Baní – July 27, 1939 in Santiago de los Caballeros) was a Dominican Republic politician. He served as the 32nd president of the Dominican Republic from December 5, 1911, until November 30, 1912. Direct US intervention forced him to resign.

His entire presidency coincided with the Dominican Civil War of 1911–1912. He was succeeded in the presidency by his co-brother-in-law Monsignor Adolfo Alejandro Nouel.

Victoria was 3/4 French. He was great-granduncle of Arístides and Alexis Victoria Yeb.

Ancestors of Eladio Victoria

8. (=12) (France) Jean Victoriá Oben; *Bordeaux. †Baní, 1819
4. (Dominican Republic) Alexandre Victoria Oben
9. (=13) (France) Thérèse Oben
2. (Dominican Republic) Alejandro Victoria Lagrange
10. (France) Joseph Lagrange
5. (Curaçao) María Lagrange Valois
11. (France) Margherite Valois
1. Eladio Abdon “Quiquí” Victoria y Victoria
12. (=8) (France) Jean Victoriá Oben; *Bordeaux. †Baní, 1819
6. (Dominican Republic) Juan Bautista Victoria Oben; *Baní, 1801. †ibid. 1884
13. (=9) (France) Thérèse Oben
3. (Dominican Republic) María Josefa Victoria de Brea
14. (Dominican Republic) Manuel de Brea Tejeda
7. (Dominican Republic) María Eusebia de Brea Tejada
15. (Dominican Republic) María Merced Tejeda de Soto
