= Emilio Prud'Homme =

Dominican politician, author of the Dominican national anthem (1856–1932)

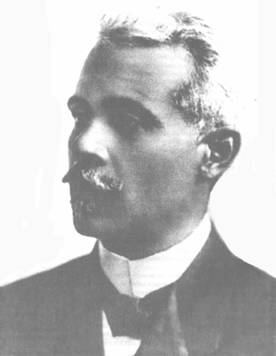

Legislator of the Dominican Republic
- In office 31 July 1916 – 29 November 1916

Secretary of Justice and Social Instruction
- In office 31 July 1916 – 29 November 1916

Personal details
- Born: July 21, 1856 San Felipe de Puerto Plata, Dominican Republic
- Died: August 21, 1932 (aged 76) Santo Domingo, Dominican Republic
- Occupation: Teacher, writer, activist
- Profession: Lawyer

Emilio Prud'Homme y Maduro (August 20, 1856 - July 21, 1932) was a Dominican lawyer, writer, and educator. Prud'Homme is known for having authored the lyrics of the Dominican national anthem. He is also attributed with helping establish a national identity, for what was at the time a nascent republic.

== Biography ==
Emilio Prud'Homme was born in Puerto Plata, Dominican Republic on August 20, 1856, to Ana Maduro and Gen. Pedro Prud'Homme. He had a brother, Lorenzo Fenelón Prud'Homme.

Prud'Homme excelled in teaching, an activity to which he devoted most of his life. He was a great collaborator and disciple of Eugenio María de Hostos and taught at "Perserevancia of Azua" and also in the "Liceo Dominicano" in 1892 and was director of the "Normal School", a teaching college founded by Hostos in 1880.

He married Manuela Batista on August 19, 1880, and had one daughter: Ana Emilia Prud'Homme.

== Politics ==
Prud'Homme was a legislator in the Congress of the Dominican Republic. He served as the President of Chamber of Deputies of the Dominican Republic in 1900 and 1901. He also served as the Secretary of Justice and Social Instruction in the administration of Francisco Henríquez y Carvajal. Prud’Homme was publicly critical of the United States occupation and as a result was forced to resign his teaching post. As a result, he pursued a career as a lawyer.

== Writing career ==
Most of his literary works were directed to the exaltation of patriotic values, respect and love for the defense of sovereignty and national independence.

His magnum opus being the Dominican National Anthem, which was written in 1883, with music by José Rufino Reyes y Siancas. He later modified his work in 1897, when it began to be used at official state functions. Yet, it was not officially the National Anthem until 1934, when then dictator Rafael Leónidas Trujillo consecrated it as a national symbol and made mandatory its use at state and public functions.

== Bibliography ==
- "El 16 de agosto" ("The 16th of August")
- "A la juventud dominicana" ("To the Dominican youth")
- "A mi Patria" ("To my homeland")
- "Déjame soñar" ("Let me dream")
- "Mi tierra mía" ("My land mine")
- "Himno Nacional Dominicano"
- "Gloria a la idea" ("Glory be to the idea")
- "Contra hibridismo" ("Against hybridism")
- "A Bolívar" ("To Bolívar")
- "Canto a América" ("Song of America")
