= Reinaldo Pared Pérez =

Dominican politician (1956–2021)

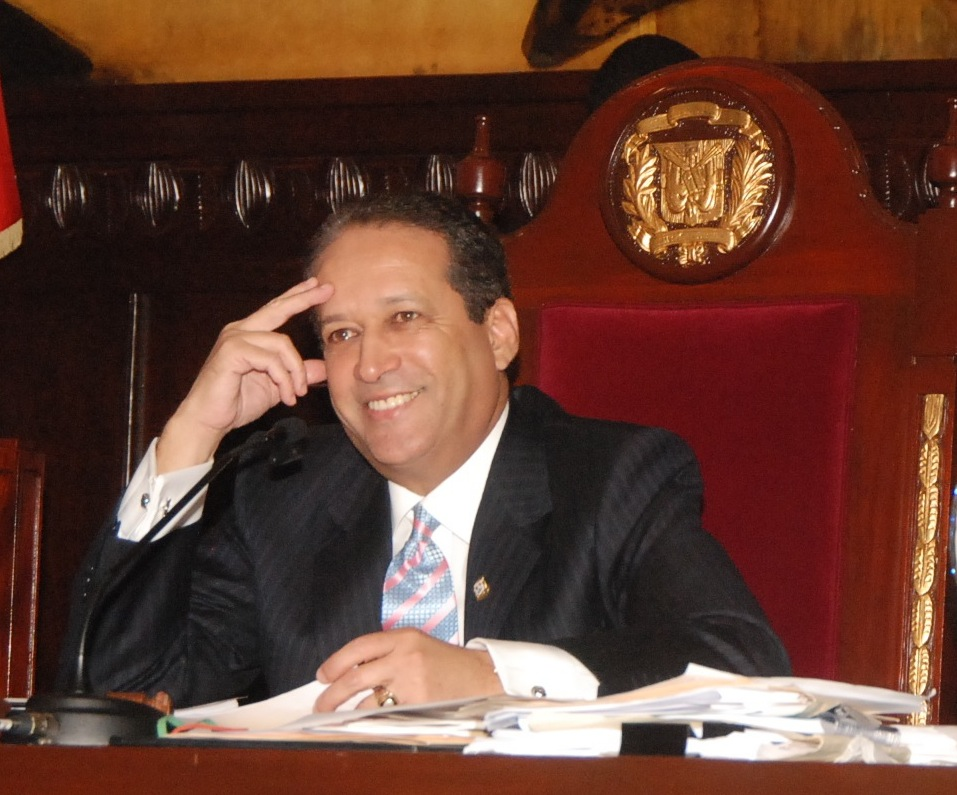
- Pared Pérez in 2009

President of the Senate of the Dominican Republic
- In office 16 August 2016 – 16 August 2020
- Preceded by: Cristina Lizardo
- Succeeded by: Eduardo Estrella
- In office 16 August 2006 – 16 August 2014
- Preceded by: Porfirio Andrés Bautista García
- Succeeded by: Cristina Lizardo

Member of the Senate
- In office 16 August 2006 – 16 August 2020
- Preceded by: José Tomás Pérez
- Constituency: Distrito Nacional

Member of the Chamber of Deputies
- In office 16 August 1998 – 16 August 2002
- Constituency: Distrito Nacional

General Secretary of the Dominican Liberation Party
- In office 2001 – 7 March 2021
- Succeeded by: Charlie Mariotti

Personal details
- Born: 25 September 1956 Santo Domingo, Dominican Republic
- Died: 29 October 2021 (aged 65) Juan Dolio, Dominican Republic
- Cause of death: Suicide by gunshot
- Party: Dominican Liberation Party

Reinaldo de las Mercedes Pared Pérez (25 September 1956 – 29 October 2021) was a Dominican politician. He represented Distrito Nacional in Chamber of Deputies from 1998 to 2002, and served in the Senate since 2006. Pared Pérez was president of the senate twice, between 2006 and 2014, and again between 2016 and 2020. A member of the Dominican Liberation Party, he was named general-secretary in 2001.

The government of the Republic of China (Taiwan) awarded Pared Pérez the Order of Brilliant Star Special Grand Cordon in June 2017.

The former secretary general of the Dominican Liberation Party, Reinaldo Pared Pérez, died this Thursday night in what appears to be a suicide.

Pérez had episodes of depression as a result of health problems caused by a cancer that was detected two years ago and for which he was undergoing treatment.

Pérez died by a suspected suicide on 29 October 2021, at the age of 65 in a summer residence in Juan Dolio, where he spent most of his time after the illness.
