= Senate of the Dominican Republic =

Upper house in the legislature of the Dominican Republic

Senate of the Dominican Republic Senado de la República Dominicana (Spanish)
- 2nd Ordinary Legislative Session of 2026
- Coat of arms of the Dominican Republic

Type
- Type: Upper house of the Congress of the Dominican Republic

History
- Established: November 6, 1844; 182 years ago
- New session started: 16 August 2026

Leadership
- President: Ricardo De Los Santos Polanco (PRM) since 16 August 2023
- Vice President: Julito Fulcar Encarnación (PRM) since 16 August 2026
- Secretaries: Andrés Guillermo Lama Pérez & Aracelis Villanueva Figueroa (PRM) since 16 August 2026
- Majority Leader: María Mercedes Ortiz Diloné (PRM) since 16 August 2026
- Minority Leader: Eduard Alexis Espiritusanto Castillo (FP) since 16 August 2025

Structure
- Seats: 32
- Political groups: Government (29) (PRM and allies): PRM (26); PRSC (1); PPG (1); Opposition (4): FP (3); Independent (1)
- Committees: 30
- Length of term: 4 years
- Salary: RD$320,000 (Note: The President of the Senate receives a monthly base salary of RD$400,000.) (monthly)

Elections
- Voting system: First past the post
- Last election: 19 May 2024
- Next election: 21 May 2028

Meeting place
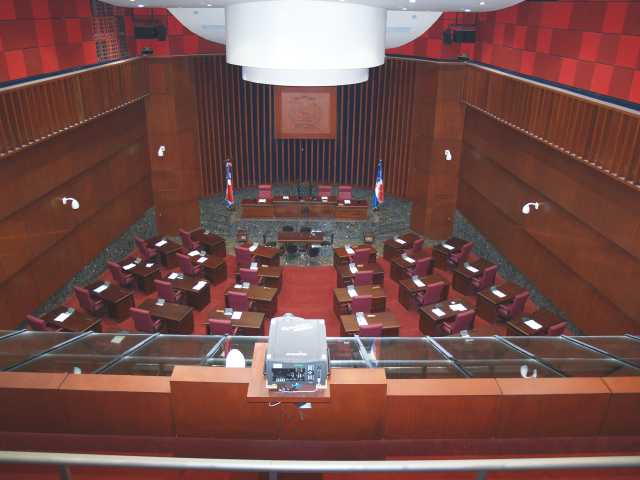
- Hemicycle of the Senate; Palace of the National Congress; Santo Domingo; Dominican Republic (2017)

Website
- www.senadord.gob.do (in Spanish)

Constitution
- Constitution of the Dominican Republic

Rules
- REGLAMENTO-DEL-SENADO-REP-DOM - Transparencia (in Spanish)

The Senate of the Dominican Republic (Spanish: Senado de la República Dominicana) is the upper house in the bicameral legislature of the Dominican Republic, and together with the Chamber of Deputies makes up the Congress.

The composition and powers of the Senate are established in Third Title, Chapter 1 in the First Section of the Dominican Constitution. Each province, and the Distrito Nacional, regardless of population, is represented by one senator who serves for a four-year term, with possibility of reelection. The Senate Chamber is located in the west wing of the Congress Palace, in Santo Domingo. The Chamber of Deputies convenes in the east wing of the same building.

The Senate has several advice and consent powers not granted to the Chamber of Deputies, including consenting to treaties, loans and contracts as a precondition to their ratification and consenting to or confirming appointments the members of Chamber of Accounts, Central Electoral Board and ambassadors. The Senate is widely considered both a more deliberative and more prestigious body than the Chamber of Deputies. Due to its smaller size and statewide constituencies, the Senate has historically had a more collegial and less partisan atmosphere.

== Membership ==
=== Qualifications ===
The constitution of the Dominican Republic states that to be a senator, one must be a Dominican in full exercise of civil and political rights, have attained twenty-five years old, and be a native of the territorial demarcation that choose or have resided there for at least five consecutive years. In consequence:

- The senators must reside in the territorial demarcation from which they are elected during their elected terms of office;
- Naturalized persons may be elected to the Senate ten years after having acquired Dominican nationality, provided they have resided in the territorial demarcation (jurisdiction) from which they seek election for a period of at least five years prior to their election.

=== Election and Terms ===
The members of the Senate in Dominican Republic are elected by the D'Hondt method in relationship with the deputies. The terms for serving as senator are unlimited, one term corresponds to four years.

=== Oath ===
The internal rules of procedure of the Senate requires that senators take an oath or affirmation to support the Constitution. Congress has prescribed the following oath for all senators:

The oath to be provided is:

"I SWEAR TO GOD, THE HOMELAND AND MY HONOR, RESPECT CONSTITUTION AND LAWS AND COMPLY WITH DIGNITY AND THE FAITHFULLY OTHER DUTIES OF MY OFFICE",

what will be answered as follows:

"IF I DO SO, GOD AND THE PEOPLE WHAT OS REWARD IF I NOT, THAT I DEMAND IT. "

== Majority and minority parties ==
The "Majority party" is the political party that either has a majority of seats or can form a coalition or caucus with a majority of seats; if two or more parties are tied, the vice president's affiliation determines which party is the majority party. The next-largest party is known as the minority party.

=== Seating ===
The majority party or the party with more senators traditionally sits to the presiding officer's right, and the minority party or the party with less senator traditionally sits to the presiding officer's left, regardless which party has a majority of seats.

== Functions and Powers ==
The exclusive powers of the Senate are:

1. Know the allegations made by the Chamber of Deputies against and public officials. The plea leaves the person removed from office, and may not perform any public function, whether or not popularly elected for a term of ten years. The destitute person shall be subject, if any, to be charged and tried by the ordinary courts, in accordance with the law. This decision shall be taken by a vote of two-thirds of enrollment;
2. To approve or disapprove the appointment of ambassadors and heads of permanent missions accredited abroad to submit to the President of the Republic;
3. To elect the members of the Chamber of Accounts of the lists presented by the Chamber of Deputies, with the vote of two thirds of the senators present;
4. To elect the members of the Central Electoral Board and their deputies, with the vote of two thirds of those present;
5. Choose the Ombudsman, their deputies and their deputies from the triads to submit to the House of Representatives, by a vote of two-thirds of those present;
6. To authorize, upon request of the President of the Republic, in the absence of agreement permitted, the presence of foreign troops in military exercises in the territory of the Republic, as well as determine the time and conditions of their stay;
7. To approve or disapprove of sending troops abroad in peacekeeping missions authorized by international organizations, setting the conditions and duration of the mission.

== Current composition (2024–2028) ==
Senators elected in the May 19, 2024 elections.

==== Ruling party / Pro-government camp ====
- PRM bloc
  - Modern Revolutionary Party (26)
- PRSC bloc
  - Social Christian Reformist Party (1)
  - People First Party (1)

==== Opposition ====
- FP bloc
  - People's Force (3)
- Independent bloc
  - Independent (1)

Senator	Party	Electoral list	Bloc	Province
Lía Ynocencia Díaz Santana	PRM	PRM	PRM	Azua
Andrés Guillermo Lama Pérez	PRM	APD	PRM	Bahoruco
Moisés Ayala Pérez	PRM	PRI	PRM	Barahona
Manuel María Rodríguez Ortega	PRM	PRM	PRM	Dajabón
Omar Leonel Fernández Domínguez	FP	FP	FP	Distrito Nacional
Franklin Martín Romero Morillo	PRM	PRM	PRM	Duarte
Santiago José Zorrilla	PRM	PRM	PRM	El Seibo
Jonhson Encarnación Díaz	PRM	PRM	PRM	Elías Piña
Carlos Manuel Gómez Ureña	PRM	PRM	PRM	Espaillat
Cristóbal Venerado Castillo	PRM	PRM	PRM	Hato Mayor
María Mercedes Ortiz Diloné	PRM	PRM	PRM	Hermanas Mirabal
Dagoberto Rodríguez Adames	PRM	PRM	PRM	Independencia
Rafael Barón Duluc Rijo	PRM	PLR	PRM	La Altagracia
Eduard Alexis Espiritusanto Castillo	FP	FP	FP	La Romana
Ramón Rogelio Genao Durán	PRSC	PRSC	PRSC	La Vega
Alexis Victoria Yeb	PRM	PRM	PRM	María Trinidad Sánchez
Héctor Elpidio Acosta Restituyo	PRM	PRM	PRM	Monseñor Nouel
Bernardo Alemán Rodríguez	PRM	PRM	PRM	Monte Cristi
Pedro Antonio Tineo Núñez	PRM	PRM	PRM	Monte Plata
Secundino Velázquez Pimentel	PRM	PRM	PRM	Pedernales
Jultio Fulcar Encarnacion	PRM	PRM	PRM	Peravia
Ginette Bournigal Socías de Jiménez	PRM	PRM	PRM	Puerto Plata
Pedro Catrain Bonilla	PRM	PRM	PRM	Samaná
Gustavo Lara Salazar	PRM	PRM	PRM	San Cristóbal
Milciades Aneudy Ortiz Sajiun	PRM	PRM	PRM	San José de Ocoa
Félix Ramón Bautista Rosario	FP	FP	FP	San Juan
Aracelis Villanueva Figueroa	PRM	PRM	PRM	San Pedro de Macorís
Ricardo De Los Santos Polanco	PRM	PRM	PRM	Sánchez Ramírez
Daniel Enrique De Jesús Rivera Reyes	PRM	PRM	PRM	Santiago
Casimiro Antonio Marte Familia	PPG	PPG	PRSC	Santiago Rodríguez
Antonio Manuel Taveras Guzmán	Independent	PRM	Independent	Santo Domingo
Odalís Rafael Rodríguez Rodríguez	PRM	PRM	PRM	Valverde

== Composition (2020-2024) ==
Senators elected in the July 2020 elections. This list contains the changes that occurred after the election until 1 May 2021.

Senator	Electoral List	Party	Province
LIA YNOCENCIA; DÍAZ SANTANA	PRM	PRM	Azua
MELANIA; SALVADOR JIMÉNEZ	PRM	PRM	Bahoruco
JOSÉ MANUEL; DEL CASTILLO SAVIÑÓN	PLD	PLD	Barahona
DAVID RAFAEL; SOSA CERDA	PRSC	FP	Dajabón
FRANKLIN MARTÍN; ROMERO MORILLO	PRM	PRM	Duarte
SANTIAGO JOSÉ; ZORRILLA	PRM	PRM	El Seibo
ARYS YVAN; LORENZO SUERO	PLD	PLD	Elías Piña
CARLOS; GÓMEZ UREÑA	PRM	PRSC	Espaillat
CRISTÓBAL VENERADO ANTONIO; CASTILLO LIRIANO	PRM	PRM	Hato Mayor
BAUTISTA ANTONIO; ROJAS GÓMEZ	PRSC	FP	Hermanas Mirabal
VALENTÍN; MEDRANO PÉREZ	PLD	PLD	Independencia
VIRGILIO; CEDANO CEDANO	PRSC	FP	La Altagracia
IVÁN JOSÉ; SILVA FERNÁNDEZ	PRM	PRM	La Romana
RAMÓN ROGELIO; GENAO DURÁN	PRSC	PRSC	La Vega
ALEXIS; VICTORIA YEB	PRM	PRM	María Trinidad Sánchez
HÉCTOR ELPIDIO; ACOSTA RESTITUYO	PRM	PRM	Monseñor Nouel
RAMÓN ANTONIO; PIMENTEL GÓMEZ	PRM	PRM	Monte Cristi
LENÍN; VALDEZ LÓPEZ	PRM	PRM	Monte Plata
DIONIS ALFONSO; SÁNCHEZ CARRASCO	PLD	FP	Pedernales
MILCIADES MARINO; FRANJUL PIMENTEL	PRM	PRM	Peravia
GINNETTE ALTAGRACIA; BOURNIGAL SOCIAS DE JIMÉNEZ	PRM	PRM	Puerto Plata
PEDRO MANUEL; CATRAÍN BONILLA	PRM	PRM	Samaná
FRANKLIN ALBERTO; RODRÍGUEZ GARABITOS	FP	FP	San Cristóbal
JOSÉ ANTONIO; CASTILLO CASADO	BIS	FP	San José de Ocoa
FÉLIX RAMÓN; BAUTISTA ROSARIO	PLD	FP	San Juan
FRANKLIN YSAÍAS; PEÑA VILLANOVA	PLD	FP	San Pedro de Macorís
RICARDO; DE LOS SANTOS POLANCO	PRM	PRM	Sánchez Ramírez
RAFAEL EDUARDO; ESTRELLA VIRELLA	DXC	DXC	Santiago
CASIMIRO ANTONIO; MARTE FAMILIA	PRSC	FP	Santiago Rodríguez
ANTONIO MANUEL; TAVERAS GUZMÁN	PRM	PRM	Santo Domingo
MARTÍN EDILBERTO; NOLASCO VARGAS	PRM	PRM	Valverde
FARIDE VIRGINIA; RAFUL SORIANO	PRM	PRM	Distrito Nacional

== Composition (2016-2020) ==
Senators elected in the May 2016 elections.

Senator	Electoral List	Party	Province
RAFAEL PORFIRIO; CALDERÓN MARTÍNEZ	PLD	PLD	Azua
MANUEL ANTONIO; PAULA	PLD	PLD	Bahoruco
EDIS FERNANDO; MATEO VÁSQUEZ	PLD	PLD	Barahona
ROSA SONIA; MATEO ESPINOSA	PLD	PLD	Dajabón
AMÍLCAR JESÚS; ROMERO PORTUONDO	PLD	PLD	Duarte
SANTIAGO JOSÉ; ZORRILLA	PRM	PRM	El Seibo
ADRIANO DE JESÚS; SÁNCHEZ ROA	PLD	PLD	Elías Piña
JOSÉ RAFAEL; VARGAS PANTALEÓN	PLD	PLD	Espaillat
RUBÉN DARÍO; CRUZ UBIERA	PLD	PLD	Hato Mayor
LUIS RENÉ; CANAÁN ROJAS	PLD	PLD	Hermanas Mirabal
JUAN ORLANDO; MERCEDES SENA	PLD	PLD	Independencia
AMABLE; ARISTY CASTRO	PLD	PLR	La Altagracia
AMARILIS SANTANA; CEDANO DE MARTÍNEZ	PLD	PLD	La Romana
EUCLIDES RAFAEL; SÁNCHEZ TAVÁREZ	PLD	PLD	La Vega
ARÍSTIDES; VICTORIA YEB	PLD	PLD	Maria Trinidad Sanchez
FÉLIX MARÍA; NOVA PAULINO	PLD	PLD	Monseñor Nouel
HEINZ SIEGFRIED; VIELUF CABRERA	PLD	PLD	Monte Cristi
CHARLES NOEL; MARIOTTI TAPIA	PLD	PLD	Monte Plata
DIONIS ALFONSO; SÁNCHEZ CARRASCO	PLD	PLD	Pedernales
WILTON BIENVENIDO; GUERRERO DUMÉ	PLD	PLD	Peravia
JOSÉ IGNACIO RAMÓN; PALIZA NOUEL	PRM	PRM	Puerto Plata
PRIM PUJALS; NOLASCO	PLD	FP	Samaná
TOMMY ALBERTO; GALÁN GRULLÓN	PLD	PLD	San Cristóbal
PEDRO JOSÉ; ALEGRIA SOTO	BIS	PLD	San José de Ocoa
FÉLIX RAMÓN; BAUTISTA ROSARIO	PLD	PLD	San Juan
JOSÉ EMETERIO; HAZIM FRAPPIER	PRSC	PLD	San Pedro de Macorís
FÉLIX MARÍA; VÁSQUEZ ESPINAL	PLD	PRD	Sánchez Ramírez
JULIO CÉSAR; VALENTÍN JIMINIÁN	PLD	PLD	Santiago
ANTONIO DE JESÚS; CRUZ TORRES	PLD	PLD	Santiago Rodríguez
CRISTINA ALTAGRACIA; LIZARDO MÉZQUITA	PLD	PLD	Santo Domingo
MANUEL DE JESÚS; GÜÍCHARDO VARGAS	PLD	FP	Valverde
REINALDO DE LAS MERCEDES; PARED PÉREZ	PLD	PLD	Distrito Nacional

== Party strengths in the Senate ==
The following table shows the composition of the Senate at the start of the most recent legislative periods.

Party	1998	2002	2006	2010^{[1]}	2016	2020	2024
Modern Revolutionary Party (PRM)	–	–	–	–	2	17	24
Social Christian Reformist Party (PRSC)	3	2	3	4	1	6^{[2]}	1
Dominican Liberation Party (PLD)	3	1	22	28	26	6^{[3]}	0
Institutional Social Democratic Bloc (BIS)	0	0	0	0	1	1^{[4]}	0
People's Force (FP)	–	–	–	–	–	1^{[3]}	3
Dominicans for Change (DXC)	–	–	–	–	–	1	0
Dominican Revolutionary Party (PRD)	24	29	7	0	1	0	0
Liberal Reformist Party (PLR)	–	–	–	–	1	0	1
People First Party (PPC)	–	–	–	–	–	–	1
Alliance for Democracy (APD)	–	–	–	–	–	–	1
Independent Revolutionary Party (PRI)	–	–	–	–	–	–	1
Total	30	32^{[5]}	32	32	32	32	32

^{1} In 2010, the parliamentary term was extended to six years so that the elections could once again be held together with the presidential election. The presidential term had been shortened to two years in 1994, after the controversial election of Joaquín Balaguer against José Francisco Peña Gómez, after which the presidential and parliamentary elections were thus held separately, each every two years.
^{2} After the electoral roll, Senators Bautista Rojas (Hermanas Mirabal), David Sosa (Dajabón) and Virgilio Cedano (La Altagracia) transferred from the PRSC to the FP; Senator Antonio Marte (Santiago Rodríguez), although not transferred from the PRSC, is also counted as part of the FP; the PRSC thus holds now 2 seats only (Carlos Gómez, Espaillat, and Ramón Genao, La Vega).
^{3} After the elections, Senators Dionis Sánchez (Pedernales), Félix Bautista (San Juan) and Franklin Peña (San Pedro de Macorís) transferred from the PLD to the FP; the PLD thus now holds 3 seats only; the FP, also taking into account the transfers of PRSC and BIS and Antonio Marte (Santiago Rodríguez), now holds 9 seats.
^{4} After the transfer of Senator José Castillo (San José de Ocoa) from the BIS to the FP, the BIS now holds no seat anymore.
^{5} In 2001 and 2002 respectively, the provinces of Santo Domingo (by secession from the Distrito Nacional) and San José de Ocoa (by secession from the province of Peravia) were created, bringing the number of senators to 32.

== See also ==
- Politics of the Dominican Republic
- List of political parties in the Dominican Republic
- List of presidents of the Senate of the Dominican Republic
