= José Rufino Reyes y Siancas =

Dominican composer of the national anthem (1836–1905)

José Rufino Reyes
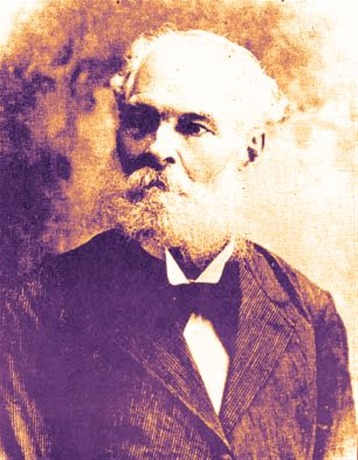
- Photo of Jose Rufino Reyes y Siancas
- Born: José Rufino Reyes y Siancas; November 15, 1836; Santo Domingo, Republic of Haiti
- Died: January 31, 1905 (aged 68); Santo Domingo, Dominican Republic
- Other name: Jose Reyes
- Occupations: Composer, musician

José Rufino Reyes y Siancas, also known as Jose Reyes (November 15, 1836 – January 31, 1905) was a Dominican composer, best known for composing the current Dominican national anthem. Among his other works are compositions of waltzes and marches. He also composed secular and religious music.

== Biography ==
José Rufino Reyes y Siancas was born in Santo Dominigo, Dominican Republic, on November 15, 1836. He was the son of Rafael Reyes, a poor retailer, and María Merced Siancas. Reyes had two siblings, Manuel María Reyes Siancas (born 1821), and Francisco Reyes Siancas. Reyes had no formal education and was raised in cottage dwelling. Reyes served as a military soldier, where he first studied music, with the director of the military band, Juan Bautista Alfonseca. He learned various musical instruments, with primary focus on the cello.

== National anthem ==
In 1882, alongside Emilio Prud'Homme, he composed the music for what would later become the national anthem of the Dominican Republic. The following year on August 7, he premiered the composition in celebration of the twentieth anniversary of the restoration of the Republic with lyrics written by Prud'Homme, during a ceremony held at the Lodge La Esperanza. The composition was then again performed on February 27, 1884, in honor of Juan Pablo Duarte in the theater of the Republic during the occasion of the arrival of Duarte's remains in the country, which were deposited in the Chapel of the Immortals.Today his face is on the 2,000 Dominican peso bill next to Emilio Prud'Homme

In 1885, the composition received its greatest public praise when it was performed by the military band teacher Betances, in the Cathedral Square and its popularity then increased on the fiftieth anniversary of the Republic. In 1896 it was nominated to be the official anthem of the country unsuccessfully. On 7 June 1897, the Congress of the Dominican Republic passed an act adopting "Himno Nacional" with the original music and revised lyrics as the country's official national anthem; however, then-President Ulises Heureaux (1846–1899) vetoed the act because the lyric's author, Prud'homme, was an opponent of the president and his administration.

== Death ==
José Rufino Reyes died on January 31, 1905, without seeing the national anthem being formalized. His remains were laid to rest by the words of Federico Henriquez y Carvajal. In 1916, the Congress tried once again without results to formalize the anthem. Eventually on May 3, 1934, due to a message sent to Congress by the dictator Rafael Leonidas Trujillo, a law was passed which established Reyes' composition as the official anthem of the Dominican Republic.
