= Tony Raful =

Dominican poet (born 1951)

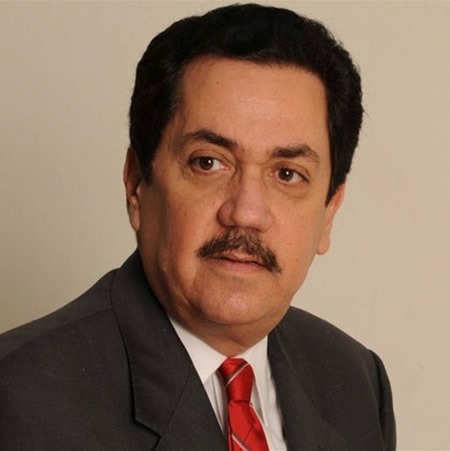
- Born: Tony Raful Tejada; April 28, 1951 (age 75); Santo Domingo, Dominican Republic
- Education: Universidad Autónoma de Santo Domingo
- Occupation: Poet

Tony Raful Tejada (born April 28, 1951) is a Dominican poet. He won the Dominican Republic's National Literature Prize in 2014.
