= National anthem of the Dominican Republic =

National anthem of the Caribbean state

Himno Nacional de la República Dominicana
English: National Anthem of the Dominican Republic
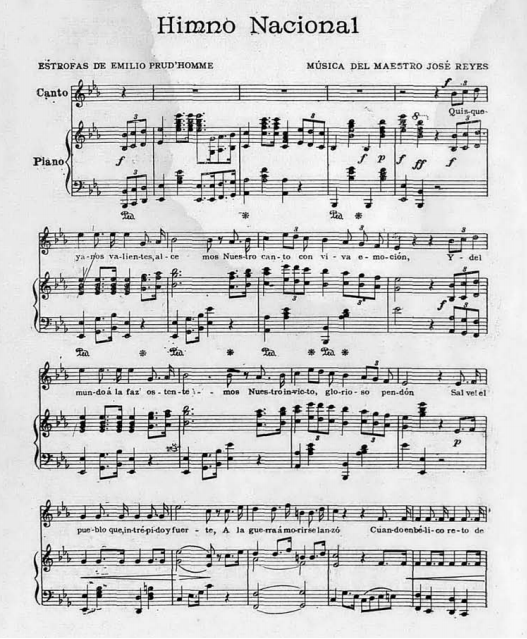
- National anthem of the Dominican Republic
- Also known as: Quisqueyanos valientes (English: Valiant Quisqueyans)
- Lyrics: Emilio Prud’Homme, 1882
- Music: José Rufino Reyes y Siancas, 1882
- Adopted: 30 May 1934

Audio sample
- U.S. Navy Band instrumental version (one verse): file; help

The national anthem of the Dominican Republic (Spanish: Himno Nacional de la República Dominicana), also known by its incipit Valiant Quisqueyans (Spanish: Quisqueyanos valientes), was composed by José Rufino Reyes y Siancas (1835–1905), and its lyrics were authored by Emilio Prud'Homme (1856–1932).

== History ==
José Reyes was inspired to create a national anthem for the Dominican Republic after having seen the Argentine National Anthem in the Parisian newspaper El Americano. In 1883, he invited his friend Emilio Prud'Homme to write lyrics for the anthem.

The first version of Prud'Homme's lyrics was published in the weekly newspaper El Eco de la Opinion on 16 August 1883, and the first public performance of the anthem took place the next day on 17 August in Respectable Hope Lodge No. 9 in Santo Domingo. Though the music was an instant success, several objections were made to the lyrics for having various historical inaccuracies. In 1897, Prud’Homme submitted revised lyrics, which stand to this day.

On 7 June 1897, the Congress of the Dominican Republic passed an act adopting "Himno Nacional" with the original music and revised lyrics as the country's official national anthem; however, then-President Ulises Heureaux (1846–1898) vetoed the act, because the lyric's author, Prud’Homme, was an opponent of the president and his administration. In 1899, Heureaux was assassinated, and the political disorder that ensued prevented the national anthem's legal adoption until 30 May 1934, when "Himno Nacional" was officially adopted and signed into law.

== Lyric ==
The Spanish name of the Dominican Republic, "República Dominicana", is never used in the anthem's official Spanish lyrics, nor is the demonym for Dominicans, "dominicanos". Rather, the indigenous word for the island of Hispaniola, "Quisqueya", is used twice, and its derivative demonym, "quisqueyanos", is used once. However, research later showed that these words do not seem to derive from the original Arawak Taíno language.

In public, the national anthem is usually performed through the end of the lyric's fourth paragraph.

Spanish original

I
Quisqueyanos valientes, alcemos
Nuestro canto con viva emoción,
Y del mundo a la faz ostentemos
Nuestro invicto glorioso pendón.

¡Salve! el pueblo que, intrépido y fuerte,
A la guerra a morir se lanzó,
Cuando en bélico reto de muerte
Sus cadenas de esclavo rompió.

Ningún pueblo ser libre merece
Si es esclavo indolente y servil;
Si en su pecho la llama no crece
Que templó el heroísmo viril,

Mas Quisqueya la indómita y brava
Siempre altiva la frente alzará;
Que si fuere mil veces esclava
Otras tantas ser libre sabrá.

II
Que si dolo y ardid la expusieron
De un intruso señor al desdén,
¡Las Carreras! ¡Beler!, campos fueron
Que cubiertos de gloria se ven.

Que en la cima de heróico baluarte
De los libres el verbo encarnó,
Donde el genio de Sánchez y Duarte
A ser libre o morir enseñó.

Y si pudo inconsulto caudillo
De esas glorias el brillo empañar,
De la guerra se vio en Capotillo
La bandera de fuego ondear.

Y el incendio que atónito deja
De Castilla el soberbio león,
De las playas gloriosas le aleja
Donde flota el cruzado pendón.

III
Compatriotas, mostremos erguida
Nuestra frente, orgullosos de hoy más;
Que Quisqueya será destruida
Pero sierva de nuevo, ¡jamás!

Que es santuario de amor cada pecho
Do la patria se siente vivir;
Y es su escudo invencible el derecho;
Y es su lema ser libre o morir.

¡Libertad! que aún se yergue serena
La Victoria en su carro triunfal,
Y el clarín de la guerra aún resuena
Pregonando su gloria inmortal.

¡Libertad! Que los ecos se agiten
Mientras llenos de noble ansiedad
Nuestros campos de gloria repiten
¡Libertad! ¡Libertad! ¡Libertad!

English translation

I
Brave Quisqueyans, let us raise
Our song with vivid emotion,
And let’s show to the face of the Earth
Our unconquered, glorious banner.

Hail, the people who strong and intrepid,
Into war launched itself set to die
When in a warring challenge to the death
Its chains of slavery cut off.

No people deserves to be free
If it’s an indolent and servile slave;
If in its chest doesn't grow the flame
that forged the virile heroism.

But Quisqueya the brave and indomitable
Always proudly her forehead will raise
For if she were a thousand times a slave
This many times will she be free.

II
And if fraud and cunning exposed her
To disdain of an intrusive man,
Las Carreras! Beler!...were fields
Which covered in glory were seen.

At the top of heroic bastion,
Word of the free was materialized,
Where the genius of Sanchez and Duarte
Taught to be free or to die.

And if an inconsiderate ruler
Could tarnish the glow of such glories,
The war banner of fire was seen
Waving over Capotillo.

And the fire that leaves stunned
The arrogant lion from Castile,
Pulls it away from the glorious beaches
Where the crossed banner floats.

III
Compatriots, let’s hold our
Forehead high, like never before;
For Quisqueya will be destroyed
But it will never again be enslaved.

That every chest is a shrine of love
Where one feels the homeland alive;
It is the law her invincible shield;
It is her motto be free or die.

Liberty that serenely stands up
Victory in her triumphal carriage.
The trumpet of war still resounds
Proclaiming her immortal glory

Freedom! Let the echoes agitate
While full of noble anxiety
Our battlefields of glory reverb these words -
Freedom! Freedom! Freedom!
