= NCDN =

Protein-coding gene in humans

Identifiers
- Aliases: NCDN, neurochondrin, NEDIES
- External IDs: OMIM: 608458; MGI: 1347351; GeneCards: NCDN

Gene location (Human)
Chr.	Chromosome 1 (human)
Band	1p34.3	Start	35,557,473 bp
Band	1p34.3	End	35,567,274 bp

Gene location (Mouse)
Chr.	Chromosome 4 (mouse)
Band	4|4 D2.2	Start	126,637,543 bp
Band	4|4 D2.2	End	126,647,231 bp
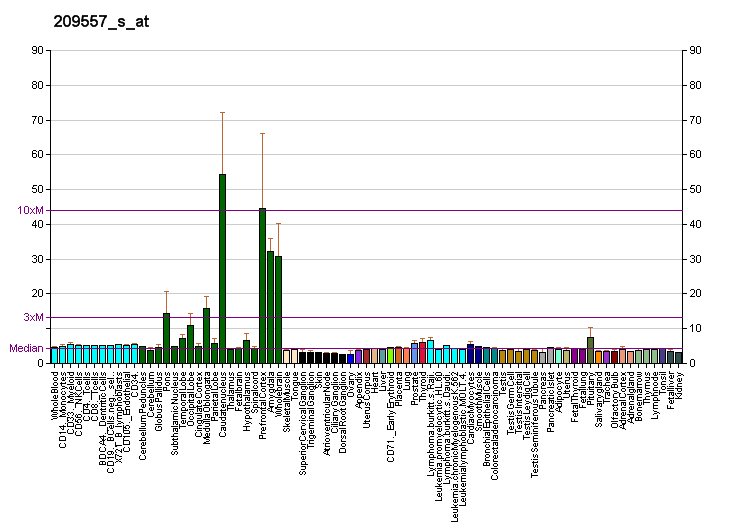

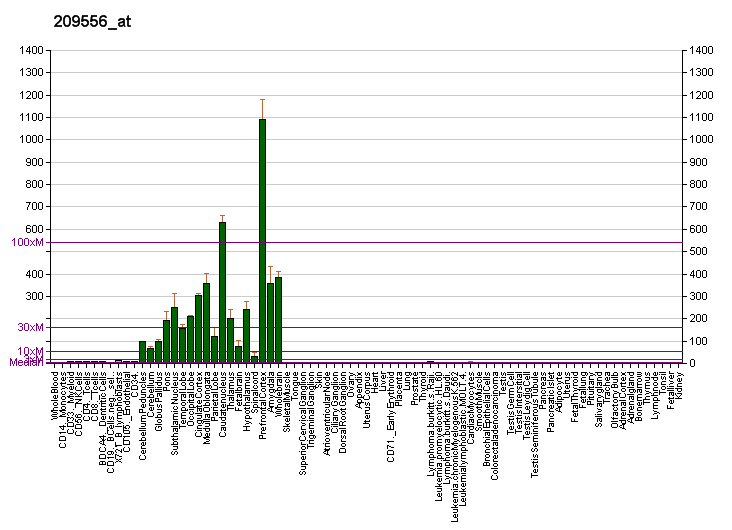
RNA expression pattern
Bgee	Human / Mouse (ortholog); Top expressed in: middle frontal gyrus; Brodmann area 10; nucleus accumbens; caudate nucleus; right frontal lobe; postcentral gyrus; putamen; right hemisphere of cerebellum; superior frontal gyrus; cingulate gyrus / Top expressed in: CA3 field; entorhinal cortex; perirhinal cortex; dentate gyrus; dentate gyrus of hippocampal formation granule cell; nucleus accumbens; nucleus of stria terminalis; lateral septal nucleus; primary visual cortex; hippocampus proper; More reference expression data
BioGPS	More reference expression data
Gene ontology
Molecular function	protein binding
Cellular component	cytoplasm; neuron projection; axon; soma; dendrite; cell projection; membrane; nucleus; cytosol
Biological process	regulation of neuronal synaptic plasticity; neuron projection development; bone resorption
Sources:Amigo / QuickGO
Orthologs
Databases	NCBI: entry; OMA: entry
Species	Human	Mouse
Entrez	23154	26562
Ensembl	ENSG00000020129	ENSMUSG00000028833
UniProt	Q9UBB6	Q9Z0E0
RefSeq (mRNA)	NM_014284; NM_001014839; NM_001014841	NM_011986; NM_001355412; NM_001355413
RefSeq (protein)	NP_001014839; NP_001014841; NP_055099	NP_036116; NP_001342341; NP_001342342
Location (UCSC)	Chr 1: 35.56 – 35.57 Mb	Chr 4: 126.64 – 126.65 Mb
PubMed search
- Wikidata
View/Edit Human	View/Edit Mouse

Neurochondrin (also known as its murine homologue, Norbin) is a protein that in humans is encoded by the NCDN gene.

This gene encodes a leucine-rich cytoplasmic protein, which is highly similar to a mouse protein norbin that negatively regulates Ca/calmodulin-dependent protein kinase II phosphorylation and may be essential for spatial learning processes. Several alternatively spliced transcript variants of this gene have been described.

Norbin can modulate signaling activity and expression of metabotropic glutamate receptor 5; modulating mice with targeted deletion of NCDN in the brain have phenotypic traits usually found in the rodent models of schizophrenia, including disruptions in prepulse inhibition. Furthermore, norbin protein expression is altered in the schizophrenia brain. Norbin also plays a role in regulating antimicrobial responses in neutrophils.

Neurochondrin proteins induce hydroxyapatite resorptive activity in bone marrow cells resistant to bafilomycin A1, an inhibitor of macrophage- and osteoclast-mediated resorption. Expression of the gene is localised to chondrocyte, osteoblast, and osteocyte in the bone and to the hippocampus and Purkinje cell layer of cerebellum in the brain.
