= Dominican peso =

Currency of the Dominican Republic

peso dominicano (Spanish)
- 2000 Dominican peso banknote

ISO 4217
- Code: DOP (numeric: 214)
- Subunit: 0.01

Units of account
- Symbol: $ (RD$)
- Nickname: cuarto, chele, peso oro
- Subunit
- 1/100: centavo

Denominations
- Banknotes
- Freq. used: 50, 100, 200, 500, 1000, 2000 pesos dominicanos
- Coins
- Freq. used: 1, 5, 10, 25 pesos dominicanos

Demographics
- User(s): Dominican Republic

Issuance
- Central bank: Central Bank of the Dominican Republic
- Website: www.bancentral.gov.do (in Spanish and English)
- Printer: Polish Security Printing Works
- Website: www.pwpw.pl (in Polish, Spanish, and English)

Valuation
- Inflation: 1.4%
- Source: The World Factbook, 2009 est.

The Dominican peso, officially the peso dominicano since 2010, is the currency of the Dominican Republic. Its symbol is "$", with the abbreviation "RD$" used when distinction from other pesos (or dollars) is required; its ISO 4217 code is "DOP". Each peso is divided into 100 centavos ("cents"), for which the ¢ symbol is used. With exception of the United States dollar, it is the only currency that is legal tender in the Dominican Republic for all monetary transactions, whether public or private.

Until the promulgation of the 2010 constitution, peso oro (English: Gold peso) was the official name of the currency of the Dominican Republic. Since then, Peso Dominicano is the official name of the monetary unit of the Dominican Republic, as specified in article 229 of the Constitution of the Dominican Republic.

== History ==
The first Dominican peso was introduced with the country's independence from Haiti in 1844. It replaced the Haitian gourde at par and was divided into 8 reales. The Dominican Republic decimalized in 1877, subdividing the peso into 100 centavos. A second currency, the franco, was issued between 1891 and 1897 but did not replace the peso. However, in 1905, the peso was replaced by the U.S. dollar, at a rate of 5 pesos to the dollar. The peso oro was introduced in 1937 at par with the U.S. dollar, although the dollar continued to be used alongside the peso oro until 1947.

== Coins ==
=== First peso, 1844–1905 ===
Only one denomination of coin was issued by the Dominican Republic before decimalization. This was the 1/4 real, issued in 1844 in bronze and in both 1844 and 1848 in brass. Decimalization in 1877 brought about the introduction of three new coins, the 1, 2 1/2 and 5 centavos. 1/4 centavo coins were also issued between 1882 and 1888. In 1891 Dominican Republic entered in the Latin Monetary Union and changed its currency to the franco including coins of 5 and 10 centesimos struck in bronze and 50 centesimos, 1 and 5 francos struck in silver. After the franco was abandoned, silver coins were introduced in 1897 in denominations of 10 and 20 centavos, 1/2 and 1 peso. The designs of these coins were very similar to those of the franco.

Older Coins

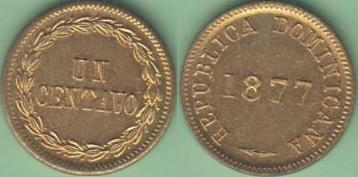
1877 One Centavo

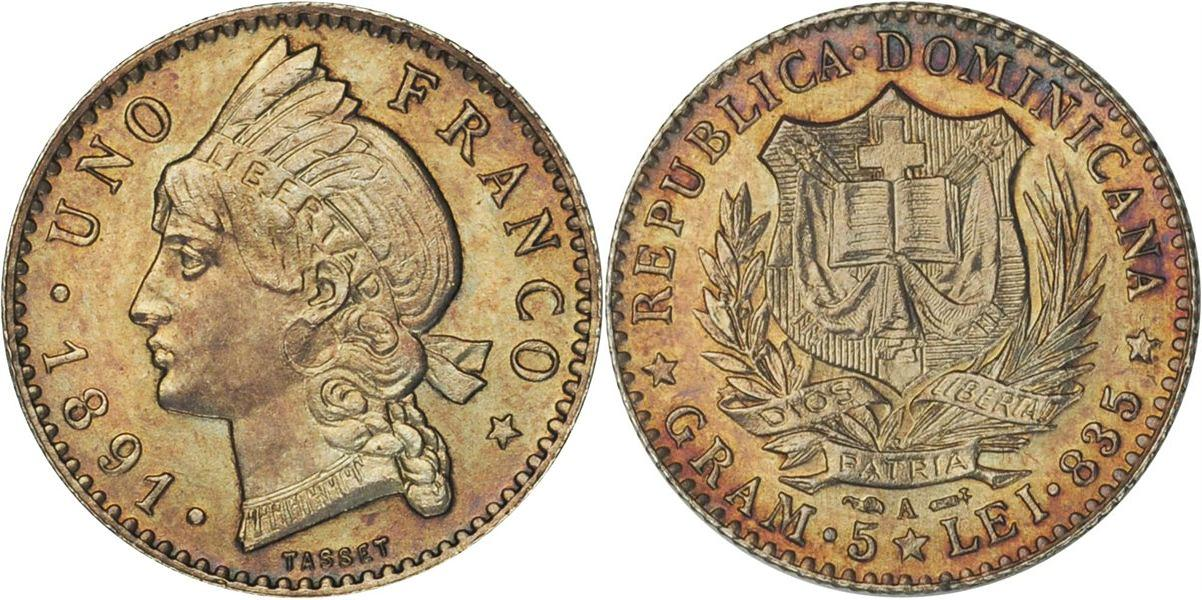
1891 One Franco

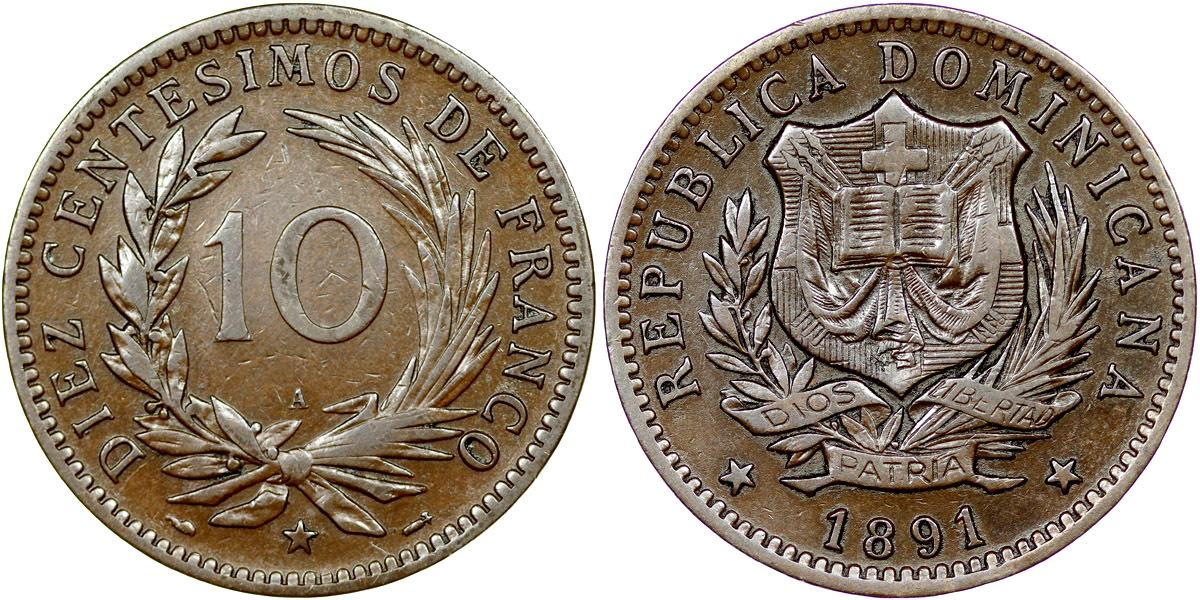
1891 Ten Centesimos

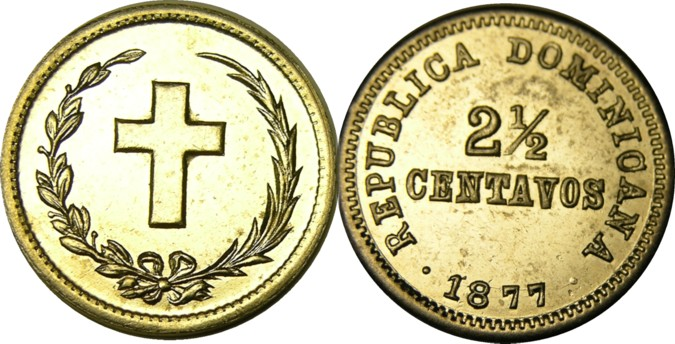
1877 2.5 Centavos

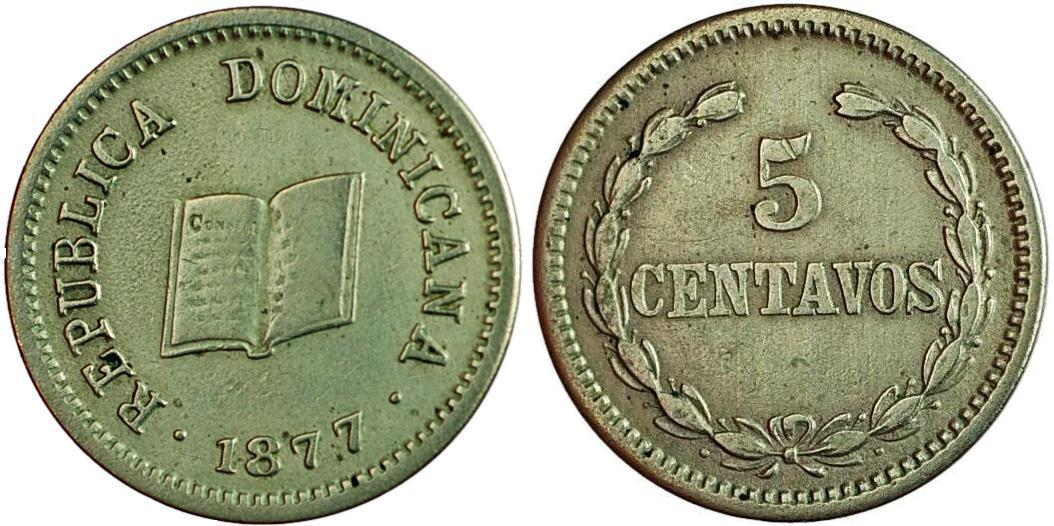
1877 Five Centavos

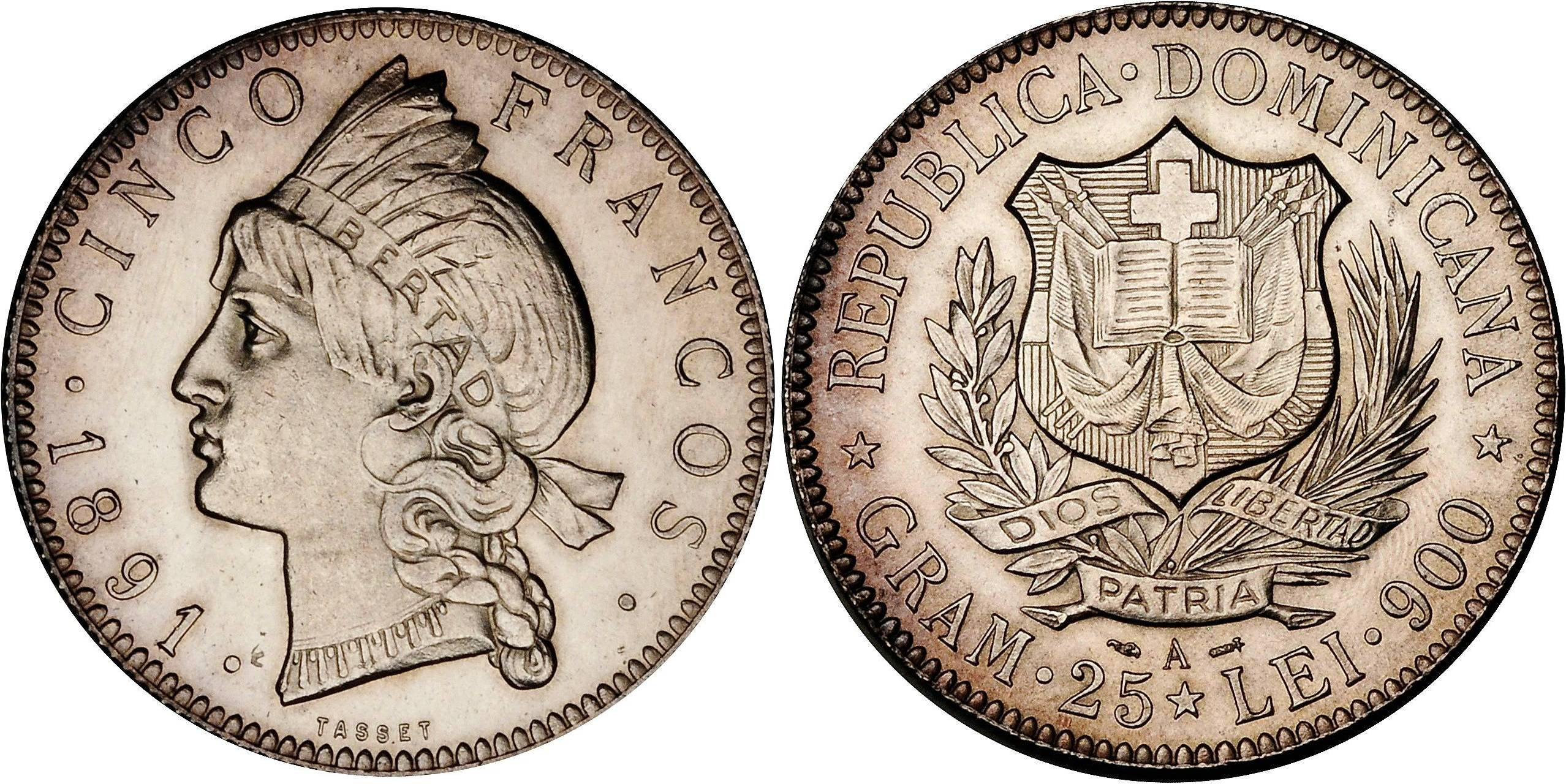
1891 25 Five Francos

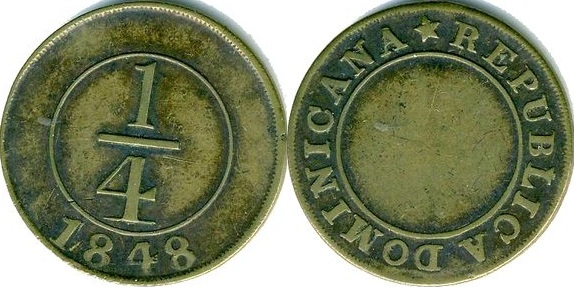
1848 Cuarto de Real

=== Peso Oro, from 1937 ===
Coins were introduced in 1937 in denominations of 1, 5, 10, 25 centavos and 1/2 pesos with limited numbers of 1 peso coins first minted in 1939. All coins bore the national arms on the reverse while all except the 1 centavo bore a crowned allegorical Indian head on the obverse. The 1 centavo instead depicted a palm tree, the symbol of the ruling Dominican Party. The coins were all of identical weights, diameter, and composition to U.S. coins of the era. Two denominations appeared on these coins, one in "centavos" or "pesos" and another in "gramos" to represent a pre-decimal silver weight system formerly used in much of the region. A two coin set of 1955 commemorative coins were minted for the 25th anniversary of Rafael Trujillo's reign. These consisted of a gold 30 peso (33,000 minted) and a silver one peso, both showing him in profile. 50,000 of the silver one peso coins were produced in issued into circulation, but after Trujillo was assassinated in 1961 an estimated 32,550 were recalled and melted down. In 1963 the silver content in the 10, 25, 50, and 1 peso coins was reduced from 0.900 pure to 0.650 pure. The 1963 issue also distinctively commemorated the centennial of the republic and the crowned Indian head was added to the 1 centavo, replacing the palm.

After 1963 the Peso Oro became a fiat currency and base metals replaced silver in the higher denominations, with the 10, and 25 centavos and 1/2 pesos reintroduced in copper-nickel in 1967. 1 peso coins were struck as only commemorative in small numbers. In 1976 a new coin series was introduced featuring Juan Pablo Duarte, and in 1983 another series was released featuring various other figures important to Dominican history, including the Mirabal sisters and formally dropping the outdated "gramos" denomination reference. In 1989, the content of the coins was changed from copper-nickel to nickel-plated steel. In 1991, eleven sided circulating non commemorative 1 peso coins were reintroduced in copper-zinc, followed by bimetal 5 pesos in 1997. For the latter coin the first year of issue was a circulating commemorative for the 50th anniversary of the national bank. Both a bimetal 10 pesos and a copper-nickel 25 pesos were introduced in 2005. Due to inflation, any coins below 1 peso are now rarely found.

RECENT COINS

- 1 Peso
- 5 Pesos
- 10 pesos
- 25 Pesos

== Banknotes ==
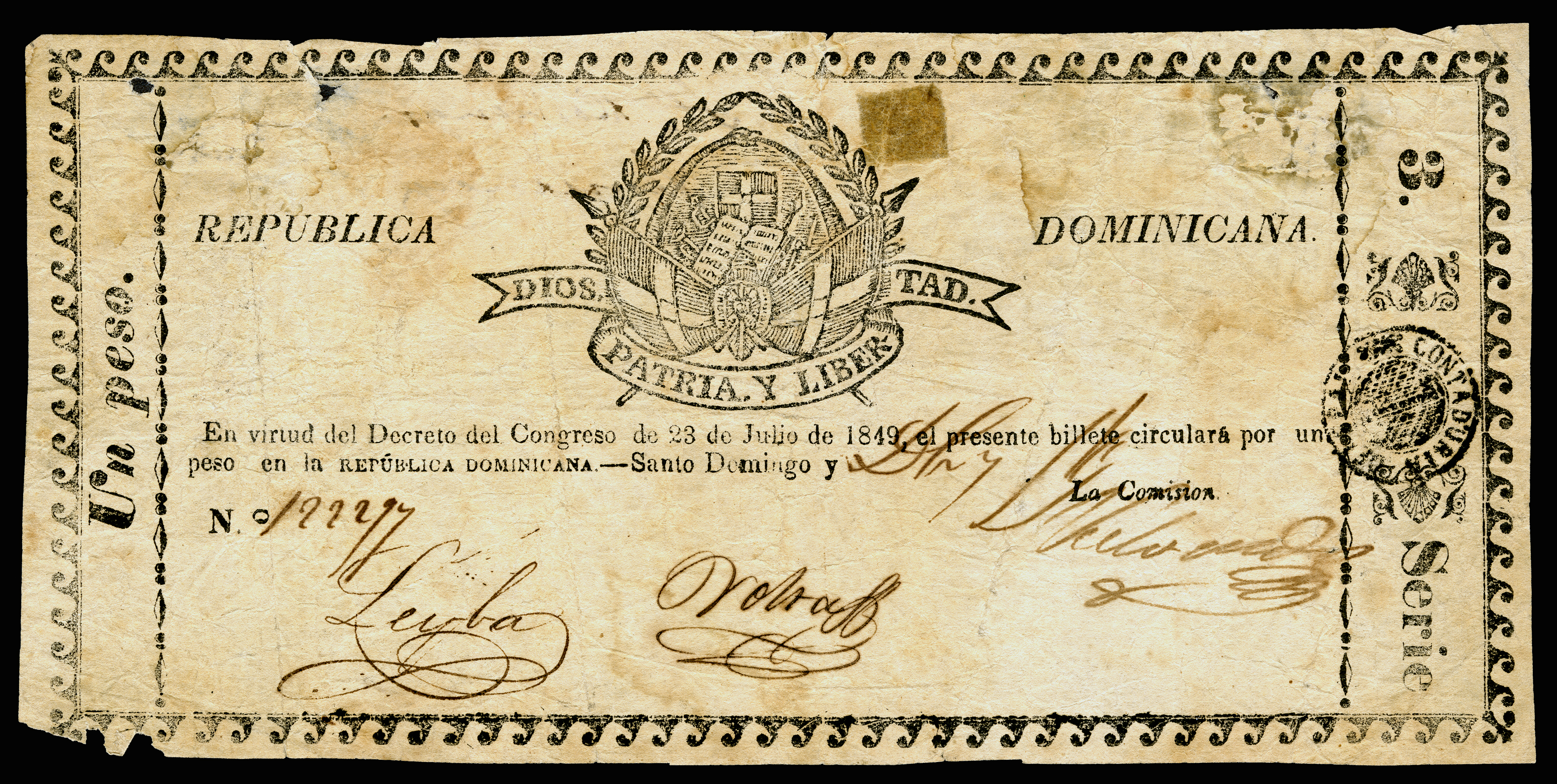
One peso bank note (1849) from the first regular government issue.

=== First peso, 1848–1905 ===
Paper money made up the bulk of circulating currency for the first peso. Provisional issues of 40 and 80 pesos were produced in 1848, followed by regular government notes for 1, 2 and 5 pesos in 1849, and 10 and 50 peso notes in 1858. The Comisión de Hacienda issued 50 and 200 pesos in 1865, whilst the Junta de Crédito introduced notes for 10 and 20 centavos that year, followed by 5 and 40 centavos in 1866 and 1, 2, 5 and 10 pesos in 1867. In 1862, the Spanish issued notes for 1/2, 2, 5, 15 and 25 pesos in the name of the Intendencia de Santo Domingo. The last government notes were 1 peso notes issued in 1870.

Two private banks issued paper money. The Banco Nacional de Santo Domingo issued notes between 1869 and 1889 in denominations of 25 and 50 centavos, 1, 2, 5, 10, 20, 25 and 100 pesos. The Banco de la Compañía de Crédito de Puerto Plata issued notes from the 1880s until 1899 in denominations of 25 and 50 centavos, 1, 2, 5, 10 and 50 pesos. Note that the Banco Nacional de Santo Domingo also issued notes in 1912 denominated in dollars (called pesos in the Spanish text).

=== Peso Oro, 1947-2011 ===
When the peso oro was first introduced as a local coinage in 1937, no paper money was made and US notes continued to circulate as the U.S. dollar was officially the national currency. Only in 1947 were the first peso oro notes issued by the Central Bank in denominations of 1, 5, 10, 20, 50, 500, and 1000 oros, though the latter two denominations were rarely used. These notes were printed by the American Bank Note Company, a private printing and engraving firm. Though US notes were always acceptable in exchange, they were gradually withdrawn from circulation. In 1961, low value notes were issued in denominations of 10, 25 and 50 centavos to help compensate for the value of silver in coins surpassing face value and the resulting coin shortages. Following the demise of Trujillo all banknotes afterwards dropped references to the capital city Ciudad Trujillo which had reverted to its old name, Santo Domingo.

Banknotes currently in circulation are 50, 100, 200, 500, 1000 and 2000 pesos oros. The 10 and 20 peso denomination bills have been replaced with 10 and 25 peso coins respectively in 2005. In 2010, a new 20 pesos oro polymer banknote was released. Limited editions of the 500 and 2000 peso oro notes were issued for the 1992 500th anniversary of the discovery of the Americas and year 2000 millennial celebrations, respectively, but as of 2005 not many of these remain in circulation. A 5000 pesos note has been considered before but not made.

All current banknotes carry the phrase "Este billete tiene fuerza libertoria para el pago de todas las obligaciónes públicas o privadas". Literally translated, (Spanish: This bill has the liberatory strength to be used as payment for all public or private obligations).

=== 2010 ===
On July 1, 2010, the Central Bank of Dominican Republic issued a 20-peso oro banknote that is similar to the previous paper issue, but is now printed on a polymer substrate.

=== 2011 ===
In 2011, the Central Bank of Dominican Republic announced that all banknotes dated 2011 and later will be denominated in "Pesos Dominicanos" instead of "Pesos Oro". This decision was made in response to a mandate of the Constitution of the Dominican Republic of January 26, 2010.

=== 2014 ===
On October 1, 2014, the Central Bank of Dominican Republic planned to issue a new family of notes with new designs and new security features.

== Notes in circulation ==
Banknotes		Value	Color	Description	
Front	Reverse	Value	Color	Front	Reverse
		50 Pesos	Purple	Basilica Cathedral of Santa María la Menor	Basilica of Our Lady of Altagracia
		100 Pesos	Orange	Francisco del Rosario Sánchez, Juan Pablo Duarte and Matías Ramón Mella	The Count's Gate
		200 Pesos	Pink	Mirabal Sisters	Monument to the Mirabal Sisters
		500 Pesos	Green	Salomé Ureña and Pedro Henríquez Ureña	Central Bank of the Dominican Republic
		1,000 Pesos	Red	National Palace	Columbus Alcazar
		2,000 Pesos	Blue	Emilio Prud'Homme and José Rufino Reyes Siancas (composers of the national anthem of the Dominican Republic)	National Theater

== Other bills ==
Image		Value	Description	
Front	Reverse	Value	Front	Reverse
		10 Pesos Oro	Juan Pablo Duarte	Ingenio Rio Haina Sugar cane factory
		10 Pesos Oro	Juan Pablo Duarte	Ingenio Rio Haina Sugar cane factory
		20 Pesos Oro	Francisco del Rosario Sánchez	Valdesia Dam
		50 Pesos Oro	Basilica de Higuey	
		100 Pesos Oro	Gregorio Luperón	Panteón Nacional
		1000 Pesos Oro	Gregorio Luperón	Panteón Nacional
		2000 Pesos Oro	Gregorio Luperón	Panteón Nacional

== Relation with the U.S. dollar ==
The United States dollar is used as a reserve currency by the Central Bank of the Dominican Republic. Also, when agreed by both parties, both U.S. dollars and the euro can be used in private transactions (this applies mostly in tourism-related activities). This was most true during the drastic inflationary period of 2003–2004. Nowadays the U.S. dollar is widely accepted and tourists visiting the Dominican Republic can use it as a second currency.

== Historical exchange rates ==
Historically, since the first monetary emission in 1948, the peso was at parity with the United States dollar.

The exchange rate for U.S. dollar vs. Dominican peso over the last few decades is as follows:

- 1984 US$1 to RD$1.45
- 1993 US$1 to RD$5
- 1998 US$1 to RD$8
- 2002 US$1 to RD$20
- 2003 US$1 to RD$37.5
- 2004 US$1 to RD$46.7
- 2006 US$1 to RD$32
- 2007 US$1 to RD$35.29
- 2008 US$1 to RD$34.93
- 2009 US$1 to RD$36
- 2012 US$1 to RD$40.5
- 2013 US$1 to RD$40.4
- 2016 US$1 to RD$45

In 2004 the peso dramatically plummeted; a single US dollar was worth almost RD$60. In August 2020, RD$59 mark was temporarily crossed again.

As of February 8, 2023, US$1 buys around 56.30 pesos.

As of April 5, 2024, US$1 buys around 59.24 pesos. In September 2024, the U.S. dollar surpassed the RD$60 mark.

Current DOP exchange rates
From Google Finance:	AUD CAD CHF CNY EUR GBP HKD JPY USD JPY USD
From Yahoo! Finance:	AUD CAD CHF CNY EUR GBP HKD JPY USD JPY USD
From XE.com:	AUD CAD CHF CNY EUR GBP HKD JPY USD JPY USD
From OANDA:	AUD CAD CHF CNY EUR GBP HKD JPY USD JPY USD

== See also ==
- Central banks and currencies of the Caribbean
- Cuban peso
- Economy of the Dominican Republic
- Santo Domingo real
