= 2020 in the Dominican Republic =

- Decades: 2000s; 2010s; 2020s
- See also: Other events of 2020; Timeline of Dominican history

Events in the year 2020 in the Dominican Republic.

== Incumbents ==
- President: Danilo Medina (until 16 August), Luis Abinader (starting 16 August)
- Vice President: Margarita Cedeño de Fernández (until 16 August), Raquel Peña de Antuña (starting 16 August)

== Events ==
- 1 January – New Year's Day, national holiday
- 6 January – Day of Kings (Dia de Reyes), national holiday
- 21 January – Our Lady of High Grace, national holiday
- 26 January – Duarte's Birthday, national holiday
- 16 February – 2020 Dominican Republic municipal elections: Software problems force the suspension of the elections.
- 27 February – Independence Day, national holiday
- 10 April – Good Friday, national holiday
- 12 April - Easter, national holiday
- 1 May - Labour Day, national holiday
- 31 May – Mother's Day
- 11 June – Corpus Christi, national holiday
- 26 July - Father's Day
- 16 August – Restoration Day, national holiday
- 24 September - Our Lady of Mercy (Nuestra Senora de las Mercedes), national holiday
- 6 November - Constitution Day, national holiday
- 25 December - Christmas Day, national holiday
- 16 February – 2020 Dominican Republic municipal elections: Software problems force the suspension of the elections.
- 27 February – Independence Day, Dominican Republic
- 28 February – The Dominican Republic refuses to allow a British cruise ship to dock due to fears of COVID-19. The ship heads to St. Maarten.
- 1 March – First confirmed case of COVID-19 in the Dominican Republic.
- 16 April – Forty-two people die after drinking adulterated alcohol from three clandestine distilleries in the Dominican Republic.
- 5 July – In the 2020 Dominican Republic general election, Luis Abinader is elected president.
- 31 July – Hurricane Isaias batters the Dominican Republic, killing two.
- 23 August – Tropical Storm Laura, which would later become Hurricane Laura, kills four people, and causes nearly 1.1 million people to lose power.
- 25 August – The Dominican Republic is the only member of the United Nations Security Council to support an effort by the United States to "snap back" sanctions against Iran.
- 31 August – Authorities break up a gang that falsified Spanish passports to facilitate emigration.

== Deaths ==
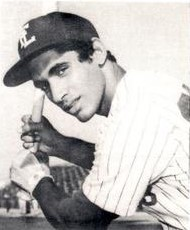
Dámaso García

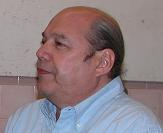
Víctor Víctor

- 4 January – Puerto Plata, musician (b. 1923).
- 15 February – Tony Fernández, 57, baseball player (b. 1962).
- 24 March – Jenny Polanco, fashion designer (b. 1958); COVID-19.
- 15 April – Dámaso García, 63, baseball player (b. 1957).
- 16 July – Víctor Víctor, singer-songwriter and guitarist (b. 1948); COVID-19.
- 19 December – Carmen Quidiello, 105, playwright and poet, former First Lady (b. 1915).

== See also ==
- COVID-19 pandemic in the Dominican Republic
- 2020 in the Caribbean
- 2020 in Haiti
- 2020 Atlantic hurricane season
