= 2026 in the Dominican Republic =

- Decades: 2000s; 2010s; 2020s
- See also: Other events of 2026; Timeline of Dominican history

Events in the year 2026 in the Dominican Republic.

== Incumbents ==
- President: Luis Abinader
- Vice President: Raquel Peña de Antuña

== Events ==
=== February ===
- 2 February – The decapitated bodies of four Haitian women are found near the southern section of the Dominican Republic–Haiti border.
- 23 February – A fault in a transmission line switch causes a nationwide blackout.

=== March ===
- 1 March – A bus crashes in La Romana, killing two people.

=== May ===
- 12 May – The Dominican Republic reaches an agreement with the United States to host migrants deported from the latter country.

=== June ===
- 7 June – An aircraft crashes near La Romana, killing its two American crew.
- 19 June – An Italian national is killed in a fire that destroys the Viva Dominicus Beach by Wyndham resort in Bayahibe and displaces 1,690 occupants.

=== July ===
- 24 July – The United States imposes a 12.5% tariff on the Dominican Republic, citing the presence of alleged forced labor in the supply chain.
- 24 July–8 August – 2026 Central American and Caribbean Games

=== September ===
- 5 September – Joheirry Mola is crowned Miss World 2026 in Vietnam.

=== October ===
- 24 October – The Dominican Republic deploys 10,000 soldiers to along its border with Haiti amid the Salvadoran military intervention in Haiti.

=== Predicted and scheduled ===
- TBA – 10th Summit of the Americas

== Holidays ==
- 1 January – New Year's Day
- 12 January – Epiphany
- 21 January – Our Lady of High Grace
- 26 January – Duarte's Birthday
- 27 February – Independence Day
- 3 April – Good Friday
- 4 May – Labour Day
- 4 June – Corpus Christi
- 16 August – Restoration Day
- 24 September – Our Lady of Mercy
- 9 November – Constitution Day
- 25 December – Christmas Day

== Deaths ==
- 1 June – Bruce Van Sant, 88, American-born sailor and author.
- 17 July – Gabriel Antonio Camilo González, 88, Roman Catholic prelate, bishop of La Vega (1992–2015).
- 6 September – Johan Mijail, 36, writer and performer
- 4 November – Jesús María de Jesús Moya, 88, Roman Catholic prelate, auxiliary bishop of Santiago de los Caballeros (1977–1984) and bishop of San Francisco de Macorís (1984–2012).
