= 2025 in the Dominican Republic =

- Decades: 2000s; 2010s; 2020s
- See also: Other events of 2025; Timeline of Dominican history

Events in the year 2025 in the Dominican Republic.

== Incumbents ==
- President: Luis Abinader
- Vice President: Raquel Peña de Antuña

== Events ==
=== January ===
- January 17 – Four people drown off the coast of Punta Cana amid rough conditions.

=== March ===
- March 6 – Disappearance of Sudiksha Konanki

=== April ===
- April 6 – The Dominican Republic significantly tightens border controls and migration enforcement along its border with Haiti, as announced by President Abinader.
- April 8 – Jet Set nightclub roof collapse: At least 232 people are killed in the collapse of the roof at the Jet Set nightclub in Santo Domingo.

=== May ===
- May 18 – Five people are killed in a shooting in Dajabón.

=== June ===
- June 26 – A court in Puerto Plata convicts baseball player Wander Franco of sexually abusing a minor and sentences him to a suspended two-year prison term.

=== July ===
- July 11 – A boat carrying migrants headed for Puerto Rico sinks off the Dominican coast, killing four people and leaving 20 others missing.
- July 28 – Around 1.5 tons of cocaine are seized from the coast of Pedernales, resulting in the arrest of four people including a Colombian national.

=== August ===
- August 18 – One person drowns at Caleta Beach in La Romana amid dangerous swimming conditions caused by Hurricane Erin.
- August 28 – Nine people, including a former prosecutor, are sentenced to up to 10 years' imprisonment for erasing the criminal records of thousands of convicted individuals from 2017 to 2023.

=== September ===
- 10 September – Five suspected gang members are shot dead by police in disputed circumstances in Santiago de los Caballeros. Eleven police officers are arrested on 30 September as part of an investigation into the killings.
- 21 September – Authorities announce the seizure of 377 packages of cocaine from a speedboat destroyed by the US Navy in an anti-narcotics operation off Beata Island.

=== October ===
- 20 October – A magnitude 5.0 earthquake hits San José de Ocoa Province, injuring 12 people.
- 21 October – Eighty miners are rescued following a collapse at the Cerro de Maimón Mine.
- 28 October – At least four people are killed nationwide in adverse weather conditions caused by Hurricane Melissa.

=== November ===
- 11 November – A shutdown of generation units at the San Pedro de Macorís and Quisqueya Power Plants causes a nationwide blackout.
- 19 November – The Constitutional Court of the Dominican Republic strikes down as discriminatory a ban on gay sex in the Dominican Republic National Police and the Armed Forces of the Dominican Republic.
- 26 November – President Abinader authorizes the United States to temporarily refuel aircraft and transport equipment and technical personnel at restricted areas within the San Isidro Air Base and Las Américas International Airport as part of its anti-narcotics operations.

=== December ===
- 15 December – A judge sentences seven former government officials to over a year in preventative detention in a US$250 million corruption case involving the National Health Insurance agency.

== Holidays ==
- 1 January – New Year's Day
- 6 January – Epiphany
- 21 January – Our Lady of High Grace
- 26 January – Duarte's Birthday
- 27 February – Independence Day
- 18 April – Good Friday
- 21 April – Easter Monday
- 5 May – Labour Day
- 5 June – Corpus Christi
- 16 August – Restoration Day
- 24 September – Our Lady of Mercy
- 3 November – Constitution Day
- 25 December – Christmas Day

== Deaths ==
- 8 April – Notable individuals killed in the Jet Set nightclub roof collapse:
  - Tony Blanco, 44, baseball player (Chunichi Dragons, Yokohama DeNA BayStars, Orix Buffaloes)
  - Nelsy Cruz, 42, politician, governor of Monte Cristi Province (since 2020)
  - Octavio Dotel, 51, baseball player (Houston Astros, St. Louis Cardinals, New York Mets)
  - Rubby Pérez, 69, merengue singer
- 12 August – Antonio Isa Conde, 85, politician, minister of energy and mines (2015–2020).
- 26 August – Franklin Domínguez, 94, playwright, theater director, and actor (Ratman, The Lost City).

== See also ==
- 2025 Atlantic hurricane season
