= Joel Lopez =

Joel Lopez may refer to:

- Joël Lopez (footballer, born 1960), French midfielder for FC Girondins de Bordeaux
- Joel López (footballer, born 1982), Paraguayan forward for Deportes Melipilla
- Joel López (footballer, born 2002), Spanish left-back for Celta Fortuna
- Joel López Pissano, Argentine midfielder for C.S. Emelec
- Jhoel Lopez, see Shooting of David Ortiz
