= Landestoy =

Landestoy is a surname. Notable people with the surname include:

- Bullumba Landestoy (1925–2018), Dominican pianist and composer
- Rafael Landestoy (born 1953), Dominican baseball player
