= 2021 in the Dominican Republic =

- Decades: 2000s; 2010s; 2020s
- See also: Other events of 2021; Timeline of Dominican history

Events in the year 2021 in the Dominican Republic.

== Incumbents ==
- President: Luis Abinader (starting 2020)
- Vice President: Raquel Peña de Antuña (starting 2020)

== Events ==
- January 6 – The government condemns violence in the 2021 storming of the United States Capitol.
- February 27 – The government says it will fence the border between the DR and Haiti in order to curb migration and other illegal activities.

== Deaths ==
- January 7 – Norberto James Rawlings, 75, poet; complications from Parkinson's disease.
- January 8 – Enrique Pérez y Pérez, 97, military officer, Head of the Armed Forces (1966-1971, 1972-1975, 1978).
- January 10 – Pedro González, 83, baseball player (New York Yankees, Cleveland Indians).
- January 20 – Juan Bautista Sánchez Peralta (″Juanchy″), 64, part owner of Águilas Cibaeñas baseball team; COVID-19 (b. 1956).
- February 15 – Johnny Pacheco, 85, musician (Fania All-Stars) and label executive (Fania Records), complications from pneumonia.
- March 23 – Hugo Cabrera, 67, basketball player; pancreatic cancer.
- April 6 – Jack Veneno, 78, professional wrestler (WWC) and politician; pancreatic cancer.

== See also ==
- COVID-19 pandemic in the Dominican Republic
- 2021 in the Caribbean
- 2021 Atlantic hurricane season
