= 2017 in the Dominican Republic =

- Decades: 1990s; 2000s; 2010s; 2020s
- See also: Other events of 2017; Timeline of Dominican history

Events in the year 2017 in the Dominican Republic.

== Incumbents ==
- President: Danilo Medina
- Vice President: Margarita Cedeño de Fernández

== Events ==
=== January ===
- 22 January: Organized protests in Santo Domingo and other areas of the country begin, advocating for legal justice in recent corruption scandals such as the Odebrecht case. Protestors dress in Green, to symbolize what they dubbed the 'Green Wave' due to the protest's environmentalist themes.
- 23 January: The movie Carpinteros premieres at the 2017 Sundance Film Festival, it will go on to win its director the Havana Star Prize for Best Director at the 2017 Havana Film Festival New York.

=== February ===
- 1–2 February: Mevlüt Çavuşoğlu, Turkish Minister of Foreign Affairs, has an official visit to the Dominican Republic hosted by Minister of Foreign Affairs Miguel Vargas at the Palacio Nacional in Santo Domingo. During the visit, they sign an agreement on tourism between the nations.
- 23 February: The Dominican Republic signs a protocol beginning diplomatic relations with the country of Malta.

=== March ===
- 31 March: Congresswoman Jacqueline Montero and Minister of Women's Affairs Janet Camilo speaks at a Latin American LGBTQ+ conference in Santo Domingo.

=== May ===
- 4–7 May: The 32nd Pan American Road Cycling Championships is held in Santo Domingo with 27 American nations participating.

=== July ===
- 16 July: Protests as part of the so-called Green Wave occur in the capital Santo Domingo in reaction to corruption scandal leaks; tens of thousands are in attendance.

=== August ===
- 3 August: The drama Cocote is released at the 2017 Locarno Film Festival.
- 27 August: The 2017 Liga Dominicana de Fútbol Final (Club Atlético Pantoja vs Atlántico FC) is held in Santo Domingo, Atlántico wins after a penalty shoot-out.

=== October ===
- 13–15 October: Pool A of the 2017 Women's NORCECA Volleyball Championship is held in Santo Domingo, the Dominican Republic's team wins all 3 of their games and qualifies for the 2018 FIVB Volleyball Women's World Championship.

=== November ===
- The Comedy Colao premieres in Dominican theaters.

=== December ===
- 1 December: During the 2017 Venezuelan protests, negotiations resume between Nicolas Maduro's Venezuelan government and the country's primary opposition coalition held in the Dominican Republic.

== Deaths ==
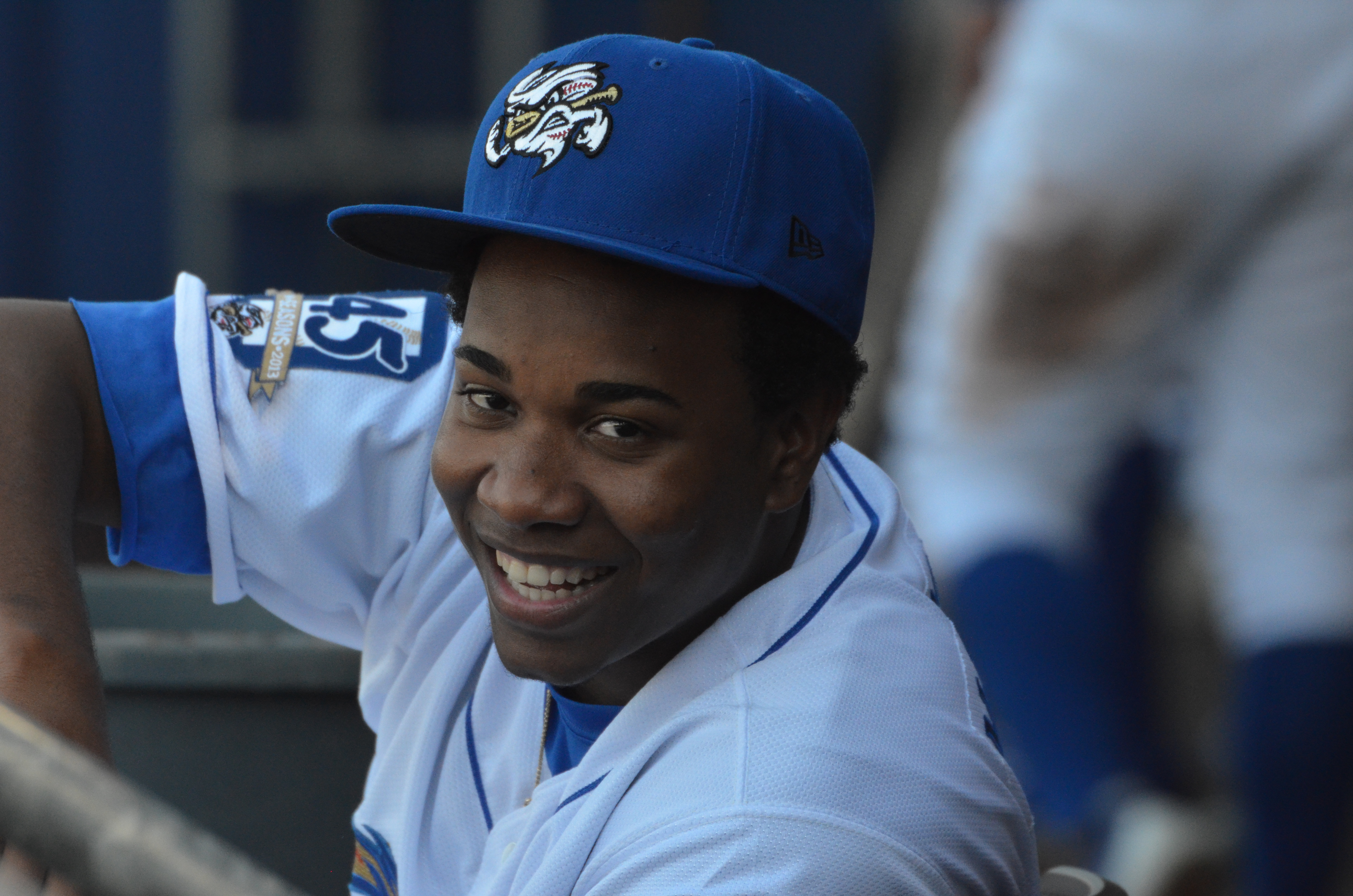
Yordano Ventura

- 22 January – Andy Marte, baseball player (b. 1983).
- 22 January – Yordano Ventura, baseball player (b. 1991).
- 2 April – Rafael Molina Morillo, newspaper editor and diplomat (b. 1930).
- 5 May – Amancio Escapa Aparicio, Auxiliary Bishop of Santo Domingo (b. 1938)
- 5 June – Héctor Wagner, baseball player (b. 1968).
- 15 July – Plaiter Reyes, Olympic weightlifter (b. 1970).
- 11 December – Manny Jiménez, baseball player (b. 1936).
