= 2023 in the Dominican Republic =

- Decades: 2000s; 2010s; 2020s
- See also: Other events of 2023; Timeline of Dominican history

Events in the year 2023 in the Dominican Republic.

== Incumbents ==
- President: Luis Abinader
- Vice President: Raquel Peña de Antuña

== Events ==
Ongoing: COVID-19 pandemic in the Dominican Republic

- August 14 – Eleven people are killed, ten missing and 30 others are injured in an explosion at a market in San Cristóbal.
- August 16 – The death toll from the August 14 explosion in San Cristobal rises to 13 after two more bodies are found.
- September 11 – The Dominican Republic suspends the issuance of visas for Haitians and announces plans to close its border with Haiti by Thursday.
- October 11 – The Dominican Republic partially reopens its border with Haiti for some commercial activity after closing it last month.
- October 20 – November 5: Dominican Republic at the 2023 Pan American Games.

== See also ==
- COVID-19 pandemic in the Dominican Republic
- 2023 Atlantic hurricane season
