= Monina Solá =

Dominican actress

- Born: 23 May 1933
- Died: 29 April 2023 (aged 89)
- Occupation: Actress
- Years active: 1930s–2020s
- Spouse: Luis Homero Lajara Burgos
- Children: 4

Monina Solá (23 May 1933 – 29 April 2023) was a Dominican actress who appeared in hundreds of productions, mostly theatrical but also including radio and television.

== Biography ==
Monina Solá was born on 23 May 1933 to José Narciso Solá, an actor and playwright from the nearby American island of Puerto Rico. She made her debut at the age of four in the theatre company he owned, and as a teenager she joined the Teatro de Bellas Artes.

She appeared in more than two hundred theatrical productions, most of which were by Franklin Domínguez and including a reading of Death of a Salesman directed by Flor de Bethania Abreu, as well as in radio and television work. Listín Diario called her "a star figure on the Dominican stage and mentor to several generations of theater artists". She also inaugurated the 2008 opening of the Narciso González Cultural Center in Villa Juana, Santo Domingo; it also has a theatre named after her.

In 2009, she was one of several women honored with an appearance at the 5th Mujeres de Éxito Vestidas de Esperanza catwalk. She was honored by the Ministry of Culture on International Women's Day 2015. Among Momina's accolades were the Knight and Commander of the Order of Merit of Duarte, Sánchez and Mella, a portrait at the Dominican Theater Gallery, and one of the Casandra Awards.

In 2009, she was invited by Jimmy Sierra to appear in his documentary on the history of theatre in the Dominican Republic, the first of its kind. She also had a documentary by Ivan Ruiz, Homenaje a Monina Solá, orgullo nacional, as well as a dedicated tribute programme by the Telemicro channel Digital 15, Que se sepa.

In addition to two children with a previous husband, she had two children with her next husband, Chief of Staff of the Dominican Navy Luis Homero Lajara Burgos.

She died on 29 April 2023, after spending five years with Alzheimer's disease. She was 89. She was buried in Jardin Memorial Cemetery on 30 April 2023. Her son Homero Luis Lajara Solá later wrote a book on her, Monina Solá, leyenda del teatro dominicano, released the same year as her death.

== Filmography ==
Year	Title	Note	Ref.
2009	Ojalá hoy fuera ayer	By Franklin Domínguez	
