= 2022 in the Dominican Republic =

- Decades: 2000s; 2010s; 2020s
- See also: Other events of 2022; Timeline of Dominican history

Events in the year 2022 in the Dominican Republic.

== Incumbents ==
- President: Luis Abinader
- Vice President: Raquel Peña de Antuña

== Events ==
Ongoing: COVID-19 pandemic in the Dominican Republic

- February 17 – The Dominican Republic ends all COVID-19-related public health measures, including mask wearing mandates and use of vaccine passes in order to enter public places, despite not reaching 70% of its vaccination target.
- May 3 – Carlos Guillén Tatis, the agriculture counselor at the Dominican Republic's embassy in Haiti, is kidnapped in Croix-des-Bouquets, Haiti.
- June 6 – Orlando Jorge Mera, the Environmental Minister for the Dominican Republic and son of former President Salvador Jorge Blanco, is shot dead in his office. The perpetrator was identified by a presidential spokesman as Miguel Cruz, a childhood friend of the minister. He was later taken into custody.
- July 7 - The Dominican Republic reports its first case of monkeypox.

== Deaths ==
- January 22 – Agripino Núñez Collado, 88, Roman Catholic clergyman.
- March 7 – Ramón Báez Romano, 93, golfer and politician.
- March 10 – Odalis Pérez, 44, baseball player.
- March 21 – Rosa Gómez de Mejía, 82, former first lady.
- June 6 – Orlando Jorge Mera, 55, lawyer and politician.
- June 16 – Ivonne Haza, 83, operatic soprano.
- July 3 – Idelisa Bonnelly, 90, marine biologist.
- July 23 – Julio Valdez, 66, baseball player.

== See also ==
- COVID-19 pandemic in the Dominican Republic
- 2022 Atlantic hurricane season
