= Erasmo Vásquez =

Dominican doctor and politician (died 2021)

- Born: c. 1948
- Died: April 22, 2021 (aged 72–73); Santiago de los Caballeros, Dominican Republic
- Resting place: Funeraria Blandino de La Vega
- Relatives: Hector Acosta (son-in-law)

Erasmo Vásquez (circia 1948 – 22 April 2021) was a Dominican physician and politician.

== Biography ==
Between 1966 and 1998 Vásquez served as minister of Public Health under the government of Leonel Fernández. He was also president of the Dominican Medical College under Danilo Medina's presidency.

During the COVID-19 pandemic in the Dominican Republic, he called for a national plan and the use of Ivermectin against COVID-19. He died from COVID-19 on 22 April 2021 at the Santiago Medical Union of Santiago de los Caballeros, following his admission to hospital in March 2021.
