= Víctor Víctor =

Dominican guitarist (1948–2020)

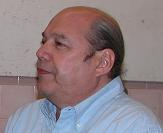

Víctor Víctor (born Víctor José Víctor Rojas; 11 December 1948 – 16 July 2020) was a Dominican guitarist, singer and composer.

Víctor was born in Santiago de los Caballeros, Dominican Republic to José Víctor (father) and Avelina Rojas (mother).

He was the founder of the Nueva Forma musical group in the 1970s. Many of the major Dominican singers of the time period had song composed by Victor, including Wilfrido Vargas and Juan Luis Guerra. It was through his own music activity that a composition of his in 1991 became international popular and resulted in him conducting tours throughout the Spanish-speaking world.

He was also one of the first Dominican artists to travel to Cuba, when this type of travel was not allowed by the Dominican government.

In 2007 he recorded an album with social-themed songs titled Verde y Negro as a tribute to the freedom fighters of the Dominican people.

Víctor died from COVID-19 during the COVID-19 pandemic in the Dominican Republic on 16 July 2020 at a hospital in Santo Domingo, aged 71.

== Discography ==
- Álbum Rojo (1973)
- Chile Vive (1974)
- Neruda Raíz y Geografía (1974)
- Cotidiano (1975)
- Con Sus Flores y Sus Vainas (1976)
- En Son de Felicidad (with Francis Santana) (1982)
- Artistas por la Paz / Cara o Cruz (with José Antonio Rodríguez) (1986)
- Flamboyán (1987)
- Inspiraciones (1990)
- Tu Corazón (1993)
- Un Chin de Veneno (1994)
- Alma de Barrio (1994)
- Cajita de Música (1996)
- Recuento I (1998)
- Pisando Rayas (2001)
- Bachata Entre Amigos (2006)
- Verde y Negro (2007)
- Rojo Rosa (2009)

== Hot Latin Songs ==
- Mesita de Noche (#5)
- Ando Buscando Un Amor (#6)
- Así Es Mi Amor (#8)
- Tú Corazón (#19)
