= 2018 in the Dominican Republic =

- Decades: 1990s; 2000s; 2010s; 2020s
- See also: Other events of 2018; Timeline of Dominican history

Events in the year 2018 in the Dominican Republic.

== Incumbents ==
- President: Danilo Medina
- Vice President: Margarita Cedeño de Fernández

== Deaths ==
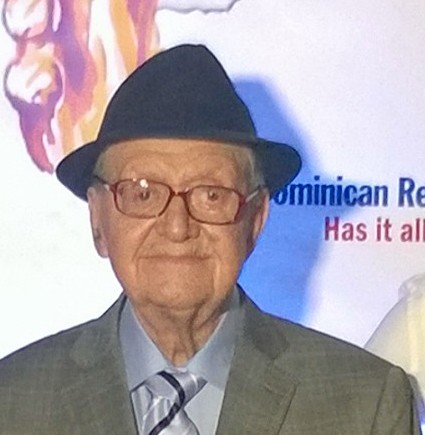
Bullumba Landestoy

- 31 May – Joseíto Mateo, merengue singer (b. 1920).
- 17 July – Bullumba Landestoy, pianist and composer (b. 1925).
- 4 November – José Rafael Abinader, politician, lawyer and writer (b. 1929).
