= 2024 in the Dominican Republic =

- Decades: 2000s; 2010s; 2020s
- See also: Other events of 2024; Timeline of Dominican history

Events in the year 2024 in the Dominican Republic.

== Incumbents ==
- President: Luis Abinader
- Vice President: Raquel Peña de Antuña

== Events ==
- February 18 – 2024 Dominican Republic municipal elections
- May 19 – 2024 Dominican Republic general election: Luis Abinader is reelected President while his Modern Revolutionary Party wins a supermajority in the Congress of the Dominican Republic.
- August 6 – The skeletal remains of 14 individuals believed to be from Senegal and Mauritania are found on an abandoned boat off the coast of Río San Juan.
- August 16 – Luis Abinader is sworn in for a second term as President of the Dominican Republic.
- September 1 – A truck crashes into a bar in Azua, killing 11 people and injuring 40 others.
- October 2 – The government announces plans to deport 10,000 Haitian immigrants on a weekly basis.
- October 16 - November 3 - The 2024 FIFA U-17 Women's World Cup, which was won by North Korea.
- December 6 – Authorities announce the largest seizure of illegal drugs in the country's history after 9.5 tons of cocaine are found inside a banana shipment travelling from Guatemala to Belgium that stopped at the Multimodal Caucedo Port.

== Deaths ==
- January 31 – Víctor Pinales, 59, actor.

== See also ==
- COVID-19 pandemic in the Dominican Republic
- 2024 Atlantic hurricane season
