= 2019 in the Dominican Republic =

- Decades: 1990s; 2000s; 2010s; 2020s
- See also: Other events of 2019; Timeline of Dominican history

Events in the year 2019 in the Dominican Republic.

== Incumbents ==
- President: Danilo Medina
- Vice President: Margarita Cedeño de Fernández

== Events ==
- 9 June – Shooting of David Ortiz in Santo Domingo Este

== Deaths ==
- 7 January – Alanna Lockward, curator, writer and filmmaker (b. 1961).
- 28 January – Yoskar Sarante, bachata singer (b. 1970).
- 12 March – Alberto Lois, baseball player (b. 1956).
- 20 April – Braulio Lara, baseball player (b. 1988).
