= Antonio Isa Conde =

Dominican politician (1940–2025)

Antonio Isa Conde (Spanish: [anˈtonjo ˈisa ˈkonde]; 14 March 1940 – 12 August 2025) was a Dominican politician.

== Life and career ==
Isa Conde was born in San Francisco de Macorís on 14 March 1940, graduating from the UASD with a doctorate of Law. He founded the Federation of Dominican Students and was a member of the Provisional University Council.

During the Dominican Civil War in 1965, Isa Conde fought with the Command of 55 Espaillat Street. He held the position of Minister of Energy and Mines from 2015 to 2020.

In 2015, he published an autobiography titled "Relatos de la vida de un desmemoriado" (Tales from the life of a forgetful man), which was honored by the National Library of Lebanon in 2022.

Isa Conde died in Miami on 12 August 2025, at the age 85, whilst receiving medical care.
