= Amancio Escapa Aparicio =

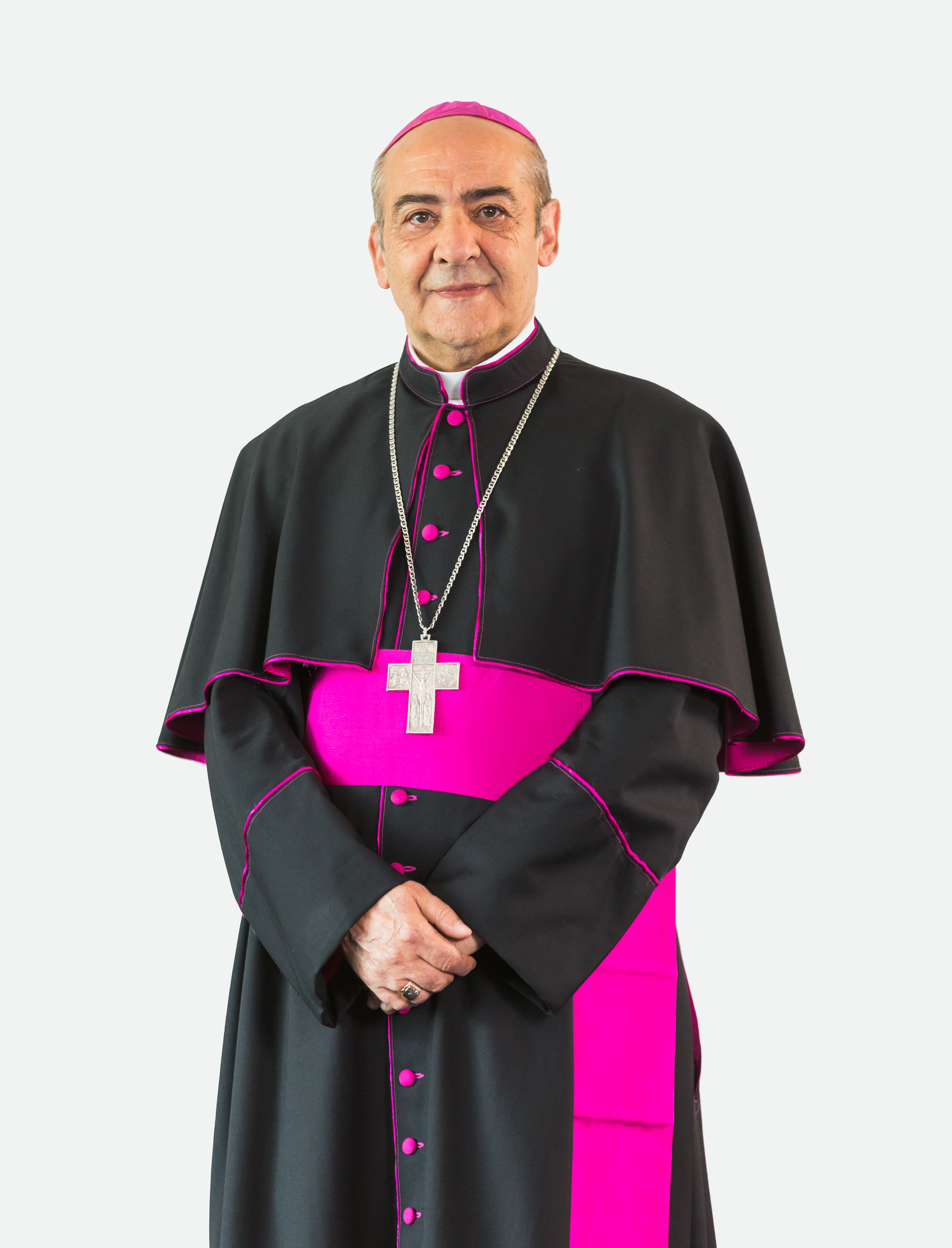
Amancio Escapa Aparicio, 2014

Amancio Escapa Aparicio OCD (30 March 1938 – 5 May 2017) was a Roman Catholic bishop.

Born in Spain, Escapa Aparicio was ordained to the priesthood in 1962. He served as titular bishop of Cenae and as auxiliary bishop of the Roman Catholic Archdiocese of Santo Domingo from 1996 until 2016.
