= 1965 in the Dominican Republic =

- Decades: 1940s; 1950s; 1960s; 1970s; 1980s
- See also: Other events of 1965; Timeline of Dominican history

The following lists events that happened during 1965 in the Dominican Republic.

== Incumbents ==
- President:
  - until 25 April: Triumvirate
  - 25 April: Revolutionary Committee
  - 25–27 April: José Rafael Molina Ureña
  - 27 April–4 May: Vacant
  - 1–7 May: Military Junta
  - 7 May–30 August: Government of National Reconstruction
  - 30 August–3 September: Vacant
  - 4 May–3 September: Francisco Caamaño
  - starting 3 September: Héctor García-Godoy
- Vice President:
  - until 25 April: Triumvirate
  - May–3 September: Vacant
  - starting 3 September: Manuel Joaquín Castillo

== Events ==
- Dominican Civil War:
  - April 24 - officers and civilians loyal to deposed President Juan Bosch mutiny against the right-wing junta running the country, setting up a provisional government.
  - April 28 - Forces loyal to the deposed military-imposed government stage a countercoup, supported by U.S. troops sent by President Lyndon B. Johnson, "for the stated purpose of protecting U.S. citizens and preventing an alleged Communist takeover of the country", thus thwarting the possibility of "another Cuba".

== See also ==
- 1965 in the environment
