= Joel López (footballer, born 1982) =

Paraguayan footballer

Personal information
- Full name: Joel López
- Date of birth: 22 October 1982 (age 44)
- Place of birth: Paraguay
- Position: Forward

Senior career*
Years	Team	Apps	(Gls)
2007	River Plate		
2008	Deportes Melipilla	4	(1)
- * Club domestic league appearances and goals

Joel López (born 22 October 1982) is a Paraguayan footballer who plays as a forward. He is currently a free agent.

== Career ==
López had a senior career spell with River Plate, with the club in the 2007 Paraguayan Tercera División. In 2008, Chilean Primera División side Deportes Melipilla signed López. He scored one goal, versus Cobresal on 16 March, in four appearances as the club were relegated to the 2009 Primera B de Chile.

== Career statistics ==
As of 25 October 2018.

Club statistics
Club	Season	League			Cup		League Cup		Continental		Other		Total	
Club	Season	Division	Apps	Goals	Apps	Goals	Apps	Goals	Apps	Goals	Apps	Goals	Apps	Goals
Deportes Melipilla	2008	Primera División	4	1	—		—		—		0	0	4	1
Career total			4	1	—		—		—		0	0	4	1
