= Bruce Van Sant =

American-born-Dominican author and sailor (1937/1938–2026)

Bruce Van Sant (1937 or 1938 – 1 June 2026) was an American-born-Dominican sailor and author.

== Life and career ==
Bruce Van Sant was born in San Francisco, California.

He published A Gentleman's Guide to Passages South in 1998. The book is considered to be amongst the best resources for sailors in the Caribbean.

Van Sant died in Puerto Plata on 1 June 2026, at the age of 88.
