= 2017–2018 Dominican Republic protests =

The 2017–2018 protests in the Dominican Republic, also known as Green Wave or Green Revolution, was an event held on January 22, 2017 in Santo Domingo, Dominican Republic, and simultaneously in other locations in the interior of the country and Dominican communities abroad. The march was called by a group of civil society organizations demanding that all those involved in corruption scandals be brought to justice, mainly in the Odebrecht case that involves the Brazilian transnational company Odebrecht in the payment of bribes to officials of three Dominican governments (administrations of Hipólito Mejía, Leonel Fernández and Danilo Medina) between 2001 and 2014.

The protests occurred against corruption and impunity, led by people dressed in green clothes waving green flags, chanting and clapping for the resignation of the corrupt politicians in the government. In July, Marches were held in response to corruption leaks by tens of thousands of protesters in Santo Domingo. Protests were also held throughout 2018 in continuation of the protests and demonstrations that occurred in 2017, and nationwide anti-corruption protests were staged peacefully and largely by the opposition and activists.

== See also ==
- 2020 Dominican Republic protests
