= Shooting of David Ortiz =

Criminal incident in the Dominican Republic

- Location: 18.488452°N 69.869243°W; Dial Bar and Lounge, Santo Domingo Este, Dominican Republic
- Date: June 9, 2019; 7 years ago 8:50 p.m. (UTC−04:00)
- Target: Sixto David Fernandez
- Attack type: Shooting
- Weapon: 9mm Browning Hi-Power semi-automatic pistol
- Deaths: 0
- Injuries: David Ortiz; Jhoel López
- Perpetrators: Alberto Miguel Rodriguez Mota; Rolfi Ferreira Cruz
- Accused: 13
- Convicted: 10

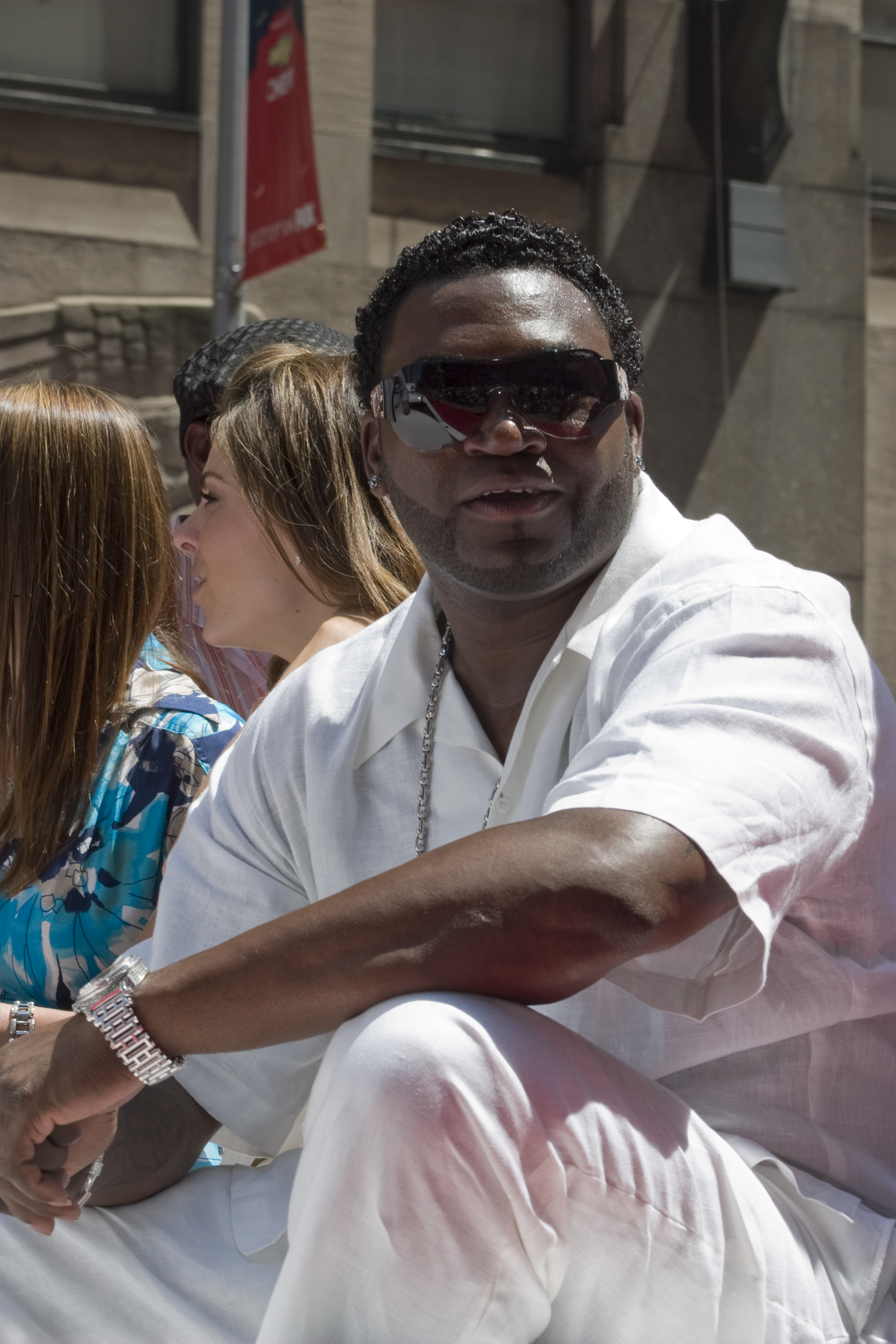
Ortiz in 2008

On the evening of June 9, 2019, the Dominican-American retired professional baseball player David Ortiz, formerly of the Boston Red Sox and Minnesota Twins, was shot and severely wounded while at a bar in Santo Domingo, Dominican Republic. Ortiz survived and received emergency medical treatment, while an investigation quickly resulted in the arrest of several suspects in the attack. The suspected shooter was identified as Rolfi Ferreira Cruz. It was quickly reported that the attack was a paid hit job. On June 19, the Dominican Attorney General announced that Ortiz was shot by mistake, with another person named Sixto David Fernandez being the intended target of the shooting. Accounts of the event changed over time, leading to doubts about the truthfulness of the official account. Thirteen people were ultimately charged with the crime, of which ten, including the alleged shooter and getaway driver, were convicted, while the alleged mastermind of the incident was acquitted due to lack of evidence.

== Background ==
Ortiz was born and raised in the Dominican Republic. Although he has lived in numerous other places during his career and has resided in Miami with his wife Tiffany and two of their children since 2017 (now divorced), he has continued to maintain a home in the Dominican Republic. According to Ortiz's friends in the Dominican Republic, Ortiz often went to popular nightspots with them without any security presence, "trusting his fans to protect him."

== Shooting ==
Security camera footage revealed that on June 9, 2019, at approximately 5:40 p.m. Atlantic Standard Time, one of the suspects involved in the shooting, Alberto Miguel Rodriguez Mota, arrived at the Dial Bar and Lounge in East Santo Domingo. Rodriguez Mota waited for several hours for the arrival of the intended target of the attack, Sixto David Fernandez, a friend of David Ortiz. After Fernandez arrived and sat down at his usual table, Rodriguez Mota took a picture of him, but the picture was blurry, and the black pants being worn by Fernandez were obscured by a white object in the bar.

Rodriguez Mota texted the picture to Jose Eduardo Ciprian, an inmate at 15 de Azua prison. Ciprian then texted the picture to another suspect, Gabriel Alexander Perez Vizcaíno, who showed the picture to several other suspects in a meeting at a gas station. In the interim, however, Ortiz had arrived at the bar wearing white pants and a patterned shirt similar to that being worn by Fernandez, and sat next to Fernandez at the same table. Just prior to the incident, security camera footage showed two men on a motorcycle allegedly planning the attack with a man in a car near the bar where the shooting took place.

At approximately 8:50 p.m. Atlantic Standard Time, Ortiz was "ambushed by a man who got off a motorcycle", saw Ortiz wearing white pants, and shot him with a single bullet in the back. Jhoel López, a Dominican TV host who was with Ortiz, was also wounded in the leg during the shooting.

== Medical response ==
According to Ortiz's spokesperson, Ortiz underwent a six-hour operation performed by three local physicians at the Abel Gonzalez Clinic. During the surgery, a portion of his intestines and colon, as well as his gallbladder, were removed; liver damage was also reported.

On June 10, a medical flight sent by Ortiz's former team, the Boston Red Sox, brought Ortiz to Boston, so he could receive further treatment at Massachusetts General Hospital (MGH). He underwent a second surgery shortly after arriving at MGH, and was reported to be "making good progress toward recovery." A spokesman for Ortiz reported that it was considered to be a good sign that Ortiz was able to walk a few steps "just one day after surgery." Tiffany Ortiz released a statement on June 13 indicating that her husband was "in guarded condition in the surgical intensive care unit," advised that his condition was upgraded to "good" on June 18, and that he was moved out of intensive care on June 22. On July 11, the Red Sox released an update on behalf of Tiffany Ortiz, noting that her husband had undergone a third surgery, at MGH, and was "recovering well and is in good spirits." After more than six weeks at MGH, he was released from the hospital on July 26, 2019.

López, struck by the same bullet that passed through Ortiz, was injured in the right thigh and did not need surgery.

On July 29, in his first Instagram comments since leaving the hospital, Ortiz stated, "too bad I can't crush food yet". He made his first public appearance on September 9, throwing out a ceremonial first pitch at Fenway Park.

== Official investigation and legal response ==
The first person to be arrested was 23-year-old Eddy Feliz Garcia, a local Dominican, who reportedly fell off the motorcycle used to transport the shooter, and was beaten by patrons of the bar before being taken into custody. By June 12, six suspects had been arrested in relation to the shooting, and more were being sought. Police Major General Ney Aldrin Bautista Almonte revealed that the alleged organizer of the attack was promised 400,000 Dominican pesos (approximately $7,800) to carry out the attack. By June 14, eight men and one woman had been arrested and charged in connection with the attack. Police also recovered the gun used in the attack, a Browning Hi-Power 9mm. On June 14, a 10th suspect turned himself in to police. Also on June 14, prosecutors announced that they would reveal the motive and a "full narrative of how the case happened" within the following week. On June 18, law enforcement officials identified an eleventh suspect in police custody, Franklin Junior Merán, whom they alleged to have rented one of the vehicles involved in the attack. Among the suspects arrested was 25-year-old Rolfi Ferreira Cruz (also reported as Rolfi Ferreras Cruz and Rolfy Ferreyra Cruz), who was indicated by authorities to be the suspected shooter. Cruz originated from Reading, Pennsylvania, and was noted to be wanted in connection with several robberies and firearms-related charges in Clifton, New Jersey, while residing in the neighboring city of Paterson. After Cruz was arrested for the shooting, he released a statement from his confinement claiming that Ortiz was "not his intended victim," asserting that although he was hired to kill someone, the intended target was described by what they would be wearing, and that he mistakenly shot Ortiz because he "got confused by his clothing." A Dominican prosecutor initially dismissed Cruz's explanation as a ploy to avoid being assaulted in jail due to Ortiz's popularity in the Dominican Republic. However, a few days later, Dominican Attorney General Jean Alain Rodríguez announced that the shooting had indeed been a case of mistaken identity, with the intended target of the attack being Sixto David Fernandez, a friend of Ortiz who was a frequent visitor to the bar, and who usually sat in the seat occupied by Ortiz at the time of the shooting.

On June 17, Dominican court documents disclosed that Alberto Miguel Rodriguez Mota had been identified as the suspected mastermind of the operation, having allegedly communicated with another suspect a week before the shooting. At the time his name was disclosed, Rodriguez Mota was still at large and being sought. Dominican officials further identified Dominican drug trafficker Víctor Hugo Gómez, a known associate of the Gulf Cartel and a cousin of the intended victim, as having solicited the murder. According to the authorities, Gómez "suspected his relative of betraying him to Dominican drug investigators years earlier." Gómez was arrested by Dominican authorities on June 28, 2019. Following his arrest, it was reported that Gomez was now the suspected mastermind of the shooting.

In a news conference on June 30, Dominican authorities said the price for the shooting was $30,000 and not $7,800 as previously claimed.

=== Named suspects ===
Suspects identified in the investigation include:

- Rolfi Ferreira Cruz, the alleged shooter
- Alberto Miguel Rodriguez Mota, alleged to have taken a picture of the intended victim
- Víctor Hugo Gómez Vasquez, alleged to have solicited the attack. He has also been charged with federal drug trafficking offences in Texas.
- Jose Eduardo Ciprian,a prison inmate alleged to have received and conveyed a picture of the intended victim
- Gabriel Alexander Perez Vizcaíno, alleged to have shown the picture of the intended victim to other suspects
- Luis Alfredo Rivas Clase, also known as “The Surgeon," who allegedly met Vizcaíno hours before the shooting. He was killed in 2021. Rivas Clase had been wanted in connection with an attempted homicide in Pennsylvania
- Eddy Feliz Garcia, alleged to have been on the motorcycle used to transport the shooter
- Franklin Junior Merán, alleged to have rented a vehicle involved in the attack
- Maria Fernanda Villasmil Manzanilla, "The Venezuelan," who was allegedly in the car with Rivas Clase when he met Vizcaíno

=== Trial and convictions ===
Trial was held before the Primer Tribunal Colegiado de la Cámara Penal del Juzgado de Primera Instancia de Santo Domingo (First Collegiate Tribunal of the Criminal Chamber of the Court of First Instance of Santo Domingo), before a three judge panel consisting of judges Elizabeth Rodríguez Espinal (presiding), Julio Aybar Ortiz, and Flor Batista. In December 2022, ten of the thirteen defendants charged in connection with the shooting were found guilty, including the gunman, Cruz, and the motorcycle driver, García. The alleged mastermind, Vásquez, was among the three defendants acquitted, due to insufficient evidence.

== Reactions ==
News of the shooting was met with messages of love and support for Ortiz from many notable figures, particularly those involved with baseball. Among the players sending such messages were Pedro Martínez, Mike Trout, Alex Rodriguez, David Wells, Marcus Stroman, Nelson Figueroa, and Travis Shaw. Eduardo Núñez of the Red Sox, who was born in the Dominican Republic, said it was unimaginable that Ortiz was shot there, and that it was "an international shame." Sports reporter Erin Andrews tweeted a message of support with a Sports Illustrated cover featuring Ortiz posing alongside first responders in the weeks after the Boston Marathon bombing. Former President Barack Obama also tweeted a reminiscence about Ortiz helping the city of Boston recover from the bombing, and "wishing him a speedy recovery of his own."

Later, in response to the official explanation that Ortiz was shot by mistake, Sports Illustrated said it "invites skepticism," while Dan Shaughnessy of The Boston Globe called it "simply not believable." Fernandez, identified as the target of the attack, said that he has no enemies and does not look like Ortiz. Dominicans, including Pedro Martínez, have since expressed divided views on the official account, doubting claims made by the government, but also doubting that Ortiz was the actual target of the attack.

== Private investigation ==
On August 25, 2019, The Boston Globe reported that Ortiz had hired Ed Davis, a former commissioner of the Boston Police Department, to investigate the shooting. In June 2021, the Globe reported that Davis had left the case, saying that the official investigation in the Dominican Republic was ongoing. On March 19, 2022, the Globe reported that Davis had disclosed his findings for the first time, contradicting the official account of the shooting and saying that accused drug kingpin César "The Abuser" Peralta had put a bounty on Ortiz, by whom he felt disrespected. At the time of the shooting, Peralta was wanted in the United States on charges of conspiracy to import cocaine and heroin. He was extradited to Puerto Rico in December 2021. His attorney, who claims Peralta and Ortiz are "close friends", denied that Peralta had any involvement in the shooting, and said that Peralta was part of the crowd outside the clinic that treated Ortiz the night of the shooting. Ortiz, however, said that he had only a casual relationship with Peralta. According to Ortiz's communications adviser, Ortiz asked the Globe to add to his comments that "while David appreciates the thoroughness of [Davis's] report, he awaits further legal action in the Dominican and US courts to bring final clarity and answers on why this happened to him".
