= Jenny Polanco =

Dominican fashion designer (1958–2020)

- Born: Jenny Altagracia Polanco de Léon; January 18, 1958; Santo Domingo, Dominican Republic
- Died: March 24, 2020 (aged 62); Santo Domingo, Dominican Republic
- Occupation: Fashion designer
- Known for: Ready-to-wear women's clothing, jewelry, woven handbags, and other accessories

Jenny Altagracia Polanco de Léon (January 18, 1958 – March 24, 2020) was a Dominican fashion designer. Polanco, whose professional career spanned more than 37 years, was known for ready-to-wear women's clothing, jewelry, woven handbags, and other accessories that incorporated Dominican and Caribbean cultural elements into her collections. Her work was showcased throughout the Caribbean, the United States and Europe, including the Bahamas, New York City, Paris, Puerto Rico, and Miami Fashion Week.

== Biography ==
Polanco was born in Santo Domingo, Dominican Republic, on January 18, 1958. As a child, she began making clothing and costumes for her Barbie dolls. Polanco would later design clothing for herself during college. In 1978, she won Miss Dominican Republic and went on to represent her country as Miss World 1978. She earned her degree in interior design from Universidad Nacional Pedro Henríquez Ureña in Santo Domingo. Polanco then attended Parsons School of Design in New York City, where she studied patternmaking, draping, and tailoring methods, all of which would be incorporated into her professional collections. Additionally, Polanco was also active in the creative arts, including choreography and painting, though fashion remained the major focus of her work.

Polanco's professional career in fashion and the creative arts spanned more than 37 years. She described her own style as "a fluid dialogue between classic avant-garde style and the Caribbean." She often incorporated design elements common in the Dominican Republic and surrounding region into her work, including detailing made from coral, horn, nacre, and larimar, a blue pectolite found only in the Dominican Republic. Polanco was also known for utilizing signature colors, especially amber and white, into her fashions. She used Caribbean amber, found in her country, to craft buttons and jewelry. Her most recent 2020 spring collection featured both pastel and bright colors, as well as floral designs.

Polanco owned several boutiques in the Dominican Republic. She also aided the arts and emerging designers in her country by opening an arts and crafts store called Project.

On March 4, 2020, Polanco returned to the Dominican Republic following a trip to Madrid. She developed coronavirus symptoms five days after returning from Spain and was soon quarantined after testing positive for COVID-19. Polanco was admitted to a Santo Domingo hospital on March 18, 2020, after experiencing breathing difficulties.

Polanco died from complications of COVID-19 at the hospital in Santo Domingo on March 24, 2020, at the age of 62. Polanco was the first public figure to die from the pandemic in the Dominican Republic, as well as the country's sixth COVID-19 victim at the time. Her death was announced by the Dominican Minister of Public Health, Rafael Sánchez Cárdenas.
