= Bullumba Landestoy =

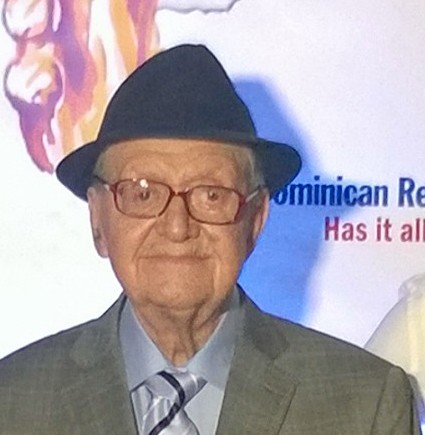

Pedro Rafael Landestoy Duluc, known as Bullumba Landestoy (August 16, 1925 – July 17, 2018) was a Dominican pianist and composer internationally known for his compositions for piano and guitar. He has written numerous popular songs.

== Early life ==
Born on August 16, 1925 in La Romana, he studied at the National Conservatory of Music of Santo Domingo. His first piece for piano (Danza Loca) was composed at 20 years old.

== Career ==
The music composed by Bullumba has been interpreted by musicians of international recognition. Among them, they have interpreted their work for guitar the Dominican Rafael Scarfullery and the Colombian Francisco Roldán. The Dominican pianist María de Fátima Geraldes has recorded the works for piano.

He has written more than 100 songs in the pop genre, gaining international recognition as a composer in the 1950s after escaping the dictatorship of Trujillo and traveling to Mexico and Venezuela. His music has been performed and recorded by many great Latin American singers, especially Celia Cruz, Toña la Negra, Alberto Beltrán, and Vicentico Valdés. During the Golden Age of Mexican cinema, the great Fernando Fernández immortalized his songs "Carita de Angel" and "Mi Dulce Querer", as orchestrated by Chucho Zarzosa.

At the end of the 1950s, Landestoy moved to New York, where he performed as a pianist in various musical groups, including the Lecuona Cuban Boys, directed by the great Ernesto Lecuona. He went to Puerto Rico in 1962 to join the monastery of San Antonio Abad and returned to New York in 1977, where he has lived ever since. Landestoy has focused his interest on the classical music style, a passion he developed at the Conservatorio de la Nación in Santo Domingo, Dominican Republic, where he studied with María Siragusa. He has written 12 pieces for guitar, ten songs of art for soprano and piano, and 27 pieces for piano. He has composed most of his piano and guitar pieces at the San Anotio Abad Monastery in Humacao, Puerto Rico, where he began a spiritual journey in 1962. At the monastery, which is also a university, he taught piano, guitar Classical and composition.

== Death ==
On July 17, 2018, he died at the age of 92 in Dominican Republic.
