= Franklin Domínguez =

Dominican Republic actor and theatre director (1931–2025)

- Born: June 5, 1931; Santiago de los Caballeros, Dominican Republic
- Died: August 26, 2025 (aged 94)
- Occupations: Playwright; theater director; lawyer; actor; politician
- Years active: 1963–2018

Franklin Domínguez (June 5, 1931 – August 26, 2025) was a Dominican playwright, theater director, lawyer, actor, and politician.

== Life and career ==
Dominguez was born in Santiago de los Caballeros on June 5, 1931. He studied acting at the National School of Fine Arts in Santo Domingo. He earned a degree in philosophy and a doctorate in law from the Autonomous University of Santo Domingo. He was Director of Information and Press of the Presidency of the Dominican Republic under five presidents. He was also director of the Teatro de Bellas Artes on two occasions and president of the Society of Dramatic Authors and Composers of the Dominican Republic. He founded the political group Movimiento de Conciliación Nacional, of which he became a presidential candidate. He has been director general of Fine Arts on three occasions and a member of the Society of Dramatic Authors and Composers of Paris.

In 1963, he directed one of the first Dominican feature films, La silla (The Chair).

He became a member of the Dominican Academy of Language on January 24, 2008 and was a member of the Academy's board of directors. On April 30, 2008, in Madrid, the Royal Spanish Academy issued him a document in which he records the decision taken by its board on April 3, 2008 to appoint him Corresponding Academician for the Dominican Republic.

Domínguez was hospitalized on August 18, 2025, and died on August 26, at the age of 94.
