= Raquel Peña (politician) =

Dominican politician and academic (born 1966)

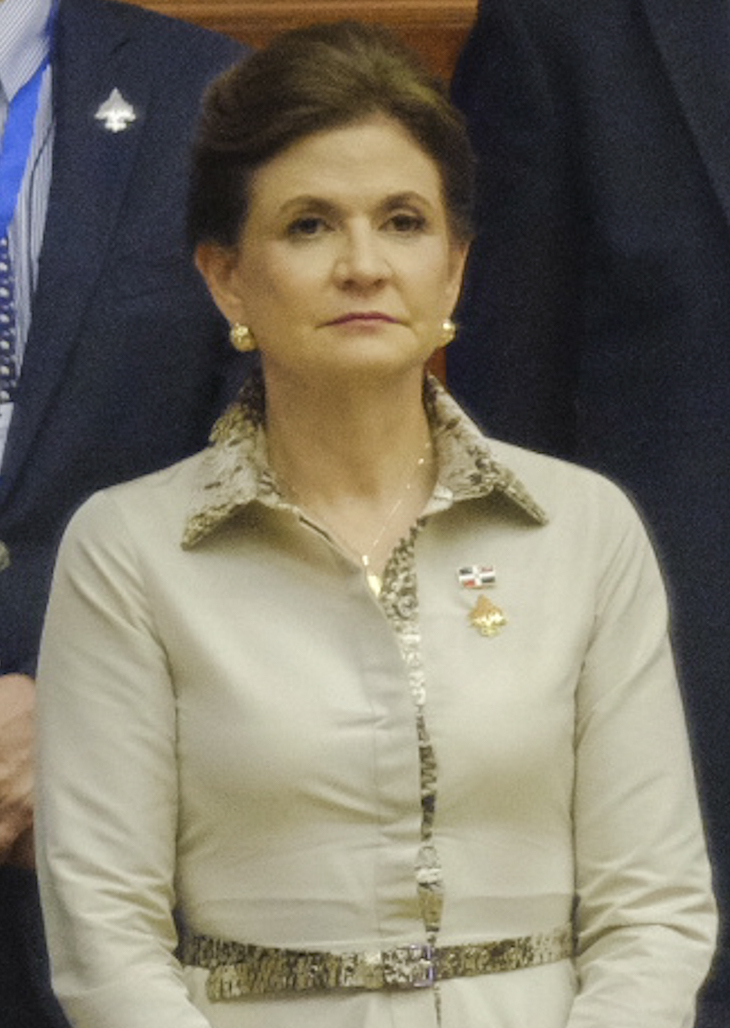
- Peña in 2025

40th Vice President of the Dominican Republic
- Incumbent
- Assumed office 16 August 2020
- President: Luis Abinader
- Preceded by: Margarita Cedeño

Minister of the Environment and Natural Resources
- Acting; 16 June 2022 – 7 July 2022
- President: Luis Abinader
- Preceded by: Orlando Jorge Mera
- Succeeded by: Miguel Ceara Hatton

Personal details
- Born: Raquel Peña Rodríguez; 10 September 1966 (age 60) Santiago de los Caballeros, Dominican Republic
- Party: Modern Revolutionary Party
- Spouse: Marco José Antuña Cabral (d. 2019)
- Children: 3
- Education: Pontificia Universidad Católica Madre y Maestra (Lic.); Université du Québec à Montréal (MBA)
- Occupation: Politician
- Profession: Business administrator; academician
- Website: Vice President's website (in Spanish)

Raquel Peña Rodríguez de Antuña (born 10 September 1966) is a Dominican politician and academic who has served as the 40th Vice President of the Dominican Republic under President Luis Abinader since 2020. From 16 June to 7 July 2022, she was acting Minister of the Environment and Natural Resources.

== Early life and education ==
Raquel Peña was born in Santiago de los Caballeros, Dominican Republic, on 10 September 1966, to Rafael Leocadio Peña Guillén and Estela Rodríguez de Peña. Her father was a cigar salesman. Her primary education was conducted in Santiago de los Caballeros at the Sagrado Corazón de Jesús and La Salle schools. She graduated from Pontificia Universidad Católica Madre y Maestra (PUCMM) with a degree in business administration and from the Université du Québec with a Master of Business Administration in 2002.

== Career ==
Peña assumed control of the general management of the commercial and tobacco companies owned by her family. She holds shares in Parque Industrial Corporación Zona Franca del Norte, SA. She started teaching at PUCMM in 2000, and was director of the Business Administration. She was financial vice-rector of PUCMM from 2015 to 2020.

Peña's family had close ties to political figures in the Dominican Republic, including Hipólito Mejía and Luis Abinader. During the 2012 election Peña led the Modern Revolutionary Party's (PRM) campaign in Santiago de los Caballeros.

Abinader, the presidential nominee of the PRM, selected Peña as his vice presidential running mate and they won in the 2020 election. She is the third woman, after Milagros Ortiz Bosch and Margarita Cedeño, to serve as vice president.

Abinader appointed her as coordinator of the Health cabinet. In that position she managed the Dominican Republic's response to the COVID-19 pandemic. She was temporarily placed as head of the Ministry of Environment in 2022, until someone could be selected to lead it.

== Personal life ==
Peña married Marco José Antuña Cabral, with whom she had three children before his death in 2019.

== Political positions ==
Peña supports having the judiciary branch be independent of the executive branch.

== Works cited ==
=== News ===
- "Conversación íntima con Raquel Peña, la vice de Luis Abinader". Hoy. 1 June 2020. Archived from the original on 25 June 2025.
- "Raquel Peña de Antuña, academic and member of several business bodies". Acento. 10 March 2020. Archived from the original on 30 May 2025.
- "Raquel Peña, from the education sector to the vice-presidency of the Republic in less than a year". Dominican Today. 16 August 2020. Archived from the original on 25 June 2025.
- Mena, Francisco (16 August 2020). "Raquel Peña es la nueva vicepresidenta de RD; hoy se convierten en realidad otros sueños y fantasías". Proceso. Archived from the original on 25 June 2025.

=== Web ===
- "Raquel Peña". World Economic Forum. Archived from the original on 25 June 2025.

Political offices
| Preceded by Margarita Cedeño de Fernández | Vice President of the Dominican Republic; 2020–present | Incumbent |
